= Flag Officer Submarines (India) =

Senior Officer of the Indian Navy

- Flag of the FOSM (Rear Admiral's flag)
- Incumbent; Rear Admiral Sameer Sanjay Pote since 1 May 2026
- Indian Navy
- Abbreviation: FOSM
- Reports to: Flag Officer Commanding-in-Chief Eastern Naval Command
- Seat: Visakhapatnam
- Formation: 1987
- First holder: Rear Admiral Arun Auditto, AVSM, NM

The Flag Officer Submarines (FOSM) is the single-point class authority of submarines in the Indian Navy. A two star officer holding the rank of Rear Admiral, the FOSM is responsible for submarine safety, submarine training, maintenance and operating schedules and operational readiness inspections. The current FOSM is Rear Admiral Sameer Sanjay Pote who assumed office on 1 May 2026.

== History ==
The submarine arm of the Indian Navy was formed with the commissioning of INS Kalvari (S23) in December 1967. Three other submarines – Khanderi, Karanj and Kursura were acquired from the Soviet Union and the 8th Submarine squadron was formed. The submarine base INS Virbahu in Visakhapatnam was commissioned on 19 May 1971 as the shore support base for submarines. The Commanding Officer of Virbahu functioned as the Captain of the submarine squadron and the class Authority for all submarines.

In 1985, the Navy's Command and Control structure was streamlined. To rationalise Command and Control of the Submarine Arm, a single-point class authority was constituted which would be located at the Submarine Headquarters in Visakhapatnam. This authority would be responsible for all training and maintenance of submarines, analogous to Flag Officer Naval Aviation (FONA). The authority was christened Flag Officer Submarines (FOSM) and Rear Admiral Arun Auditto, AVSM, NM took over as the first FOSM. The FOSM was to be responsible to NHQ for all Class Authority and training functions in regard to submarines. The FOSM would be under the administrative control of the Flag Officer Commanding-in-Chief Eastern Naval Command. (FOC-in-C ENC), but interact with the FOC-in-C of both Eastern Naval Command and Western Naval Command on all matters related to his charter of duties.

In the 1990s, the need for a senior officer at Naval headquarters was felt. The officer would impart senior level advice on submarine matters. On 14 October 1996, the appointment of Assistant Chief of Naval Staff (Submarines) (ACNS SM) was created. Rear Admiral Arun Kumar Singh, AVSM, NM took over as the first ACNS (SM). He also dual-hatted as the FOSM. While the policy decisions were taken by the FOSM, the administration of the submarine HQ was carried out by a Commodore. The ACNS functioned under the Deputy Chief of the Naval Staff. In January 2001, the post of ACNS (SM) was instituted as a separate billet. The ACNS (SM) is based at NHQ while the FOSM is based at Visakhapatnam.

== Structure ==
The submarine base INS Virbahu and the submarine training school INS Satavahana come under the FOSM. INS Satavahana, being a training establishment comes under the Flag Officer Commanding-in-Chief Southern Naval Command since the command is the training command of the Navy. FOSM provides necessary support to FOC-in-C South for technical aspects of submarine training.

== List of FOSM ==
S.No.	Name	Assumed office	Left office	Notes
1	Rear Admiral Arun Auditto AVSM, NM	1 May 1987	31 July 1988	First FOSM.
2	Rear Admiral J. M. S. Sodhi VSM	1 August 1988 (Note: Appointed as a Commodore, promoted to the rank of rear-admiral on 22 August 1988.)	24 March 1991	Later served as Fortress Commander, Andaman and Nicobar Islands.
3	Rear Admiral R. N. Ganesh AVSM, NM	25 March 1991	11 October 1992	Later served as Flag Officer Commanding Western Fleet, Fortress Commander, Andaman and Nicobar Islands, Director General of the Indian Coast Guard and Flag Officer Commanding-in-Chief Southern Naval Command.
4	Rear Admiral S. C. Anand AVSM	12 October 1992	31 October 1996	
5	Rear Admiral Arun Kumar Singh AVSM, NM	1 November 1996	9 March 2000	Later served as Director General of the Indian Coast Guard, Commander-in-Chief, Andaman and Nicobar Command and Flag Officer Commanding-in-Chief Eastern Naval Command.
6	Rear Admiral R. K. Sharma AVSM, VSM	10 March 2000	5 November 2001	
7	Rear Admiral Arun Kumar Singh AVSM, NM	6 November 2001	24 June 2002	Second tenure.
8	Rear Admiral K. N. Sushil NM	25 June 2002	15 August 2005	Later served as Flag Officer Commanding-in-Chief Southern Naval Command.
9	Rear Admiral A. Y. Kalaskar NM, VSM	16 August 2005	31 August 2006	Later served as FOMA.
10	Rear Admiral Pradeep Kumar Chatterjee NM	1 September 2006	25 November 2008	Later served as Deputy Chief of the Naval Staff and Commander-in-Chief, Andaman and Nicobar Command.
11	Rear Admiral M. T. Moraes AVSM	26 November 2008	28 July 2011	Later Inspector General Nuclear Safety.
12	Rear Admiral Srikant	29 July 2011	21 September 2012	Later served as Commandant of the National Defence College and Director General Project Seabird.
13	Rear Admiral S. V. Bhokare YSM, NM	22 September 2012	24 September 2015	Later Inspector General Nuclear Safety.
14	Rear Admiral Sanjay Mahindru NM	25 September 2015	10 October 2016	Later Deputy Chief of the Naval Staff
15	Rear Admiral Vennam Srinivas NM	11 October 2016 (Note: Appointed as a Commodore, promoted to the rank of rear-admiral on 24 October 2016.)	5 February 2020	Current Flag Officer Commanding-in-Chief Southern Naval Command.
16	Rear Admiral A. Y. Sardesai	5 February 2020 (Note: Appointed as a Commodore, promoted to the rank of rear-admiral on 1 July 2020.)	31 March 2023	Current Inspector General Nuclear Safety
17	Rear Admiral K. Venkatraman VSM	1 April 2023	1 Sept 2024	
18	Rear Admiral Chetan C Chandegave	1 Sept 2024	30 April 2026	
19	Rear Admiral Sameer Sanjay Pote YSM	1 May 2026	Present	Current FOSM

== See also ==
- Commodore Commanding Submarines (East)
- Commodore Commanding Submarines (West)

== Bibliography ==
- Singh, Satyindra (1991), Blueprint to bluewater: The Indian Navy, 1951-65, Lancer International, ISBN 978-8170621485
- Hiranandani, G M (2005), Transition to eminence : the Indian navy 1976-1990, Lancer Publishers, ISBN 978-8170622666
- Hiranandani, G. M. (2010), Transition to Guardianship: The Indian Navy 1991-2000, Lancer InterConsult, Incorporated, ISBN 978-1935501268
- Singh, Anup (2018), Blue Waters Ahoy!: The Indian Navy 2001-2010, HarperCollins Publishers India, ISBN 978-9353025526
