= Deputy Chief of the Naval Staff (India) =

Senior Appointment in the Indian Navy

- Flag of the Vice Admiral

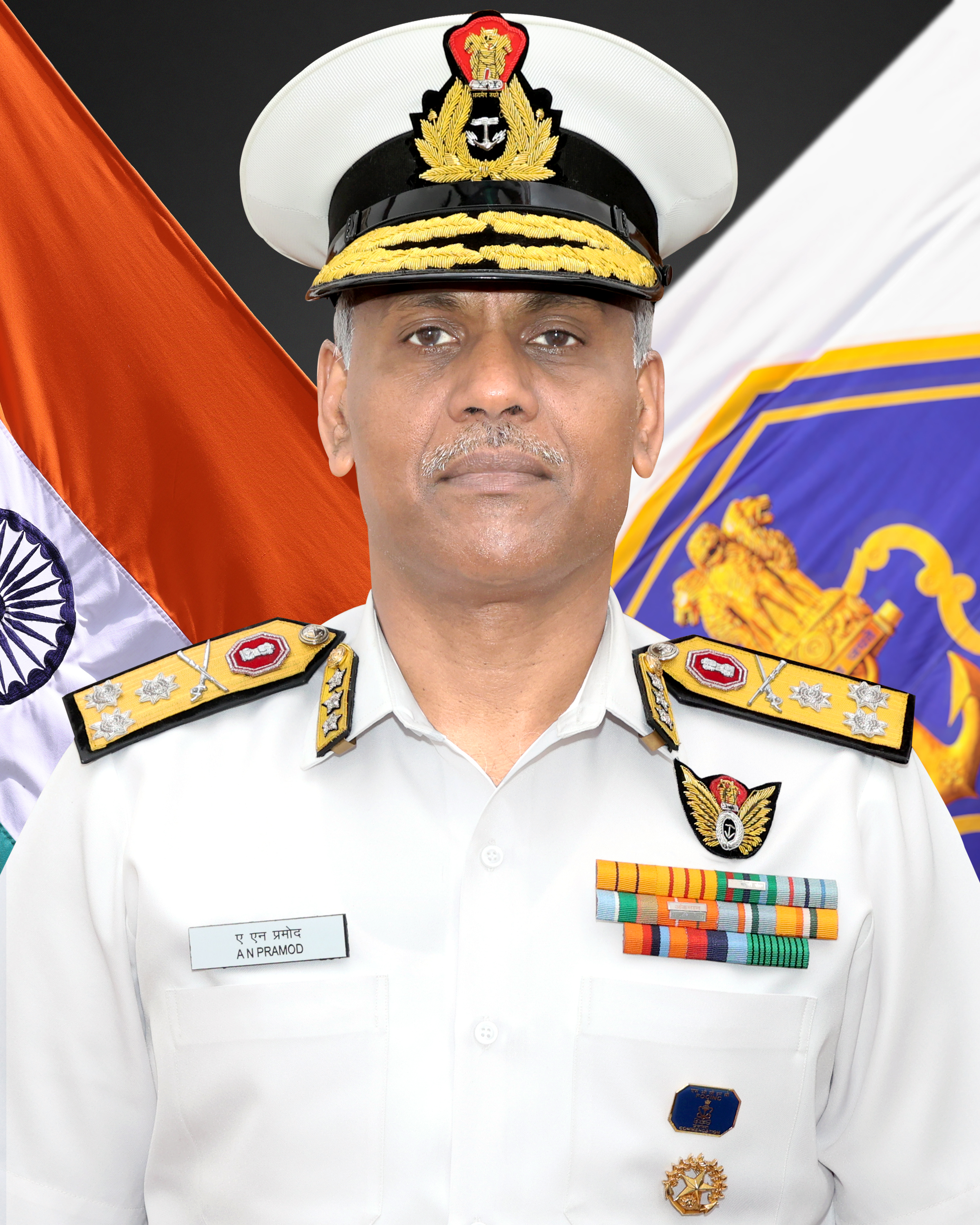
- Incumbent; Vice Admiral A. N. Pramod; AVSM YSM since 1 August 2026
- Indian Navy
- Type: Principal Staff Officer
- Abbreviation: DCNS
- Reports to: Chief of the Naval Staff
- Residence: Bungalow 27, Tughlak Road, New Delhi
- Seat: Naval Headquarters, New Delhi

The Deputy Chief of the Naval Staff (DCNS) is a senior appointment in the Indian Navy. DCNS is a PSO (Principal Staff Officer) appointment at the Naval Headquarters in New Delhi. The office is held by a Three star officer in the rank of Vice Admiral. The current DCNS is Vice Admiral A. N. Pramod who assumed the office on 1 August 2026.

== History ==
At the time of independence of India on 15 August 1947, the Chief of Staff to the Commander-in-Chief, Royal Indian Navy was the de facto Second-in-command. The appointment was held by an officer of the rank of Commodore. In 1949, the Chief of Staff was also made Deputy Commander-in-Chief RIN. In 1955, the post was re-designated Deputy Chief of the Naval Staff. In 1959, the post was upgraded to Two-star rank. In 1967, this post was re-designated to Vice Chief of the Naval Staff and then Rear Admiral Sourendra Nath Kohli took over as the first VCNS.

== From 1972 ==
The appointment was brought back in 1972 in the rank of Rear Admiral. The appointment of Assistant Chief of the Naval Staff (ACNS) was redesignated DCNS. The DCNS had the directorates of Operations, Intelligence, Signals, Air Staff, Air Materiel and Submarines under him. In 1984, the post was upgraded to three-star rank.

== Current organisation ==
The DCNS heads the Staff Branch-II at the Naval Headquarters. The following Director General/Assistant Principal Staff Officers report into the DCNS.

- Director General Naval Operations (DGNO)
  - Assistant Chief of Naval Staff (Communication, Space and Network Centric Operations) (reports through the DGNO)
- Assistant Chief of Naval Staff (Foreign Co-operation & Intelligence)
- Assistant Chief of Naval Staff (Air)
- Assistant Chief of Naval Staff (Air Materiel)

== Order of precedence ==
The DCNS ranks at No. 24 on the Indian order of precedence, along with Lieutenant Generals of the Indian Army and Air Marshals of the Indian Air Force. The DCNS is in the HAG+ pay scale (pay level 16), and draws salary depending on the years in service. However, since they should not draw equivalent or more than the next higher level, the remuneration is capped at ₹224,000.

== Deputy Chiefs of Naval Staff ==
=== 1947-1967 ===
S.No.	Name	Assumed office	Left office	Notes
Chief of Staff to Commander-in-Chief, Royal Indian Navy
1	Commodore M. H. St. L. Nott DSO, OBE	August 1947	March 1948	Seconded from the Royal Navy. Killed in an air crash.
	Commodore Ajitendu Chakraverti	March 1948	November 1948	Officiating. First Indian officer to be promoted to Commodore. Later Flag Officer Commanding Indian Fleet.
2	Commodore Harold Drew CBE, DSC	6 December 1948	February 1949	Seconded from the Royal Navy.
Deputy Commander-in-Chief
2	Commodore Harold Drew CBE, DSC	February 1949	18 February 1952	Seconded from the Royal Navy.
3	Commodore Godfrey French	18 February 1952	16 March 1954	Seconded from the Royal Navy.
4	Commodore Ram Dass Katari	16 March 1954	March 1955	Later took over as the first Indian Chief of the Naval Staff.
Deputy Chief of the Naval Staff
4	Commodore Ram Dass Katari	April 1955	March 1956	Later took over as the first Indian Chief of the Naval Staff.
5	Commodore Ajitendu Chakraverti	March 1956	April 1958	First Indian officer to be promoted to Commodore. Later Flag Officer Commanding Indian Fleet.
6	Rear Admiral Adhar Kumar Chatterji	April 1958 (Note: Post upgraded to Rear Admiral 5 March 1959.)	May 1962	Later Chief of the Naval Staff.
7	Rear Admiral Sardarilal Mathradas Nanda AVSM	May 1962	December 1964	Later Chief of the Naval Staff.
8	Rear Admiral Sourendra Nath Kohli	December 1964	May 1967	Later Chief of the Naval Staff.

=== 1973-present ===
S.No.	Name	Assumed office	Left office	Notes
1	Rear Admiral Swaraj Parkash MVC, AVSM (first tenure)	March 1973	November 1973	Later Director General of the Indian Coast Guard.
2	Rear Admiral N. P. Datta AVSM (first tenure)	November 1973	April 1974	
3	Rear Admiral Swaraj Parkash MVC, AVSM (second tenure)	April 1974	March 1976	
4	Vice Admiral N. P. Datta AVSM (second tenure)	March 1976	November 1977	
5	Rear Admiral M. R. Schunker AVSM	November 1977	February 1978	
6	Rear Admiral D. S. Paintal AVSM	February 1978	October 1980	
7	Rear Admiral Radhakrishna Hariram Tahiliani AVSM	4 October 1980	20 February 1982	Later Chief of the Naval Staff.
8	Vice Admiral Subimal Mookerjee AVSM	20 February 1982	27 June 1983	
9	Vice Admiral Gulab Mohanlal Hiranandani AVSM, NM	27 June 1983	28 November 1984	
10	Vice Admiral S. Jain PVSM, AVSM	2 February 1985	20 February 1986	
11	Vice Admiral Laxminarayan Ramdas AVSM, VrC, VSM	20 February 1986	28 November 1987	Later Chief of the Naval Staff.
12	Vice Admiral R. P. Sawhney	28 November 1987	25 February 1989	Later Fortress Commander, Andaman and Nicobar Islands and Flag Officer Commanding-in-Chief Southern Naval Command.
13	Vice Admiral KASZ Raju AVSM, NM	10 March 1989	28 December 1990	Later Flag Officer Commanding-in-Chief Southern Naval Command and Flag Officer Commanding-in-Chief Western Naval Command.
14	Vice Admiral B. Guha	28 December 1990	10 November 1992	
15	Vice Admiral Vishnu Bhagwat AVSM	10 November 1992	31 December 1994	Later Chief of the Naval Staff.
16	Vice Admiral Avnish Rai Tandon AVSM	1 January 1995	24 April 1996	
17	Vice Admiral Madhvendra Singh AVSM	24 April 1996	30 October 1996	Later Chief of the Naval Staff.
18	Vice Admiral Vinod Pasricha	30 October 1996	28 February 1998	
19	Vice Admiral Madanjit Singh	March 1998	March 1999	
20	Vice Admiral Harinder Singh	March 1999	November 2000	
21	Vice Admiral Raman Puri	24 November 2000	January 2002	
22	Vice Admiral S. V. Gopalachari	January 2002	August 2004	
23	Vice Admiral Sureesh Mehta AVSM	August 2004	27 September 2005	Later Chief of the Naval Staff.
24	Vice Admiral Jagjit Singh Bedi UYSM, AVSM, VSM	27 September 2005	24 July 2006	Later Flag Officer Commanding-in-Chief Southern Naval Command and Flag Officer Commanding-in-Chief Western Naval Command.
25	Vice Admiral Raman P. Suthan AVSM, VSM	24 July 2006	26 April 2007	
26	Vice Admiral Anup Singh	26 April 2007	30 November 2009	Later Flag Officer Commanding-in-Chief Eastern Naval Command
27	Vice Admiral Robin K. Dhowan AVSM, YSM	30 November 2009	16 September 2011	Later Chief of the Naval Staff.
28	Vice Admiral Satish Soni AVSM, NM	16 September 2011	29 May 2012	Later Flag Officer Commanding-in-Chief Southern Naval Command and Flag Officer Commanding-in-Chief Eastern Naval Command.
29	Vice Admiral Pradeep Kumar Chatterjee AVSM, NM	29 May 2012	31 May 2014	Later Commander-in-Chief, Andaman and Nicobar Command.
30	Vice Admiral Rama Kant Pattanaik AVSM, YSM	31 May 2014	31 October 2015	
31	Vice Admiral Karambir Singh AVSM	31 October 2015	6 June 2016	Later Chief of the Naval Staff.
32	Vice Admiral G. Ashok Kumar AVSM, VSM	6 June 2016	30 January 2019	Later Vice Chief of the Naval Staff.
33	Vice Admiral Murlidhar Sadashiv Pawar AVSM, VSM	3 January 2019	31 May 2021	
34	Vice Admiral Ravneet Singh AVSM, NM	1 June 2021	31 March 2022	
35	Vice Admiral Sanjay Mahindru AVSM, NM	1 April 2022	30 September 2023	
36	Vice Admiral Tarun Sobti UYSM, AVSM, VSM	1 October 2023	31 July 2026	
37	Vice Admiral A. N. Pramod AVSM, YSM	1 August 2026	Present	

== See also ==
- Chief of the Naval Staff
- Vice Chief of the Naval Staff
- Deputy Chief of the Army Staff
- Deputy Chief of the Air Staff
