= Vennam Srinivas =

Indian Navy admiral

Vice Admiral Vennam Srinivas PVSM, AVSM, NM
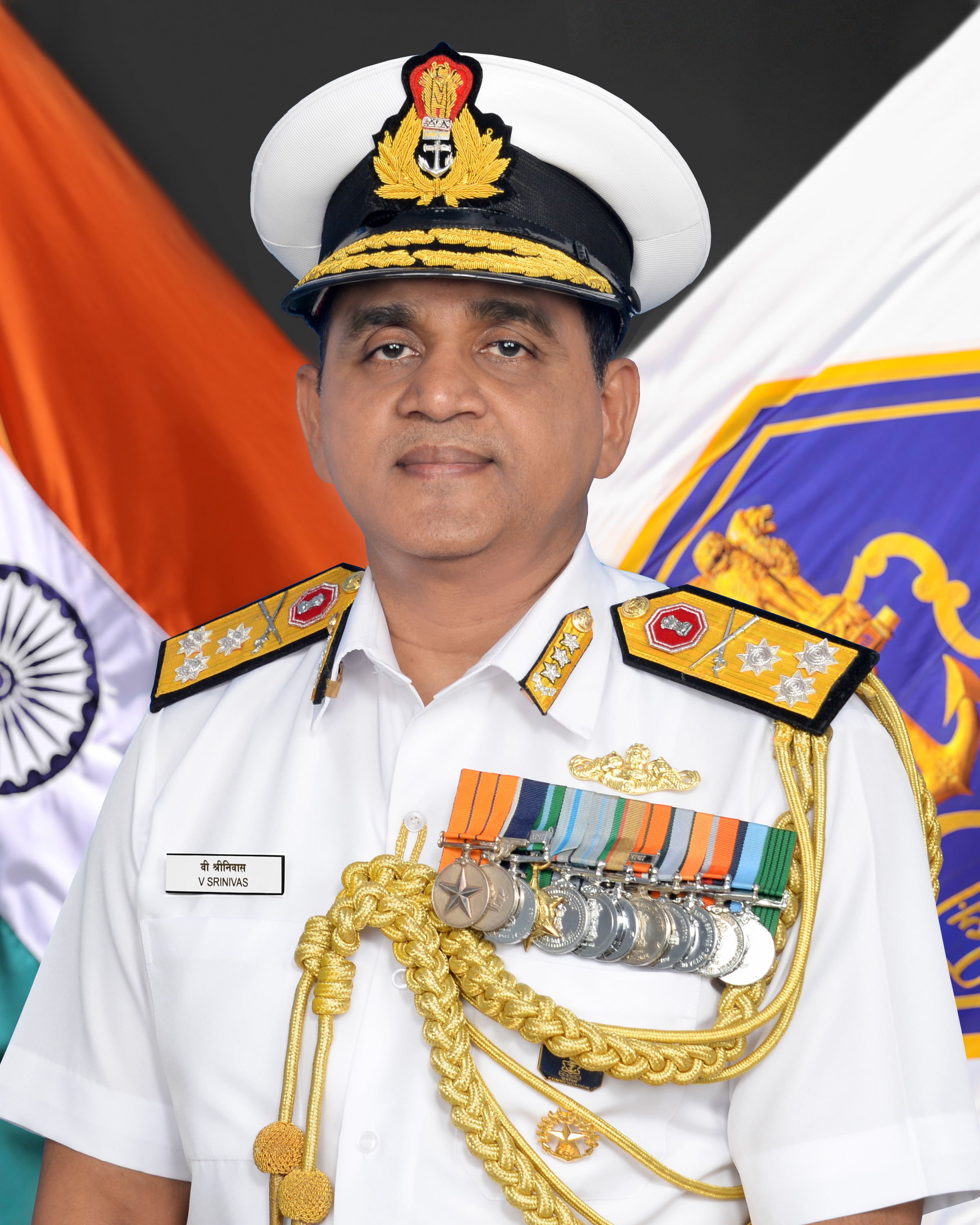

Flag Officer Commanding-in-Chief Southern Naval Command
- In office 1 January 2024 – 31 October 2025
- Preceded by: M. A. Hampiholi
- Succeeded by: Sameer Saxena

Personal details
- Education: Indian Naval Academy

Military service
- Allegiance: India
- Branch/service: Indian Navy
- Years of service: 01 July 1987 – 31 October 2025
- Rank: Vice Admiral
- Commands: Southern Naval Command; Maharashtra Naval Area; Flag Officer Submarines; INS Chakra; INS Satavahana; INS Ranvir (D54); INS Shankul (S47)
- Awards: Ati Vishisht Seva Medal; Nao Sena Medal

Vice Admiral Vennam Srinivas, PVSM, AVSM, NM is a former flag officer in the Indian Navy. He last served as the Flag Officer Commanding-in-Chief Southern Naval Command. He previously served as the Inspector General Nuclear Safety, Flag Officer Commanding Maharashtra Naval Area (FOMA) and as the Flag Officer Submarines (FOSM).

== Naval career ==
Srinivas was commissioned into the Indian Navy on 1 July 1987. He specialized in anti-submarine warfare and joined the submarine arm where he has served for over 30 years. He served onboard the Shishumar-class submarines INS Shalki (S46), INS Shishumar (S44), and INS Shankul (S47) during Operation Vijay. In his staff appointments, he served as Commander (Submarines) at Commodore Commanding Submarines (West) at Mumbai and as the Chief Staff Officer to Flag Officer Submarines.

He attended the Defence Services Staff College, Wellington and the Naval War College, Goa where he was awarded the Commander-in-Chief's Silver Medal. He also attended the Senior Defence Management Course at the College of Defence Management, Secunderabad.

He has commanded two conventional submarines including the Shishumar-class diesel-electric attack submarine INS Shankul (S47) and the Rajput-class Guided-missile destroyer INS Ranvir (D54). He then commanded the nuclear-powered attack submarine Chakra.

As a Commodore, Srinivas served as Principal Director Ship Systems and Development (PDSSD) at naval headquarters. He then commanded the Navy’s submarine training establishment INS Satavahana at Visakhapatnam.

=== Flag rank ===
On 24 October 2016, Srinivas was appointed Flag Officer Submarines (FOSM), taking over from Rear Admiral Sanjay Mahindru. He had a long tenure as FOSM, till February 2020. On 8 February, he was appointed Flag Officer Commanding Maharashtra Naval Area and took over from Rear Admiral Rajesh Pendharkar. After a year-long tenure, he moved to NHQ to head the Advanced Technology Vessel (ATV) project. He subsequently was promoted to the rank of Vice Admiral and was appointed Inspector General Nuclear Safety.

He was appointed as the Flag Officer Commanding-in-Chief, Southern Naval Command on 5 December 2023, and assumed the office on 31 December 2023 succeeding Vice Admiral M. A. Hampiholi.

== Awards and decorations ==
Srinivas was awarded the Nao Sena Medal in 2009, the Ati Vishisht Seva Medal in 2021 and the Param Vishisht Seva Medal in 2025.

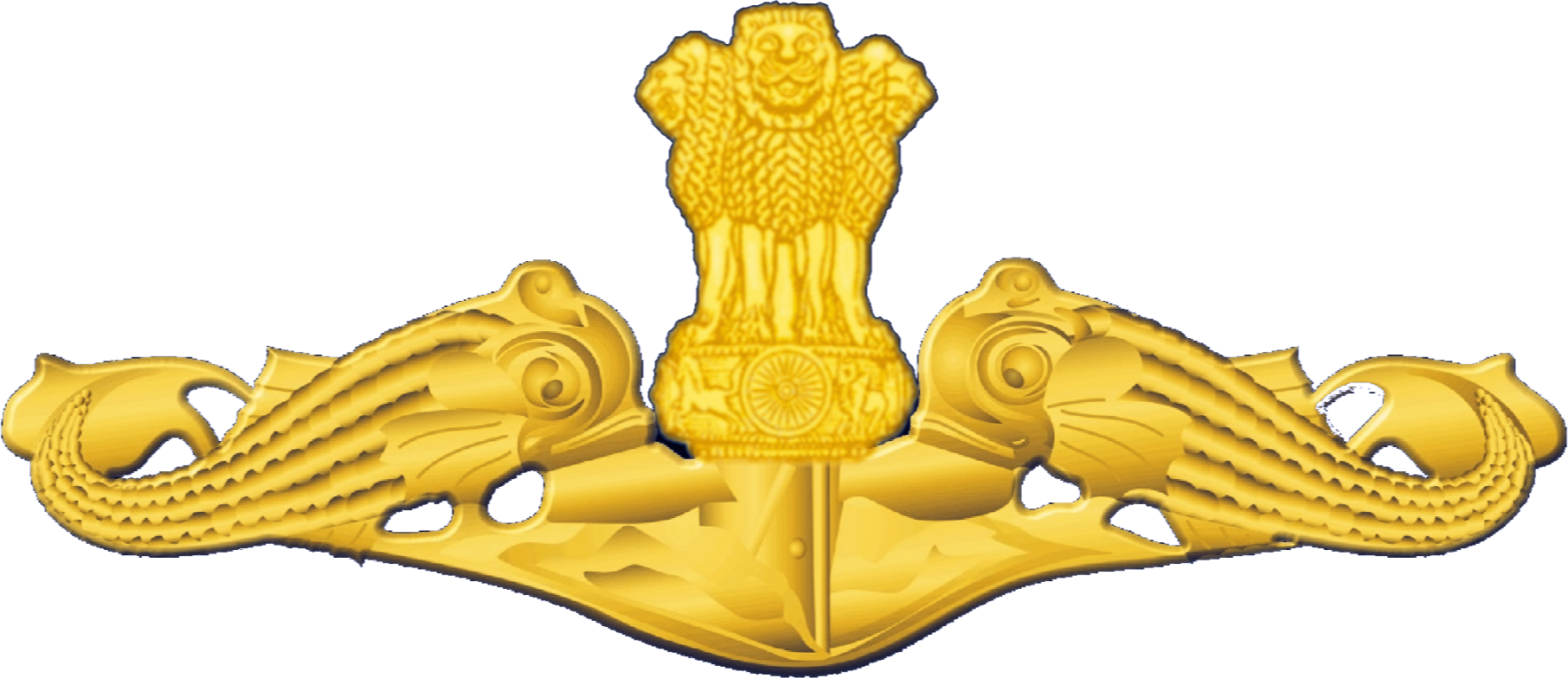

Submariner's (Dolphin) Badge
Param Vishisht Seva Medal	Ati Vishisht Seva Medal	Nau Sena Medal	Samanya Seva Medal
Operation Vijay Star	Operation Vijay Medal	Operation Parakram Medal	Sainya Seva Medal
75th Independence Anniversary Medal	50th Independence Anniversary Medal		30 Years Long Service Medal
20 Years Long Service Medal		9 Years Long Service Medal	

== See also ==
- Flag Officer Submarines

Military offices
Preceded by Sanjay Mahindru	Flag Officer Submarines; 2016 - 2020	Succeeded by A. Y. Sardesai
Preceded by Rajesh Pendharkar	Flag Officer Commanding Maharashtra Naval Area; 2020 – 2021	Succeeded by Atul Anand
Preceded by S. V. Bhokare	Inspector General Nuclear Safety; 2021 – 2023	Succeeded by A. Y. Sardesai
Preceded by M. A. Hampiholi	Flag Officer Commanding-in-Chief Southern Naval Command; 1 January 2024 - 31 October 2025	Succeeded by Sameer Saxena
