= S. V. Bhokare =

Indian Navy officer

Vice Admiral S. V. Bhokare AVSM, YSM, NM
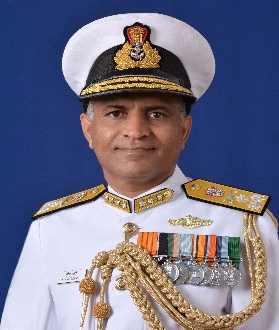
- Military career
- Allegiance: India
- Branch: Indian Navy
- Service years: 1984 - 2021
- Rank: Vice Admiral
- Commands: Indian Naval Academy; Eastern Fleet; INS Sindhughosh; INS Sindhudhvaj; INS Sindhushastra; INS Beas; INS Vajrabahu
- Awards: Ati Vishisht Seva Medal; Yudh Seva Medal; Nao Sena Medal

Vice Admiral Soonil Vasant Bhokare, AVSM, YSM, NM is a former Flag Officer of the Indian Navy. He last served as the Inspector General Nuclear Safety.

== Education ==
Bhokare is an alumnus of Sainik School Satara. He is a Graduate of National Defence Academy, Khadakvasla. He also attended the Defence Services Staff College, Wellington, Tamil Nadu. He graduated from the Higher Command Course at Army War College, Mhow and also holds a master's degree in Defence and Strategic Studies from Australian Defence College, Canberra.

== Navy career ==
Bhokare has commanded the submarines INS Sindhughosh, INS Sindhudhvaj, INS Sindhushastra, as well as the guided missile frigate INS Beas and the submarine base INS Vajrabahu. He was also the Commodore Commanding Submarines (West) and Chief Staff Officer (Operations) at Eastern Naval Command.

=== Flag rank ===
As a Rear Admiral, Bhokare has served as the Flag Officer Submarines (FOSM) and later as Flag Officer Commanding Eastern Fleet (FOCEF). He was also the Commandant of the Indian Naval Academy.

== Awards and decorations ==
Bhokare has been awarded the AVSM, YSM, NM.

Ati Vishisht Seva Medal	Yudh Seva Medal	Nao Sena Medal	Operation Parakram Medal
Videsh Seva Medal	50th Anniversary of Independence Medal		30 Years Long Service Medal
	20 Years Long Service Medal	9 Years Long Service Medal	

Military offices
Preceded by Srikant	Inspector General Nuclear Safety; 2018 – 2021	Succeeded by Vennam Srinivas
Preceded by Ajit Kumar P	Commandant, Indian Naval Academy; October 2017 - February 2018	Succeeded by R. B. Pandit
Preceded by Ajendra Bahadur Singh	Flag Officer Commanding Eastern Fleet; 2015-2016	Succeeded by Biswajit Dasgupta
Preceded by Srikant	Flag Officer Submarines; 2012-2015	Succeeded by Sanjay Mahindru
