= Pradeep Kumar Chatterjee =

Indian navy officer

Vice Admiral Pradeep K. Chatterjee PVSM AVSM NM ADC
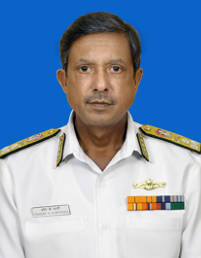
- Military career
- Allegiance: India
- Branch: Indian Navy
- Service years: 1980 - 2016
- Rank: Vice Admiral
- Commands: Commander-in-Chief, Andaman and Nicobar Command; Deputy Chief of Naval Staff; INS Shankush; INS Shankul; INS Krishna; INS Rajput
- Awards: Param Vishisht Seva Medal; Ati Vishisht Seva Medal; Yudh Seva Medal; Nao Sena Medal

Vice Admiral Pradeep Chatterjee, PVSM, AVSM, NM, ADC is a former Flag Officer in the Indian Navy officer. He served as Deputy Chief of Naval Staff of the Indian Navy from 29 May 2012 to 31 May 2014 before serving as Commander-in-Chief, Andaman and Nicobar Command.

== Military career ==
He joined the Indian Navy in July 1977, qualifying as a submariner. He commanded the submarines INS Shankush and INS Shankul.

He later served as Commodore Commanding Submarines (West) in Mumbai, and Principal Director Submarine Operations at Naval Headquarters. On reaching flag rank he served as Flag Officer Submarines, Flag Officer Maharashtra and Gujarat Naval Area and Inspector General Nuclear Safety before his assignment as Deputy Chief of Naval Staff.

He retired in 2016.

The Armed Forces Tribunal imposed a fine of ₹500,000 on him in 2017 for inflating his son-in-law's (Commander AV Agashe) annual confidential reports while spoiling the ones of his fellow officers in the highly specialized field of nuclear reactor operations on submarines.

== Honours and awards ==
He has been awarded the Param Vishisht Seva Medal, Ati Vishisht Seva Medal, Yudh Seva Medal (YSM) and Nao Sena Medal.

Military offices
| Preceded by A. Y. Kalaskar | Flag Officer Submarines; 2006 - 2008 | Succeeded by M. T. Moraes |
| Preceded by M. P. Muralidharan | Flag Officer Commanding Maharashtra & Gujarat Naval Area; 2008 - 2009 | Succeeded by Sunil Lanba |
| Preceded by Satish Soni | Deputy Chief of Naval Staff; 2012 - 2014 | Succeeded by Rama Kant Pattanaik |
| Preceded by Air Marshal PK Roy | Commander-in-Chief, Andaman and Nicobar Command; 2014 - 2016 | Succeeded by Bimal Verma |
