= R. N. Ganesh =

Indian naval officer

Vice Admiral Ravindra Nath Ganesh PVSM, AVSM, NM
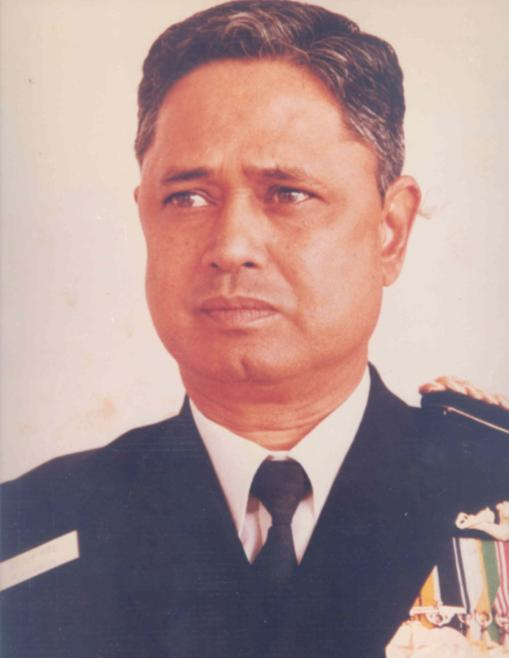
- Ganesh as the DGICG
- Military career
- Allegiance: India
- Branch: Indian Navy; Indian Coast Guard
- Service years: 1963–2001
- Rank: Vice Admiral
- Commands: Southern Naval Command; Indian Coast Guard; Fortress Andaman and Nicobar Islands; Western Fleet; INS Vikrant (R11); INS Chakra; INS Karanj (S21)
- Awards: Param Vishisht Seva Medal; Ati Vishisht Seva Medal; Nao Sena Medal

Vice Admiral Ravindra Nath Ganesh, PVSM, AVSM, NM is a former flag officer of the Indian Navy. He last served as the Flag Officer Commanding-in-Chief Southern Naval Command from 1999 to 2001. He also served as the 10th Director General of the Indian Coast Guard, which he led from 1996 to 1999. He earlier served as the Fortress Commander, Andaman and Nicobar Islands, the precursor of the Andaman and Nicobar Command, and commanded the Western Fleet and the aircraft carrier INS Vikrant (R11). He was the commissioning commanding officer of India's first nuclear submarine, the INS Chakra. He is the only officer of the Indian Navy to have commanded a nuclear submarine and an aircraft carrier.

After a 40-year career in the Navy, he took over as the Director General of the Advanced Technology Vessel Project, the indigenous nuclear submarine project.

== Naval career ==
=== Early career ===
Ganesh was commissioned into the Indian Navy in 1963. In September 1965, India signed an agreement to acquire four submarines and a Submarine tender among other ships. With the formation of the submarine arm shortly after, he volunteered to become a submariner. He was selected and joined the commissioning crew of INS Kalvari (S23), the first submarine to be inducted into the Indian Navy. As part of the commissioning crew, he left for the Soviet Union in early 1966. He was the junior most officer on the Kalvari when she was commissioned.

In the mid-1970s, he was selected to attend the Defence Services Staff College, Wellington. He then commanded the third boat of the Kalvari-class of submarines, INS Karanj (S21). On 26 January 1978, as an acting commander, he was awarded the Nao Sena Medal for gallantry. He subsequently moved to the submarine base INS Virbahu as the Commander (Submarine). In 1982, the Directorate of SSK Project was set up at naval headquarters. The SSK project aimed to construct submarines in India. Ganesh took over as the Joint Director SSK Project at naval headquarters.

=== INS Chakra ===
In 1984, the Advanced Technology Vessel Project (ATVP) was set up with Vice Admiral M. K. Roy as the first Director General. The project was set up to build India's first nuclear submarine. In the first phase of the project, India and the Soviet Union signed an agreement on the transfer of a Charlie-class submarine to the Indian Navy for training purposes. Ganesh was selected to be the commissioning commanding officer of the first nuclear submarine of the Indian Navy. He led the commissioning crew to the Soviet Union where they were trained. After training on Russian language and theory classes, practical training followed on a nuclear submarine. Ganesh commissioned INS Chakra on 5 January 1988 at Vladivostok and sailed for India on 15 January.

Chakra's journey to India was submerged except when transiting through shallow waters in the South China Sea, the Singapore Strait and the Straits of Malacca. The Nilgiri-class frigate INS Dunagiri (F36) met the submarine in the South China Sea and escorted her home. He was awarded the Ati Vishisht Seva Medal on 26 January 1988. Chakra was received at Visakhapatnam on 3 February by the Prime Minister Rajiv Gandhi. Welcoming Ganesh and the crew of Chakra along with the Prime Minister were the Defence Minister K. C. Pant and Flag Officer Commanding-in-Chief Eastern Naval Command Vice Admiral Subash Chopra.

Later that year, Ganesh was one of five naval officers selected to attend the National Defence College (NDC), starting January 1989. He graduated from the 29th course in late 1989 and was appointed commanding officer of the aircraft carrier INS Vikrant (R11). This made the first officer to command a nuclear submarine and an aircraft carrier.

=== Flag rank ===
After a little over a year in command of Vikrant, Ganesh was promoted to the rank of rear admiral in early 1991. On 25 March, he was appointed the third Flag Officer Submarines (FOSM). Created in 1987, FOSM was headquartered in Visakhapatnam and was the class authority, responsible for all training and maintenance of submarines. He spent over one-and-a-half years as FOSM before moving to Eastern Naval Command headquarters as Chief of Staff.

In January 1994, Ganesh was appointed Flag Officer Commanding Western Fleet (FOCWF). He took over from Rear Admiral Madhvendra Singh. In December that year, units of the Western Fleet were grouped into a Task force to be sent to Somalia to de-induct the Indian Army brigade stationed there as part of United Nations Operation in Somalia II. The Task force was led by Ganesh as the FOCWF and the Godavari-class guided missile frigates, INS Godavari (F20) and INS Ganga (F22), and the fleet tanker INS Shakti. The task force left Mumbai on 28 November and arrived off Mogadishu on 6 December, establishing radio contact with the 61st Independent Brigade. The task force went to Kismayo where the troops embarked on the ships ferried by Westland Sea King helicopters. After evacuating troops from Kismayo, the task force returned to Mogadishu and embarked the remaining troops. Codenamed Operation Shield and Operation Bolster, the task force sailed back for Mumbai with all troops in late December.

In April 1995, Ganesh handed over command of the Western Fleet to John Colin De Silva and took over as Chief of Staff, Western Naval Command. After a short tenure as COS, he was promoted to the rank of Vice Admiral and appointed Fortress Commander, Andaman and Nicobar Islands. He took over from Vice Admiral Sushil Kumar on 1 December. The Fortress, A&N Islands was the precursor to the Andaman and Nicobar Command and was the only unified tri-service command in India.

=== DGICG ===
The Indian Coast Guard (ICG) came into being on 19 August 1978. The new service was to function under the overall command and control of a Director General (DGICG). On 18 November 1996, Ganesh took over as the 10th Director General of the Indian Coast Guard (DGICG), succeeding Vice Admiral P. J. Jacob. During his tenure, in January 1999, the Coast Guard was connected by Intranet, christened CGNET.

=== C-in-C ===
After over two years as DGICG, Ganesh was appointed Flag Officer Commanding-in-Chief Southern Naval Command in March 1999. On 26 January 2000, he was awarded the Param Vishisht Seva Medal.

== Post-retirement ==
Ganesh retired after 40 years of service on 31 March 2001. He then took over as the Director General of the Advanced Technology Vessel Project. The appointment was of the rank of Secretary to the Government of India. He had a four-year tenure as DG ATV.

After retiring from the ATV project, Ganesh joined the National Institute of Advanced Studies (NIAS) as Adjunct Professor as well as serving as the Director of Asia Centre Bangalore, a think tank focusing on Politics and Security in the Asia Region.

== Bibliography ==
- Singh, Satyindra (1991), Blueprint to bluewater: The Indian Navy, 1951–65, Lancer International, ISBN 978-8170621485
- Hiranandani, G.M. (1999), Transition to Triumph: History of the Indian Navy, 1965-1975, Spantech & Lancer, ISBN 978-1897829721
- Hiranandani, G M (2005), Transition to eminence : the Indian navy 1976-1990, Lancer Publishers, ISBN 978-8170622666
- Hiranandani, G M (2010), Transition to guardianship : the Indian navy 1991-2000, Lancer Publishers, ISBN 978-1935501268
- Singh, Anup (2018), Blue Waters Ahoy!: The Indian Navy 2001-2010, HarperCollins Publishers India, ISBN 978-9353025526

Military offices
Preceded by J. M. S. Sodhi	Flag Officer Submarines; 1991-1992	Succeeded by S. C. Anand
Preceded by Madhvendra Singh	Flag Officer Commanding Western Fleet; 1994-1995	Succeeded by John Colin De Silva
Preceded by Sushil Kumar	Fortress Commander, Andaman and Nicobar Islands; 1995-1996	Succeeded by Harinder Singh
Preceded by P. J. Jacob	Director General of the Indian Coast Guard; 1996–1999	Succeeded by John Colin De Silva
Preceded by Sushil Kumar	Flag Officer Commanding-in-Chief Southern Naval Command; 1999–2001	Succeeded by Harinder Singh
