= Fortress Commander, Andaman and Nicobar Islands =

Former Indian Navy appointment

Fortress Commander, Andaman and Nicobar Islands (FORTAN)
- Abbreviation: FORTAN
- Reports to: Flag Officer Commanding-in-Chief Eastern Naval Command
- Seat: Port Blair, Andaman and Nicobar Islands
- Precursor: Commodore, Andaman & Nicobar (COMAN)
- Formation: 1977
- First holder: Commodore HML Saxena
- Final holder: Vice Admiral OP Bansal
- Abolished: 2001
- Superseded by: Commander-in-Chief, Andaman and Nicobar Command

The Fortress Commander, Andaman and Nicobar Islands (FORTAN) was a senior appointment of the Indian Navy. As the head of the Fortress, Andaman and Nicobar Islands, FORTAN was based at Port Blair in the Andaman and Nicobar Islands, a Union Territory of India. The Fortress and the appointment were disbanded in 2001 after the Andaman and Nicobar Command was operationalised as the first Integrated Theatre Command of India.

The first FORTAN was Commodore HML Saxena, who took over in 1977 and the last was Vice Admiral OP Bansal who relinquished charge as FORTAN on 27 September 2001.

== History ==
The Andaman and Nicobar Islands became a Union territory of India in 1956. The first military unit on the islands was the naval base INS Jarawa, which was commissioned in 1964. The base was commanded by a Resident Naval Officer (RNO). After establishing subsequent garrisons in the islands, the post was upgraded to Naval Officer-in-Charge Andaman & Nicobar (NOIC A&N). The naval establishments were under the command of the Eastern Naval Command during the Indo-Pakistani War of 1971. In October 1976, the operational control of all forces in the islands was given, and the post was upgraded to Commodore, Andaman & Nicobar (COMAN). In 1977, all establishments came under the newly created Fortress Andaman & Nicobar to signify jointness. The appointment was re-designated to Fortress Commander, Andaman and Nicobar Islands (FORTAN). Commodore HML Saxena, the COMAN, took over as the first FORTAN.

In March 1981, FORTAN was upgraded to a Two star appointment tenanted by a Rear Admiral. In 1987, the post was further upgraded to a three star appointment. In 1998, a 'Far East Naval Command' (FENC) was proposed, to be commanded by a Flag Officer Commanding-in-Chief, Far East Naval Command. However, this proposal was changed in the aftermath of the Kargil War. The Kargil Review Committee recommended the establishment of a tri-service command replacing the FORTAN by a Commander-in-Chief Andaman & Nicobar to control the assets of the three Services and the Indian Coast Guard.

The recommendation was implemented with the Andaman and Nicobar Command being operationalised in October 2001 and Vice Admiral Arun Prakash taking over as the First Commander-in-Chief, Andaman and Nicobar Command (CINCAN).

== List of Commanders ==
The following is a list of Commanders-in-Chief of the A&N command.

S.No.	Name	Assumed office	Left office	Notes
1	Commodore HML Saxena NM	1977	1980	
2	Rear Admiral RP Sawhney AVSM	27 June 1980 (Note: Post upgraded to Rear Admiral in March 1981.)	30 June 1982	Later Commandant of the National Defence Academy and Flag Officer Commanding-in-Chief Southern Naval Command.
3	Rear Admiral Arindam Ghosh VSM	1 July 1982	15 May 1983	
4	Rear Admiral RR Sood VrC, NM	15 May 1983	29 April 1986	
5	Rear Admiral Arun Auditto AVSM, NM	30 April 1986	30 March 1987	First Flag Officer Submarines.
6	Vice Admiral SP Govil AVSM	30 March 1987	1 September 1988	Later Commandant of the National Defence College, Flag Officer Commanding-in-Chief Southern Naval Command and Vice Chief of the Naval Staff.
7	Vice Admiral SW Lakhkar NM, VSM	5 October 1988	28 June 1990	Later Director General of the Indian Coast Guard.
8	Vice Admiral JMS Sodhi VSM	13 July 1990	23 September 1990	
9	Vice Admiral Inderjit Bedi AVSM	24 September 1990	26 August 1991	Later Commandant of the National Defence Academy.
10	Vice Admiral SK Chand AVSM	16 August 1991	29 August 1992	Later Flag Officer Commanding-in-Chief Southern Naval Command and Vice Chief of the Naval Staff.
11	Vice Admiral PS Das UYSM, VSM	29 August 1992	13 May 1994	Later Flag Officer Commanding-in-Chief Eastern Naval Command.
12	Vice Admiral Sushil Kumar UYSM, AVSM, NM	13 May 1994	30 November 1995	Later Chief of the Naval Staff.
13	Vice Admiral R. N. Ganesh AVSM, NM	30 November 1995	11 November 1996	Later Director General Indian Coast Guard and Flag Officer Commanding-in-Chief Southern Naval Command.
14	Vice Admiral Harinder Singh AVSM	12 November 1996	12 March 1999	Later Flag Officer Commanding-in-Chief Southern Naval Command.
15	Vice Admiral Raman Puri AVSM, VSM	13 March 1999	20 November 2000	Later Flag Officer Commanding-in-Chief Southern Naval Command and Chief of Integrated Defence Staff.
16	Vice Admiral OP Bansal AVSM, VSM	21 November 2000	27 September 2001	Later Director General of the Indian Coast Guard, Commander-in-Chief, Andaman and Nicobar Command and Flag Officer Commanding-in-Chief Eastern Naval Command.

== See also ==
- Commander-in-Chief, Andaman and Nicobar Command

== Bibliography ==
- Hiranandani, G M (2005), Transition to eminence : the Indian navy 1976-1990, Lancer Publishers, ISBN 978-8170622666
- Hiranandani, G. M. (2010), Transition to Guardianship: The Indian Navy 1991-2000, Lancer InterConsult, Incorporated, ISBN 978-1935501268
- Singh, Anup (2018), Blue Waters Ahoy!, The Indian Navy 2001-2010, HarperCollins Publishers India, ISBN 978-93-5302-552-6
- Mukherjee, Anit; Mohan, C. Raja (2015), India's Naval Strategy and Asian Security, Routledge, ISBN 978-1-317-36133-6
