= Sanjay Mahindru =

Indian Navy Flag officer

Vice Admiral Sanjay Mahindru PVSM, AVSM, NM
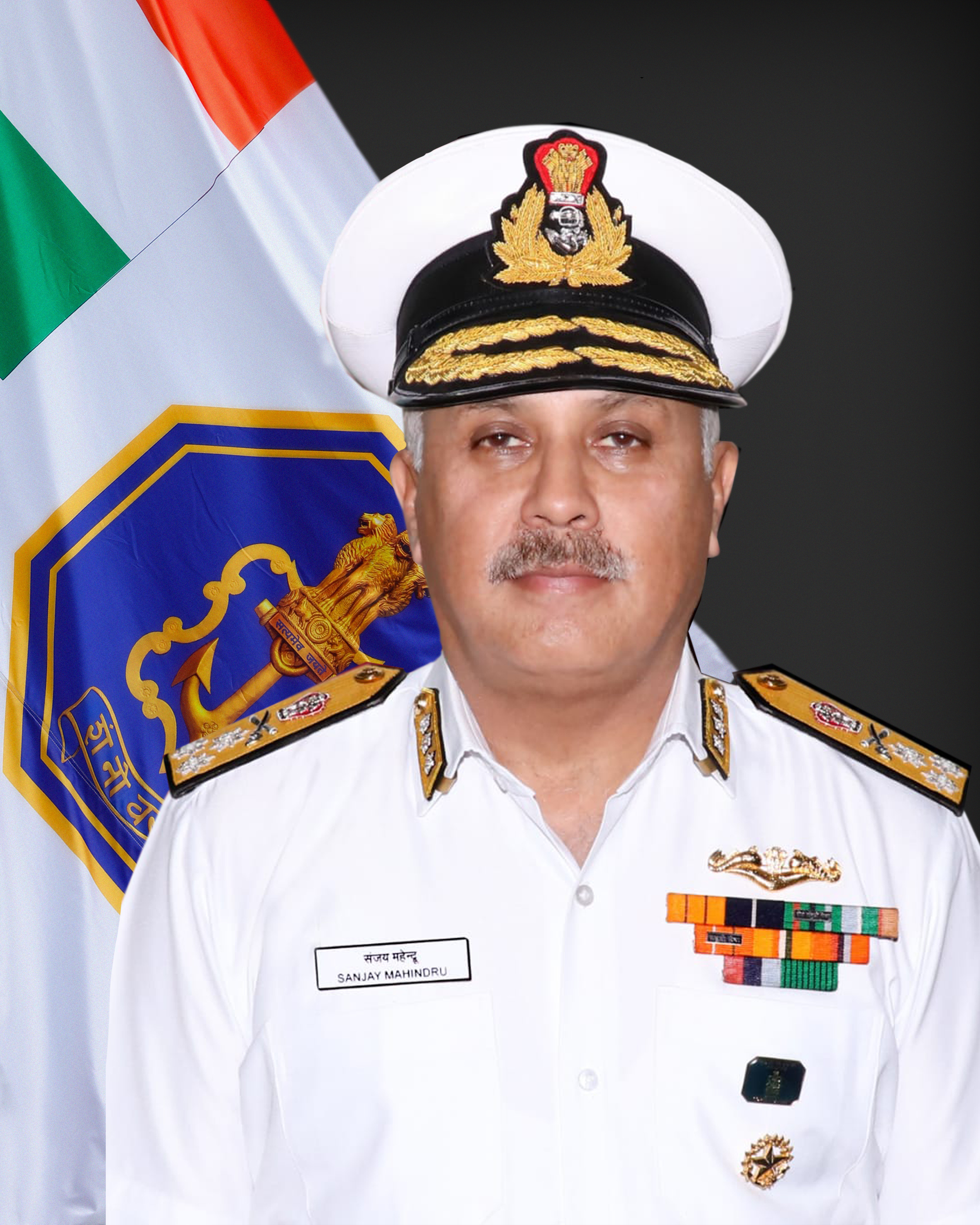
- Mahindru as Deputy Chief of Naval Staff
- Military career
- Allegiance: India
- Branch: Indian Navy
- Service years: 1985 - 2023
- Rank: Vice Admiral
- Commands: Maharashtra Naval Area; Flag Officer Submarines; INS Satavahana; INS Rajput (D51); INS Krishna (F46); INS Shalki (S46)
- Awards: Param Vishisht Seva Medal; Ati Vishisht Seva Medal; Nao Sena Medal

Vice Admiral Sanjay Mahindru, PVSM, AVSM, NM is a former flag officer in the Indian Navy. He last served as the Deputy Chief of the Naval Staff, from 31 Mar 2022 to 30 September 2023. Prior to this, he served as the Flag Officer Commanding Maharashtra Naval Area (FOMA), having been appointed on 17 October 2016. He earlier served as Flag Officer Submarines from 2015 to 2016.

== Career ==
Mahindru joined and graduated from the National Defence Academy. He was commissioned in the Indian Navy on 1 January 1985. He specialised in navigation and qualified as a submariner. He attended the Joint Services Command and Staff College at United Kingdom. He has served in the Directorate of Submarine Operations and Directorate of Nuclear Submarine Acquisition.

He commanded the Shishumar-class submarine INS Shalki (S46), the cadet training ship INS Krishna (F46) and the lead ship of her class of guided-missile destroyers INS Rajput (D51). He also commanded the submarine base INS Satavahana, the Navy’s submarine training establishment where he set up the School for Advanced Underwater Warfare.

Mahindru attended the Higher Naval Command Course at the College of Naval Warfare, Goa . He later served as the Naval Assistant to the Flag Officer Commanding-in-Chief Western Naval Command and to the Flag Officer Commanding-in-Chief Southern Naval Command. As a Commodore, he headed the Arihant Project, India’s first Nuclear Submarine.

=== Flag rank ===
Mahindru was promoted to the rank of Rear Admiral in September 2015 and was appointed Flag Officer Submarines (FOSM), the single-point class authority of submarines in India. After a year-long stint as FOSM, he took over as the Flag Officer Commanding Maharashtra Naval Area (FOMA). As FOMA, he initiated a number of initiatives to improve lives of naval veterans. For his tenure as FOMA, he was awarded the Ati Vishisht Seva Medal on 26 January 2018.

Mahindru subsequently served as the Chief Staff Officer at Headquarters Strategic Forces Command. In 2019, he was promoted to the rank of Vice Admiral and appointed Deputy Commander-in-Chief of the Strategic Forces Command.

On 31 March 2022, he moved to Naval HQ having been appointed Deputy Chief of the Naval Staff (DCNS) succeeding Vice Admiral Ravneet Singh who superannuated. He superannuated on 30 September 2023 and handed over charge of DCNS to Vice Admiral Tarun Sobti.

== Awards and decorations ==
Mahindru was awarded the Nau Sena Medal (Gallantry) in 2002 and the Ati Vishisht Seva Medal in 2018.

Param Vishisht Seva Medal	Ati Vishisht Seva Medal	Nau Sena Medal	Samanya Seva Medal
Operation Parakram Medal	Sainya Seva Medal	75th Independence Anniversary Medal	50th Independence Anniversary Medal
30 Years Long Service Medal	20 Years Long Service Medal		9 Years Long Service Medal

Military offices
Preceded by Ravneet Singh	Deputy Chief of the Naval Staff; 2022 - 2023	Succeeded by Tarun Sobti
Preceded by Satish Namdeo Ghormade	Flag Officer Commanding Maharashtra Naval Area; 2017 - 2018	Succeeded by Puneet Kumar Bahl
Preceded by SV Bhokare	Flag Officer Submarines; 2015-2016	Succeeded by Vennam Srinivas
