= John Colin De Silva =

Indian naval officer

Vice Admiral J. C. De Silva PVSM, AVSM
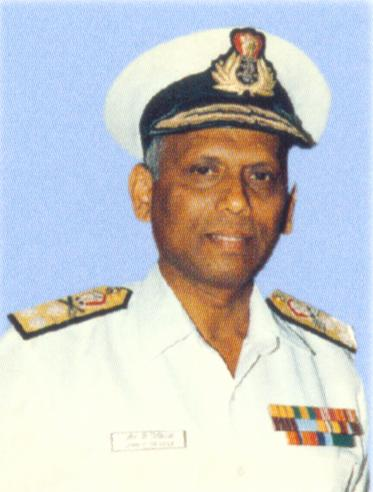
- Born: 18 September 1943
- Died: 20 November 2019 (aged 76); Goa, India
- Burial place: Holy Family Church, Porvorim, Goa, India
- Military career
- Allegiance: India
- Branch: Indian Navy; Indian Coast Guard
- Service years: 1965–2003
- Rank: Vice Admiral
- Nickname: Johnny D
- Commands: Eastern Naval Command; Indian Coast Guard; Western Fleet; INS Ranvijay (D55); INS Vijaydurg (K71); INS Sindhudurg (K72)
- Awards: Param Vishisht Seva Medal; Ati Vishisht Seva Medal

Vice Admiral John Colin De Silva, PVSM, AVSM (18 September 1943 – 20 November 2019) was a flag officer in the Indian Navy. He last served as the Vice Chief of the Naval Staff (VCNS) from 2001 to 2002. He also served as the 11th Director General of the Indian Coast Guard, which he led from 1999 to 2001. He was the commissioning commanding officer of the Rajput-class guided-missile destroyer INS Ranvijay (D55). After retiring from the Navy, he served as Chairman of the Executive Committee of the Overseas Employment Agency, an agency set up by the Government of Goa.

== Early life and education ==
De Silva was born on 18 September 1943. He completed his education in Belgaum, attending the St. Paul's School, Belgaum and R. L. Science Institute. He entered the National Defence Academy in July 1960.

== Naval career ==
=== Early career ===
De Silva was commissioned into the Indian Navy on 1 January 1965. After a few sea tenures, he opted to specialise in gunnery and attended the Long G course. After the completion of the course, he was posted as the Gunnery Officer of the Leopard-class frigate INS Beas (F137). He served on board the ship during the Indo-Pakistani War of 1971. Beas was commanded by Commander Laxminarayan Ramdas and was part of the Eastern Fleet. The ship was part of the force that bombarded Chittagong and participated in the landings at Cox's Bazar. He subsequently served as the gunnery officer of the first Indian built ship - the lead ship of the Nilgiri-class frigate INS Nilgiri (F33). He was then selected to attend the Royal Military College of Science, Shrivenham. He subsequently commanded the Durg-class corvettes INS Vijaydurg (K71) and INS Sindhudurg (K72).

In 1982, the Warship Workup Organisation (WWO) was to be set up in Mumbai. The organisation was aimed at executing the systematic work-up of ships. The organisation and other such workup teams which were set up later in Vizag and Cochin were amalgamated to form the Flag Officer Sea Training in 1992. De Silva was chosen to head the WWO in Mumbai in the rank of Commander. The commissioning crew consisted on 4 other officers and 5 sailors. As the head of the WWO, he was instrumental in creating the first set of tasks and schedules for the work-up of ships. The first ship that the WWO worked on was a Rajput-class destroyer. In 1984, he was selected to attend the Naval War College in Newport, Rhode Island.

In 1987, the fifth and last ship of the Rajput-class destroyers was commissioned as INS Ranvijay (D55). De Silva was appointed the commissioning commanding officer of the ship. Ranvijay was commissioned on 21 December 1987 at Poti in the USSR. He led the ship in the sea trials off Poti and brought her home to India in March 1988. In 1997, the ship was affiliated with the Dogra Regiment of the Indian Army. Subsequently, De Silva served as the Director Naval Intelligence (DNI) at Naval headquarters.

=== Flag rank ===
In 1992, De Silva was promoted to the acting rank of rear admiral and appointed Assistant Chief of Personnel - Human Resource Development (ACOP HRD). This appointment was that of an assistant Principal Staff Officer at Naval HQ. On 26 January 1993, he was awarded the Ati Vishisht Seva Medal. He subsequently took over as the Assistant Chief of Naval Staff - Information Warfare and Operations (ACNS IW&O), also at Naval HQ. In 1995, he was appointed the next Flag Officer Commanding Western Fleet (FOCWF). He took command of the Western Fleet from Rear Admiral R. N. Ganesh on 28 April 1995. After a year-long stint as FOCWF, he relinquished command, handing over to Rear Admiral Madanjit Singh.

In 1997, he was promoted to the rank of Vice Admiral and appointed Controller Warship Production & Acquisition (CWP&A) at Naval HQ. After a short stint, in March 1998, he took over the personnel branch at NHQ as the Chief of Personnel (COP). He served as COP for a year, until March 1999.

=== DGICG ===
The Indian Coast Guard (ICG) came into being on 19 August 1978. The new service was to function under the overall command and control of a Director General (DGICG). On 5 March 1999, De Silva took over as the 11th Director General of the Indian Coast Guard (DGICG), succeeding Vice Admiral R. N. Ganesh. Under him, the coast guard helped capture a pirated Japanese vessel MV Alondra Rainbow in the Arabian Sea. The pirates were captured and convicted in Mumbai. During this tenure, he was awarded the Param Vishisht Seva Medal on 26 January 2001.

=== C-in-C ===
After a two-year stint as DGICG, De Silva was appointed Flag Officer Commanding-in-Chief Eastern Naval Command. He assumed command from Vice Admiral Vinod Pasricha on 31 March 2001. It was to be a short tenure, as on 1 January 2002, he moved to NHQ as the Vice Chief of the Naval Staff succeeding Vice Admiral Madhvendra Singh who took over as the 17th Chief of the Naval Staff.

== Post-retirement ==
De Silva retired after 38 years of service on 30 September 2003. After his retirement, De Silva and his wife Meena settled down in Goa. He resided in the Defence Colony in Porvorim in North Goa. In February 2007, the Government of Goa decided to set up an Overseas Employment Agency to act as a facilitator to scout jobs abroad. De Silva was appointed Chairman of the Executive Committee of the Overseas Employment Agency of Goa on honorary basis. He continued to serve as the Chairman until his demise on 20 November 2019.

De Silva was laid to rest with military honours at the Holy Family Church in Porvorim. Former Chiefs of Naval Staff attended the funeral - Admirals Madhvendra Singh, who delivered the eulogy, Arun Prakash and Sureesh Mehta. Several retired and serving flag officers of the Navy and the Coast Guard were also present to pay their respects.

== Awards and decorations ==

Param Vishisht Seva Medal	Ati Vishisht Seva Medal	Poorvi Star	Paschimi Star
Raksha Medal	Sangram Medal	Videsh Seva Medal	50th Independence Anniversary Medal
25th Independence Anniversary Medal	30 Years Long Service Medal	20 Years Long Service Medal	9 Years Long Service Medal

== Bibliography ==
- Singh, Satyindra (1991), Blueprint to bluewater: The Indian Navy, 1951–65, Lancer International, ISBN 978-8170621485
- Hiranandani, G M (2005), Transition to eminence : the Indian navy 1976-1990, Lancer Publishers, ISBN 978-8170622666
- Hiranandani, G M (2010), Transition to guardianship : the Indian navy 1991-2000, Lancer Publishers, ISBN 978-1935501268
- Prasad, Shankar (2008), The Gallant Dogras: An Illustrated History of the Dogra Regiment, Lancer Publishers, ISBN 978-8170622680

Military offices
Preceded by R. N. Ganesh	Flag Officer Commanding Western Fleet; 1995-1996	Succeeded by Madan Jit Singh
Preceded by P. J. Jacob	Chief of Personnel; 1998–1999	Succeeded by Arun Prakash
Preceded by R. N. Ganesh	Director General of the Indian Coast Guard; 1999–2001	Succeeded by Rameshwar Singh
Preceded by Vinod Pasricha	Flag Officer Commanding-in-Chief Eastern Naval Command; 2001–2002	Succeeded by Raman Puri
Preceded by Madhvendra Singh	Vice Chief of the Naval Staff; 2002–2003	Succeeded by Arun Prakash
