= K96 =

K96 or K-96 may refer to:

- K-96 (Kansas highway), a state highway in Kansas
- HMS Aubrietia (K96), a former UK Royal Navy ship
- INS Chatak (K96), a former Indian Navy ship
