= Inspector General Nuclear Safety =

Senior officer of the Indian Navy

Flag Officer Submarines
- Flag of the IGNS (Vice Admiral's flag)
- Incumbent; Vice Admiral A. Y. Sardesai
- Indian Navy
- Abbreviation: IGNS
- Reports to: Vice Chief of the Naval Staff
- Seat: New Delhi
- Formation: 9 March 2007
- First holder: Vice Admiral K. N. Sushil

The Inspector General Nuclear Safety (IGNS) is a senior appointment in the Indian Navy. A three-star officer holding the rank of vice admiral, the IGNS is responsible for the nuclear and radiation safety of all naval nuclear reactors.

== History ==
With the lead boat of the Arihant-class nuclear-powered ballistic missile submarines, INS Arihant slated to be launched, billet of Inspector General Nuclear Safety was created on 9 March 2007. Vice Admiral K. N. Sushil was the first IGNS. Only submariners have held the appointment.

== Responsibilities ==
Reporting into the Vice Chief of the Naval Staff, the IGNS is responsible for all aspects related to nuclear and radiation safety and inspection of naval nuclear reactors, handling of fissile material and nuclear waste in the Indian Navy. The IGNS is also the competent regulatory authority for naval nuclear plants and infrastructure. Under the Atomic Energy Act, 1962, the IGNS has the powers to lay down safety standards and frame rules and regulations in regard to the regulatory and safety requirement.

== Structure ==
The IGNS is responsible for induction and acquisition of special projects in the Indian Navy and setting up of related shore-based berthing and support infrastructure. He is assisted by the Assistant Chief of Naval Staff (Special Submarine Projects) (ACNS SSP). The Directorates of Nuclear Submarine Acquisition and Nuclear Submarine Project & Infrastructure report into the ACNS (SSP) while the Directorate of Submarine Safety (DSMS) reports directly into the IGNS.

== Appointees ==
Name	Assumed office	Left office	Notes
Vice Admiral K. N. Sushil AVSM NM	March 2007	August 2009	Later Flag Officer Commanding-in-Chief Southern Naval Command.
Vice Admiral Pradeep Kumar Chatterjee AVSM NM	September 2009	May 2012	Later Commander-in-Chief, Andaman and Nicobar Command.
Vice Admiral M. T. Moraes AVSM	May 2012	2015	
Vice Admiral Srikant AVSM	2015	January 2018	Later Commandant of the National Defence College
Vice Admiral S. V. Bhokare AVSM YSM NM	February 2018	June 2021	
Vice Admiral Vennam Srinivas AVSM NM	June 2021	December 2023	Later Flag Officer Commanding-in-Chief Southern Naval Command.
Vice Admiral A. Y. Sardesai AVSM VSM	January 2024	Present	Current IGNS.

== See also ==
- Nuclear Command Authority

== Bibliography ==
- Singh, Anup (2018), Blue Waters Ahoy!: The Indian Navy 2001-2010, HarperCollins Publishers India, ISBN 978-9353025526
