= Arun Auditto =

Flag Officer in the Indian Navy (1934 - 2021)

Rear Admiral Arun Auditto AVSM, NM
- Born: 24 July 1934; Allahabad, United Provinces of British India
- Died: 21 April 2021 (aged 86); Mumbai, India
- Military career
- Allegiance: India
- Branch: Indian Navy
- Service years: 1955–1988
- Rank: Rear Admiral
- Commands: Fortress Andaman and Nicobar; INS Trishul (F143); INS Virbahu; INS Kursura (S20)
- Conflicts: Annexation of Goa; Indo-Pakistani War of 1971
- Awards: Ati Vishisht Seva Medal; Nao Sena Medal

Rear Admiral Arun Auditto, AVSM, NM was a Flag Officer in the Indian Navy. He was decorated with a gallantry award during the Liberation of Goa. A pioneer submariner in the Indian Navy, he was the commissioning commanding officer of the Kalvari-class submarine INS Kursura (S20), which he commanded during the Indo-Pakistani War of 1971. He later commanded the submarine base INS Virbahu and the Whitby-class frigate INS Trishul (F143). After promotion to flag rank, he served as the Fortress Commander, Andaman and Nicobar Islands (FORTAN) and as the first flag officer submarines, before retiring in 1988.

== Early life and education ==
Auditto was born in Allahabad to Gyan Chander, a college lecturer. He completed his schooling in Allahabad, attending the Boys' High School & College. He then attended the Ewing Christian College for a year before getting selected to attend the Joint Services Wing (JSW), Dehradun. While at the JSW, he chose to join the Indian Navy. After graduating from JSW, he trained on board the training ship INS Tir (K256).

== Naval career ==
=== Early career ===
Auditto was commissioned into the Indian Navy in 1955. After training on the Tir, he spent his early years on board the Ton-class minesweeper INS Cannanore and the Hunt-class destroyer INS Godavari (D92). He chose to specialise in Torpedo and anti-submarine warfare (TAS) and was selected to attend the Long course at the TAS school in Cochin. In early November 1961, while he was undergoing the course, he was selected to command a landing party and was posted to the Gunnery school.

=== Operation Vijay 1961 ===
The landing party was platoon-sized and consisted of recently graduated seaman gunners who were being trained in small arms and short gunnery. It also had a demolition section who were trained on underwater weapons. The platoon, led by Auditto, was intensively trained over the month. On 16 December, the platoon embarked on INS Trishul (F143), commanded by Captain K. L. Kulkarni. The landing party was to assault and capture Anjadip Island and Auditto discussed the plan with Captain Kulkarni and the Task Force Commander - the Flag Officer Commanding Indian Fleet Rear Admiral B.S. Soman. On 18 December, the day of the landing, they received intelligence that the Portuguese garrison had surrendered and that no resistance was expected.

The 75 men of the platoon were launched in two boats in broad daylight. The first wave was commanded by Auditto and the next by his second-in-command Senior Commissioned Gunner Noel Kelman. The first boat landed on the beach without resistance but the second boat was met with machine gun fire. The wounded were sent back to Trishul and the platoon captured the Island and took over the prisoners of war. Auditto and Kelman were both wounded in the operation.

Auditto was decorated with the Nao Sena Medal for gallantry. The citation for the Nao Sena Medal reads as follows:

Date of Award: 26 January 1963

CITATION

LIEUTENANT ARUN AUDITTO

(00176-Z)

Called upon to lead a 75-strong landing party on Anjadip Island under heavy enemy fire, Lieutenant Auditto who had no experience in jungle warfare, conducted land-fighting operations with imagination, vigour and determination. His calmness and courage inspired the officers and men under his command to go forward in the face of stiff opposition to final victory.

=== Submarine Arm ===
In 1962, the Government of India approved the proposal of building the submarine arm and the first officers were selected for training. A large number of officers and sailors volunteered to join the submarine arm. In February 1962, Auditto was one of four officers selected to attend HMS Dolphin, the home of the Royal Navy Submarine Service. After completing the year-long course, Auditto returned to India and was appointed TAS officer of the Blackwood-class frigate INS Khukri (F149). He was subsequently posted as an instructor to the TAS school in Cochin.

In September 1965, India signed an agreement to acquire four submarines and a Submarine tender among other ships. INS Kalvari (S23) was the first submarine to be inducted into the Indian Navy in December 1967. Auditto underwent training in Russian language and oversaw training of the crew of the second submarine INS Khanderi. He was appointed the commissioning executive officer of Khanderi, commanded by Commander M. N. Vasudeva. Khanderi sailed from Riga and reached India after rounding the Cape of Good Hope. In December 1969, the fourth submarine was to be commissioned in Riga. Auditto was promoted to the rank of commander and appointed the commissioning commanding officer of INS Kursura (S20). Kursura was commissioned on 18 December 1969 and embarked on her maiden voyage from Balrisk on 20 February 1970. During her homecoming voyage, which lasted from February to April 1970, she visited Gothenburg, La Coruña, Takoradi and Mauritius.

=== Indo-Pakistani War of 1971 ===
The Indo-Pakistani War of 1971 was sparked by the Bangladesh Liberation war, a conflict between the traditionally dominant West Pakistanis and the majority East Pakistanis. In 1970, East Pakistanis demanded autonomy for the state, but the Pakistani government failed to satisfy these demands and, in early 1971, a demand for secession took root in East Pakistan. In March, the Pakistan Armed Forces launched a fierce campaign to curb the secessionists, the latter including soldiers and police from East Pakistan. Thousands of East Pakistanis died, and nearly ten million refugees fled to West Bengal, an adjacent Indian state. In April, India decided to assist in the formation of the new nation of Bangladesh.

Auditto was in command of the submarine during this time. Kursura and INS Karanj (S21) were part of the Western Naval Command. Operating under the direction of the Flag Officer Commanding-in-Chief Western Naval Command Vice Admiral Sourendra Nath Kohli, Kursura was deployed on patrol with the aims:

- To attack and sink all Pakistani warships
- To sink all merchant shipping sighted/detected when specifically ordered
- Patrol and surveillance

Auditto deployed the submarine on 13 November 1971 and was in the designated waiting station till 18 November, moving on to a second waiting station where she remained till 30 November. She then rendezvoused with Karanj on 30th and returned to Mumbai on 4 December.

=== Post-war career ===
After the war, in March 1972, Auditto relinquished command of the submarine. He was appointed commander (executive officer) of the submarine base INS Virbahu in Visakhapatnam. He served as EXO to the first three commanding officers of the base - Captains K. S. Subramaniam, M. N. R. Samant and M. N. Vasudeva. After a long tenure of about four years, he took over as the commanding officer (CO) of the base on 31 January 1976. He served as CO Virbahu for about two years, after which he assumed command of the ship he had been launched from during Operation Vijay - the Whitby-class frigate INS Trishul. Subsequently, he moved to Naval headquarters as the Director Submarine Arm (DSA).

=== Flag rank ===
In June 1983, Auditto was promoted to the rank of rear admiral and appointed assistant chief of naval staff operations (ACNS Ops). He then moved to Visakhapatnam as the chief of staff (COS) to the flag officer commanding-in-chief Eastern Naval Command, Vice Admiral Jayant Ganpat Nadkarni. On 26 January 1986, he was awarded the Ati Vishisht Seva Medal for distinguished service of an exceptional order. After a year-long stint as COS ENC, he took over as the Fortress Commander, Andaman and Nicobar Islands (FORTAN) on 30 April 1986. In 2001, the Andaman and Nicobar Command was created this post was re-designated Commander-in-Chief, Andaman and Nicobar Command.

In 1987, a class authority for submarines was created. The flag officer submarines (FOSM) would be located in Visakhapatnam and be the single-point authority for all training and maintenance of submarines. Auditto was appointed the first FOSM and assumed office on 30 March 1987. As the first FOSM, he was instrumental in setting standards with regard to submarine safety, training, maintenance and operating schedules, operational readiness inspections, etc. After a stint of around sixteen months, Auditto was placed on the retired list and superannuated on 31 July 1988.

== Personal life, later life and death ==
Auditto was married to Ranjana (née Langer), daughter of an Indian Army officer. The couple met while playing badminton at the United Services Club in Colaba, Mumbai. The couple had three children and resided at the Goldcroft Bungalow in Walkeshwar, Malabar Hill in South Mumbai.

After his retirement, Auditto served as the president of the Naval Foundation Mumbai Chapter. On 27 February 2001, INS Kursura was decommissioned at the RK Beachin Visakhapatnam and inaugurated as a museum. As the submarine's first commanding officer, Auditto was the guest of honour during the decommissioning ceremony.

Auditto died peacefully at his home in Mumbai on 21 April 2021. His last wish was his ashes be immersed by the museum of the submarine he first commanded- INS Kursura and the same was done by his son.

== See also ==
- Annexation of Goa

== Bibliography ==
- Singh, Satyindra (1991), Blueprint to bluewater: The Indian Navy, 1951-65, Lancer International, ISBN 978-8170621485
- Hiranandani, G.M. (1999), Transition to Triumph: History of the Indian Navy, 1965-1975, Spantech & Lancer, ISBN 978-1897829721
- Hiranandani, G M (2005), Transition to eminence : the Indian navy 1976-1990, Lancer Publishers, ISBN 978-8170622666
- Kohli, S N (1989), We Dared: Maritime Operations in the 1971 Indo-Pakistan War, Sangram Books Ltd, ISBN 978-0861322091
- Hiranandani, G. M. (2010), Transition to Guardianship: The Indian Navy 1991-2000, Lancer InterConsult, Incorporated, ISBN 978-1935501268

Military offices
New title New appointment	Flag Officer Submarines; 1987-1988	Succeeded by J. M. S. Sodhi
Preceded by R. R. Sood	Fortress Commander, Andaman and Nicobar Islands; 1986-1987	Succeeded by S. P. Govil
