= Assistant Chief of the Naval Staff =

Assistant Chief of the Naval Staff may refer to:

- Assistant Chief of the Naval Staff (India)
- Assistant Chief of the Naval Staff (United Kingdom)
