= Sushil Kumar (admiral) =

Former Indian Navy chief (died 2019)

Admiral Sushil Kumar Isaacs PVSM, UYSM, AVSM, NM
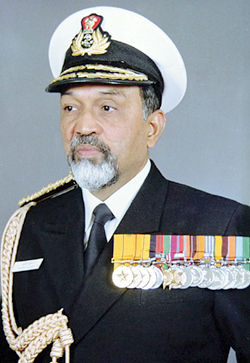

16th Chief of the Naval Staff
- In office 30 December 1998 – 29 December 2001
- President: K. R. Narayanan
- Prime Minister: Atal Bihari Vajpayee
- Preceded by: Vishnu Bhagwat
- Succeeded by: Madhvendra Singh

Personal details
- Born: Neyyoor, Kanyakumari district, Tamil Nadu, India
- Died: 27 November 2019 New Delhi
- Awards: Param Vishisht Seva Medal; Uttam Yudh Seva Medal; Ati Vishisht Seva Medal; Nao Sena Medal

Military service
- Allegiance: India
- Branch/service: Indian Navy
- Years of service: 1961 - 2001
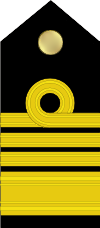
- Rank: Admiral
- Commands: Chief of the Naval Staff; Southern Naval Command; FORTAN
- Battles/wars: Goa Liberation of 1961; Indo-Pakistan War of 1965; Indo-Pakistan War of 1971; Kargil War

Admiral Sushil Kumar Isaacs, PVSM, UYSM, AVSM, NM (died 27 November 2019) was an Indian Navy Admiral who served as Chief of Naval Staff (CNS) of the Indian Navy. He was the Director of Naval Operations during Operation Pawan and Operation Cactus and was the CNS during the Kargil War.

== Early life ==
A native of Neyyoor (Nagercoil), he joined the Indian Navy and was commissioned in 1961. His birth date is unconfirmed by sources but he was most likely born in 1940. He ceased to use his surname of Isaacs because it caused confusion with his brother, who shares the same initials and is also a naval officer. He was an alumnus of The Bishop's School, Pune.

== Naval career ==
A specialist in hydrography and amphibious warfare, Kumar was also a qualified air warfare instructor. He was an alumnus of the National Defence College and was an instructor at the Defence Services Staff College, Wellington. His training abroad included a deputation to the Royal Navy on board HMS Dampier in 1963 and a course in amphibious warfare with the US Navy at Coronado, California, in 1976. He participated in the 1961 invasion of Goa and in both the Indo-Pakistan wars of 1965 and 1971. He was awarded the Nao Sena Medal for gallantry whilst in command of INS Ghorpad.

Kumar was promoted to substantive commander on 1 January 1977 and to captain on 1 January 1983. As Director of Naval Operations, he was decorated with the Uttam Yudh Seva Medal for his exceptional conduct in Operation Pawan and in Operation Cactus (Liberation of Maldives).

=== Flag rank ===
Kumar was promoted to substantive rear admiral on 6 July 1990. Kumar held operational commands and important posts such as the Vice Chief of Naval Staff, the Flag Officer Commanding Maharashtra Naval Area (FOMA), Commander of the Flotilla in Mumbai and Fortress Commander, Andaman and Nicobar Islands (FORTAN). He was the Flag Officer Commanding-in-Chief Southern Naval Command in Kochi, before being appointed the Chief of Naval Staff. Sushil Kumar assumed charge of the Indian Navy, as the 16th Chief of Naval Staff, on 30 December 1998. During his tenure as CNS, He was the highest-decorated serving officer in the Indian Navy, and he retired on 29 December 2001. He was a keen yachtsman and played polo on the international circuit, for which he had an international rating of 4+ goals.

== Death ==
Kumar died on 27 November 2019 at the Indian Army Research and Referral Hospital, Delhi at the age of 79. Prime Minister Narendra Modi expressed his condolences upon this.

== Awards and decorations ==
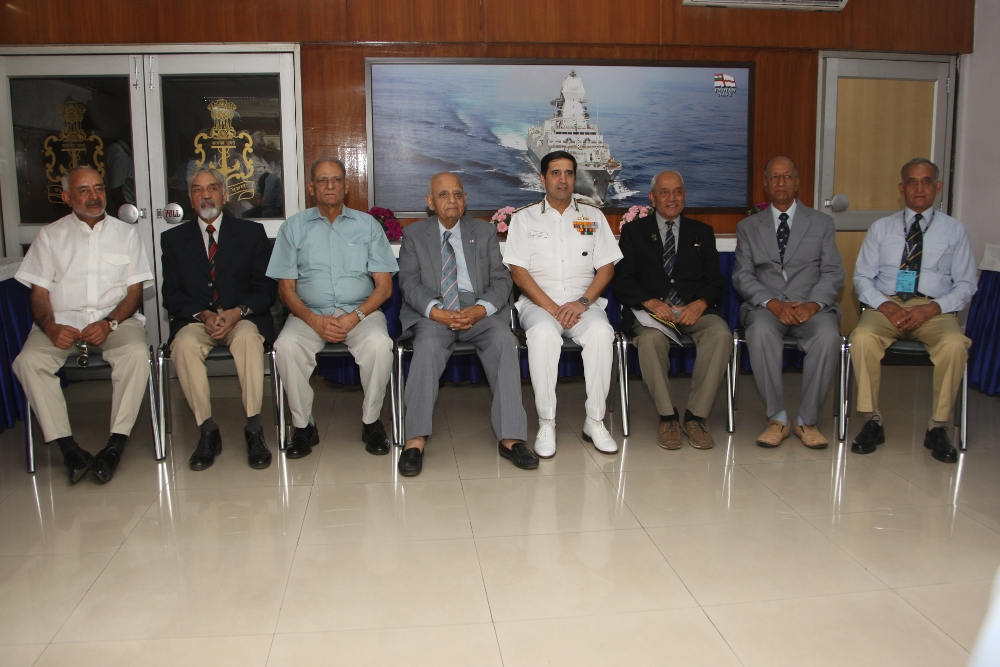
Kumar (2nd from left) with former chiefs and Admiral Robin K. Dhowan at the Conclave of Chiefs, 2015

Param Vishisht Seva Medal	Uttam Yudh Seva Medal	Ati Vishisht Seva Medal	Nausena Medal
General Service Medal	Poorvi Star	Paschimi Star	Special Service Medal
Raksha Medal	Sangram Medal	Sainya Seva Medal	Videsh Seva Medal
50th Anniversary of Independence Medal	25th Anniversary of Independence Medal		30 Years Long Service Medal
20 Years Long Service Medal		9 Years Long Service Medal	

Military offices
Preceded by Ved Prakash Malik	Chairman of the Chiefs of Staff Committee; 1 October 2000 – 29 December 2001	Succeeded by Sundararajan Padmanabhan
Preceded by Vishnu Bhagwat	Chief of the Naval Staff; 1998–29 December 2001	Succeeded by Madhvendra Singh
Preceded by Madhvendra Singh	Flag Officer Commanding-in-Chief Southern Naval Command; 1998-1998	Succeeded by R. N. Ganesh
Preceded by Kailash K Kohli	Vice Chief of the Naval Staff; 1996-1998	Succeeded by P. J. Jacob
Preceded by Kailash K Kohli	Chief of Personnel; 1995-1996	Succeeded by P. J. Jacob
Preceded by P. S. Das	Fortress Commander, Andaman and Nicobar Islands; 1994-1995	Succeeded by R. N. Ganesh
