= Arun Prakash =

Former Chief of the Indian Navy

Admiral Arun Prakash PVSM, AVSM, VrC, VSM
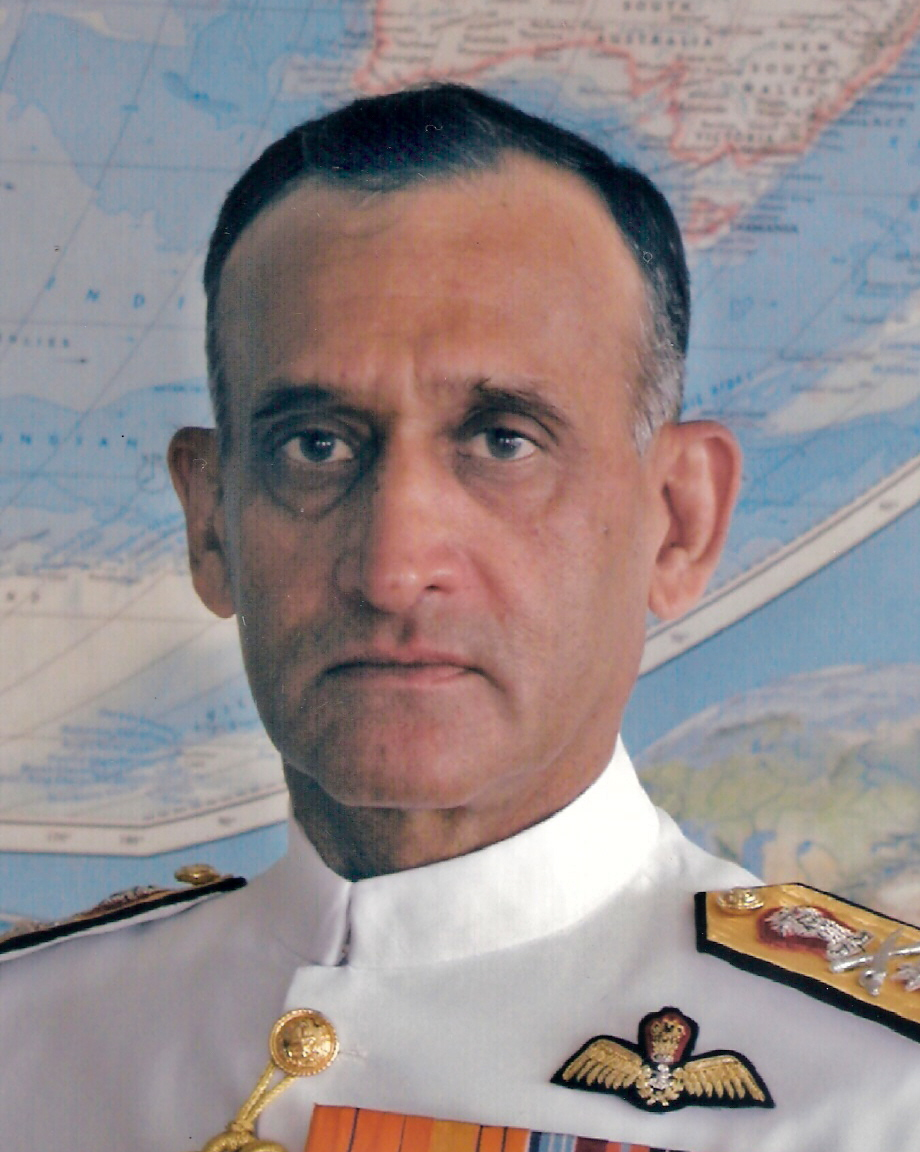

18th Chief of the Naval Staff
- In office 31 July 2004 – 31 October 2006
- President: A. P. J. Abdul Kalam; Pratibha Patil
- Prime Minister: Manmohan Singh
- Preceded by: Madhvendra Singh
- Succeeded by: Sureesh Mehta

Personal details
- Born: October 1944 (age 82) Anantnag, Jammu and Kashmir
- Awards: Param Vishist Seva Medal; Ati Vishist Seva Medal; Vir Chakra; Vishisht Seva Medal

Military service
- Allegiance: India
- Branch/service: Indian Navy
- Years of service: 1966–2006
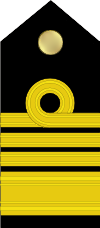
- Rank: Admiral
- Commands: Western Naval Command; Andaman and Nicobar Command; Eastern Fleet; INS Viraat (R22); INS Vindhyagiri (F42); INS Hansa; INAS 300; INS Beas; INS Chatak (K96)
- Battles/wars: Indo-Pakistani War of 1971

Admiral Arun Prakash, PVSM, AVSM, VrC, VSM (born October 1944) is a former flag officer of the Indian Navy. He served as Chief of the Naval Staff from 31 July 2004 to 31 October 2006 and as the Chairman of the Chiefs of Staff Committee from 31 January 2005 to 31 October 2006. He is one of India's most decorated naval officers.

Prakash was born in a military family and raised in Jammu and Kashmir. He joined the National Defence Academy, graduating in 1964. He was commissioned into the Indian Navy in 1966. Trained as a naval aviator, he served on India's first aircraft carrier INS Vikrant. During the Indo-Pakistani War of 1971, he was attached to the No. 20 Squadron IAF. He was awarded the Vir Chakra for leading airstrikes deep into enemy territory.

After the war, in 1976, he attended the Indian Air Force Test Pilot School. He subsequently commanded the Chamak-class missile boat INS Chatak (K96). He also commanded the naval squadron INAS 300 and led its conversion to the Sea Harrier. He then commanded the Leopard-class frigate INS Beas (1958) which was converted to a training ship. He also commanded the Nilgiri-class frigate INS Vindhyagiri (F42). In 1990, he was appointed the third commanding officer of the aircraft carrier INS Viraat (R22). As a commodore, He also commanded the naval air station INS Hansa in Goa.

Prakash was promoted to flag rank in 1993 and appointed Assistant Chief of Naval Staff (Air) (ACNS Air). In 1995, he took command of the Eastern Fleet as the 21st Flag Officer Commanding Eastern Fleet (FOCEF). After a two-year stint, he took over as assistant chief of personnel (ACOP). Promoted to vice admiral, he served as the commandant of the National Defence Academy from 1997 to 1999, after which he took over as chief of personnel at Naval HQ. In 2001, he was appointed the first commander-in-chief of the newly created Andaman and Nicobar Command. He subsequently had stints as the flag officer commanding-in-chief Western Naval Command and vice chief of the Naval Staff.

On 31 July 2004, Prakash assumed office as the 18th chief of the Naval Staff. He took over as the chairman of the Chiefs of Staff Committee on 31 January 2005 from General Nirmal Chander Vij.

== Early life and education ==
Prakash was born and grew up in the Kashmir Valley. His father was in the Kasmir Civil Service and rose to become the district commissioner of Leh. His two elder brothers also joined the Indian Armed Forces, serving in the Indian Army. Although he wanted to join the Navy, he attended college in Chandigarh for two years at the insistence of his father before joining the National Defence Academy (NDA) in 1961. He graduated from NDA in 1964 as the cadet captain of his squadron.

== Career ==
=== Early career ===
Prakash was commissioned into the Indian Navy as an acting sub-lieutenant on 1 January 1966. He volunteered for naval aviation and received flying training from the Indian Air Force (IAF) at Air Force Station Bamrauli. After receiving his 'wings' in 1968, he joined INAS 551 for conversion to Hawker Sea Hawk jet fighter aircraft. He subsequently joined the White Tigers INAS 300 and qualified deck landing on the aircraft carrier INS Vikrant. He also flew the Britten-Norman BN-2 Islander aircraft with INAS 550 and the Vampire and Kiran aircraft with INAS 551. Subsequently, Prakash was one of two naval pilots deputed to the IAF and trained on the Hawker Hunter aircraft at Jamnagar Air Force Station. After training, he joined the 20th Squadron Lightnings at Hindon Air Force Station. Before the outbreak of the Indo-Pakistani War of 1971, the squadron moved to Pathankot Air Force Station.

=== Indo-Pakistani War of 1971 ===
In the 1971 Indo-Pakistan War, for his gallantry in air action over West Pakistan and Jammu and Kashmir, he received the Vir Chakra.

The Vir Chakra citation reads:

CITATION
LIEUTENANT ARUN PRAKASH, (00590-R)

During the operations against Pakistan in December 1971, Lieutenant Arun Prakash was one of the two naval pilots on deputation to the Indian Air Force. On 4 December he led an Indian Air Force strike mission to an enemy airfield. In this mission, he destroyed enemy's heavy transport on ground and returned to base. On 5 December he led a very deep penetration day operational strike into enemy territory and attacked airfields heavily defended by air and ground forces. He destroyed enemy's heavy transport aircraft, attacked troops and supplies and returned to base.

Throughout, Lieutenant Arun Prakash displayed gallantry, leadership and devotion to duty of a high order.

During the conflict, while flying in a Hawker Hunter with the 20th Squadron on a strike mission over Chakala, Praksh destroyed a Beechcraft Queen Air on the ground. The aircraft was assingned by the Pentagon to the then air attaché to Pakistan Chuck Yeager.

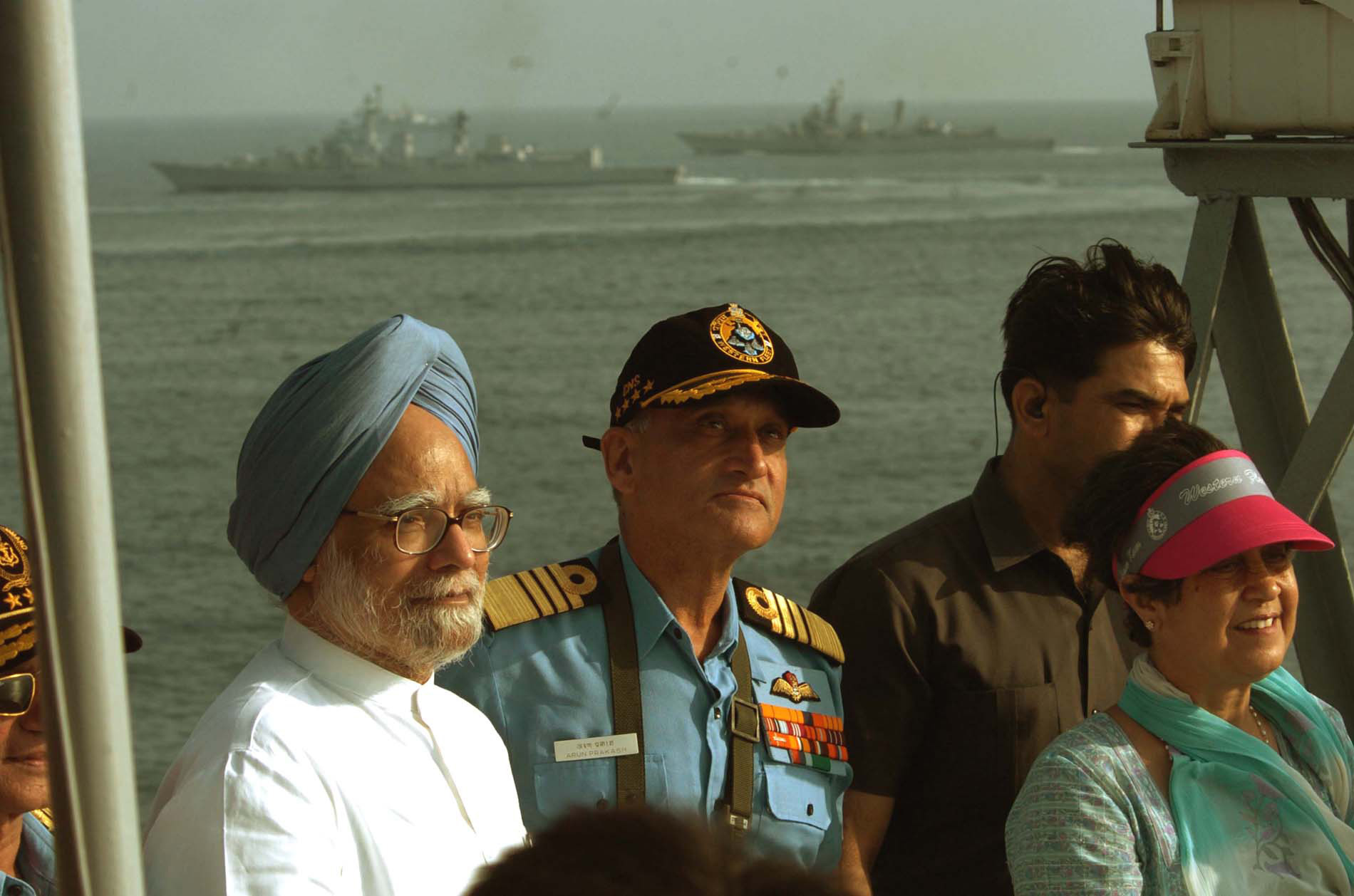
Prakash with Prime Minister Manmohan Singh onboard INS Viraat (R22).

=== Post-War ===
After the war, Prakash served afloat in INS Vikrant (1961), INS Kirpan, and INS Delhi on which he received his watchkeeping ticket. Promoted to lieutenant commander on 1 May 1976, he flew the Super Constellation that year for maritime air reconnaissance with Indian Navy Air Squadron 312. In 1978, he was appointed commanding officer of the Chamak-class missile boat INS Chatak (K96). The following year, he was selected to attend the staff course at the Defence Services Staff College, Wellington. In December 1979, he took over as the squadron commander of INAS 300, serving till May 1980. He was promoted to the rank of commander on 1 July 1980. After the short tenure as 'Tiger Leader', he was appointed commanding officer of the training frigate INS Beas, on which young midshipmen were trained. In November 1979, India placed its first order for six British Aerospace Sea Harrier FRS Mk 51 fighters and two T Mk 60 Trainers. Prakash was selected by the CNS Admiral R. H. Tahiliani to induct the Sea Harriers into the Navy. He took command of INAS 300 for the second time in July 1981. He supervised the training of Indian Navy crew members in the United Kingdom for the Sea Harrier and ferried the newly acquired aircraft back to India in 1983. He was promoted to captain on 1 July 1986. In his aviation assignments, he logged more than 2,500 hours in the air in single and multi-engined, shore-based and carrier-based aircraft. He then took over as captain (air) of the naval air station INS Hansa and subsequently as commanding officer.

After over five years at Goa as squadron commander, captain (air) and CO, Prakash was appointed CO of the antisubmarine warfare frigate INS Vindhyagiri. In 1989, he was selected to attend the Naval War College in Rhode Island. After the course, he returned to India and was appointed the third commanding officer of the new aircraft carrier INS Viraat (R22). He was in command of Viraat till December 1991. In 1992, he was appointed naval assistant to the chief of the Naval Staff Admiral Laxminarayan Ramdas.

=== Flag rank ===
After serving as NA for a year, on 4 January 1993, Prakash was promoted to the rank of rear admiral and appointed assistant chief of Naval Staff (Air) (ACNS Air). On 1 April 1995, after a two-year stint as ACNS, he was appointed the 21st flag officer commanding Eastern Fleet. He was in command of the Eastern Fleet for about a year and a half. In late 1996, he moved to Naval HQ as assistant chief of personnel (ACOP).

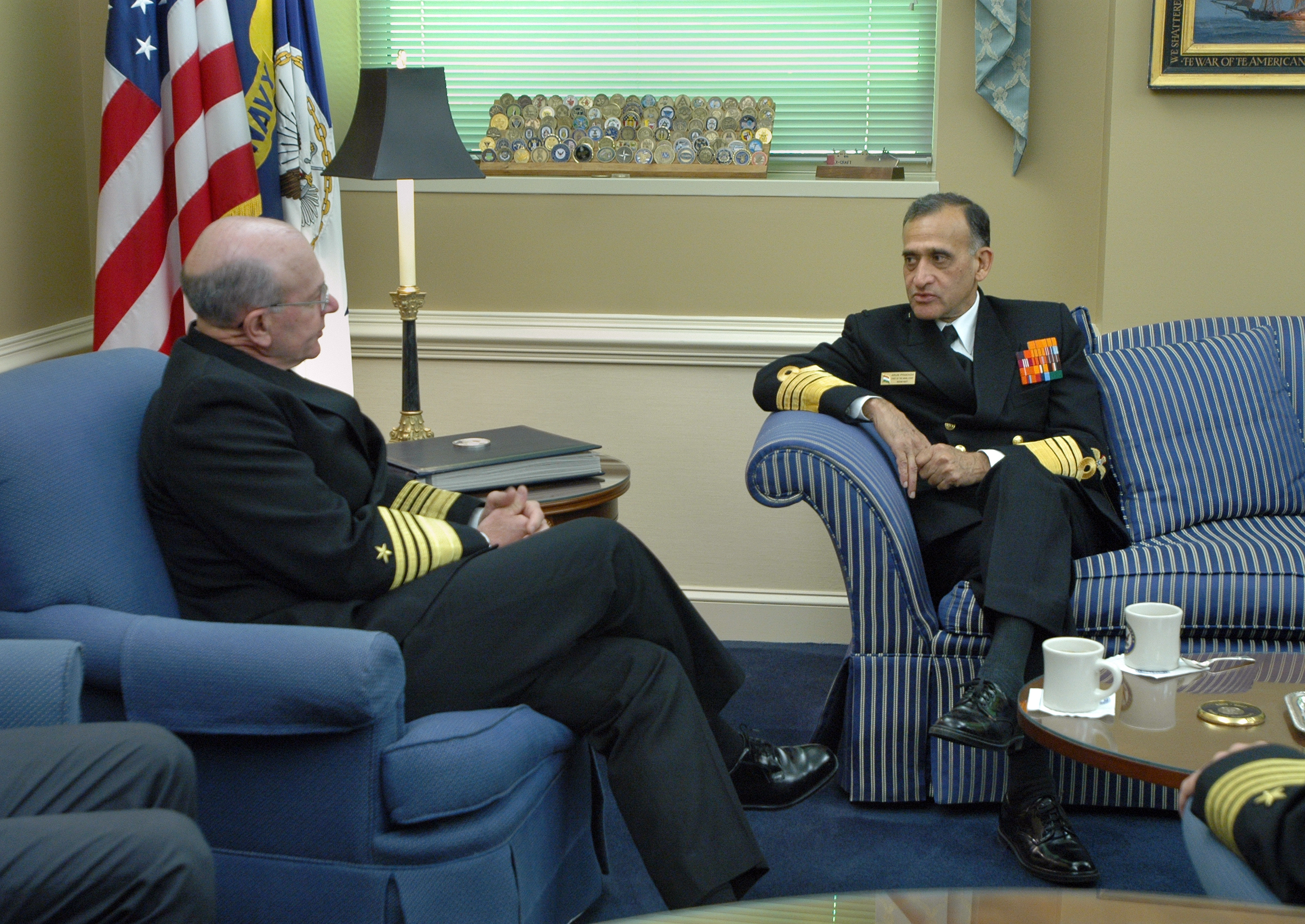
Chairman, COSC & CNS Adm Arun Prakash with CNO Adm Vern Clark in Washington, D.C.

He was then promoted to the rank of vice admiral on 31 July 1997, and took over as the commandant of the National Defence Academy, an appointment he served in till 19 March 1999. He then moved to NHQ, having been appointed chief of personnel. In October 2001, he became the first commander-in-chief of the newly established Andaman and Nicobar Command. Then, on 31 December 2002, he took over as the flag officer commanding-in-chief (FOC-in-C) Western Naval Command. Following this assignment, he was appointed the vice chief of Naval Staff, serving for a brief period from October 2003 to July 2004.

=== Chief of Naval Staff ===
Prakash was promoted to full admiral and was appointed the 20th chief of Naval Staff on 31 July 2004. With the retirement of General Nirmal Chander Vij, Admiral Prakash took over as the chairman of the Chiefs of Staff Committee on 31 January 2005. While serving as chief of Naval Staff, Prakash played an important role in renewing the Indian Navy's relationships with the United States Navy and in developing a vision of India's maritime strategy. Prakash retired as chief of Naval Staff in October 2006. He retired from the post of chairman of the Chiefs of Staff Committee at the same time.

== Post-retirement ==
Prakash settled in Goa after retiring from the Navy. He was the distinguished chair at the Naval War College, Goa, from 2016 to 2022.

Following the sinking of the Iranian IRIS Dena after attending the International Fleet Review 2026 in India by the U.S. Navy, he commented that the attack was shocking in multiple ways. He said "It’s a bit of treachery of the US to attend a peaceful function side-by-side with Iranian navy, where there’s a lot of camaraderie, and then the moment the Iranian ship pops out of harbour, it’s sunk ... They could have delayed this action to spare India this embarrassment." He also said that targeting a guest of India that posed no immediate threat "leaves a very bad taste in my mouth".

== Awards and decorations ==
Prakash was awarded the Vir Chakra in 1972, the Vishisht Seva Medal in 1986, the Ati Vishisht Seva Medal in 1992 and the Param Vishisht Seva Medal in 2002.

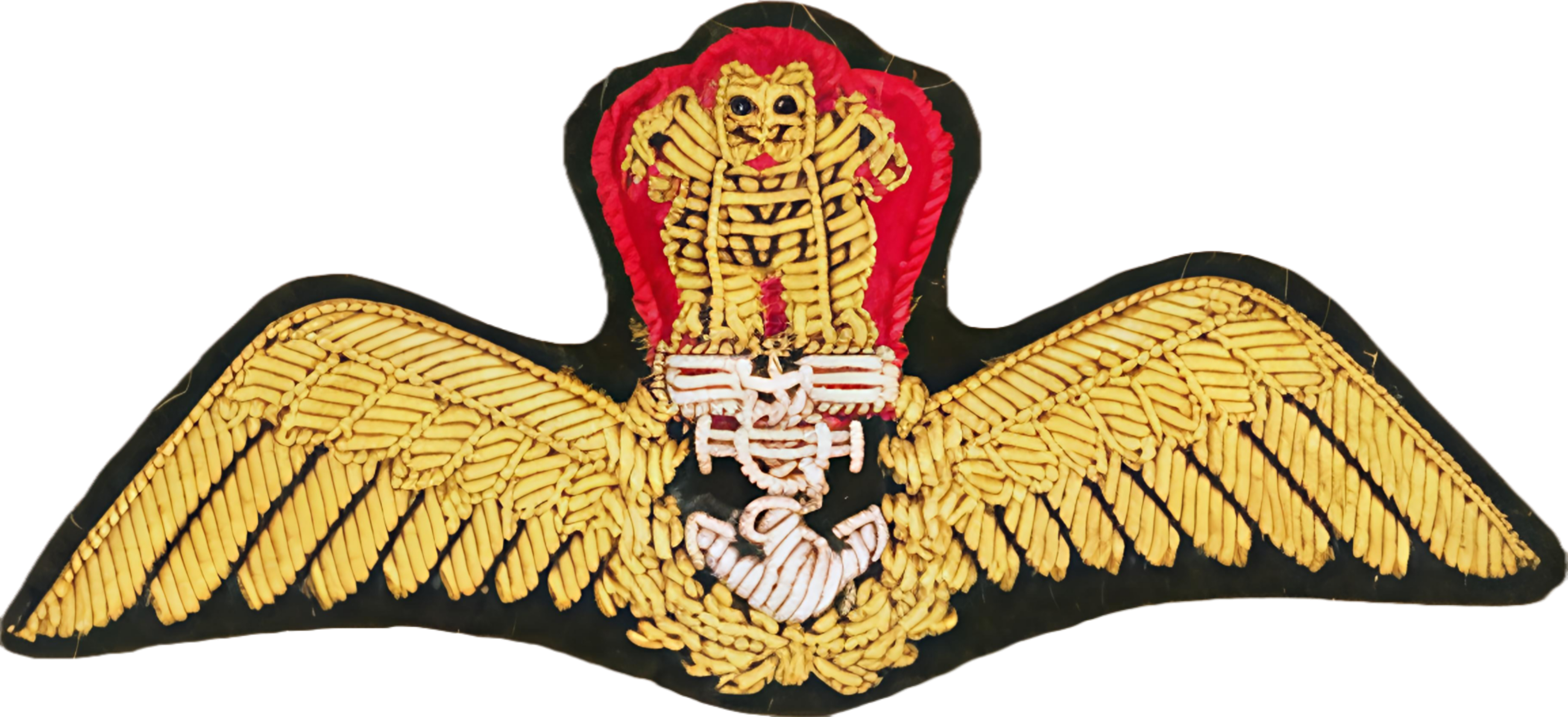

Naval aviator (Pilot) badge
Param Vishisht Seva Medal	Ati Vishisht Seva Medal	Vir Chakra	Vishisht Seva Medal
Samar Seva Star	Paschimi Star	Raksha Medal	Sangram Medal
Operation Parakram Medal	Sainya Seva Medal	50th Independence Anniversary Medal	25th Independence Anniversary Medal
30 Years Long Service Medal	20 Years Long Service Medal		9 Years Long Service Medal

== Published writings ==
- From the Crow's Nest: A Compendium of Speeches and Writings on Maritime and Other Issues, New Delhi: Lancer Publishers, 2007.

== Sources ==
- Official Biography

Military offices
Preceded by Madhvendra Singh	Commanding officer INS Viraat; 1990-1991	Succeeded by Madanjit Singh
Preceded by Harinder Singh	Flag Officer Commanding Eastern Fleet; 1995-1996	Succeeded by O. P. Bansal
Preceded by Air Marshal JS Rai	Commandant of the National Defence Academy; 1997-1999	Succeeded by Lieutenant General SBS Kochar
Preceded by John Colin De Silva	Chief of Personnel; 1999-2001	Succeeded by Madanjit Singh
New title New office	Commander-in-Chief, Andaman and Nicobar Command; 2001–2003	Succeeded by O. P. Bansal
Preceded by Vinod Pasricha	Flag Officer Commanding-in-Chief Western Naval Command; 2003–2003	Succeeded by Madanjit Singh
Preceded by John Colin De Silva	Vice Chief of the Naval Staff; 2003–2004	Succeeded by Yashwant Prasad
Preceded by Madhvendra Singh	Chief of the Naval Staff; 2004–2006	Succeeded by Sureesh Mehta
Preceded by Nirmal Chander Vij	Chairman of the Chiefs of Staff Committee; 2005 - 2006	Succeeded by Shashindra Pal Tyagi
