= Rama Kant Pattanaik =

Vice Admiral Rama Kant Pattanaik PVSM, AVSM, YSM
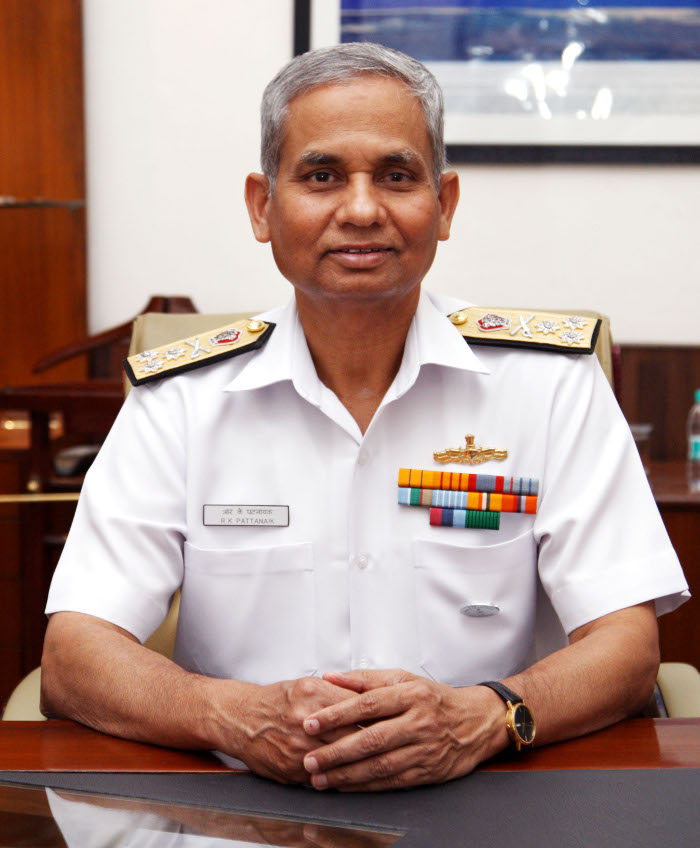
- Spouse: Seli Pattanaik
- Military career
- Allegiance: India
- Branch: Indian Navy
- Service years: 01 January 1978 to 31 October 2015
- Rank: Vice Admiral
- Service number: 01860-A
- Commands: Western Fleet
- Awards: Param Vishisht Seva Medal; Ati Vishisht Seva Medal; Yudh Seva Medal

Vice Admiral Rama Kant Pattanaik, PVSM, AVSM, YSM is the former Deputy Chief of the Naval Staff (DCNS) of Indian Navy and former Deputy Chief of Integrated Defence Staff(DCIDS).

== Education ==
Pattanaik attended the National Defence Academy, as well as the Defence Services Staff College, Wellington, Army War College, Mhow and National Defence College, New Delhi.

== Career ==
He was commissioned into the Indian Navy on 1 January 1978. He retired as DCNS of the Indian Navy on 31 October 2015, and Vice Admiral Karambir Singh, AVSM succeeded him.

== Awards ==

Param Vishisht Seva Medal	Ati Vishisht Seva Medal	Yudh Seva Medal	Special Service Medal
Operation Vijay Medal	Operation Parakram Medal	Videsh Seva Medal	50th Anniversary of Independence Medal
30 Years Long Service Medal	20 Years Long Service Medal		9 Years Long Service Medal

Military offices
Preceded by PK Chatterjee	Deputy Chief of Naval Staff; 2014 - 2015	Succeeded by Karambir Singh
Preceded by Surinder Pal Singh Cheema	Flag Officer Commanding Western Fleet; 1 September 2009 - 17 January 2011	Succeeded by Girish Luthra
Preceded by M. P. Muralidharan	Flag Officer Sea Training; 2007 - 2008	Succeeded by Sunil Lanba
