= ACNS =

ACNS may refer to:

- Assistant Chief of the Naval Staff (India)
- Assistant Chief of the Naval Staff (United Kingdom)
