= Godfrey French =

Captain Godfrey French CBE
- Born: 1 July 1900
- Died: 10 April 1988 (aged 87)
- Military career
- Allegiance: United Kingdom; India
- Branch: Royal Navy; Indian Navy
- Service years: 1913–1949; 1952–1954
- Rank: Captain; Commodore
- Commands: HMS Hawkins; HMS Norfolk
- Conflicts: First World War; Second World War
- Awards: Commander of the Order of the British Empire

Captain Godfrey Alexander French CBE (1 July 1900 – 10 April 1988) was a Royal Navy officer who served as the last British Deputy Chief of the Naval Staff of the Indian Navy.

== Career ==
Following his cadetship from 1913 to 1916, French was appointed midshipman on HMS Emperor of India serving in the Grand Fleet. Promoted to sub-lieutenant, he served as First Lieutenant of HMS Nith. Later, in 1920, he was an undergraduate at Selwyn College, Cambridge. He was appointed a Commander of the Order of the British Empire, Military Division (CBE) in the 1954 Birthday Honours.

Military offices
Preceded by Harold Drew	Deputy Commander-in-Chief; 1954–1955	Succeeded by Ram Dass Katari
