= Vice Chief of the Naval Staff (India) =

Indian military office

- Flag of the Vice Admiral

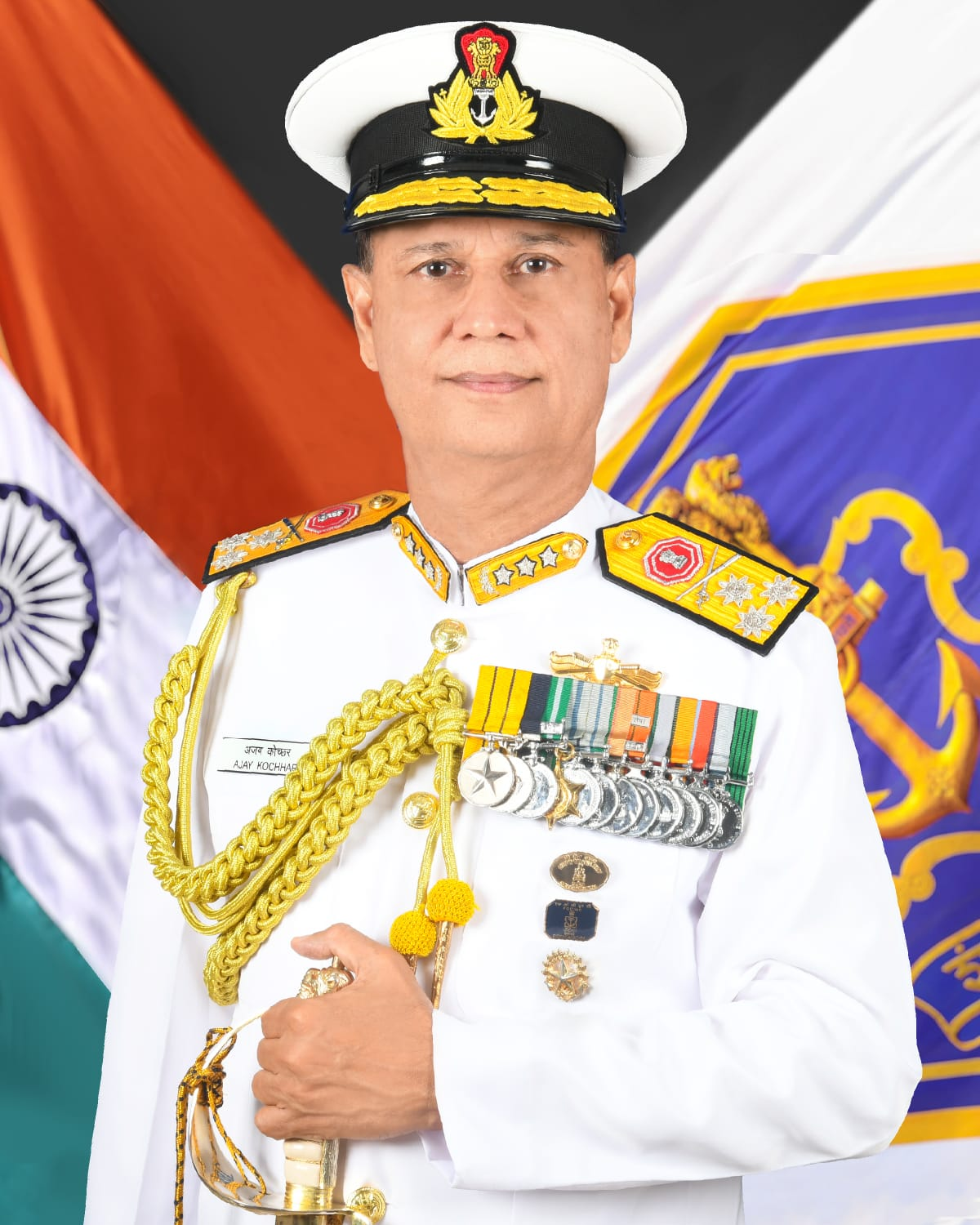
- Incumbent; Vice Admiral Ajay Kochhar; PVSM AVSM NM since 29 May 2026
- Indian Navy
- Type: Principal Staff Officer
- Status: Vice Chief
- Abbreviation: VCNS
- Reports to: Chief of the Naval Staff
- Residence: Residence 5, Nehru Marg Area, New Delhi, Delhi 110011, India
- Seat: Naval Headquarters, New Delhi
- Formation: 11 May 1967
- First holder: Sourendra Nath Kohli

The Vice Chief of the Naval Staff (VCNS) is a statutory position in the Indian Armed Forces, that is usually held by a three star vice admiral. The Vice Chief is the deputy of the Chief of the Naval Staff and is usually the second highest ranking officer of the Indian Navy.

The current VCNS is Vice Admiral Ajay Kochhar who assumed the appointment on 29 May 2026.

== History ==
At the time of independence of India on 15 August 1947, the Chief of Staff to the Commander-in-Chief, Royal Indian Navy was the de facto Second-in-command. The appointment was held by an officer of the rank of Commodore. In 1949, the Chief of Staff was also made Deputy Commander-in-Chief RIN. In 1955, the post was re-designated Deputy Chief of the Naval Staff. In 1959, the post was upgraded to Two-star rank.

On 11 May 1967, the office was re-designated to Vice Chief of the Naval Staff, in line with the Indian Army and Indian Air Force. It was first held by Sourendra Nath Kohli. The appointment was then in the two-star rank of rear admiral. On 12 December 1967, Nilakanta Krishnan succeeded Kohli as VCNS, with the office being raised to the three-star rank of Vice-Admiral in March 1969.

== Organisation ==
The VCNS heads the Staff Branch-I at the Naval Headquarters. The following Directors General/Controllers/Assistant Principal Staff Officers report into the VCNS.

- Chief Hydrographer
- Inspector General Nuclear Safety (IGNS)
- Controller of Warship Production and Acquisition (CWP&A)
- Director General Project Seabird
- Assistant Chief of the Naval Staff (Policy & Plans)
- Assistant Chief of the Naval Staff (Staff Requirements)
- Principal Director Naval Plans (PDNP)
- Integrated Financial Advisor (Navy)
- Director General of Naval Armament (DGONA)
- Director General Naval Armament Inspectorate (DGNAI)
- Scientific Adviser to the Chief of the Naval Staff (SA to CNS)

== Order of precedence ==
The VCNS ranks at No. 23 on the Indian order of precedence, along with the Vice Chiefs of Staff of the Indian Army and Indian Air Force and the Army Commanders (GOC-in-C), Naval Commanders (FOC-in-C) and Air Commanders (AOC-in-C). The VCNS is at the Apex Pay grade (Grade 17), with a monthly pay of ₹225,000 (US$3,200).

== Appointees ==
The following table chronicles the appointees to the office of the Vice Chief of the Naval Staff.

S. No.	Rank	Portrait	Name	Assumed Office	Left office	CNS	Reference
1	Rear Admiral		Sourendra Nath Kohli	11 May 1967	11 December 1967	Admiral Chatterji	
2	Vice Admiral		Nilakanta Krishnan	12 December 1967	20 February 1970	Admiral Chatterji	
3	Vice Admiral		Jal Cursetji	20 February 1970	26 February 1973	Admiral Chatterji	
3	Vice Admiral		Jal Cursetji	20 February 1970	26 February 1973	Admiral Nanda	
4	Vice Admiral		V. A. Kamath	31 March 1973	31 March 1977	Admiral S. N. Kohli	
4	Vice Admiral		V. A. Kamath	31 March 1973	31 March 1977	Admiral Cursetji	
5	Vice Admiral		Ronald Lynsdale Pereira	5 April 1977	28 February 1979	Admiral Cursetji	
6	Vice Admiral		Swaraj Parkash	1 March 1979	31 March 1980	Admiral Ronald Pereira	
7	Vice Admiral		M. R. Schunker	1 April 1980	1 March 1982	Admiral Ronald Pereira	
8	Vice Admiral		Sardari Lal Sethi	1 March 1982	30 May 1983	Admiral Dawson	
9	Vice Admiral		Subimal Mookerjee	31 May 1983	29 April 1984	Admiral Dawson	
10	Vice Admiral		Radhakrishna Hariram Tahiliani	2 May 1984	27 November 1984	Admiral Dawson	
11	Vice Admiral		Kewal Krishan Nayyar	28 November 1984	28 February 1986	Admiral Radhakrishna Tahiliani	
12	Vice Admiral		Jayant Ganpat Nadkarni	28 February 1986	30 November 1987	Admiral Radhakrishna Tahiliani	
13	Vice Admiral		Gulab Mohanlal Hiranandani	8 December 1987	28 February 1989	Admiral Nadkarni	
14	Vice Admiral		Subhash Chandra Chopra	28 February 1989	30 June 1990	Admiral Nadkarni	
15	Vice Admiral		Heathwood Johnson	30 June 1990	31 December 1990	Admiral Nadkarni	
15	Vice Admiral		Heathwood Johnson	30 June 1990	31 December 1990	Admiral Ramdas	
16	Vice Admiral		Surendra Prakash Govil	31 December 1990	31 October 1992	Admiral Ramdas	
17	Vice Admiral		Vijai Singh Shekhawat	31 October 1992	30 September 1993	Admiral Ramdas	
18	Vice Admiral		Sudarshan Kumar Chand	15 October 1993	30 November 1995	Admiral Vijai Shekhawat	
19	Vice Admiral		Kailash Kumar Kohli	30 November 1995	19 October 1996	Admiral Vijai Shekhawat	
19	Vice Admiral		Kailash Kumar Kohli	30 November 1995	19 October 1996	Admiral Bhagwat	
20	Vice Admiral		Sushil Kumar	19 October 1996	31 March 1998	Admiral Bhagwat	
21	Vice Admiral		P. J. Jacob	31 March 1998	28 February 2001	Admiral Bhagwat	
21	Vice Admiral		P. J. Jacob	31 March 1998	28 February 2001	Admiral Sushil Kumar	
22	Vice Admiral		Madhvendra Singh	1 March 2001	1 January 2002	Admiral Sushil Kumar	
23	Vice Admiral		John Colin De Silva	1 January 2002	30 September 2003	Admiral Madhvendra Singh	
24	Vice Admiral		Arun Prakash	17 October 2003	30 July 2004	Admiral Madhvendra Singh	
25	Vice Admiral		Yashwant Prasad	30 July 2004	31 October 2005	Admiral Prakash	
26	Vice Admiral		Venkat Bharathan	31 October 2005	30 November 2006	Admiral Prakash	
26	Vice Admiral		Venkat Bharathan	31 October 2005	30 November 2006	Admiral Mehta	
27	Vice Admiral		Nirmal Kumar Verma	30 November 2006	1 April 2008	Admiral Mehta	
28	Vice Admiral		R. P. Suthan	30 April 2008	30 July 2009	Admiral Mehta	
29	Vice Admiral		D. K. Dewan	1 September 2009	30 August 2011	Admiral Nirmal Verma	
30	Vice Admiral		Robin K. Dhowan	31 August 2011	16 April 2014	Admiral Nirmal Verma	
30	Vice Admiral		Robin K. Dhowan	31 August 2011	16 April 2014	Admiral Joshi	
31	Vice Admiral		Sunil Lanba	2 June 2014	30 March 2015	Admiral Dhowan	
32	Vice Admiral		Parasurama Naidu Murugesan	31 March 2015	30 May 2016	Admiral Dhowan	
33	Vice Admiral		Karambir Singh	31 May 2016	30 October 2017	Admiral Lanba	
34	Vice Admiral		Ajit Kumar P	30 October 2017	30 January 2019	Admiral Lanba	
35	Vice Admiral		G. Ashok Kumar	30 January 2019	31 July 2021	Admiral Lanba	
35	Vice Admiral		G. Ashok Kumar	30 January 2019	31 July 2021	Admiral Karambir Singh	
36	Vice Admiral		Satish Namdeo Ghormade	31 July 2021	31 March 2023	Admiral Karambir Singh	
36	Vice Admiral		Satish Namdeo Ghormade	31 July 2021	31 March 2023	Admiral R. Hari Kumar	
37	Vice Admiral		Sanjay Jasjit Singh	1 April 2023	31 December 2023	Admiral R. Hari Kumar	
38	Vice Admiral		Dinesh Kumar Tripathi	4 January 2024	30 April 2024	Admiral R. Hari Kumar	
39	Vice Admiral		Krishna Swaminathan	1 May 2024	31 July 2025	Admiral Dinesh Tripathi	
40	Vice Admiral		Sanjay Vatsayan	1 August 2025	29 May 2026	Admiral Dinesh Tripathi	
41	Vice Admiral		Ajay Kochhar	29 May 2026	Incumbent	Admiral Krishna Swaminathan	

== See also ==
- Chief of the Naval Staff
- Vice Chief of the Air Staff
- Vice Chief of the Army Staff
- Deputy Chief of the Naval Staff

== Notes ==
1.Later promoted to the rank of Admiral and to the post of the Chief of Naval Staff.
