= INS Chatak =

Coordinates: 9.953810°N 76.280873°E

History

India
- Name: INS Chatak
- Commissioned: 9 February 1977
- Decommissioned: 5 May 2005
- Status: Preserved at INS Venduruthy

General characteristics
- Class & type: Chamak class missile boat
- Displacement: 245 tons (full load)
- Length: 38.6 meters
- Beam: 7.6 meters
- Speed: 37+ knots
- Complement: 30
- Armament: 4 × SS-N-2A Styx AShM; 1 × SA-N-5 SAM; 2 × AK-230 30mm guns

INS Chatak (K96) was a Chamak class missile boat of the Indian Navy.
