= Madhvendra Singh =

Former Chief of the Indian Navy

Admiral Madhvendra Singh PVSM, AVSM, ADC
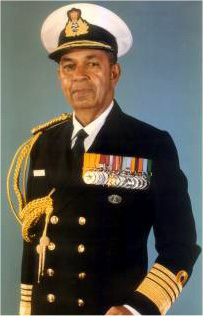

17th Chief of the Naval Staff
- In office 29 December 2001 – 31 July 2004
- President: K. R. Narayanan; A. P. J. Abdul Kalam
- Prime Minister: Atal Bihari Vajpayee; Manmohan Singh
- Preceded by: Sushil Kumar (admiral)
- Succeeded by: Arun Prakash

Personal details
- Awards: Param Vishist Seva Medal; Ati Vishist Seva Medal

Military service
- Allegiance: India
- Branch/service: Indian Navy
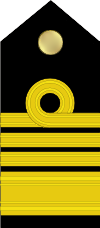
- Rank: Admiral
- Commands: Chief of the Naval Staff; Western Naval Command; National Defence Academy; Western Fleet; INS Viraat; INS Ranvir
- Battles/wars: India-Pakistan War 1965; Bangladesh Liberation War; Operation Vijay 1999

Admiral Madhvendra Singh, PVSM, AVSM, ADC was Chief of Naval Staff of the Indian Navy between 29 December 2001 and his retirement from service on 31 July 2004. He had by that date completed over 41 years of service. He was also the Chairman of the Chiefs of Staff Committee from 2002 to 2004

== Career ==
Madhvendra Singh is a son of Major General K Bhagwati Singh and was educated at St. Xavier's School, Jaipur, in the Indian state of Rajasthan. His military career began in July 1958 when he joined the National Defence Academy, from which he moved to the Indian Navy in January 1963.

He won various awards early in his naval career and chose to specialise in Gunnery, for which purpose he subsequently attended courses at the National Defence College in New Delhi, as well as abroad at institutions such as the Royal Military College of Science at Shrivenham, United Kingdom, the Defence Services Staff College in Wellington, Tamil Nadu and the Naval War College at Newport, USA. He was promoted to lieutenant-commander on 16 February 1973 and to commander on 1 July 1977.

Aside from his numerous staff appointments, Singh commanded INS Viraat, INS Ranvir and INS Talwar, which are an aircraft carrier, a guided missile destroyer and a frigate, respectively. He also commanded the Naval Academy at Kochi. He was promoted to captain on 1 July 1983, and was promoted to rear admiral on 13 September 1990.

Active service operations in which Singh was involved include the 1961 actions in Goa and in both the 1965 and 1971 Indo-Pakistani wars. His later operations included the 1987 Operation Pawan in Sri Lanka and acting as commander of the Western Maritime Theatre during the Kargil War of 1999.

Singh has been awarded both the Param Vishist Seva Medal and the Ati Vishist Seva Medal for his service.

== Family ==
He is married to Kaumudi Kumari and has a daughter and a son.

== Awards and decorations ==

Param Vishisht Seva Medal	Ati Vishisht Seva Medal	General Service Medal	Samar Seva Star
Paschimi Star	Special Service Medal	Operation Vijay Star	Raksha Medal
Sangram Medal	Operation Vijay Medal	Videsh Seva Medal	50th Anniversary of Independence Medal
25th Anniversary of Independence Medal	30 Years Long Service Medal	20 Years Long Service Medal	9 Years Long Service Medal

Military offices
Preceded by Sundararajan Padmanabhan	Chairman of the Chiefs of Staff Committee; 2002-2004	Succeeded by Srinivasapuram Krishnaswamy
Preceded by Sushil Kumar	Chief of the Naval Staff; 2001–2004	Succeeded by Arun Prakash
Preceded by P. J. Jacob	Vice Chief of the Naval Staff; 2001–2001	Succeeded by John Colin De Silva
Preceded by A. R. Tandon	Flag Officer Commanding Western Fleet; 1992-1994	Succeeded by R N Ganesh
Preceded by Vinod Pasricha	Commanding officer INS Viraat; 1988-1990	Succeeded by Arun Prakash
