= Assistant Chief of the Naval Staff (India) =

- Flag of the ACNS (Rear Admiral flag)
- Indian Navy
- Type: Assistant Principal Staff Officer (APSO)
- Abbreviation: ACNS
- Seat: Naval Headquarters, New Delhi
- Formation: 1967

The Assistant Chief of the Naval Staff (ACNS) is a senior appointment in the Indian Navy. The ACNS is an assistant PSO (Principal Staff Officer) at Naval Headquarters in New Delhi. At present, there are eight appointments of ACNS who head different directorates. The appointments are held by a Two star officer in the rank of Rear Admiral.

== History ==
The appointment of ACNS was created in 1967. The Chief of Naval Aviation (CONA) was re-designated Assistant Chief of Naval Staff. The ACNS was responsible for the directorates of Air Staff and Air Materiel and was held by an officer of the rank of Commodore. The first officer to hold the appointment was Comodore Nilakanta Krishnan. In 1969, it was decided to redistribute responsibilities amongst appointments at naval headquarters. The directorates of Submarines, Acquisition project and Meteorology were added to the ACNS.

In 1972, the appointment was re-designated Deputy Chief of the Naval Staff (India) and upgraded to the rank of Rear Admiral. An assistant PSO in the rank of Rear admiral was created and called ACNS (Policy & Plans), reporting to the Vice Chief of the Naval Staff. The ACNS (P&P) had the directorates of Plans, Works and Acquisitions under him. A new directorate of Management Services was created in 1974 and placed under ACNS (P&P). In 1984, the appointments of Director Naval Operations (DNO) and Director Naval Air Staff (DNAS) were upgraded to the rank of Rear admiral and designated ACNS (Ops) and ACNS (Air) respectively. They reported into the Deputy Chief of the Naval Staff.

In 1996, the submarine arm was reorganised and the appointment of ACNS (Submarines) was created as a class authority coordinating all aspects of submarine operations, logistics and maintenance. The ACNS (SM) would function as the senior submarine advisor at NHQ and report into the Controller of Warship Production and Acquisition (CWP&A). The Flag Officer Submarines dual-hatted as the ACNS (SM) until 2001, when it was created as a separate billet. The post of ACNS (Special Submarine Projects) was created in 2001 and is responsible for all aspects related to the acquisition of special platforms built indigenously or from abroad and creation of related infrastructure for all special projects. The ACNS (SSP) reports into the Inspector General Nuclear Safety.

In 2005, a new Assistant PSO position of ACNS (Foreign Cooperation and Transformation) was created with the Directorates of Foreign Cooperation (DFC), Foreign Liaison (DFL) and Strategy, Concepts and Transformation (DSCT) under it. A year later, it was rechristened ACNS (Foreign Cooperation and Intelligence) with the Directorate of Intelligence under it. In 2012, the post of ACNS (Communications, Space and Network Centric Operations) was created with a plan to seamlessly integrate all combat platforms and terrestrial nodes through state-of-the art communications and space systems towards network-centric operations.

In 2013, a Technical Assistant PSO was created under the Deputy Chief of the Naval Staff - ACNS (Air Materiel). The same year, the position of ACNS (Ops) was upgraded to the rank of Vice Admiral and redesignated Director General Naval Operations (DGNO). In 2018, the post of ACNS (Staff Requirements) was created under the Vice Chief of Naval Staff.

== Current organisation ==
There are eight appointments of Assistant Chief of Naval Staff at naval headquarters. Four each are under the Staff Branch-I and Staff Branch-II headed by the Vice Chief of Naval Staff and Deputy Chief of Naval Staff respectively.

=== Assistant Chief of the Naval Staff (Policy & Plans) ===
The directorates under the ACNS (P&P) are:

- Directorate of Naval Plans
- Directorate of Works

=== Assistant Chief of the Naval Staff (Air) ===
The directorates under the ACNS (Air) are:

- Directorate of Naval Air Staff
- Directorate of Aircraft Acquisition
- Directorate of Air Warfare and Flight Safety
- Directorate of Aviation Projects Management

=== Assistant Chief of the Naval Staff (Submarines) ===
The ACNS (SM) reports into the Controller of Warship Production and Acquisition (CWP&A). The directorate under the ACNS (Submarines) is:

- Directorate of Submarine Acquisition

=== Assistant Chief of the Naval Staff (Special Submarine Projects) ===
The ACNS (SSP) reports into the Inspector General Nuclear Safety. The directorates under the ACNS (SSP) are:

- Directorate of Nuclear Submarine Acquisition
- Directorate of Nuclear Submarine Project & Infrastructure

=== Assistant Chief of the Naval Staff (Foreign Cooperation and Intelligence) ===
The directorates under the ACNS (FCI) are:

- Directorate of Naval Intelligence
- Directorate of Foreign Co-operation
- Media and Public Information Cell

=== Assistant Chief of the Naval Staff (Communications, Space and Network Centric Operations) ===
The ACNS (CSNCO) reports into the Director General Naval Operations (DGNO). The directorates under the ACNS (CSNCO) are:

- Directorate of Naval Signals
- Directorate Network and Space Operations
- Directorate of Network Centric Operations

=== Assistant Chief of the Naval Staff (Air Materiel) ===
The directorates under the ACNS (AM) are:

- Directorate Aircraft Systems Engineering
- Directorate of Air Projects & Plans
- Directorate of Air Logistics Support

=== Assistant Chief of the Naval Staff (Staff Requirements) ===
The directorates under the ACNS (SR) are:

- Directorate of Staff Requirements
- Directorate of Nuclear, Biological and Chemical Defence

== See also ==
- Vice Chief of the Naval Staff
- Deputy Chief of the Naval Staff

== Bibliography ==
- Hiranandani, Gulab Mohanlal (1999), Transition to Triumph: History of the Indian Navy, 1965-1975, Spantech & Lancer, ISBN 978-1897829721
- Hiranandani, Gulab Mohanlal (2005), Transition to eminence : The Indian Navy 1976-1990, Lancer Publishers, ISBN 978-8170622666
- Hiranandani, Gulab Mohanlal (2009), Transition to Guardianship: The Indian Navy, 1991–2000, Lancer Publishers LLC, ISBN 978-1-935501-66-4
- Singh, Anup (2018), Blue Waters Ahoy! The Indian Navy 2001–2010, HarperCollins Publishers, ISBN 9789353025526
- Doraibabu, M; Godbole, Amrut (2023), A Decade of Transformation: The Indian Navy 2011-2021, Harper Collins Publishers India, ISBN 9789394407909
