= INS Satavahana =

Submarine training base of the Indian Navy

Coordinates: 18°55′34.46″N 72°50′11.56″E

- Visakhapatnam, Andhra Pradesh
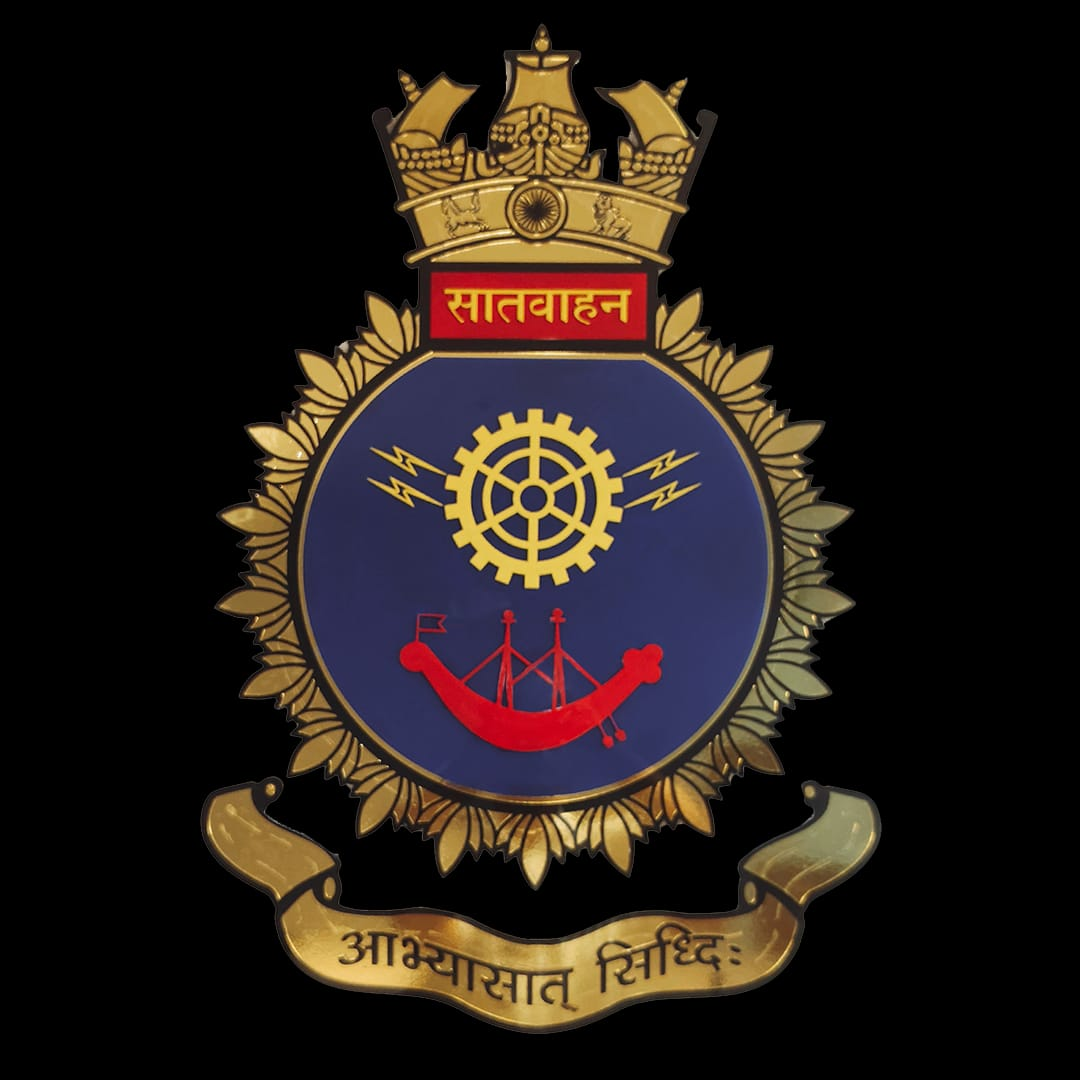

Site information
- Type: Naval Submarine Warfare School
- Controlled by: Indian Navy

Site history
- Built: 21 November 1974
- In use: 1974–present

Garrison information
- Current commander: Commodore Dhiraj Khanna
- Occupants: Eastern Naval Command

INS Satavahana is the premier Submarine Training Base of the Indian Navy and is located at Visakhapatnam, Andhra Pradesh. Training is carried out by the Submarine School (SMS), the Escape Training School (ETS) and the School of Advanced Undersea Warfare (SAUW).

== History ==
The unit was originally an integrated training establishment set up on 11 March 1974 for the purpose of training officers and sailors for ships and submarines of Soviet origin. The establishment was later named INS Satavahana and commissioned on 21 December 1974. In 1986 it was decided to disband the surface training school and convert INS Satavahana to an exclusive submarine training establishment.

School of Advanced Undersea Warfare (SAUW) was established in December 2006 inside the premises of INS Satavahana, to train the crew of submarines of the nuclear submarines (Arihant-class submarine). The training for the Kalvari-class submarines is also being set up here.

On 13 September 2024, Indian Navy commissioned Kalvari Submarine Escape Training Facility, Vinetra, at INS Satavahana, Visakhapatnam to train personnel of all Kalvari-class submarine about escape procedures for a distress situation. The facility was constructed by Larsen & Toubro and is equipped with a five-meter escape tower integrated with an adjacent diving basin. This an addition to the Submarine Escape Training Facilities that were already established here in 1980s for crews of Sindhughosh-class and Shishumar-class submarines.

== Objective ==
The primary role of this establishment is to impart world class submarine and escape training to meet the stringent performance objectives and exacting standards of the Submarine Arm. It is the only integrated training establishment in the Indian Navy, as it carries out training for all branches of officers and sailors of the Submarine Arm. The conducts an entry level, year-long basic course which every submariner has to undergo. Six months are spent on training in campus followed by an equal amount of time on board an operational submarine. Following this the sailors are examined by a board of senior submariners and awarded the coveted Dolphin Badge on qualification and commissioned as submariners in the Indian Navy.

Training is also conducted for personnel from foreign navies, thus making it the most sought after submarine training establishments in the whole of South East Asia. Personnel from 25 countries including Vietnam, Bhutan, Myanmar, Nepal, Sri Lanka and South Africa have been trained here.

Apart from training, the unit has been entrusted with the upkeep and running of various facilities of the Eastern Naval Command. The Indian Naval Sports Control Cell (Vizag), Command Auditorium Samudrika, the Command Stadium, KV II in 104 area, Little Angels School in Dolphin Hill, Eastern Naval Command Polo and Equestrian Training Centre (ENPET).

== Crest ==
The crest of INS Satavahana depicts on the upper half, a steering wheel surrounded by a cogged wheel with sparks emanating from its sides. The lower half contains a representation of an erstwhile ship taken from a coin of Satavahana dynasty. It represents the integrated type of submarine training being imparted at the establishment to the sailors of the Seaman, Engineering and Electrical branches. Satavahana's motto in Sanskrit, Abhyasata Sidhi means, Practice Leads to Achievement.

== See also ==
Indian navy

- List of Indian Navy bases
- List of active Indian Navy ships

Integrated commands and units

- Armed Forces Special Operations Division
- Defence Cyber Agency
- Integrated Defence Staff
- Integrated Space Cell
- Indian Nuclear Command Authority
- Indian Armed Forces
- Special Forces of India

Other lists

- Strategic Forces Command
- List of Indian Air Force stations
- List of Indian Navy bases
- India's overseas military bases
