= Yudh Seva Medal =

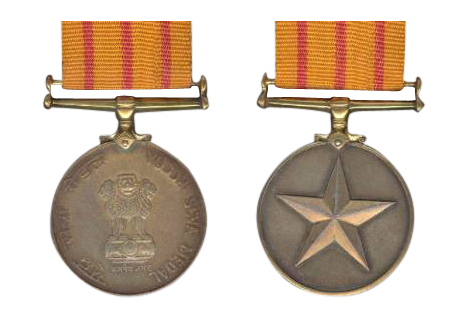
- Type: Military medal Service medal
- Awarded for: Wartime Distinguished Service
- Country: India
- Presented by: President of India
- Ribbon
- Established: June 26, 1980

Precedence
- Next (higher): Uttam Yudh Seva Medal
- Equivalent: Vishisht Seva Medal (Note: Though the Vishisht Seva Medal is placed below the Yudh Seva Medal in the precedence, it is considered as a peacetime equivalent of Yudh Seva Medal.)
- Next (lower): Sena Medal (Army); Nau Sena Medal (Navy); Vayu Sena Medal (Air Force)

The Yudh Seva Medal (lit. 'War Service Medal') is one of India's military decorations for distinguished service during wartime. It is awarded for a high degree of distinguished service in an operational context, which includes times of war, conflict, or hostilities and may be awarded posthumously.

The award is the wartime equivalent of the Vishisht Seva Medal, which is a peacetime distinguished service decoration.

In 2019, Minty Agarwal became the first woman given the Yudh Seva Medal.

== Eligibility ==
The Yudh Seva Medal may be awarded posthumously. It is awarded for distinguished service of an exceptional order during war/conflict/hostilities. It may be awarded to all ranks of the Army, the Navy and the Air Force including those of Territorial Army Units, Auxiliary and Reserve Forces and other lawfully constituted Armed forces when embodied, as well as nursing Officers and other members of the Nursing Services in the Armed Forces.

== Design ==
The medal is circular in shape, 35mm in diameter and fitted to a plain horizontal bar with standard fittings. The medal is of gold gilt. The medal has on its obverse the State Emblem and the inscriptions in Hindi and English embossed along the upper rim. On its reverse, it has a five pointed star. The riband is in Gold colour with three red vertical stripes dividing it into four equal parts.

If a recipient of the medal is subsequently awarded the medal again, every such further award shall be recognized by a Bar to be attached to the riband by which the medal is suspended. For every such Bar, a miniature insignia of a pattern approved by the Government shall be added to the riband when worn alone. The medal may be awarded posthumously.
