= Nau Sena Medal =

Indian Navy Gallantry Award

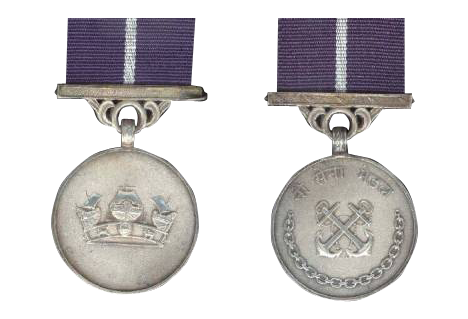
- Nau Sena Medal
- Type: Military medal
- Awarded for: "Awarded for such individual acts of exceptional devotion to duty or courage as have special significance for the Navy."
- Country: Republic of India
- Presented by: Republic of India
- Eligibility: All ranks of the navy.
- Established: 17 June 1960
- Service Ribbon

Order of Wear
- Next (higher): Yudh Seva Medal
- Equivalent: Sena Medal (Army); Vayu Sena Medal (Air Force)
- Next (lower): Vishisht Seva Medal

Nau Sena Medal (also spelt Nao Sena Medal, lit. Navy Medal) is a gallantry award for servicemen in the Indian Navy awarded for such individual acts of exceptional devotion to duty or courage as have special significance for the Navy.

== History ==
The Nau Sena Medal was instituted on 26 January 1960 by the Government of India, with the approval of the President of India. Five other medals were instituted on the same day - the Vishisht Seva Medal series (Class I, Class II, Class III), (Note: These awards were later renamed Param Vishisht Seva Medal, Ati Vishisht Seva Medal and Vishisht Seva Medal respectively.) the Sainya Seva Medal, Videsh Seva Medal, Sena Medal and the Vayu Sena Medal.

== Design ==
The medal is pentangular in shape, with curved sides made of standard silver. The mounting shall is a fixed ring attached to a metal stripe 3mm wide ornamented with Ashoka leaves. It has embossed on its obverse the Naval Crest. On its reverse, it has a trident within a circle and rope and the inscription "Nau Sena Medal", in Hindi, embossed along the upper rim.

The riband is navy blue colour with a white thin silver stripe down the centre. 32 mm, dark blue with a 2 mm white central strips. Dark blue 15 mm, white 2 mm, dark blue 15 mm.

== See also ==
- Sena Medal
- Vayu Sena Medal
