= INS Shakti (A57) =

Deepak-class fleet tanker

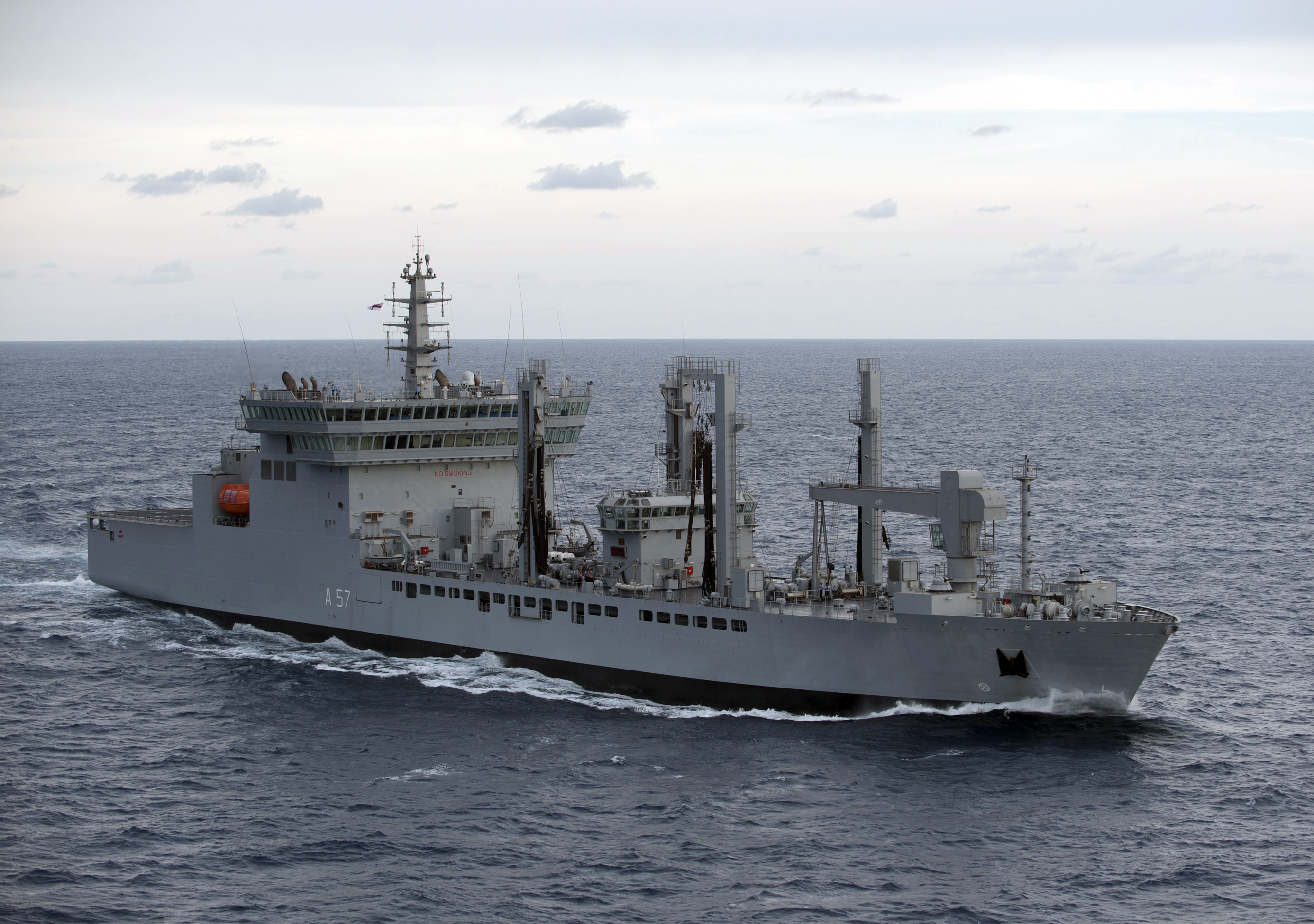
- INS Shakti

History

India
- Name: Shakti
- Builder: Fincantieri; Bharat Electronics
- Yard number: 6186
- Launched: 11 October 2010
- Commissioned: 1 October 2011
- Identification: IMO number: 9613915; MMSI number: 419000368; Callsign: AWOA
- Motto: Anything, Anywhere
- Status: Active

General characteristics
- Class & type: Deepak-class fleet tanker
- Displacement: 27,550 t (27,110 long tons)
- Length: 175 m (574 ft 2 in)
- Beam: 25 m (82 ft 0 in)
- Draft: 9.1 m (29 ft 10 in) (maximum)
- Depth: 19.3 m (63 ft 4 in)
- Decks: 10
- Installed power: 2 × MAN diesel engines, 19.2 MW (25,700 hp)
- Propulsion: Single shaft; controllable-pitch propeller
- Speed: 20 knots (37 km/h; 23 mph)
- Endurance: 10,000 nmi (19,000 km; 12,000 mi) at 16 knots (30 km/h; 18 mph)
- Complement: 180 sailors and 20 officers
- Electronic warfare & decoys: Chaff launcher system
- Armament: 4 × AK-630 close-in weapons system
- Aircraft carried: Various helicopters
- Aviation facilities: Aviation hangar
- Notes: Cargo capacity: 17,900 t (17,600 long tons; 19,700 short tons) at full load

INS Shakti (A57) (lit. Strength) is a Deepak-class fleet tanker in service with the Indian Navy. She was built by Fincantieri, an Italian shipbuilding company based in Trieste. She is the second and final ship of her class. Shakti, along with her predecessor Deepak, is one of the largest ships of the Indian Navy.

The construction of the vessel began in November 2009 and she was launched in October 2010. She was handed over to India by September 2011 and was commissioned on 1 October 2011. The construction of the vessel was completed in a record time of 27 months, after the contract worth €159.32 million was signed in April 2008.

INS Shakti can refuel four ships at a time, with a fuelling speed of 1,500 tonnes per hour while her predecessors had a speed of 300 per hour. She is also equipped with state-of-the art electronics, medical facilities and storage spaces. According to Admiral Nirmal Verma, Shakti would significantly add to the Indian Navy's ability to conduct and sustain operations distant from the coast.

== Design and description ==
=== General characteristics and propulsion ===
INS Shakti has a length of 175 metres (574 ft 2 in) overall, a beam of 25 m (82 ft 0 in) and a draught of 9.1 m (29 ft 10 in). The ship displaces about 27,550 tonnes (27,110 long tons) at full load. The complement is about 200, including 20 officers.

The ship is powered by two MAN diesel engines providing a total power of 19.2 megawatts (25,700 hp). This allows the ship to reach a maximum speed of 20 knots (37 km/h; 23 mph) and an endurance of 10,000 nautical miles (19,000 km; 12,000 mi) at 16 knots (30 km/h; 18 mph).

To help prevent accidental oil spills, the ship features a double hull configuration in compliance with MARPOL 73/78.

=== Capacity ===
The Deepak-class tanker can carry 17,900 tonnes (17,600 long tons; 19,700 short tons) of cargo, including 15,500 tonnes (15,300 long tons; 17,100 short tons) of liquid cargo (water, ship and aircraft fuel) and 500 tonnes (490 long tons; 550 short tons) of solid cargo (food and ammunition). The modern cargo handling facility on board the ship enables transfer of heavy solid cargo via a 30-tonne (30-long-ton; 33-short-ton) capacity deck crane, and simultaneous fuelling of multiple ships at sea at the rate of 1,500 tonnes (1,500 long tons; 1,700 short tons) per hour. Workshop facilities on the ship can support other ships of the fleet and are capable of supporting heavy helicopters.

=== Self-defence systems ===
The ship has self-defence capabilities and is equipped with an indigenous anti-missile defence chaff system. On-board systems include fully automatic engine controls, power management and battle damage control systems. According to the navy, the ship was designed to operate as a command platform. The ship is fitted with four AK-630 close-in weapon systems, which can fire at a rate of 4,000 to 10,000 rounds a minute.

== Construction and service ==
Fincantieri was awarded the contract to construct Shakti in April 2008 at a cost of €159.32 million. The Deepak-class tankers were the first warships constructed for India by Fincantieri. The construction of the ship began in November 2009 at Fincantieri's Sestri Ponente shipyard in Italy. The sea trials started in December 2010. The ship was formally handed over to the Indian Navy on 23 September 2011, in under two years. Admiral Nirmal Verma, the chief of the Naval Staff, commissioned the tanker at Visakhapatnam, the home of the Eastern Naval Command, and noted that the ship had enhanced the reach of the navy well beyond the limits of the Indian Ocean.

There were allegations of the then ruling UPA government having engaged in corruption by allowing Fincantieri to build Shakti and Deepak using commercial grade steel, instead of military grade steel as is the norm. The Comptroller and Auditor General of India had questioned why the order was not given to Rosoboronexport, which had offered to use military grade steel for the construction of the tankers. India Today reported that the Defence Minister of the succeeding government, Manohar Parrikar, had ordered a probe into the matter. The Defence Ministry issued a press release the next day, clarifying that no probe had been ordered, and that steel of an inferior quality had not been used, but did not clarify why military grade steel was not used. The same day, Kirit Somaiya, an MP on the Public Accounts Committee, demanded a probe into the matter.

Shakti is the third tanker in the navy with the same name. The first Shakti had a displacement of 3,000 tonnes (3,000 long tons) and was commissioned during World War II. She was in service with the Indian Navy from 29 January 1954 and decommissioned on 31 December 1967. The second Shakti, a large ship built by the German shipyard Bremer Vulkan, was commissioned on 21 February 1976 and decommissioned on 21 July 2007, after more than 31 years of naval service.

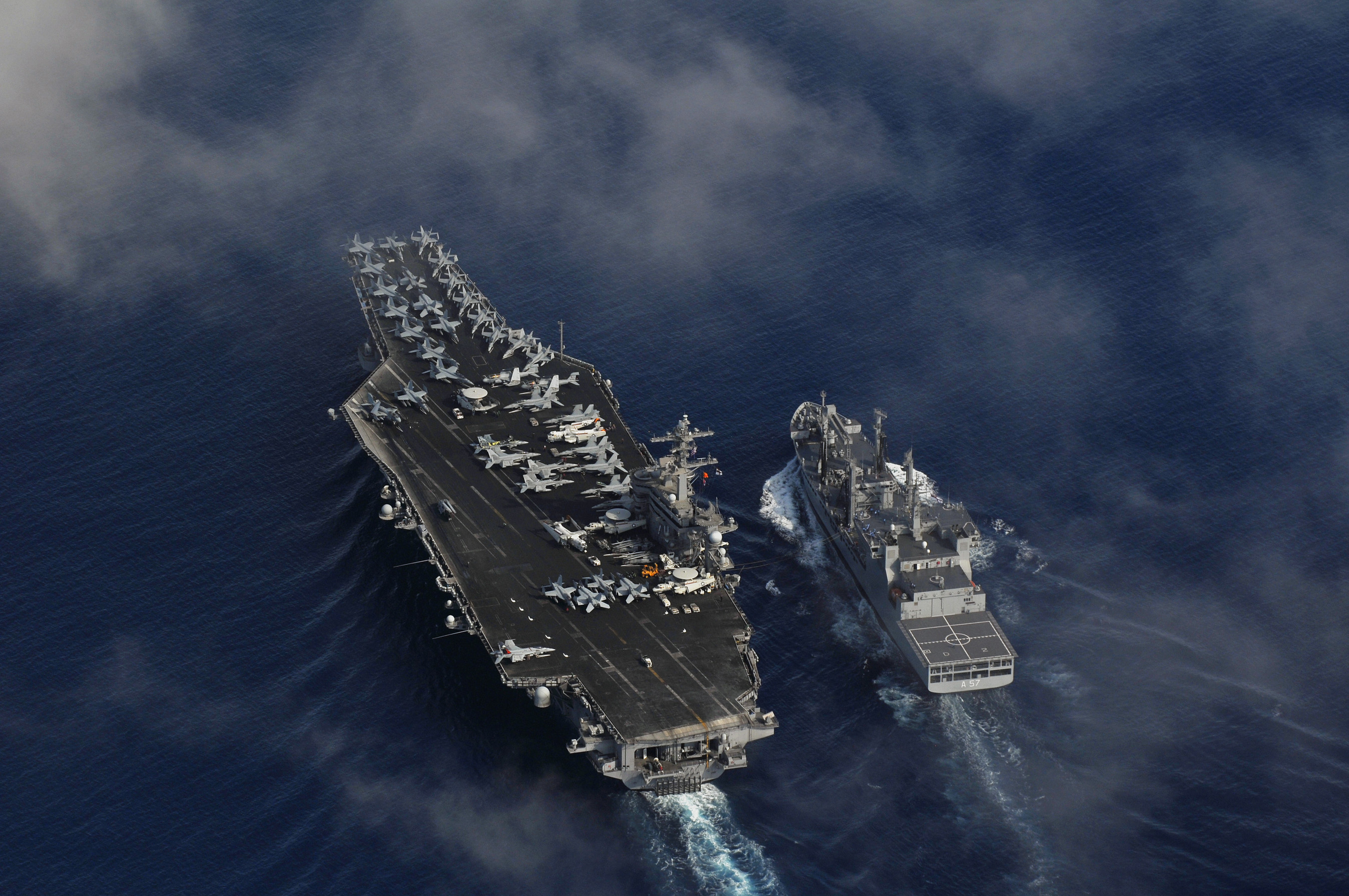
INS Shakti replenishing USS Carl Vinson during Exercise Malabar 2012.

=== 2012 ===
==== Malabar 2012 ====
In April 2012, Shakti took part in the Indian Navy's annual maritime exercise with the US Navy, Malabar 2012, in the Bay of Bengal. During these exercises, the ship replenished USS Carl Vinson, the flagship of the US Navy's Carrier Strike Group 1.

==== South China Sea and the North-West Pacific ====
In May 2012, Shakti, as part of a battle group of four ships, began a sustained operational deployment to the South China Sea and the North West Pacific Ocean. The other three ships were INS Rana, a Rajput-class guided missile destroyer, INS Shivalik, a stealth frigate, and INS Karmuk, a Kora-class corvette. This battle group was under the command of Rear Admiral P Ajit Kumar, Flag Officer Commanding Eastern Fleet. According to the Ministry of Defence, the two-month deployment, far from India's usual area of operations, along with naval exercises with a number of countries, aimed to demonstrate the Indian Navy's operational reach.

During the deployment, the battle group participated in passage exercises with the navies of the countries visited. The passage exercises focused on maritime security cooperation, which included humanitarian aid and disaster relief (HADR) operations and Visit, Board, Search and Seizure (VBSS) drills for anti-piracy operations. These exercises aimed to increase naval inter-operability, enabling the two navies to function with enhanced coordination during possible HADR operations. In addition, during the port visits, the fleet commander along with the commanding officers of the ships met high-ranking officials of the navy, state administration, port management, coastal security organisation, police, and other stakeholders of maritime security in the countries visited, to share professional experiences and exchange best practices in areas of mutual interest.

==== JIMEX 2012 ====
The ship was deployed in the Northwest Pacific for JIMEX 2012 (Japan-India Maritime Exercise) with the four ship group, and took part in India's first bi-lateral maritime exercise with Japan. The Japanese Maritime Self-Defence Force (JMSDF) was represented by two destroyers, one maritime patrol aircraft and a helicopter.

The four ships paused at Tokyo on 5 June 2012 after visiting Singapore, Vietnam, Philippines and South Korea. The flotilla stayed in Tokyo for three days. This visit coincided with the commemoration of 60 years of diplomatic relations between India and Japan. Vice Admiral Anil Chopra, Flag Officer Commanding-in-Chief Eastern Naval Command also visited Tokyo to witness the first JIMEX.

==== South-east Asia ====
After the deployment in the North Pacific, the battle group was deployed in the South China Sea. As part of India's Look East policy, the ships visited Shanghai Port on 13 June 2012, for a five-day goodwill tour. Shakti served as the fuel and logistics tanker for the three destroyers in her group. The ships left the port on 17 June 2012, after having conducted routine passage exercises with the People's Liberation Army Navy.

After the visits to Singapore, Vietnam, Philippines, Japan, South Korea and China, the ships visited Port Klang, Malaysia. This was the last port call of the battle group, after which it returned to the Eastern Fleet of the Indian Navy, after being on a two-month-long deployment which started in May 2012.

=== 2013 ===
==== TROPEX 2013 ====
Shakti was part of a seven-ship fleet which represented Eastern Naval Command at the Indian Navy's annual TROPEX exercise which concluded on 1 March 2013. TROPEX 2013 was a month-long theatre level exercise which was conducted off India's west coast. The navy conducted manoeuvres, weapon fire drills and tactical evaluations.

The other ships in the flotilla were the destroyer Rana, amphibious dock INS Jalashwa, corvettes INS Kulish, Karmuk and INS Sukanya. The flotilla was led by the INS Ranvijay under the command of Admiral Ajith Kumar P, Flag Officer Commanding Eastern Fleet. This flotilla made a port call at Kochi on 4 March 2013, en route to its forward deployment.

==== South China Sea and Western Pacific ====
The ship was part of a four-vessel fleet on a regular operational deployment to the South China Sea and the Western Pacific during May–June 2013, after departure from India on 20 May 2013. The fleet led by Rear Admiral Ajit Kumar consisted of the stealth frigate INS Satpura, Rajput-class destroyer INS Ranvijay, corvette INS Kirch and Shakti, and carried more than 800 crew members combined. Shakti, along with Ranvijay sailed from Port Blair, Andaman and Nicobar Islands, on 21 May. They were joined by Satpura and Kirch, which arrived from Singapore after participating in a maritime exhibition and a bilateral naval exercise. The ships made a five-day port call at Malaysia's Port Klang on 25 May 2013.

The ships conducted passage exercises and practiced both conventional wartime drills and cooperative military action against unconventional sea threats with the Royal Malaysian Navy. They made further port calls at Da Nang, Vietnam and Manila, the Philippines. They returned to India by the end of June 2013. The fleet was deployed in the South China Sea and the Western Pacific from mid-May to end June to reinforce military ties with ASEAN countries, in addition to showcasing India's naval capabilities.

=== 2014 ===
==== Western Pacific ====
In July 2014, an Indian Navy task force consisting of Ranvijay, Shivalik, and Shakti visited the Russian Pacific Fleet at Vladivostok for the Indra-2014 exercises. The Russian fleet consisted of the guided-missile cruiser Varyag, the flagship of the Pacific Fleet; the destroyer Admiral Vinogradov, the large landing craft Peresvet and several auxiliary ships, naval aircraft and helicopters. The exercise took place from 17 to 19 July in the Peter the Great Gulf in the Sea of Japan. The ships conducted tactical maneuvering, artillery and missile firing drills, as well as helicopter deck-landing drills.

After exercising with the Russian Navy, the task force moved to the Pacific Ocean to exercise with the Japanese and the US Navy during Malabar 2014. A carrier group centered on the aircraft carrier USS George Washington, and a nuclear submarine, two destroyers and one tanker represented the US Navy. The JMSDF was represented by two destroyers, the Kurama and Ashigara, and US-2 amphibious warfare aircraft. The harbour phase of the drills was conducted in Sasebo, Japan. Some exercises carried out were maritime patrol, underway replenishment and liaison officer exchange and boarding.

==== Bay of Bengal ====
The naval ships Ranjit, Shivalik, Shakti and INS Airavat were deployed by Eastern Command to transport personnel and relief material as part of the rescue and relief mission during Cyclone Hudhud, which made first landfall near Visakhapatnam.

=== 2015 ===
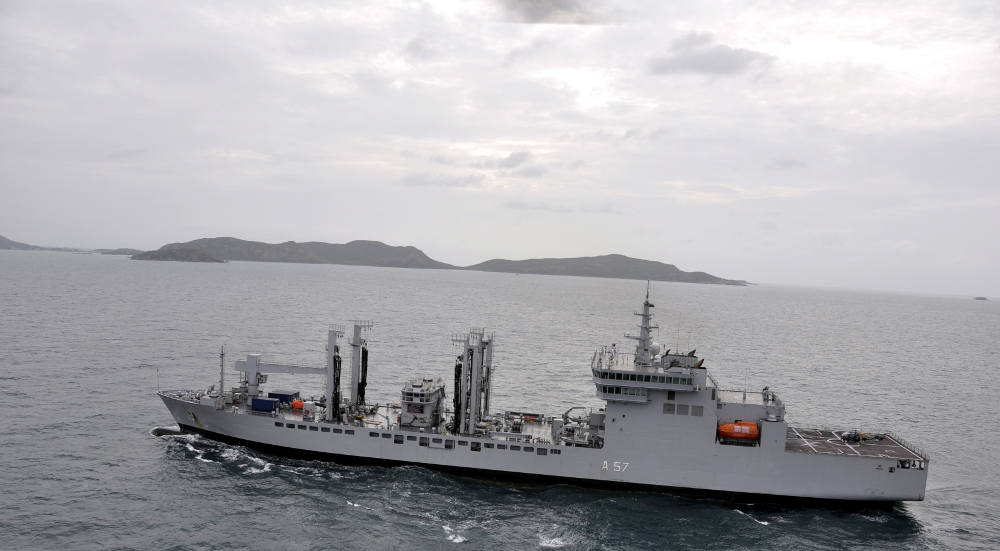
Shakti entering Sattahip harbour in Thailand on 23 June 2015.

Shakti deployed with other ships of the Eastern Fleet to the Andaman & Nicobar Command, to exercise in the Andaman Sea and then deployed overseas to exercise with other navies of the region from Indonesia, Malaysia, Singapore, Cambodia, Thailand and Australia, as part of India's Act East policy. This task force sailed under the command of Flag Officer Commanding Eastern Fleet (FOCEF), Rear Admiral Ajendra Bahadur Singh, who commanded from Satpura. The other ships in the task force were INS Sahyadri, the then-newly commissioned anti-submarine corvette INS Kamorta, the destroyers INS Ranvir and INS Ranvijay and missile corvette INS Khukri. The ships made port calls at Jakarta (Indonesia), Fremantle (Australia), Kuantan (Malaysia), Sattahip (Thailand) and Sihanoukville (Cambodia). They exercised for four days with the Singaporean frigate RSS Supreme and submarine RSS Archer along with the fighters, patrol aircraft and helicopters of the Singaporean Navy from 24–27 May as part of the SIMBEX 2015 exercise.

From 11 to 19 September, the Shakti participated in the inaugural edition of the AUSINDEX exercise between the Indian and Royal Australian Navy. The exercise, held off Visakhaptnam, saw participation from the Royal Australian Navy's tanker HMAS Sirius, frigate HMAS Arunta and submarine HMAS Sheean, complemented by P3C Orion aircraft. The Indian Navy was represented by the ships Shivalik and Ranvijay, complemented by P8I patrol aircraft.

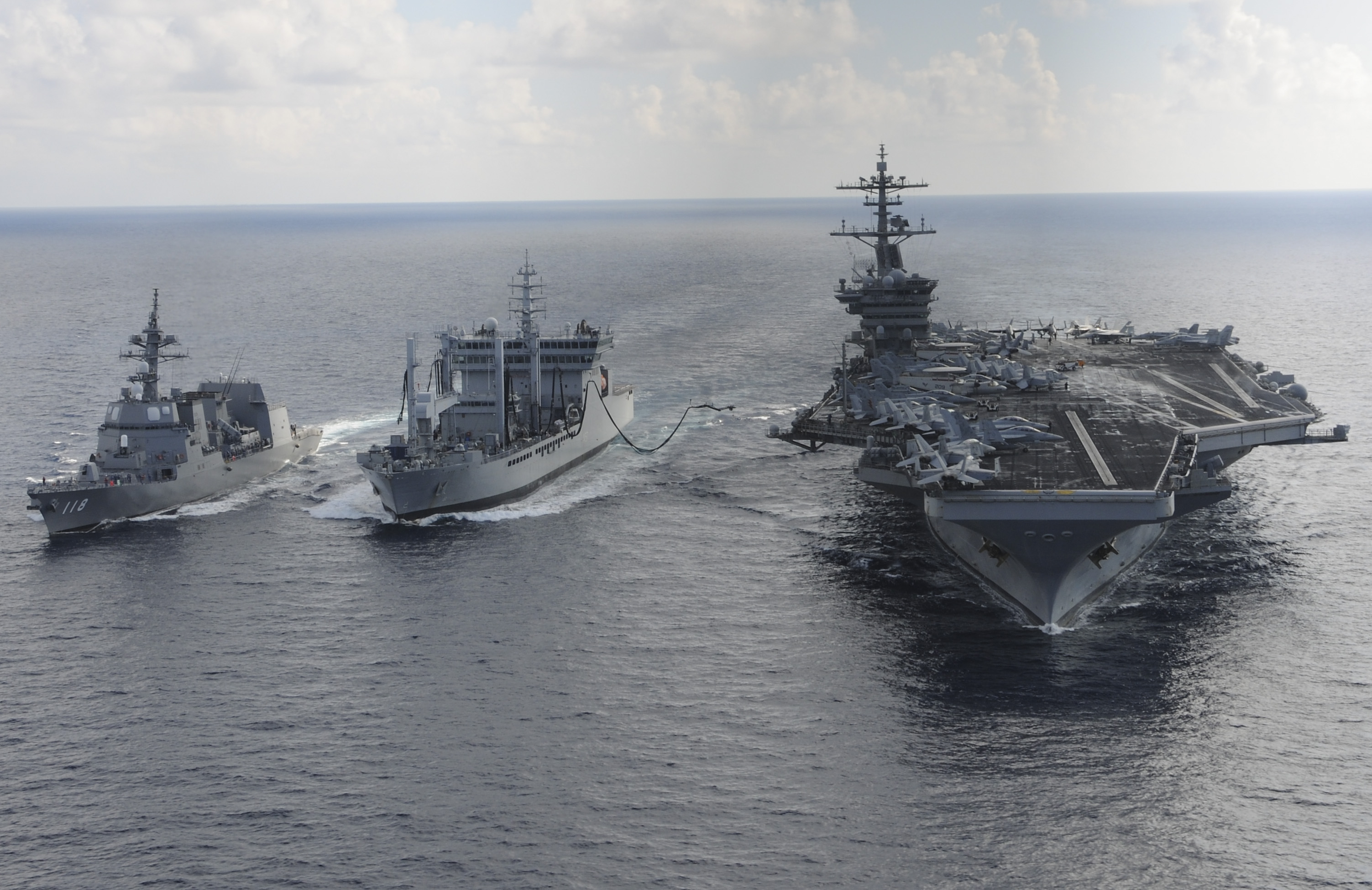
USS Theodore Roosevelt (right) and JS Fuyuzuki (left) being refuelled by Shakti (centre) during the Malabar 2015 exercise

On 16 October, the Malabar 2015 exercise began. The ships Shakti, Ranvijay and Shivalik, along with the frigate INS Betwa and the submarine INS Sindhughosh represented the Indian Navy. The JMSDF was represented by the destroyer JS Fuyuzuki. The US Navy was represented by Carrier Strike Group 12, who dispatched the aircraft carrier USS Theodore Roosevelt with Carrier Air Wing 1, the cruiser USS Normandy, littoral combat ship USS Fort Worth and the nuclear attack submarine USS City of Corpus Christi. The exercises carried out included search and rescue, anti-submarine warfare and war-at-sea drills.

=== 2016 ===
Shakti was part of the 71-ship strong Indian fleet at the International Fleet Review 2016 held at Visakhapatnam from 4 to 8 February.

Starting from 18 May, Shakti along with Satpura, Sahyadri and Kirch were deployed to the South China Sea and North West Pacific for a 2.5-month long deployment. The ships made port calls at Cam Ranh Bay (Vietnam), Subic Bay (Philippines), Sasebo (Japan), Busan (South Korea), Vladivostok (Russia) and Port Klang (Malaysia).

The ships then participated in the Malabar 2016 exercise, whose harbour phase was at Sasebo from 10 to 13 June, and the sea phase was in the Pacific Ocean from 14 to 17 June. The Indian ships also fielded one Sea King 42B ASW and two HAL Chetak helicopters. The JMSDF was represented by JS Hyūga, a helicopter carrier with SH-60 K helicopters and long range maritime patrol aircraft on board. The US Navy was represented by the aircraft carrier USS John C. Stennis with Carrier Air Wing 9, the cruiser USS Mobile Bay, the destroyers USS Stockdale, USS William P. Lawrence and USS Chung-Hoon, a P-8A Poseidon aircraft and an unnamed Los Angeles-class fast attack submarine. The exercises carried out include submarine familiarization, high value target drills, maneuvers and medical emergency drills.

On 21 June, Shakti, Sahyadri and Kirch arrived at Busan, without Satpura, for a four-day visit under the command of the FOCEF, Rear Admiral SV Bhokare. The three ships conducted exercises with ships from the Republic of Korea Navy. The Indian naval group, without Satpura, arrived at Vladivostok on 27 June for a four day unofficial visit.

=== 2018 ===
Shakti and Kamorta made a port call at Makassar in Indonesia under the command of Rear Admiral Dinesh K Tripathi, FOCEF. They were then joined by Sahyadri at Tien Sa port in Da Nang, Vietnam, as part of their two-month long deployment in Southeast Asia and the Northwest Pacific. The ships conducted a joint exercise with the Vietnam Navy, with the harbor phase from 21 to 25 May and the sea phase after.

The three ships sailed to Guam for the 2018 edition of the Malabar exercise. The US Navy was represented by the nuclear-powered aircraft carrier USS Ronald Reagan, the cruisers USS Antietam and USS Chancellorsville, the destroyers USS Benfold and USS Mustin, and an unnamed Los Angeles-class submarine. The JMSDF was represented by the destroyers JS Ise, JS Sazanami, JS Fuyuzuki and an unnamed submarine.

Shakti and the Satpura were joined by the anti-submarine corvette INS Kadmatt at Visakhapatnam for the 2018 edition of the JIMEX exercise held from 7 to 15 October. The JMSDF was represented by the destroyers JS Kaga and JS Inazuma.

On 25 November, Shakti hosted the Tri Service (Eastern Theatre) Commanders' Conference. The commanders on board were FOCEF, Vice Admiral HCS Bisht of the Navy; General Officer Commanding in Chief Eastern Command, Lieutenant General Praveen Bakshi of the Indian Army and Air Officer Commanding in Chief Eastern Air Command, Air Marshal C Hari Kumar of the Indian Air Force. The meet focused on increasing the joint functionality of the three services.

=== 2019 ===
Shakti along with INS Kolkata arrived at Cam Ranh Port, Nha Trang in Vietnam as part of their deployment in Southeast Asia and the South China Sea. The ships with their combined crew of 730 officers and sailors were docked at the port from 13 to 16 April 2019. Bilateral exercises with the Vietnam Navy were conducted during this period.

Shakti and Kolkata then sailed to Qingdao Port on 23 April for an international fleet review as part of the celebrations of the People's Liberation Army Navy's 70th anniversary. The two ships then arrived at Busan Port on 28 April for 3 days to participate in ADMM PLUS, the apex defence meet of ASEAN countries. The two ships then participated in the International Maritime Defence Expo 2019 and the SIMBEX 2019 exercise with Singapore in May.

From 2 to 8 May, Shakti and Kolkata participated in a multilateral group sail in the South China Sea. They were joined by the 7th Fleet of the US Navy, the JMSDF and the Philippine Navy. The destroyers USS William P. Lawrence, JS Izumo, JS Murasame and the patrol ship BRP Andrés Bonifacio sailed with Shakti and Kolkata.

From 16 to 22 May, Shakti participated in the 26th edition of the SIMBEX exercise, along with Kolkata embarked with a Chetak helicopter, and a Sea King aircraft aboard Shakti. The shore phase of the exercise was held at the Changi Naval Base, and the sea phase was held in the South China Sea. The Singaporean Navy was represented by the corvette RSS Valiant, the frigate RSS Steadfast with a S-70B helicopter on board. The Singapore Air Force was represented by four F-16D+ fighter jets and a Fokker 50 maritime patrol aircraft.

=== 2020 ===
Shakti participated in Phase I of the 2020 edition of the Malabar naval exercise. The Australian and Japanese navies also attended the exercise, held in the Bay of Bengal from 3 to 6 November. Shakti refuelled three ships at the same time, namely the destroyers USS John S. McCain and JS Ōnami, as well as the frigate HMAS Ballarat as part of a replenishment at sea exercise. The Indian Navy was also represented by Shivalik, the submarine INS Sindhuraj, patrol vessel Sukanya along with P8I, Dornier and Hawk aircraft; under the command of Rear Admiral Sanjay Vatsayan, FOCEF.

Shakti, along with Sahyadri and Ranvijay, represented the Indian Navy at the 2020 edition of the Indra exercise with Russia. The Russian Navy dispatched the destroyers Admiral Vinogradov and Admiral Tributs, as well as the fleet tanker Boris Butoma from its Pacific Fleet based at Vladivostok.

=== 2021 ===
In 2021, as infections of the COVID-19 pandemic were rising in Sri Lanka, Shakti arrived at Colombo Port with 100 tonnes (98 long tons; 110 short tons) of liquid medical oxygen, which was in short supply in Sri Lanka.

=== 2022 ===
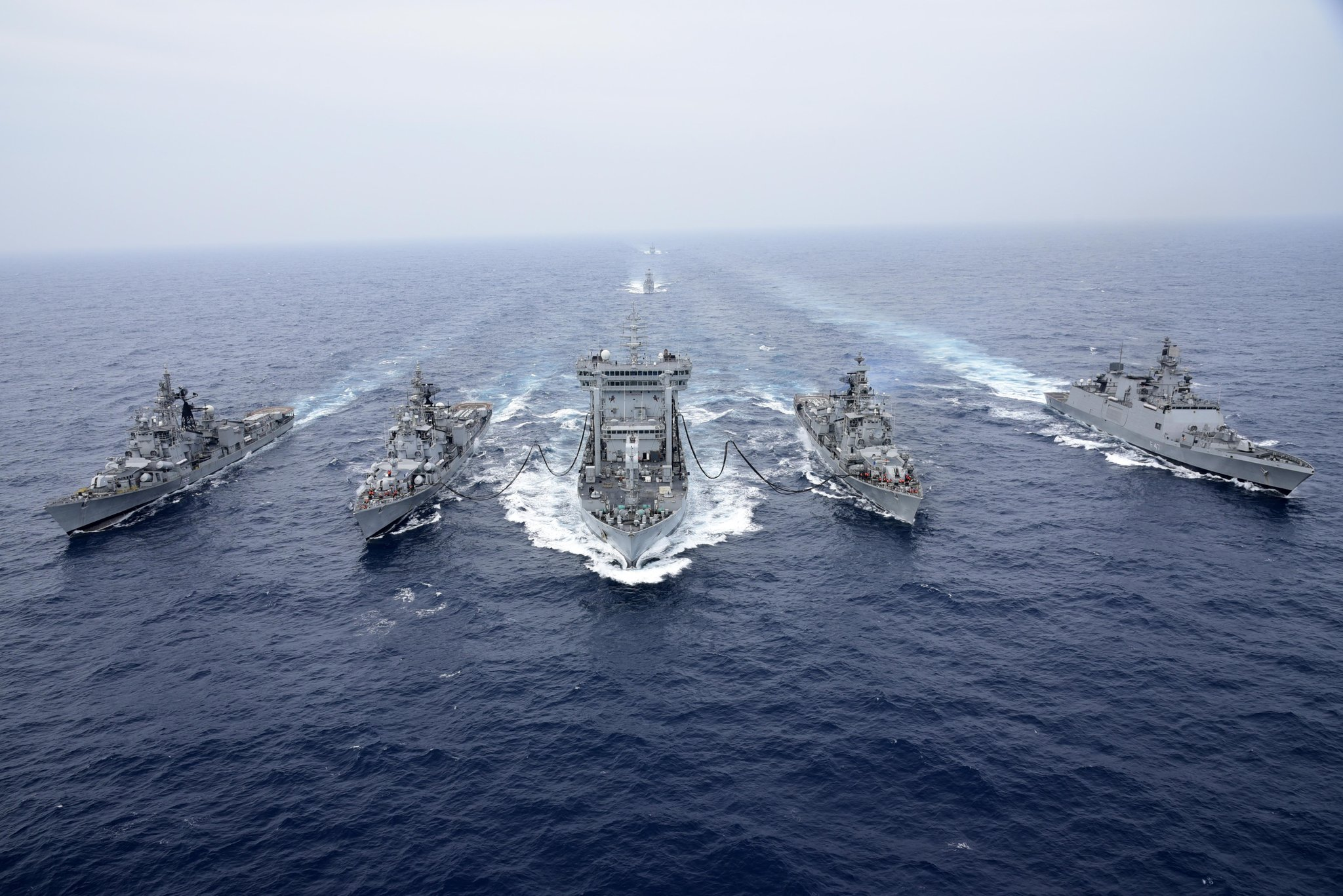
Shakti refuelling two Rajput-class destroyers as part of the celebration of its 11-year anniversary

Shakti participated in the 2022 edition of the Milan naval exercise and refuelled the Australian frigate HMAS Arunta. Navies from 15 nations participated and participated in group exercises simulating the tracking of a stealth submarine, responding to targeted fire from aircraft, among other drills for war at sea.

=== 2023 ===
Shakti and Shivalik, along with the destroyer INS Delhi, represented India at JIMEX 2023, under the command of Rear Admiral Gurcharan Singh, FOCEF. The JMSDF was represented by the destroyer JS Samidare from Escort Flotilla Four.

On 21 October 2023, Shakti along with the Shipping Corporation of India ship Saraswati recovered the 4.5-ton TV-D1 Gaganyaan crew module even as a heavy storm raged in the Bay of Bengal. The test was done to check the execution of a crew module detachment in case of an emergency.

=== 2024 ===
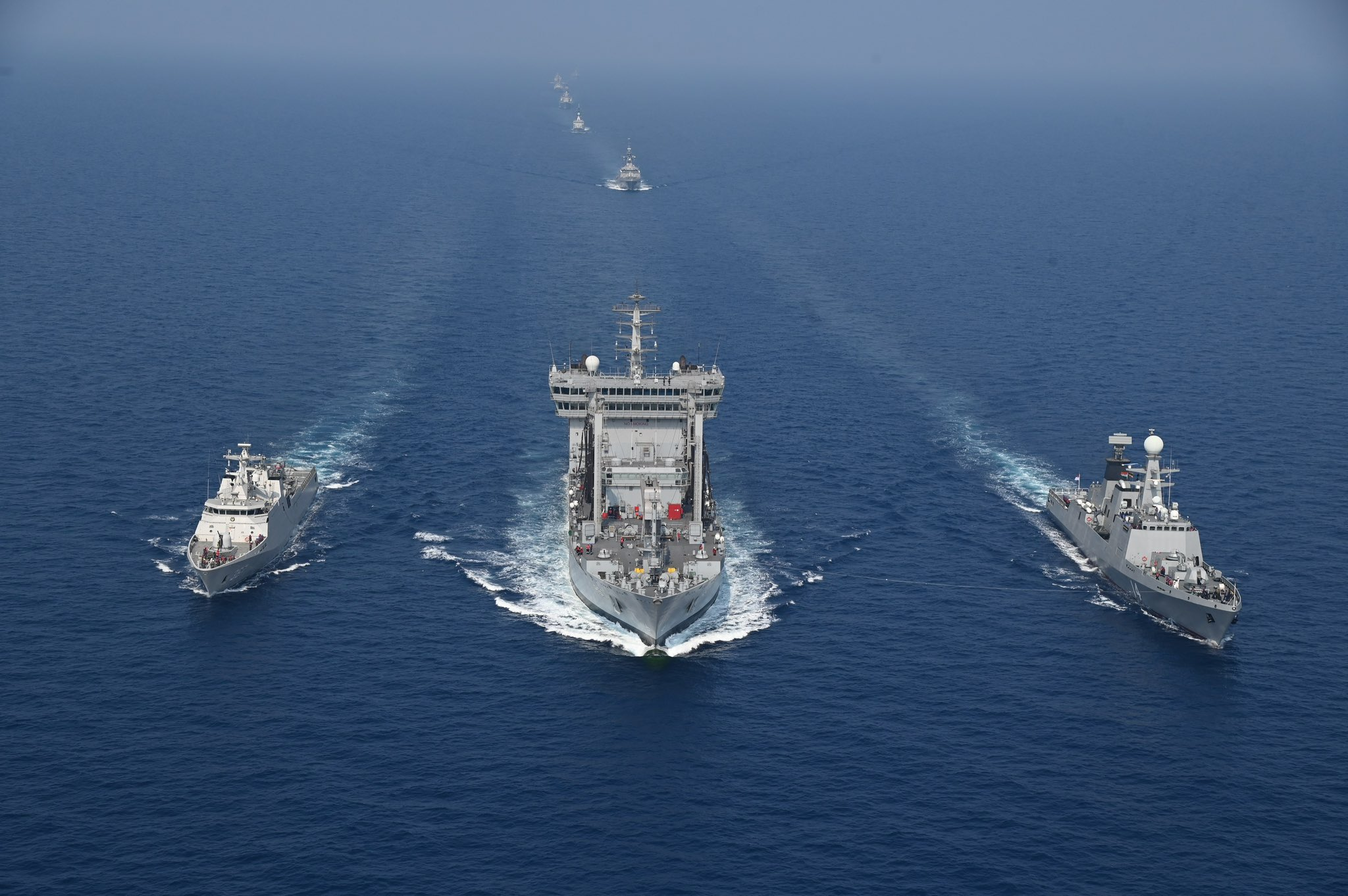
Shakti (centre) with KRI Sultan Iskandar Muda (left) and UMS King Sin Phyu Shin (right) during the Milan 2024 exercise

Shakti participated in the 2024 edition of the Milan naval exercise which took place off the coast of Visakhaptnam from 19 to 27 February. Ships from 50 navies participated; in a rare occurrence, the US, Russian and Iranian Navy all participated in the event despite ongoing tensions.

In May 2024 Shakti along with Delhi and INS Kiltan formed a three-ship flotilla led by Rear Admiral Rajesh Dhankhar, FOCEF. On 6 May the flotilla arrived at Singapore for a three day visit as part of an operational deployment of the Navy's Eastern Fleet to the South China Sea.

Shakti and the Delhi reached Kota Kinabalu in Malaysia on 12 May. The two ships also participated in the Maritime Partnership Exercise with the Royal Malaysian Navy. Officers from both navies participated in subject matter expert exchanges, yoga and sports events, as well as cross deck visits.

On 20 May Shakti, Delhi and Kiltan arrived at Manila under the command of Rear Admiral Dhankhar. During the visit, the Indian and Philippine navies took part in naval exercises and "subject expert matter exchanges, cross deck visits, cultural visits, collaborative community outreach programmes." On 23 May the ships concluded both their visit to Manila and their deployment to the South China Sea.

On 9 October the 2024 edition of the Malabar exercises began in the Bay of Bengal off Visakhapatnam, with navies and special ops forces from all Quad countries participating. The Indian Navy was represented by Shakti, Delhi, INS Tabar, Kadmatt, Kamorta, and P8I aircraft. The Royal Australian Navy was represented by HMAS Stuart, MH-60R Sikorsky helicopters and P8 aircraft. The JMSDF was represented by JS Ariake, while the US Navy was represented by USS Dewey, her onboard helicopters and P8 aircraft. The harbour phase was held from 8 to 12 October and the sea phase from 13 to 18 October.

The ship participated in Exercise Malabar 2024 which was held from 8 to 18 October.

=== 2025 ===
In July 2025, INS Shakti was again deployed in the South East Asia as part of the four-ship flotilla under the command of Rear admiral Susheel Menon, the FOCEF. The flotilla included INS Delhi (D61), INS Satpura (F48) and INS Kiltan (P30). The flotilla called on Singapore from 16 to 19 July. On 24 July, Delhi, Shakti and Kiltan called on Da Nang Port, Vietnam. The fleet was welcomed by the Vietnam People's Navy. On 1 August, the three ships arrived at Manila Port, Philippines. The ships also conducted the maiden joint sail and naval exercise with Philippine Navy on 3 and 4 August. The ships concluded their port call to Manila on 5 August.

=== 2026 ===
INS Shakti participated at the International Fleet Review 2026 held at Visakapatanam.

In late June 2026, Shakti joined the flotilla consisting of INS Udaygiri (F35) and INS Kavaratti (P31) during the operational deployment of the Eastern Fleet to the South East Asia region. The flotilla is being commanded by the Flag Officer Commanding Eastern Fleet (FOCEF), Rear Admiral Alok Ananda. The three ships conducted a port call at the Sattahip Naval Base, Thailand from 27 to 29 June. The flotilla conducted their third port call at the Changi Naval Base, Singapore from 1 July.

== See also ==
- INS Aditya, an Aditya-class tanker
- INS Jyoti, a Komandarm Fedko-class tanker
