= Soni (name) =

Notable people bearing the name Soni include:

== Last name ==
- Ambika Soni (born 1942), Indian politician
- Anup Soni (born 1965), Indian actor and anchor
- Bimal Soni, Indian former cricket team manager
- Hešeri Sonin, one of four regents for the Kangxi Emperor of the Qing dynasty in 1660s China
- Jay Soni (born 1986), Indian actor and host
- Jayshree Soni (born 1990), Indian actress
- Jitu Soni (born 1969), Tanzanian politician
- Kanishka Soni (born 1987), Indian actress and model
- Karan Soni (born 1989), Indian-American actor and comedian
- Kévin Soni (born 1998), Cameroonian professional footballer
- Naveen Soni, Indian anchor, business and financial journalists
- Om Parkash Soni (born 1957), Indian politician
- Rebecca Soni (born 1987), American former competition swimmer, six-time Olympic medalist
- Samir Soni (born 1968), Indian actor and film director
- Satish Soni, retired Indian Navy officer
- Shantilal Soni (1930–2004), Indian film director, producer, writer

== First name ==
- Soni Chaurasia (born 1983), Kathak dancer
- Soni Malaj (born 1981), Albanian singer-songwriter
- Soni Methu (1985–2019), Kenyan journalist
- Soni Pabla (1976–2006), Indian-born Canadian musician
- Soni Razdan, British actress
- Soni Singh, Indian television actress
- Soni Sori, Indian activist
- Soni Wolf (1948–2018), American activist
