= Vishal Bishnoi =

Indian Navy Admiral

- Military career
- Allegiance: India
- Branch: Indian Navy
- Service years: 1994 – present
- Rank: Rear Admiral
- Commands: Eastern Fleet; INS Vikramaditya (R33); INS Dega; INS Trikand (F51); INAS 300; INS Gharial (L23)

Rear Admiral Vishal Bishnoi is a serving Flag officer in the Indian Navy. He currently serves as the Flag Officer Commanding Eastern Fleet. He earlier commanded the aircraft carrier INS Vikramaditya (R33).

== Naval career ==
Bishnoi attended the National Defence Academy, Khadakwasla and was commissioned into the Indian Navy on 1 July 1994. He trained as a naval aviator and joined the INAS 300 (White Tigers) as a fighter pilot. In May 1999, as a Lieutenant, while on an attachment with the Indian Air Force, Bishnoi was flying a MiG-21 U aircraft which caught fire. He ejected from the burning aircraft and landed safely in the grounds of a college.

Bishnoi's first command was the Magar-class amphibious warfare vessel INS Gharial (L23). He attended the Defence Services Staff College, Wellington. He also commanded his squadron, the INAS 300 White Tigers, in the rank of Commander.

As a captain, Bishnoi commanded the Talwar-class stealth guided missile frigate INS Trikand (F51). The ship took part in the inaugural edition of the Bilateral Maritime Exercise Za’ir-Al-Bahr (Roar of the Sea) in November 2019. He also attended the Higher Air Command Course at the College of Air Warfare, Secunderabad. Promoted to the rank of commodore, he took command of the naval air station INS Dega in Visakhapatnam. After around two years in command of Dega, Bishnoi was appointed Commanding Officer of the aircraft carrier INS Vikramaditya (R33). He took command of the carrier from Captain Susheel Menon on 6 May 2023.

=== Flag rank ===
Bishnoi was promoted to flag rank and appointed Assistant Controller Carrier Projects (ACCP) and Assistant Controller of Warship Production and Acquisition (ACWP&A). On 24 July 2026, he took command of the Eastern Fleet as the Flag Officer Commanding Eastern Fleet from Rear Admiral Alok Ananda.

== Awards and decorations ==

Samanya Seva Medal	Special Service Medal	Operation Parakram Medal	Sainya Seva Medal
75th Independence Anniversary Medal	50th Independence Anniversary Medal		30 Years Long Service Medal
	20 Years Long Service Medal	9 Years Long Service Medal	

Military offices
Preceded by Susheel Menon	Commanding officer INS Vikramaditya; 2023 – 2024	Succeeded by Sundeep Singh Randhawa
Preceded by Alok Ananda	Flag Officer Commanding Eastern Fleet; 2026 – Present	Incumbent
