= Tarun Sobti =

Indian Navy Admiral

Vice Admiral Tarun Sobti UYSM, AVSM, VSM
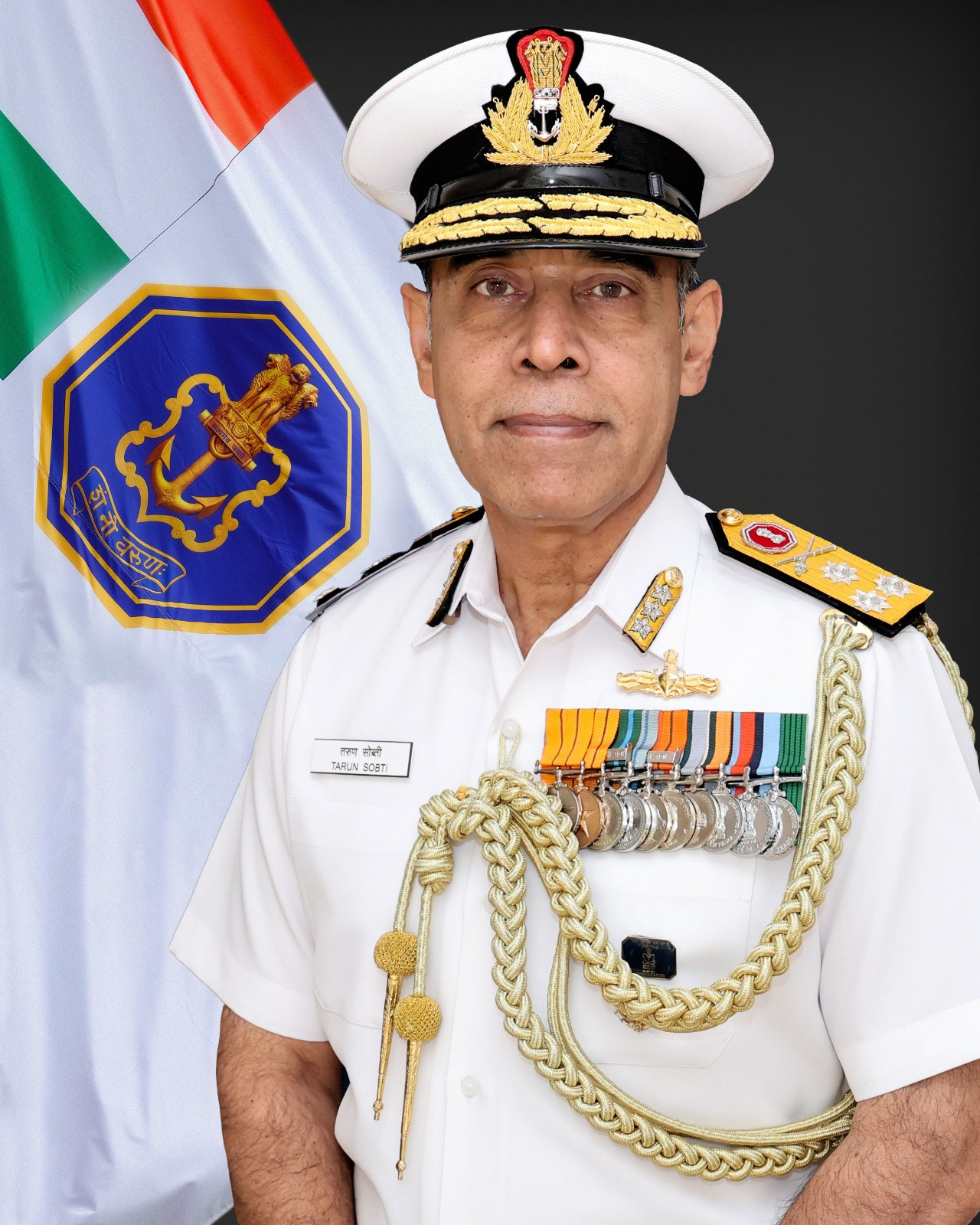
- Education: Indian Naval Academy
- Military career
- Allegiance: India
- Branch: Indian Navy
- Service years: July 1988 - July 2026
- Rank: Vice Admiral
- Service number: 03350-N
- Commands: Deputy Chief of the Naval Staff; Project Seabird; Eastern Fleet; INS Kolkata (D63); INS Kora (P61); INS Nishank (K43)
- Awards: Ati Vishisht Seva Medal; Vishisht Seva Medal

Vice Admiral Tarun Sobti, UYSM, AVSM, VSM is a former flag officer in the Indian Navy. He last served as the Deputy Chief of the Naval Staff. His other flag appointments were Director General Project Seabird, Flag Officer Commanding Eastern Fleet and Deputy Commandant and Chief Instructor at the Indian Naval Academy. He was the commissioning commanding Officer of the Kolkata-class guided missile destroyer INS Kolkata (D63).

== Early life and education ==
Sobti was born in an army family. His father was a general officer in the Indian Army, retiring as a major general. His mother was a teacher and his elder brother also joined the Army, retiring in 2017.

Sobti attended the Delhi Public School, Mathura Road. After his schooling, he joined and graduated from the National Defence Academy, Pune in 1986. He was awarded the President's Gold Medal, for standing first in overall order of merit.

== Naval career ==
Sobti was commissioned into the Indian Navy on 1 July 1988. He is a specialist in Navigation and direction. During the specialisation course, he stood first and was adjudged the Best all-round trainee. He attended the Collège Interarmées de Défense in Paris and the College of Naval Warfare (CNW) in Mumbai. During the Naval Higher Command Course at the CNW, he was awarded the CNS Gold Medal for Best Op Paper.

He has served as the navigating officer of the Khukri-class corvette INS Kirpan (P44) and was part of the commissioning crew of the Delhi-class Guided missile destroyer INS Mysore (D60) as its navigating officer. He later served as the direction officer of the aircraft carrier INS Viraat (R22) and the executive officer of the guided missile destroyer INS Delhi (D61).

Sobti has commanded the Veer-class missile vessel INS Nishank (K43), and the lead ship of the Kora-class corvette INS Kora (P61). In August 2014, the lead ship of the indigenously-built Kolkata-class Guided missile destroyers INS Kolkata (D63) was commissioned by the Prime Minister Narendra Modi in Mumbai. Sobti was the commissioning commanding officer of the ship.

Sobti, in his staff appointments, has served as the joint director of staff requirements and joint director of personnel at Naval headquarters. He also served as the Captain Work-Up at Local Work-Up Team (East). The LWT (East) is under the operational control of Flag Officer Sea Training and administrative control of the Flag Officer Commanding-in-Chief Eastern Naval Command. As a commodore, he served as the naval attaché at the Embassy of India in Moscow.

=== Flag rank ===
On promotion to Flag Rank, in March 2019, Sobti took over as the deputy commandant and chief instructor at the Indian Naval Academy, Ezhimala. After a 21-month stint as deputy commandant, he handed over to Rear Admiral A. N. Pramod in January 2021. For this stint, Sobti was awarded the Vishisht Seva Medal on 26 January 2020. On 23 February 2021, he assumed the office of the Flag Officer Commanding Eastern Fleet, taking over from Rear Admiral Sanjay Vatsayan who commanded the fleet from 2020 to 2021.

Under his command, the Eastern Fleet, executed Operation Samudra Setu II and Operation Sagar. These operations were aimed at the transfer of medical oxygen and provided humanitarian assistance to friendly foreign countries respectively. The fleet also participated in the maritime exercise Malabar 21 in Western Pacific off Guam. For his command of the Eastern fleet, he was awarded the Ati Vishisht Seva Medal on 26 January 2022.

On promotion to the rank of vice admiral, on 24 December 2021, Sobti took over as the director general Project Seabird, from Vice Admiral Puneet Kumar Bahl. He was succeeded by Vice Admiral Rajesh Dhankhar as the DG of the project. On 1 October 2023, Sobti was appointed deputy chief of the naval staff and took over Vice Admiral Sanjay Mahindru who retired. He served as the DCNS during Operation Sindoor, for which he was awarded the Uttam Yudh Seva Medal.

== Awards and decorations ==

Uttam Yudh Seva Medal	Ati Vishisht Seva Medal	Vishisht Seva Medal	Samanya Seva Medal
Operation Vijay Medal	Sainya Seva Medal	75th Anniversary of Independence Medal	50th Anniversary of Independence Medal
30 Years Long Service Medal	20 Years Long Service Medal		9 Years Long Service Medal

== Personal life ==
Sobti is married to Shagun Sobti, a teacher. The couple have a daughter, Mallika.

== See also ==
- Flag Officer Commanding Eastern Fleet
- Eastern Fleet

== Bibliography ==
- Hiranandani, G.M. (2001), Transition to Guardianship: The Indian Navy 1991-2000, Lancer Publishers, ISBN 9781935501268

Military offices
Preceded by Puneet Chadha	Deputy Commandant Indian Naval Academy; 2019 - 2021	Succeeded by A. N. Pramod
Preceded by Sanjay Vatsayan	Flag Officer Commanding Eastern Fleet; February 2021 - December 2021	Succeeded by Sanjay Bhalla
Preceded by Puneet Kumar Bahl	Director General Project Seabird; December 2021 - September 2023	Succeeded by Rajesh Dhankhar
Preceded by Sanjay Mahindru	Deputy Chief of the Naval Staff; October 2023 - July 2026	Succeeded by A. N. Pramod
