= Chaurasiya =

Chaurasiya, or Chaurasia (Hindi: चौरसिया), is an Indian surname.

== Notable people ==
People who bear this surname include:

- Ajaya Kumar Chaurasiya, Nepalese politician
- Alok Kumar Chaurasiya, Indian politician
- Rameshwar Chaurasiya, Indian politician
- Sanjeev Chaurasiya, Indian politician
- Deepak Chaurasia, Indian journalist
- Hariprasad Chaurasia, Indian music director and flautist
- Rakesh Chaurasia, Indian flautist
- Ganga Prasad Chaurasia, Indian politician, Governor of Sikkim
- Soni Chaurasia, Indian dancer
