= Sanjay Bhalla =

Indian Navy Admiral

Vice Admiral Sanjay Bhalla AVSM NM
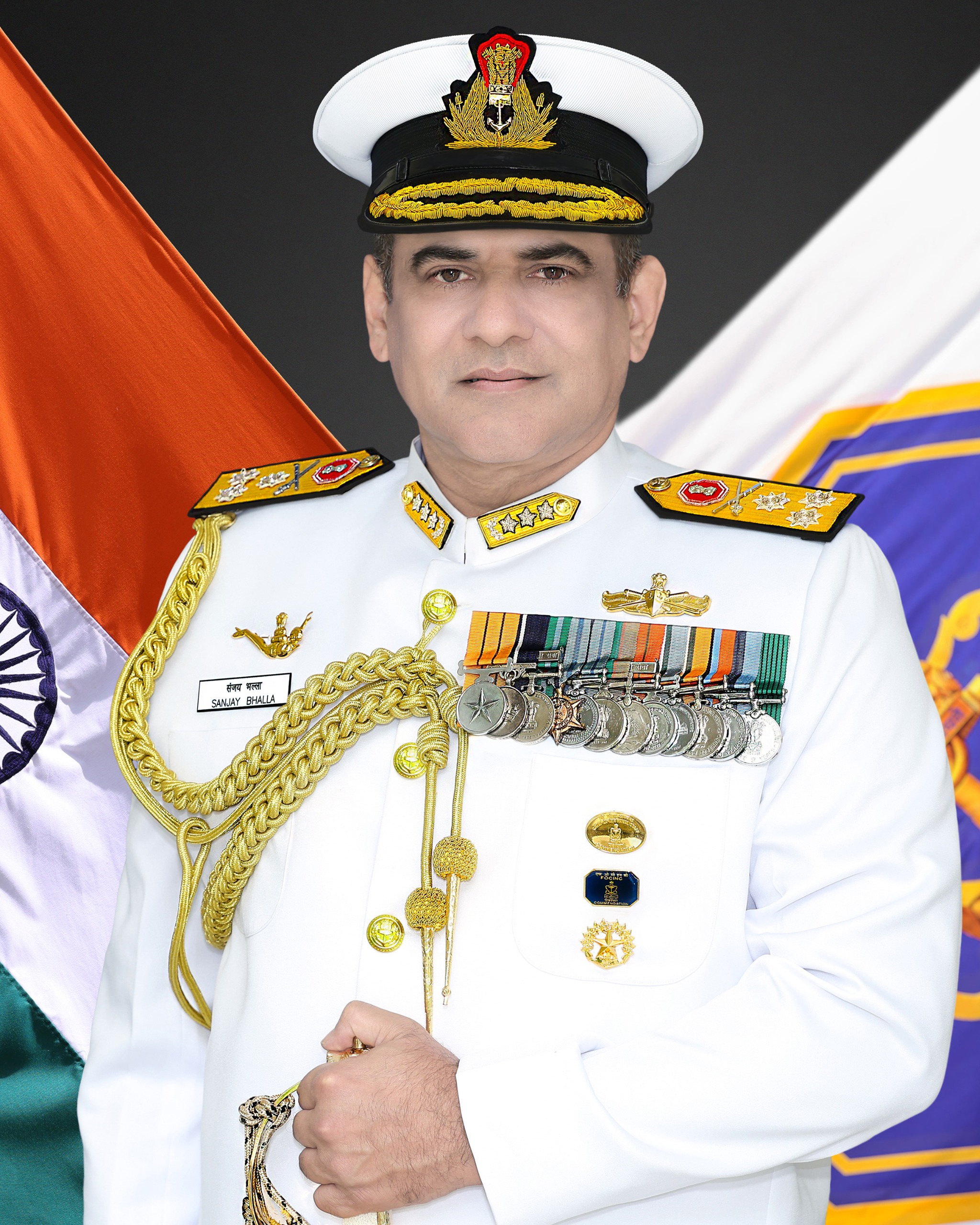
- Official portrait, 2025

Flag Officer Commanding-in-Chief Eastern Naval Command
- Incumbent
- Assumed office 31 October 2025
- Chief of Naval Staff: Dinesh Kumar Tripathi; Krishna Swaminathan
- Preceded by: Rajesh Pendharkar

Personal details
- Born: Chandigarh, India

Military service
- Allegiance: India
- Branch/service: Indian Navy
- Years of service: 1 January 1989 - present
- Rank: Vice Admiral
- Commands: Eastern Naval Command; Eastern Fleet; INS Beas (2000); INS Taragiri (F41); INS Nishank (K43)
- Service Number: 03371-K
- Awards: Ati Vishisht Seva Medal; Nao Sena Medal

Vice Admiral Sanjay Bhalla, AVSM, NM is a serving flag officer in the Indian Navy. He currently serves as Flag Officer Commanding-in-Chief, Eastern Naval Command. He earlier served as the Chief of Personnel and as the Flag Officer Commanding Eastern Fleet.

== Early life and education ==
He is an alumnus of Guru Nanak Public School, Chandigarh and Government Post Graduate College, Sector 11, Chandigarh. He is also an alumnus of the Defence Services Staff College, Wellington, the Naval War College, Goa and the Royal College of Defence Studies, London. The flag officer holds a MPhil degree in Defence and Strategic Studies, Masters in International Security and Strategic Studies from the King's College, London and MSc (Telecom) from CUSAT.

== Naval career ==
Bhalla was commissioned into the Indian Navy on 1 January 1989. He is a specialist in Communication and Electronic Warfare, along with being a Clearance Naval Diver, graduating from Diving School, Kochi .Bhalla has commanded the Veer-class missile vessel INS Nishank (K43), and the Nilgiri-class anti-submarine warfare frigate INS Taragiri (F41). He subsequently commanded the Brahmaputra-class guided-missile frigate INS Beas (2000).

Bhalla, in his staff appointments, has served as the training commander at the Indian Naval Academy. He also served as the Director at Maritime Doctrine and Concepts Centre. As a Captain, he served as the Naval adviser at the High Commission of India, Islamabad. As a Commodore, he served as the Naval assistant to the Chief of the Naval Staff.

=== Flag rank ===
On promotion to Flag Rank, Bhalla took over as the Assistant Chief of Personnel (Human Resource Development) (ACOP HRD) at naval headquarters. ACOP is an assistant principal staff officer appointment. On 20 December 2021, he assumed the office of the Flag Officer Commanding Eastern Fleet (FOCEF), taking over from Rear Admiral Tarun Sobti who commanded the Eastern Fleet from February to December 2021. On 26 January 2022, he was awarded the Nao Sena Medal for devotion to duty. As FOCEF, he was the officer in tactical command during the President's fleet review (PFR) held in February 2022.

On 1 April 2023, he was promoted to the rank of Vice Admiral and appointed Chief of Staff, Western Naval Command, taking over Vice Admiral Krishna Swaminathan. On 26 January 2024, he was awarded the Ati Vishisht Seva Medal. On 10 May 2024, he took over as the Chief of Personnel. On 31 October 2025, he was appointed the Flag Officer Commanding-in-Chief Eastern Naval Command succeeding Vice Admiral Rajesh Pendharkar.

== Awards and decorations ==
Bhalla was awarded the Nao Sena Medal for devotion to duty in 2022 and the Ati Vishisht Seva Medal in 2024.

Ati Vishisht Seva Medal	Nao Sena Medal	Samanya Seva Medal	Operation Vijay Star
Operation Vijay Medal	Operation Parakram Medal	Sainya Seva Medal	75th Anniversary of Independence Medal
50th Anniversary of Independence Medal	30 Years Long Service Medal	20 Years Long Service Medal	9 Years Long Service Medal

== See also ==
- Flag Officer Commanding Eastern Fleet
- Eastern Fleet

Military offices
Preceded by Tarun Sobti	Flag Officer Commanding Eastern Fleet; 2021 - 2022	Succeeded by Gurcharan Singh
Preceded by Krishna Swaminathan	Chief of Staff, Western Naval Command; 2023 - 2024	Succeeded by Ajay Kochhar
Preceded by Krishna Swaminathan	Chief of Personnel; 2024 - 2025	Succeeded by Gurcharan Singh
Preceded by Rajesh Pendharkar	Flag Officer Commanding-in-Chief Eastern Naval Command; 2025 - Present	Incumbent
