= Sonie =

Sonie is a surname. Notable people with the surname include:

- Bhappi Sonie (1928–2001), Indian film director
- Varmah Sonie (born 1990), American football player

== See also ==
- Soni (name)
