= Flag Officer Commanding Eastern Fleet =

Indian Naval appointment

Flag Officer Commanding Eastern Fleet (FOCEF)
- Flag of the FOCEF (Rear Admiral's flag)
- Incumbent; Rear Admiral Vishal Bishnoi since 24 July 2026
- Indian Navy
- Abbreviation: FOCEF
- Reports to: Flag Officer Commanding-in-Chief Eastern Naval Command
- Seat: Visakhapatnam
- First holder: Rear Admiral S H Sarma, PVSM

Flag Officer Commanding Eastern Fleet (FOCEF) is the title of the Indian Navy Officer who commands the Eastern Fleet, headquartered in Visakhapatnam, Andhra Pradesh. The FOCEF is a Two Star Officer holding the rank of Rear Admiral. The current FOCEF is Rear Admiral Vishal Bishnoi, who assumed office on 24 July 2026.

== History ==
After the independence and the Partition of India on 15 August 1947, the ships and personnel of the Royal Indian Navy were divided between the Dominion of India and the Dominion of Pakistan. The division of the ships was on the basis of two-thirds of the fleet to India, one third to Pakistan.

The operational ships of the remaining Royal Indian Navy, minus Pakistan, were initially placed under the command of the Commodore Commanding Indian Naval Squadron (COMINS), later the Rear-Admiral Commanding Indian Naval Squadron (RACINS), whose title was then changed to Flag Officer (Flotilla) Indian Fleet (FOFIF). These appointments were initially held by British officers: Commodore H.N.S. Brown, who was the Commanding Officer of INS Delhi (C74) and serving as COMINS, seemingly at the same time, and later, Commodore (later Rear Admiral) Geoffrey Barnard who became COMINS and later Rear-Admiral Commanding, INS. The Flotilla was later upgraded to the Indian Fleet under a Flag Officer Commanding Indian Fleet (FOCIF).

On the proclamation of a Republic in 1950, the 'Royal' title was dropped and the Navy became simply the Indian Navy. Barnard was succeeded by Rear Admiral N.V. ("Uncle Richard") Dickinson, Rear Admiral F.A. Ballance, and then the final British officer Rear Admiral St John Tyrwhitt as FOCIF. In 1956, Rear Admiral Ram Dass Katari became the first Indian flag officer, and was appointed the first Indian FOCIF on 2 October, when he took over from Rear Admiral Tyrwhitt. (title alternately given as Flag Officer (Flotilla)). In 1957, INS Mysore (C60) was commissioned, and the flag of Rear Admiral Katari was transferred, INS Mysore thus becoming the flagship of the Indian Fleet.

On 1 March 1968, the Eastern Naval Command was established and the Indian Fleet was renamed as the Western Fleet. In September 1971, Rear Admiral S H Sarma was summoned by the Chief of the Naval Staff, Admiral S M Nanda who told him that he was to move to Visakhapatnam and take up command of the yet-to-be-formed Eastern Fleet. The two-fleet concept of the Navy came into force with the constitution of the Eastern Fleet on 1 November 1971. Rear Admiral Sarma took over as the founding Flag Officer Commanding Eastern Fleet (FOCEF). In mid 1971, The aircraft carrier INS Vikrant, along with the frigates INS Brahmaputra and INS Beas were moved from the Western Fleet to the Eastern Naval Command. Thus, INS Vikrant became the flagship of the Eastern Fleet.

== Organisation ==
The FOCWF is assisted by the fleet staff, headed by the Fleet Operations Officer (FOO), a one-star appointment. The Fleet Communications & Electronic Warfare Officer (FCO), Fleet Gunnery Officer (FGO), Fleet Navigation Officer (FNO), Fleet Anti-Submarine Warfare Officer (FASWO), Fleet Nuclear, Biological and Chemical Damage Control Officer (FNBCDO), Fleet Engineering Officer (FEO) and Fleet Electrical Officer (FLO) make up the rest of the fleet staff.

== List of commanders ==
S.No.	Name	Assumed office	Left office	Notes
1	Rear Admiral S H Sarma PVSM	1 November 1971	1 March 1973	Later Flag Officer Commanding-in-Chief Eastern Naval Command.
2	Rear Admiral Ronald Lynsdale Pereira AVSM	2 March 1973	10 January 1975	Later Chief of the Naval Staff.
3	Rear Admiral R K S Ghandhi VrC	28 January 1975	18 October 1975	Also commanded the Western Fleet. Later Flag Officer Commanding-in-Chief Western Naval Command.
4	Rear Admiral V. E. C. Barboza AVSM & bar	29 October 1975	14 April 1976	Later Flag Officer Commanding-in-Chief Western Naval Command.
5	Rear Admiral D. S. Paintal AVSM	16 April 1976	9 June 1977	
6	Rear Admiral Mihir K. Roy AVSM	10 June 1977	27 February 1978	Director of Naval Intelligence during the Indo-Pakistani War of 1971.
7	Rear Admiral Oscar Stanley Dawson AVSM	28 February 1978	20 March 1979	Later Chief of the Naval Staff.
8	Rear Admiral S. L. Sethi AVSM, NM	21 March 1979	4 January 1980	Later Vice Chief of the Naval Staff.
9	Rear Admiral K. K. Nayyar AVSM	5 January 1980	17 July 1981	Later commanded the Western Fleet and served as Vice Chief of the Naval Staff.
10	Rear Admiral Sukmal Jain AVSM, NM	18 July 1981	14 October 1982	Later Flag Officer Commanding-in-Chief Western Naval Command.
11	Rear Admiral I. J. S. Khurana	15 October 1982	28 June 1983	Later Director General of the Indian Coast Guard.
12	Rear Admiral Laxminarayan Ramdas AVSM, VrC, VSM	29 June 1983	27 March 1985	Later Chief of the Naval Staff.
13	Rear Admiral S. P. Govil AVSM	28 March 1985	7 March 1986	Later Vice Chief of the Naval Staff.
14	Rear Admiral H. Johnson AVSM	8 March 1986	8 July 1987	Later Vice Chief of the Naval Staff.
15	Rear Admiral S. W. Lakhkar AVSM, NM	9 July 1987	22 August 1988	Later Fortress Commander, Andaman and Nicobar Islands and Director General of the Indian Coast Guard.
16	Rear Admiral B. Guha AVSM	23 August 1988	28 January 1990	Later Flag Officer Commanding-in-Chief Eastern Naval Command.
17	Rear Admiral P. S. Das UYSM, AVSM	29 January 1990	26 October 1991	Later Flag Officer Commanding-in-Chief Eastern Naval Command.
18	Rear Admiral Vishnu Bhagwat AVSM	27 October 1991	2 October 1992	Later Chief of the Naval Staff.
19	Rear Admiral P. J. Jacob AVSM, VSM	3 October 1992	2 January 1994	Later Vice Chief of the Naval Staff.
20	Rear Admiral Harinder Singh AVSM	3 January 1994	28 April 1995	Later Flag Officer Commanding-in-Chief Southern Naval Command.
21	Rear Admiral Arun Prakash AVSM, VrC, VSM	29 April 1995	26 November 1996	Later Chief of the Naval Staff.
22	Rear Admiral Om Prakash Bansal AVSM, VSM	27 November 1996	14 October 1997	Later served as Commander-in-Chief, Andaman and Nicobar Command and as Flag Officer Commanding-in-Chief Eastern Naval Command.
23	Rear Admiral S. V. Gopalachari AVSM, VSM	15 October 1997	10 November 1998	Later Deputy Chief of the Naval Staff.
24	Rear Admiral K. V. Bharathan AVSM, VSM	11 November 1998	14 March 2000	Later Vice Chief of the Naval Staff.
25	Rear Admiral Arun Kumar Singh AVSM, NM	15 March 2000	7 October 2001	Later served as Commander-in-Chief, Andaman and Nicobar Command and as Flag Officer Commanding-in-Chief Eastern Naval Command.
26	Rear Admiral Pradeep Kaushiva UYSM, VSM	8 October 2001	26 January 2003	Later Commandant of the National Defence College.
27	Rear Admiral Raman Prem Suthan AVSM, VSM	26 January 2003	29 April 2004	Later Flag Officer Commanding-in-Chief Eastern Naval Command.
28	Rear Admiral S. K. Damle AVSM, NM, VSM	30 April 2004	23 May 2005	Later Flag Officer Commanding-in-Chief Southern Naval Command.
29	Rear Admiral Sanjeev Bhasin AVSM, VSM	24 May 2005	23 March 2006	Later Commandant of the National Defence College and Flag Officer Commanding-in-Chief Western Naval Command.
30	Rear Admiral D. K. Joshi AVSM, YSM, NM, VSM	24 March 2006	15 March 2007	Later Chief of the Naval Staff.
31	Rear Admiral Robin K. Dhowan AVSM, YSM	15 March 2007	24 January 2008	Later Chief of the Naval Staff.
32	Rear Admiral Satish Soni	16 February 2008	26 November 2008	Later Flag Officer Commanding-in-Chief Southern Naval Command and Flag Officer Commanding-in-Chief Eastern Naval Command.
33	Rear Admiral Anurag Thapliyal AVSM, NM	26 November 2008	31 August 2009	Later served as Commandant of Indian Naval Academy and as the Director General of the Indian Coast Guard.
34	Rear Admiral P. N. Murugesan VSM	31 August 2009	24 January 2011	Later served as Vice Chief of the Naval Staff.
35	Rear Admiral Harish Bisht	24 January 2011	30 April 2012	Later Flag Officer Commanding-in-Chief Eastern Naval Command.
36	Rear Admiral Ajit Kumar P	30 April 2012	15 August 2013	Later served as Flag Officer Commanding-in-Chief Western Naval Command.
37	Rear Admiral Atul Kumar Jain VSM	10 July 2013	7 October 2014	Later served as Chief of Integrated Defence Staff.
38	Rear Admiral Ajendra Bahadur Singh VSM	7 October 2014	6 October 2015	Later Flag Officer Commanding-in-Chief Eastern Naval Command and Flag Officer Commanding-in-Chief Western Naval Command.
39	Rear Admiral S. V. Bhokare YSM, NM	12 October 2015	15 October 2016	Later served as Inspector General Nuclear Safety.
40	Rear Admiral Biswajit Dasgupta YSM, VSM	14 October 2016	15 January 2018	Later Flag Officer Commanding-in-Chief Eastern Naval Command.
41	Rear Admiral Dinesh K Tripathi AVSM, NM	15 January 2018	30 March 2019	Later Chief of the Naval Staff.
42	Rear Admiral Suraj Berry AVSM, NM, VSM	30 March 2019	10 February 2020	Later Commander-in-Chief, Strategic Forces Command.
43	Rear Admiral Sanjay Vatsayan NM	10 February 2020	23 February 2021	Current Flag Officer Commanding-in-Chief Western Naval Command.
44	Rear Admiral Tarun Sobti VSM	23 February 2021	20 December 2021	Later Deputy Chief of the Naval Staff.
45	Rear Admiral Sanjay Bhalla NM	20 December 2021	30 November 2022	Current Flag Officer Commanding-in-Chief Eastern Naval Command.
46	Rear Admiral Gurcharan Singh NM	01 December 2022	10 November 2023	Current Chief of Personnel.
47	Rear Admiral Rajesh Dhankhar NM	10 November 2023	21 August 2024	Current Deputy Chief of the Integrated Defence Staff (Doctrine, Organisation & Training).
48	Rear Admiral Susheel Menon VSM	21 August 2024	17 October 2025	Current Chief of Staff, Eastern Naval Command.
49	Rear Admiral Alok Ananda YSM	17 October 2025	23 July 2026	
50	Rear Admiral Vishal Bishnoi	24 July 2026	Present	

== See also ==
- Eastern Fleet
- Flag Officer Commanding Western Fleet
