= Eastern Naval Command =

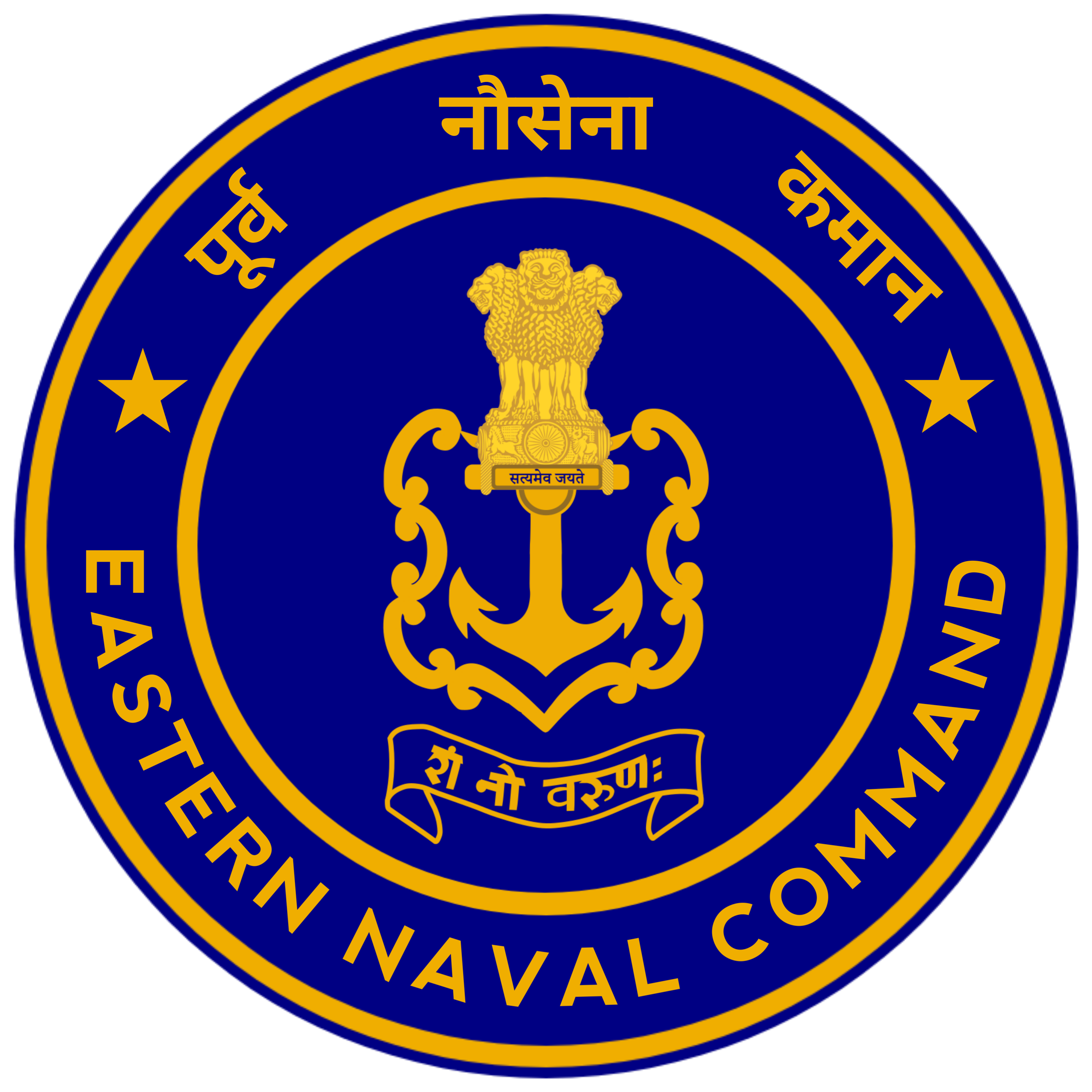
- Crest of the Eastern Naval Command
- Active: 1968
- Country: India
- Branch: Indian Navy
- Type: Command
- Headquarters: Visakhapatnam, Andhra Pradesh

Commanders
- FOC-in-C: Vice Admiral Sanjay Bhalla, AVSM, NM
- Chief of Staff: Vice Admiral Susheel Menon, VSM
- FOCEF: Rear Admiral Alok Ananda, YSM

The Eastern Naval Command is one of the three command-level formations of the Indian Navy. It is headquartered in Visakhapatnam, Andhra Pradesh. The command is responsible for the all naval forces in the Bay of Bengal and parts of the Indian Ocean and the naval establishments on the east coast of India.

The Command was established in 1983. The Command is commanded by a Three Star Flag Officer of the rank of Vice Admiral with the title Flag Officer Commanding-in-Chief Eastern Command (FOC-in-C). Vice Admiral Sanjay Bhalla is the current FOC-in-C ENC, who took over on 31 October 2025.

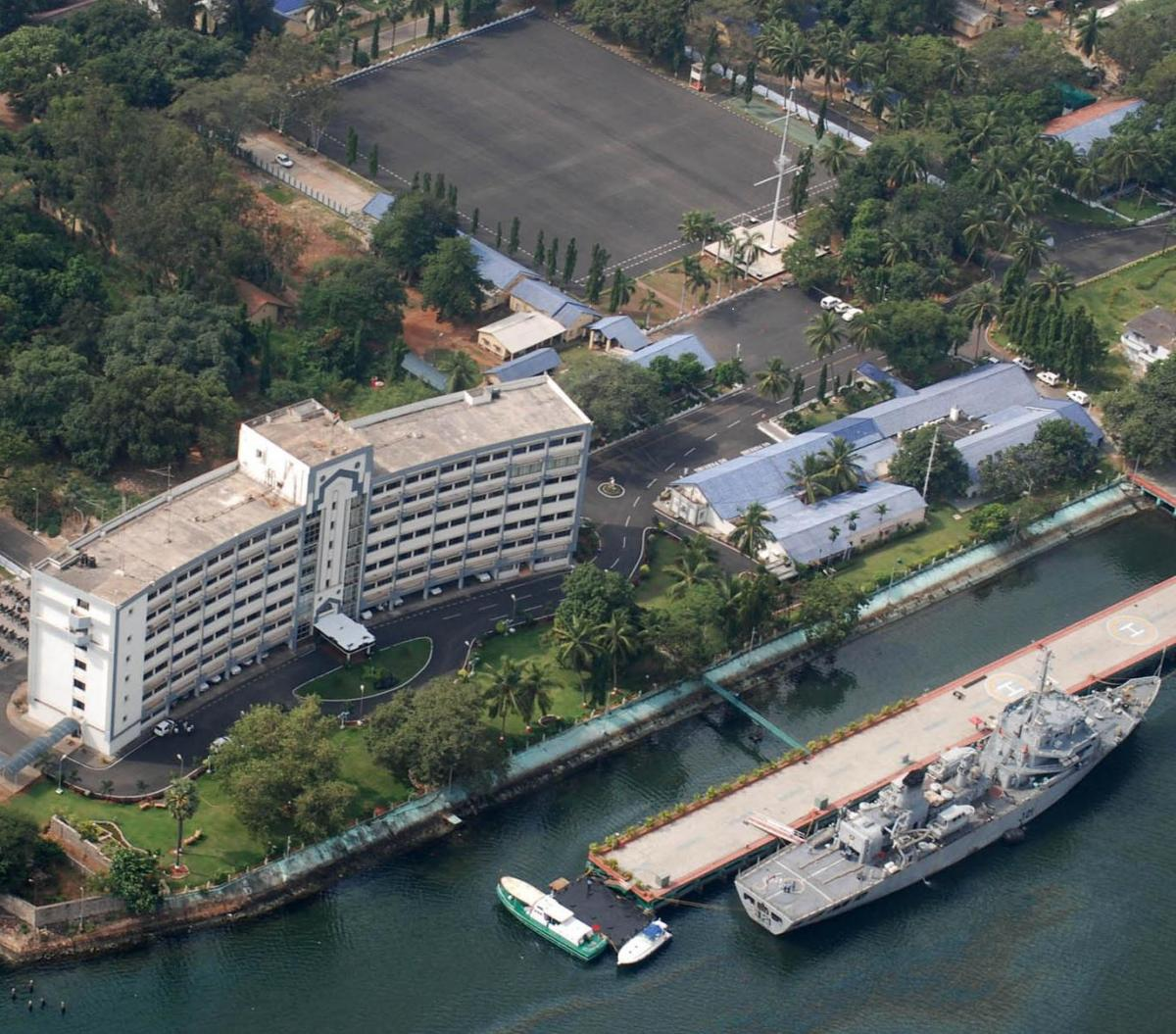
The HQ of the Eastern Naval Command at Visakhapatnam.

== History ==
After the independence and the partition of India on 15 August 1947, the ships and personnel of the Royal Indian Navy were divided between the Dominion of India and the Dominion of Pakistan. The division of the ships was on the basis of two-thirds of the fleet to India, one third to Pakistan.

The Surface Fleet of the Navy was called Indian Fleet and was commanded by the Flag Officer Commanding Indian Fleet (FOCIF). Initially, the shore establishments on the eastern coast were headed by a captain in the appointment of Naval Officer-in-Charge, Vishakapatnam (NOIC). This was subsequently upgraded to the appointment of Commodore East (COMEAST), a One Star appointment. The FOCIF and COMEAST reported into the Chief of the Naval Staff. In July 1967, COMEAST was upgraded to the two-star appointment of Flag Officer, East Coast (FOEC). On 1 March 1968, the Eastern Fleet was also created. With this, the appointment of FOEC was re-designated Flag Officer Commanding-in-Chief Eastern Naval Command (FOC-in-C ENC). The Indian Fleet was split between the Western Fleet and the Eastern Fleet with the Fleet Officer Commanding Eastern Fleet (FOCEF) reporting into the FOC-in-C ENC. On 1 March 1971, Vice Admiral Nilakanta Krishnan took over as FOC-in-C, the first three-star officer to lead the command.

The oldest naval establishment of the Eastern Seaboard was the INS Circars, Visakhapatnam, which was identified as "an important convoy assembly point" for the Royal Indian Navy flotillas. A small Naval Base was established there on 12 December 1939 and the base was designated as HMIS Circars on 12 April 1942. Now, the base is the base depot ship of the Eastern Naval Command. It is the logistics and administrative support establishment of the Command, supporting all ships and units based in Visakhapatnam. As of 2018, the establishment supports 52 additional units with strength of 2,300 sailors and 400 officers, besides accommodating live-in sailors of Circars.

== Area of responsibility ==
Under the Flag Officer Commanding-in-Chief Eastern Naval Command (FOC-in-C East) is the Flag Officer Commanding Eastern Fleet (FOCEF), Commodore Commanding Submarines (East) (COMCOS (E)), Admiral Superintendent Dockyard for Visakhapatnam, shore establishments, and five Naval Officers-in-Charge (NOICs).

The Eastern naval Command has the states of Andhra Pradesh, Odisha and Tamil Nadu etc., under its area of responsibility.

The FOC-in-C (East) is the submarine operating authority, under whom COMCOS (E) operates. The 11th (Sindhughosh class submarine) and 8th (Foxtrot class) Submarine Squadrons operate under COMCOS (E). INS Virbahu, a submarine base commissioned on 19 May 1971, is the alma mater of the Indian Navy submariners.

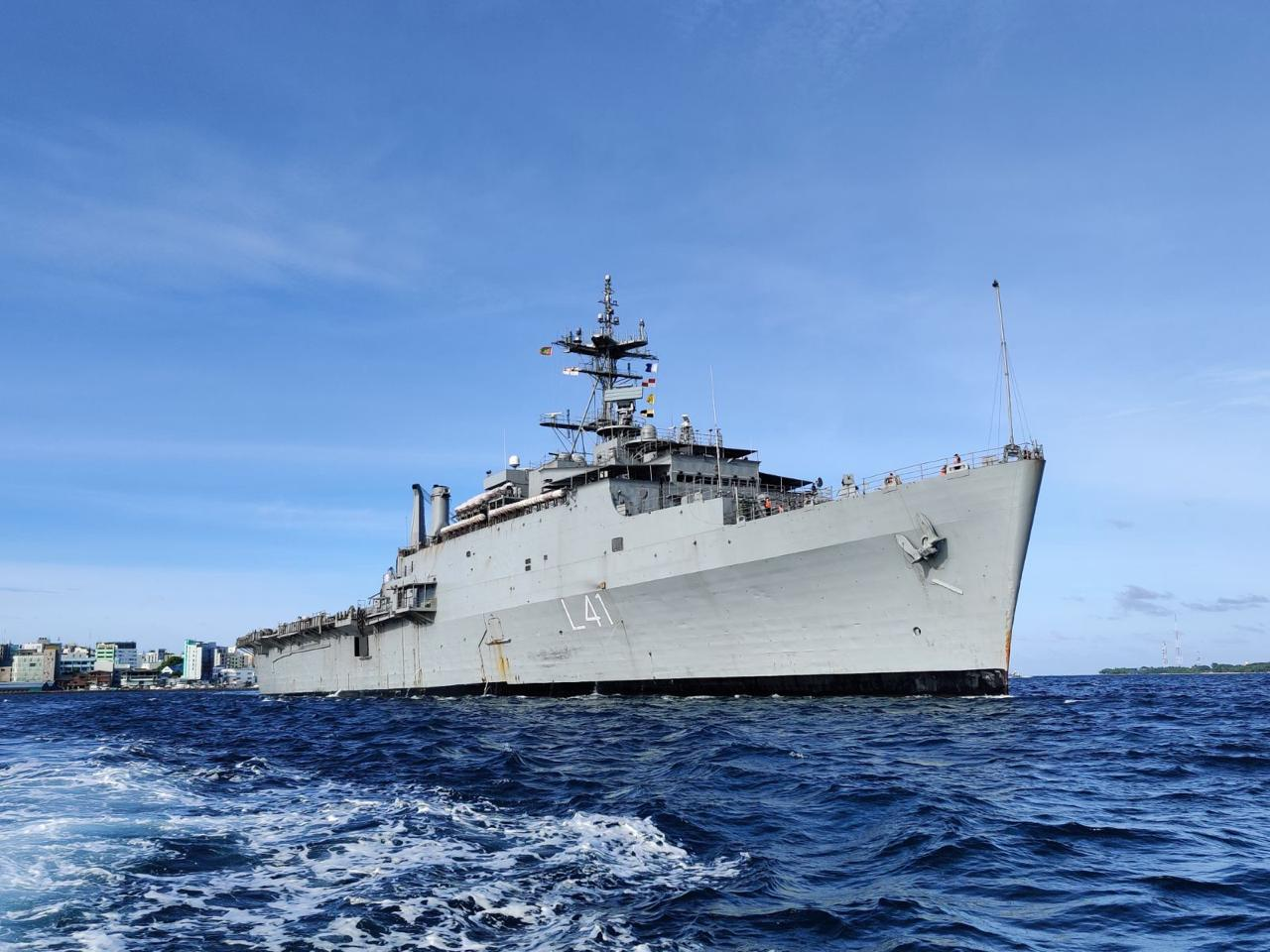
INS Jalashwa flagship of Eastern Naval Command

== Organization ==
The Eastern Naval Command is organized as follows:

| Post | Current Holder | References |
|---|---|---|
| Flag Officer Commanding-in-Chief | Vice Admiral Sanjay Bhalla, AVSM, NM | |
| Chief of Staff | Vice Admiral Susheel Menon, VSM | |
| Flag Officer Commanding Eastern Fleet | Rear Admiral Alok Ananda, YSM | |
| Flag Officer Commanding Tamil Nadu & Puducherry Naval Area | Rear Admiral Upal Kundu, VSM | |
| Flag Officer Submarines | Rear Admiral Sameer Sanjay Pote, YSM | |
| Admiral Superintendent Dockyard (ASD) - Visakhapatnam | Rear Admiral R. S. Dhaliwal | |
| Commodore Commanding Submarines (East) | Commodore H. S. Kelkar | |

== Naval bases ==
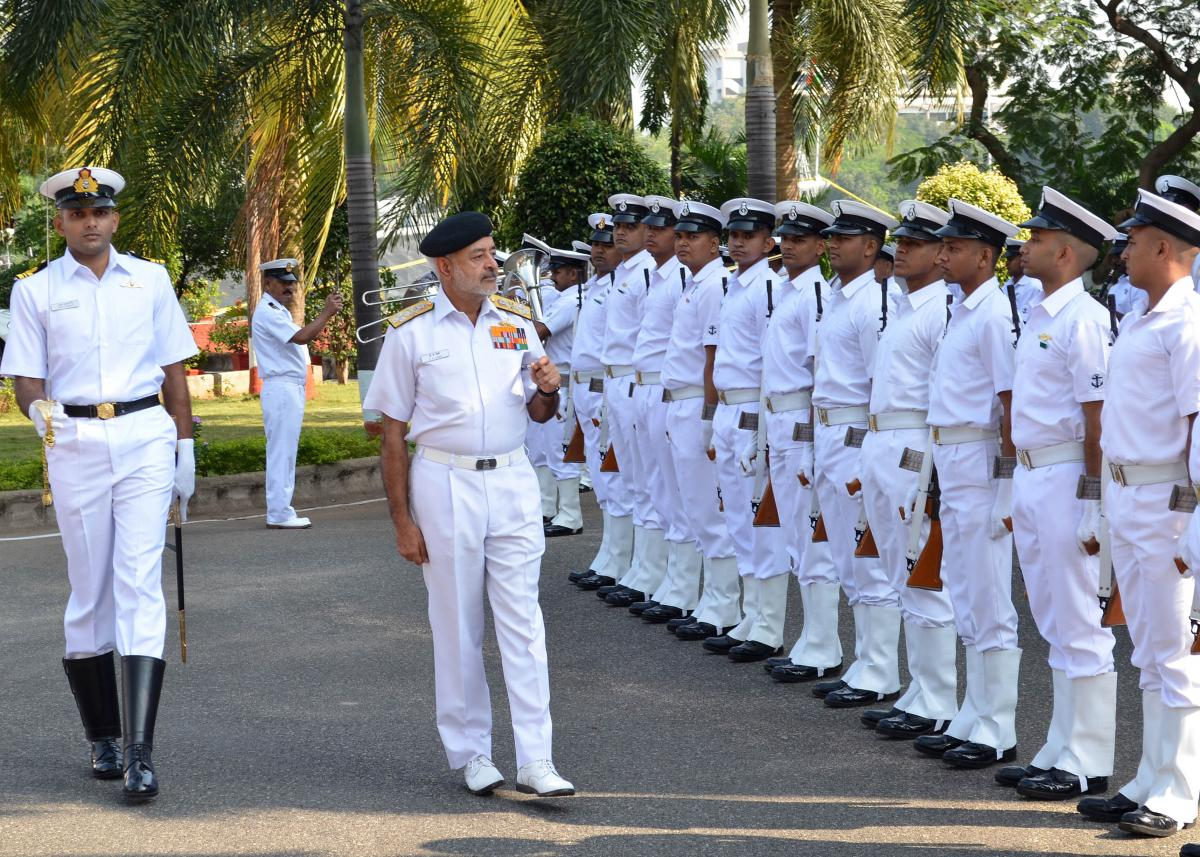
Admiral DK Joshi, then Chief of the Naval Staff, receiving a guard of honour during a visit to the Eastern Naval Command in November 2013

The headquarters in Visakhapatnam, is also a strategically important dockyard for two nuclear-powered submarines of the Arihant-class submarine. Due to congestion and heavy shipping traffic, a new 20 square km base INS Varsha is being developed for exclusive naval use about 50 km south of Visakhapatnam.

The Eastern Navy fleet is distributed among its bases at Paradip, Tuticorin, Kakinada and Chennai on the east coast, and in the Andaman and Nicobar Islands. The Navy has opened its latest naval air base, INS Baaz, at the southernmost tip of the Andaman and Nicobar Islands to secure the strategically important Straits of Malacca, and another naval air station in Kolkata to base an unmanned aerial vehicle squadron.

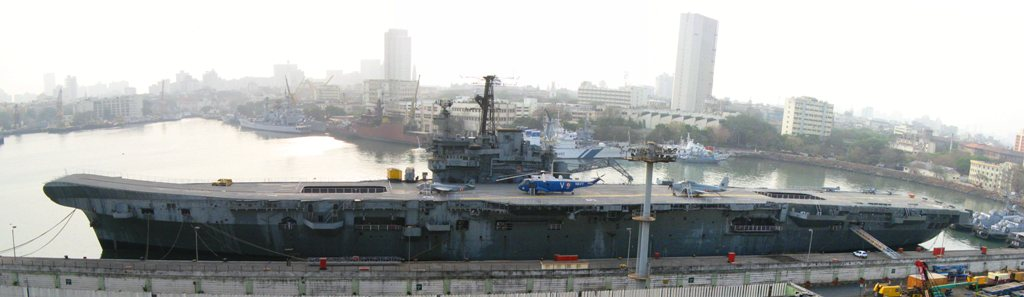
The ex-INS Vikrant as a museum ship in Mumbai.

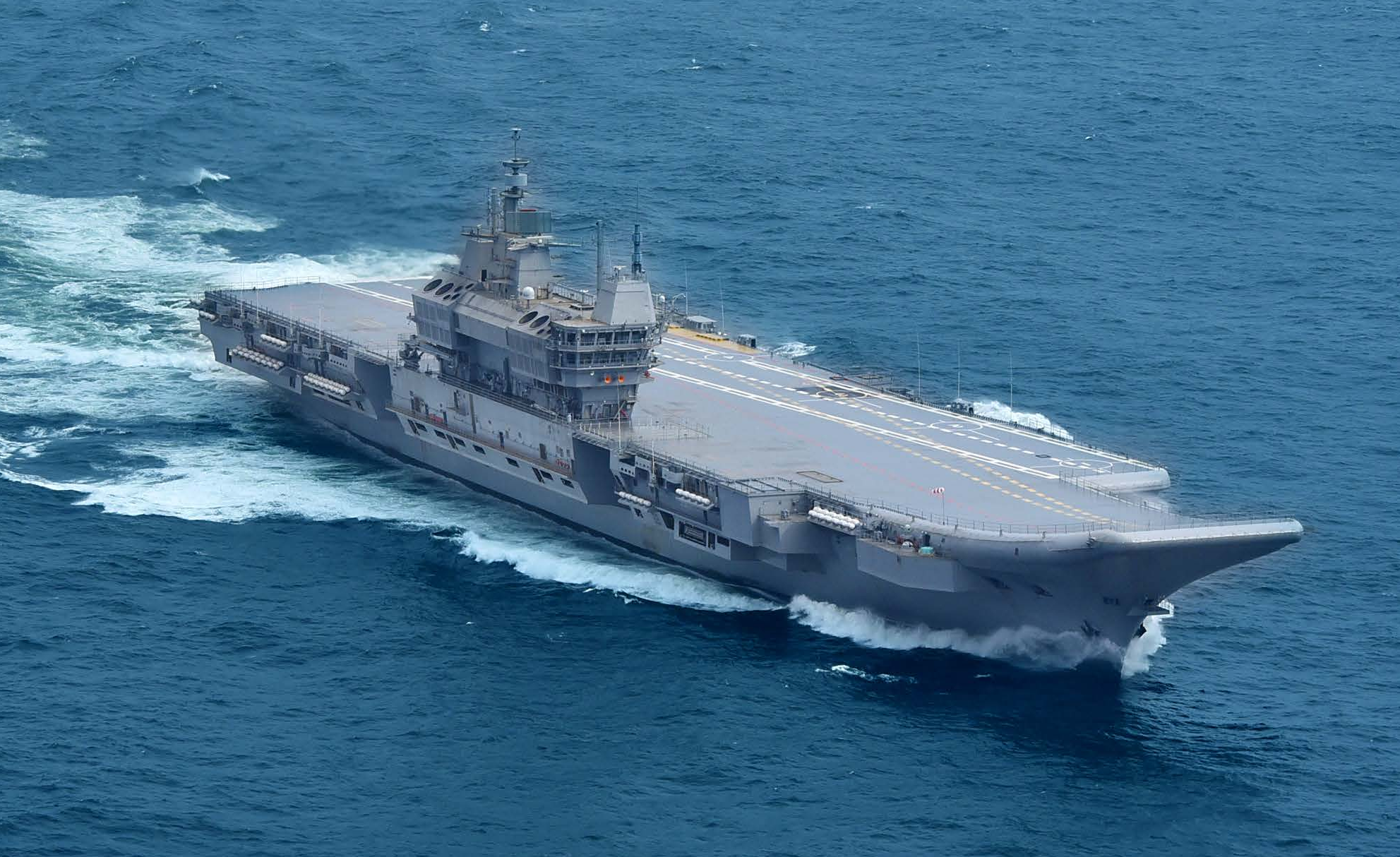
INS Vikrant during its sea trials

| Base | City | State/Territory | Role |
|---|---|---|---|
| INS Circars | Visakhapatnam | Andhra Pradesh | Logistics and Administrative support |
| INS Dega | Visakhapatnam | Andhra Pradesh | Naval Air Station |
| INS Virbahu | Visakhapatnam | Andhra Pradesh | Submarine base |
| INS Satavahana | Visakhapatnam | Andhra Pradesh | Submarine Training Base of the Indian Navy |
| INHS Kalyani | Visakhapatnam | Andhra Pradesh | Naval Hospital |
| INS Kalinga | Visakhapatnam | Andhra Pradesh | Naval Missile Depot |
| INS Eksila | Visakhapatnam | Andhra Pradesh | Marine gas turbine maintenance |
| INS Karna | Visakhapatnam | Andhra Pradesh | MARCOS Base |
| INS Varsha (Under Construction) | Rambilli | Andhra Pradesh | Future submarine base for the ENC |
| INS Adyar | Chennai | Tamil Nadu | Logistics and Maintenance support |
| NAE Chennai | Chennai | Tamil Nadu | Naval Air Enclave at Chennai International Airport |
| INS Parundu | Uchipuli | Tamil Nadu | Naval Air Station |
| INS Rajali | Arakkonam | Tamil Nadu | Naval Air Station |
| INS Kattabomman | Tirunelveli | Tamil Nadu | Submarine VLF facility |
| INS Tuticorin | Tuticorin | Tamil Nadu | Logistics support |
| INS Netaji Subhas | Kolkata | West Bengal | Logistics and Administrative support |
| INS Paradip (Under Construction) | Paradip | Odisha | Forward Operating Base |
| INS Bhubaneswar (Under Construction) | Bhubaneswar | Odisha | Naval Air Enclave |

== Capabilities ==
In 2005, Eastern Naval Command was home to 30 warships. Since then it has grown to include INS Jalashwa is the flagship of Eastern Fleet and provides amphibious capabilities to the Indian Navy in the Bay of Bengal. Eastern Fleet is equipped with submarine pens and maintenance dockyards. The Amphibious Task Group of Eastern Naval Fleet has INS Jalashwa (LPD), INS Vikrant (Aircraft carrier) It's CBG includes the Delhi-class & Rajput-class destroyers, Nilgiri-class & Shivalik-class frigates, Arnala-class, 2 Kora-class, Kamorta-class & Khukri-class corvettes, Sindhughosh-class submarines, Airhant-class (SSBNs) and the Akula-class submarine INS Chakra. Naval aviation is provided by Westland Sea King, MH-60R, Kamov-31 & Kamov-27 helicopters. For Fixed-wing aircraft it's P-8I and Mig-29K naval fighters. Apart from these, a number of smaller vessels such as Patrol Vessels, fast attack craft, support vessels and other auxiliary ships.

== Future ==
Until 1997, INS Vikrant (1961) was the flagship of Eastern Fleet. After her de-commissioning in 1997, the Eastern Fleet has been without an aircraft carrier. Its aircraft carrier capability will get restored after first indigenously built aircraft carrier INS Vikrant (2013) joins the Eastern Fleet by 2023 after completing extensive sea trials and is likely to based in Vishakapatnam.

== List of commanders ==
| S.No | Name | Assumed office | Left office | Notes | References |
|---|---|---|---|---|---|
Naval Officer-in-Charge, Visakhapatnam (NOIC Visakhapatnam)
| 1 | Captain Geoffrey Gowlland | 11 January 1948 | 12 December 1951 | Seconded from the Royal Navy | |
| 2 | Captain Bhaskar Sadashiv Soman | 12 December 1951 | 2 December 1953 | First Indian appointee. Later served as Chief of the Naval Staff. | |
| 3 | Captain Reginald Sawhny | 2 December 1953 | June 1954 | | |
| 4 | Captain Reginald Sherring David | 27 December 1954 | | | |
Commodore, East Coast (COMEAST)
| 1 | Commodore Manchar Krishna Heble | 12 June 1958 | 5 February 1960 | | |
| 2 | Commodore G. S. Kapoor | 5 February 1960 | June 1962 | | |
| 3 | Commodore Jai Shankar Mehra | 14 June 1962 | June 1965 | | |
| 4 | Commodore Douglas St. John Cameron | June 1965 | 31 May 1967 | | |
Flag Officer, East Coast (FOEC)
| 1 | Rear Admiral Kesavapillai Ramakrishnan Nair | July 1967 | 1 March 1968 | | |
Flag Officer Commanding-in-Chief Eastern Naval Command (FOC-in-C ENC)
| 1 | Rear Admiral Kesavapillai Ramakrishnan Nair PVSM | 1 March 1968 | 1 March 1971 | | |
| 2 | Vice Admiral Nilakanta Krishnan PVSM, DSC | 1 March 1971 | March 1973 | | |
| 3 | Vice Admiral K. L. Kulkarni PVSM | March 1973 | 1 April 1976 | | |
| 4 | Vice Admiral Swaraj Parkash PVSM, MVC, AVSM | 1 April 1976 | 1 March 1977 | | |
| 5 | Vice Admiral S. H. Sarma PVSM | 1 March 1977 | 2 February 1978 | | |
| 6 | Vice Admiral M. R. Schunker PVSM, AVSM | 2 February 1978 | 24 March 1980 | | |
| 7 | Vice Admiral Mihir K. Roy PVSM, AVSM | 24 March 1980 | 31 March 1984 | | |
| 8 | Vice Admiral Jayant Ganpat Nadkarni PVSM, AVSM, NM, VSM | 8 April 1984 | 28 February 1986 | Later served as Chief of the Naval Staff | |
| 9 | Vice Admiral S. C. Chopra PVSM, AVSM, NM | 28 February 1986 | 27 February 1989 | | |
| 10 | Vice Admiral Laxminarayan Ramdas PVSM, AVSM, VrC, VSM | 27 February 1989 | 30 November 1990 | Later served as Chief of the Naval Staff | |
| 11 | Vice Admiral Vijai Singh Shekhawat PVSM, AVSM, VrC | 31 December 1990 | 31 October 1992 | Later served as Chief of the Naval Staff | |
| 12 | Vice Admiral B. Guha PVSM, AVSM | 10 November 1992 | 31 May 1995 | | |
| 13 | Vice Admiral P. S. Das PVSM, UYSM, VSM | 31 May 1995 | 27 February 1998 | | |
| 14 | Vice Admiral Vinod Pasricha PVSM, AVSM, NM | 28 February 1998 | 28 February 2001 | | |
| 15 | Vice Admiral John Colin De Silva PVSM, AVSM | 1 March 2001 | 1 January 2002 | | |
| 16 | Vice Admiral Raman Puri PVSM, AVSM, VSM | 15 January 2002 | 30 September 2003 | | |
| 17 | Vice Admiral O. P. Bansal PVSM, AVSM, VSM | 1 October 2003 | 30 September 2005 | | |
| 18 | Vice Admiral Sureesh Mehta PVSM, AVSM | 1 October 2005 | 31 October 2006 | Later served as Chief of the Naval Staff | |
| 19 | Vice Admiral Arun Kumar Singh PVSM, AVSM, NM | 1 November 2006 | 31 March 2007 | | |
| 20 | Vice Admiral Raman Prem Suthan PVSM, AVSM, VSM | 1 April 2007 | 30 March 2008 | Later served as Vice Chief of the Naval Staff | |
| 21 | Vice Admiral Nirmal Kumar Verma PVSM, AVSM | 1 April 2008 | 31 August 2009 | Later served as Chief of the Naval Staff | |
| 22 | Vice Admiral Anup Singh PVSM, AVSM, NM | 1 September 2009 | 31 October 2011 | | |
| 23 | Vice Admiral Anil Chopra PVSM, AVSM | 1 November 2011 | 2014 | Later served as FOC-in-C Western Naval Command | |
| 24 | Vice Admiral Satish Soni PVSM, AVSM, NM | 16 June 2014 | 29 February 2016 | | |
| 25 | Vice Admiral Harish Bisht PVSM, AVSM | 1 March 2016 | 30 October 2017 | | |
| 26 | Vice Admiral Karambir Singh PVSM, AVSM | 31 October 2017 | 30 May 2019 | Later served as Chief of the Naval Staff | |
| 27 | Vice Admiral Atul Kumar Jain PVSM, AVSM, VSM | 1 June 2019 | 28 February 2021 | Later serves as Chief of Integrated Defense Staff | |
| 28 | Vice Admiral Ajendra Bahadur Singh PVSM, AVSM, VSM | 28 February 2021 | 28 November 2021 | Later served as FOC-in-C Western Naval Command | |
| 29 | Vice Admiral Biswajit Dasgupta PVSM, AVSM, YSM, VSM | 1 December 2021 | 31 July 2023 | | |
| 30 | Vice Admiral Rajesh Pendharkar AVSM, VSM | 1 August 2023 | 31 October 2025 | | |
| 31 | Vice Admiral Sanjay Bhalla AVSM, NM | 31 October 2025 | Present | | |

== See also ==
- Southern Naval Command
- Western Naval Command
