= Susheel Menon =

Indian Navy Admiral

Vice Admiral Susheel Menon AVSM, VSM
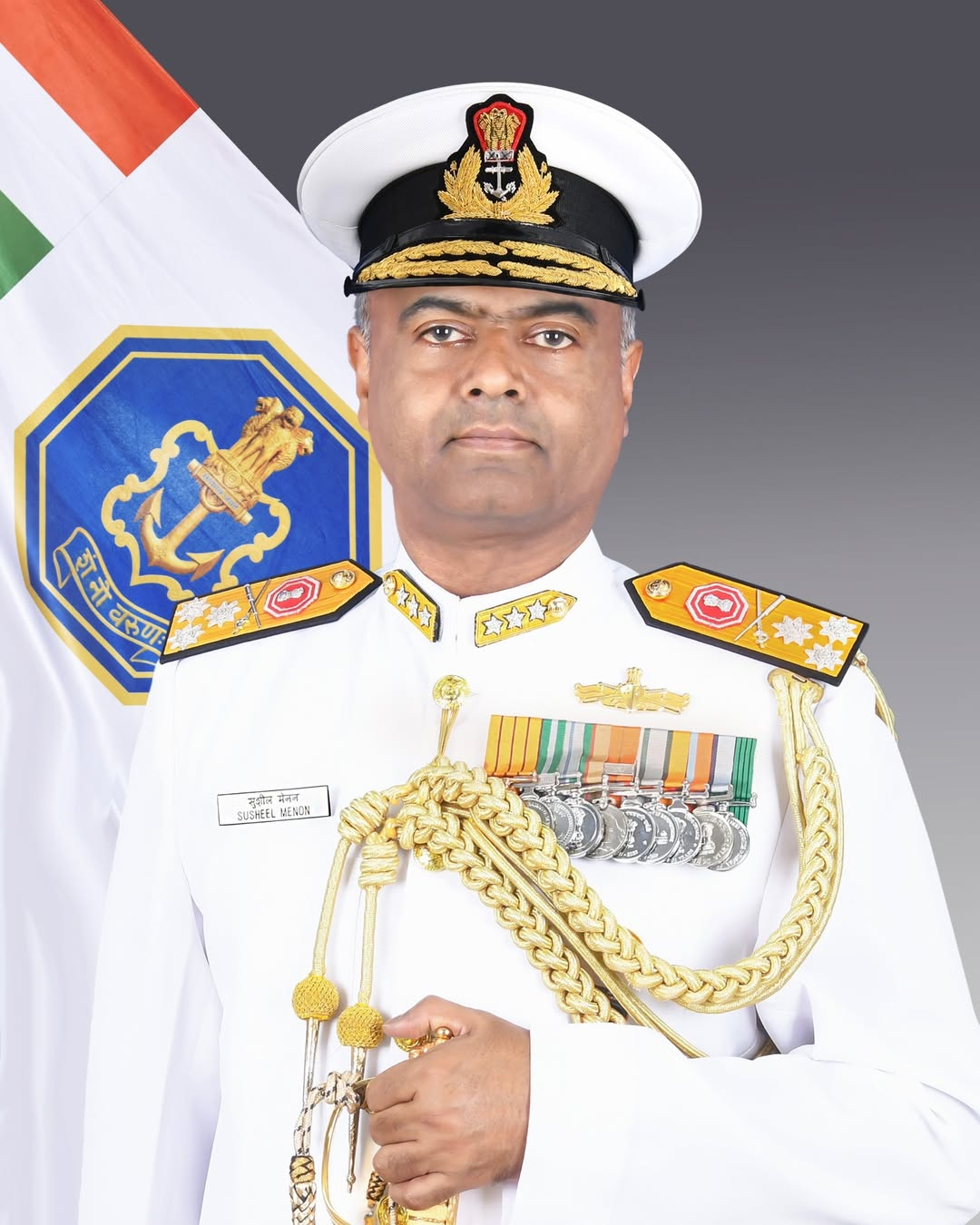
- Vice Admiral Susheel Menon
- Military career
- Allegiance: India
- Branch: Indian Navy
- Service years: 1992 – present
- Rank: Vice Admiral
- Commands: Eastern Naval Command; Eastern Fleet; INS Vikramaditya (R33); INS Kolkata (D63); INS Kirpan (P44); IN TRV-71
- Awards: Ati Vishisht Seva Medal; Vishisht Seva Medal

Vice Admiral Susheel Menon, AVSM, VSM is a serving flag officer in the Indian Navy currently serving as the chief of staff, Eastern Naval Command. A gunnery and missile specialist, He earlier served as the Flag Officer Commanding Eastern Fleet and as the Flag Officer Sea Training. He commanded the aircraft carrier INS Vikramaditya (R33) from 2021 to 2023.

== Naval career ==
Menon was commissioned into the Indian Navy on 1 July 1992. He is a specialist in gunnery and was adjudged the Best All Round Officer at the Gunnery School INS Dronacharya. He spent his early years on board the Pondicherry-class minesweeper INS Kakinada as the gunnery officer and was part of the commissioning crew of Magar-class amphibious warfare vessel INS Gharial (L23). He then commanded the Astravahini-class torpedo recovery vessel IN TRV-71. After his gunnery specialisation, Menon served as the gunnery officer of the Rajput-class destroyer INS Ranvijay (D55) and the Talwar-class frigate INS Talwar (F40) as commissioning crew.

In 2006, Menon attended the staff course at the Naval Command and Staff College, Jakarta, in Indonesia. After the course, he was appointed fleet gunnery officer of the Western Fleet. He then moved to Naval headquarters and served as a joint director in the Personnel branch. In 2010, he took over as the executive officer of the Delhi-class guided missile destroyer INS Mumbai (D62).

In 2011, Menon was appointed commanding officer of the Khukri-class corvette INS Kirpan (P44). After about eighteen months in command of Kirpan, he attended the Higher Command Course at the Naval War College, Newport, Rhode Island in the USA. After completing the course, he returned to India and was appointed Directing staff at the Naval War College, Goa. He subsequently was appointed naval assistant to the vice chief of the naval staff.

Menon took over as the commanding officer of the lead ship of her-class of guided-missile destroyers INS Kolkata (D63). For his command of Kolkata, he was awarded the Vishisht Seva Medal on 26 January 2019. In the rank of commodore, he served as commodore (operations) at HQ Eastern Naval Command and as commodore (strategy, concepts and transformation) at Naval headquarters. In December 2021, Menon took over as the 7th commanding officer of the aircraft carrier INS Vikramaditya (R33).

=== Flag rank ===
Menon was promoted to flag rank in May 2023 and was appointed Flag Officer Sea Training (FOST) at Kochi. As FOST, his charter included the conduct of the operational sea training of all ships of the Indian Navy and the Indian Coast Guard. On 21 August 2024, he took over as the 48th Flag Officer Commanding Eastern Fleet from Rear Admiral Rajesh Dhankhar. He was awarded the Ati Vishisht Seva Medal on 26 January 2026.

== Awards and decorations ==

Ati Vishisht Seva Medal	Vishisht Seva Medal	Samanya Seva Medal	Operation Vijay Medal
Operation Parakram Medal	Sainya Seva Medal	75th Independence Anniversary Medal	50th Independence Anniversary Medal
30 Years Long Service Medal	20 Years Long Service Medal		9 Years Long Service Medal

== See also ==
- Flag Officer Sea Training

Military offices
Preceded by C. R. Praveen Nair	Commanding officer INS Vikramaditya; 2021 – 2023	Succeeded by Vishal Bishnoi
Preceded by Rahul Vilas Gokhale	Flag Officer Sea Training; 2023 – 2024	Succeeded by Srinivas Maddula
Preceded by Rajesh Dhankhar	Flag Officer Commanding Eastern Fleet; 2024 – 2025	Succeeded by Alok Ananda
Preceded by Sameer Saxena	Chief of staff, Eastern Naval Command; 2025 – Present	Incumbent
