= Soni Methu =

Kenyan journalist

- Born: May 29, 1984; Kenya
- Died: April 11, 2019 (age 34); Diani, Kwale County, Kenya
- Education: Strathmore University
- Occupations: Journalist, television presenter

Soni Methu (May 29, 1984 – April 11, 2019) was a Kenyan journalist and television presenter. She hosted Inside Africa on CNN International from 2014 to 2015.

== Early life and education ==
Methu was born in Mombasa, Kenya. She attended Mary Mount High School in Molo, and graduated from Strathmore University with a degree in information technology.

== Career ==
Methu appeared in plays and played a teenager on a Kenyan television drama, Hila, before she co-hosted Taj, a talk show. She started her journalism career at Kenya Broadcasting Corporation. She was an East Africa correspondent for E News Africa and ENCA. She covered events in Kenya, Somalia, South Sudan, Rwanda, Uganda and Tanzania, including the terrorist attack at Nairobi's Westgate Mall in 2013. She was based in Nairobi as the first Kenyan host of CNN's Inside Africa, from 2014 to 2015. In 2016 she moderated a panel discussion on technology and travel in Nairobi. She worked for China Global Television Network in her last years.

== Personal life ==
Methu died suddenly in 2019, at the age of 34, in Diani, Kenya.
