= Alok Ananda =

Indian Navy Admiral

Vice Admiral Alok Ananda YSM
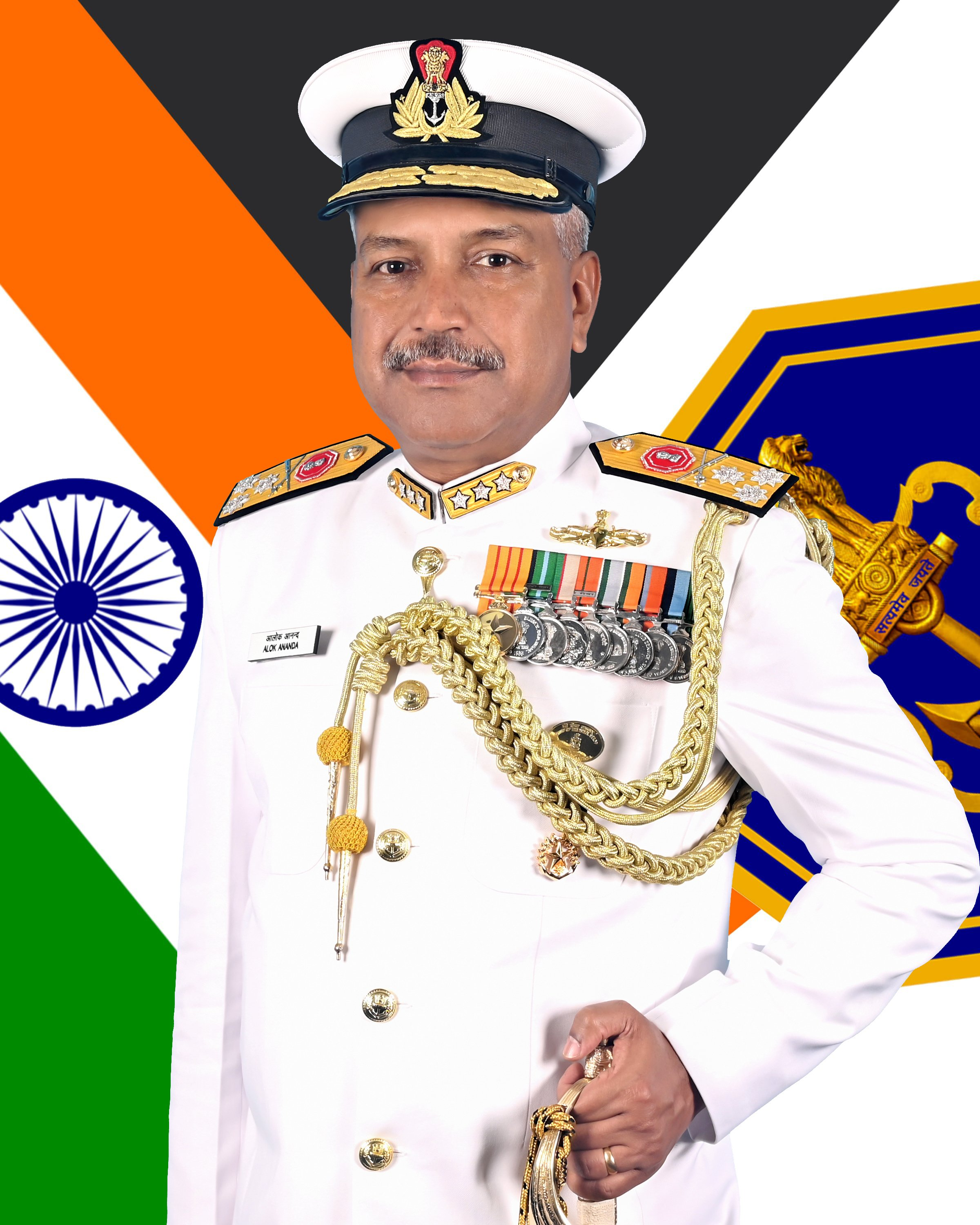
- Education: Indian Naval Academy
- Military career
- Allegiance: India
- Branch: Indian Navy
- Service years: 1993 – present
- Rank: Vice Admiral
- Commands: Indian Naval Academy; Eastern Fleet; INS Satpura (F48); INS Ghorpad (L14)
- Awards: Yudh Seva Medal

Vice Admiral Alok Ananda, YSM is a serving Flag officer in the Indian Navy. He currently serves as the Commandant of Indian Naval Academy. He earlier served as the Flag Officer Commanding Eastern Fleet.

== Naval career ==
Ananda attended the Naval Academy, Goa and was commissioned into the Indian Navy on 1 July 1993. He completed his Midshipman training onboard the aircraft carrier INS Viraat (R22), where he was awarded the Gold Medal for his outstanding performance. He specialised in Navigation and Direction and served as the Navigation officer of four warships. His first command was the Kumbhir-class tank landing ship INS Ghorpad (L14). During his tenure, Ghorpad was awarded the Best Landing Ship trophy. He also served as an instructor at the National Defence Academy, Khadakwasla.

Ananda attended the Defence Services Staff College, Wellington where he was awarded the Scudder Medal for standing first overall in the staff course. He subsequently served as the Joint Director (Naval Plans) at naval headquarters. Back at sea, he served as the executive officer of the Rajput-class destroyer INS Ranvijay (D55). During this tenure, "Ranvijay" was awarded the Best Ship Trophy. He served as an instructor at his alma maters, the Navigation and Direction school at Kochi and the DSSC.

As a Captain, Ananda served as Captain (Naval Operations) at NHQ. During his tenure as Captain (Naval Operations), he oversaw the successful conduct of Operation Raahat in Yemen. On 26 January 2016, he was awarded the Yudh Seva Medal. He then attended the National Defence College of Thailand where he was awarded prize for the Best Research Paper. Ananda subsequently served as Captain (Strategy, Concepts and Transformation), also at NHQ. In the rank of Commodore, he also served as Commodore (Naval Operations) at NHQ.

In 2018, Ananda took command of the Shivalik-class multi-role frigate INS Satpura (F48). In September 2018, Commander Abhilash Tomy suffered an accident while participating in the 2018 Golden Globe Race. He was caught in a violent storm in the Southern Indian Ocean where his yacht Thuriya was dismasted and he suffered a severe injury to his spine. A multinational rescue effort was launched. Satpura was on an operational deployment and was diverted for the search and rescue mission (SAR) christened Operation Raksham. Ananda had just received the news of his father's passing and chose not to go home for the rituals and proceeded with the SAR mission. Satpura, after fuelling from the fleet tanker INS Jyoti which was also despatched for the mission, arrived off Ile Amsterdam and safely evacuated Tomy using the ship’s helicopter on 28 September. The ship brought Tomy safely to Visakhapatnam on 6 October. During Ananda's command tenure, Satpura was adjudged the Best Ship of the Eastern Fleet for its exceptional performance and high operational tempo.

=== Flag rank ===
Ananda was promoted to flag rank in November 2023 and appointed Assistant Chief of the Naval Staff (Plans and Policy) at NHQ. On 17 October 2025, he took command of the Eastern Fleet as the Flag Officer Commanding Eastern Fleet from Rear Admiral Susheel Menon. In June and July 2026, ships of the Eastern Fleet, under his command, visited Vietnam, Thailand and Singapore as part of their operational deployment to the South East Asia Region. On 29 July 2026, he relinquished command of the Eastern Fleet, handing over to Rear Admiral Vishal Bishnoi. On 1 August, he was promoted to the rank of Vice Admiral and appointed Commandant of Indian Naval Academy.

== Awards and decorations ==
Ananda was awarded the Chief of the Naval Staff commendation card and the Flag Officer Commanding-in-Chief Southern Naval Command commendation card, apart from the Yudh Seva Medal in 2016.

Yudh Seva Medal	Samanya Seva Medal	Operation Parakram Medal	Sainya Seva Medal
75th Independence Anniversary Medal	50th Independence Anniversary Medal		30 Years Long Service Medal
	20 Years Long Service Medal	9 Years Long Service Medal	

== See also ==
- Operation Raahat
- Abhilash Tomy
- 2018 Golden Globe Race

Military offices
Preceded by Susheel Menon	Flag Officer Commanding Eastern Fleet; 2025 – 2026	Succeeded by Vishal Bishnoi
Preceded by Manish Chadha	Commandant of Indian Naval Academy; 2026 – Present	Incumbent
