= Soni Chaurasia =

Indian dancer

- Born: 1983 (age 41–42); Uttar Pradesh, India
- Occupation(s): Dancer, skater

Soni Chaurasia is a Kathak dancer and skater from Varanasi, India.

== Training ==
Soni has learnt Kathak from Pt Om Prakash Mishra and Dr Vidhi Nagar. She has also learnt skating from Rajesh Dogra.

== Career ==
Soni created a Guinness World Record after dancing for 124 hours.
