= Satish Soni =

Retired Indian Navy officer

Vice Admiral Satish Soni PVSM, AVSM, NM, ADC
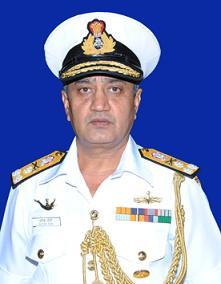
- Military career
- Allegiance: India
- Branch: Indian Navy
- Service years: 1 July 1976 - 2016
- Rank: Vice Admiral
- Commands: Eastern Command; Southern Command; National Defence Academy; INS Kirpan; INS Talwar; INS Delhi
- Awards: Param Vishisht Seva Medal; Ati Vishisht Seva Medal; Nao Sena Medal; Aide-de-camp

Vice Admiral Satish Soni is a retired Indian Navy officer. He is a former Commandant of the National Defence Academy (NDA) and Commander-in-Chief of Southern Command and Eastern Command.

== Education ==
Soni is an alumnus of the NDA and a specialist in Navigation and Aircraft Direction, the Flag Officer is an alumnus of the Defence Services Staff College, Wellington and College of Naval Warfare, Mumbai.

== Career ==
Soni was commissioned into the Indian Navy on 1 July 1976. The Flag Officer's sea commands include the ocean going Pondicherry-class minesweeper INS Kakinada(M 70), the guided missile corvette INS Kirpan, the guided-missile frigate INS Talwar and the guided missile destroyer Delhi. He has had the honour of having commissioned two warships, Kakinada and Talwar, in Russia, as the commanding officer. His staff appointments include deputy director of Personnel, Joint Director of Naval Plans and Naval Assistant to Chief of the Naval Staff at Integrated Headquarters-Ministry of Defence (Navy).

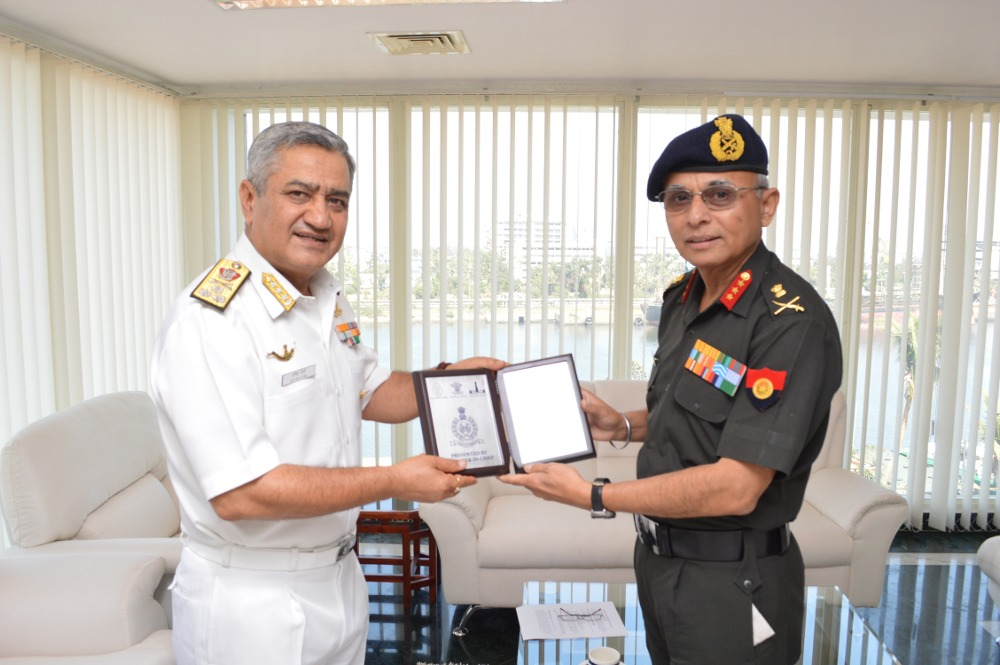
VAdm Satish Soni presenting a memento to Lt Gen Jatinder Sikand (Engineer-in-Chief)

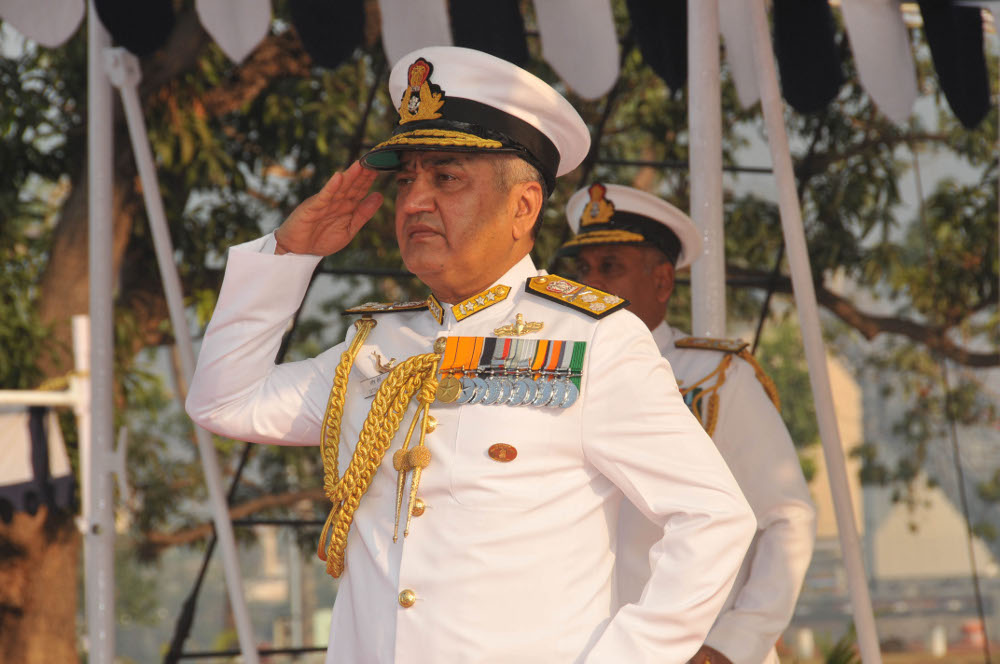
Vice Admiral Satish Soni taking the salute at the 2015 Republic Day Parade

On his elevation to Flag rank, assumed responsibilities as the Assistant Chief of Personnel (Human Resource Development) at Integrated Headquarters-Ministry of Defence (Navy). Subsequently, the Flag Officer commanded the Eastern Fleet of the Indian Navy, and thereafter took over as Chief of Staff, Eastern Naval Command. Vice Admiral Satish then followeded it by being appointed as Commandant, National Defence Academy at Khadakvasla, Pune from 22 November 2009 to 31 December 2010. He served as Flag Officer Commanding in Chief, Southern Naval Command from 2012 to 2014. In his previous assignment, the Vice Admiral served as Deputy Chief of the Naval Staff at Integrated Headquarters Ministry of Defence (Navy) at New Delhi.

He served as Commander in Chief Eastern Command before his retirement in 2016.

Soni is a keen sportsman and represented the Indian Navy in squash and golf in his younger days.

== Awards and decorations ==

Param Vishisht Seva Medal	Ati Vishisht Seva Medal	Nausena Medal	Special Service Medal
Operation Parakram Medal	Videsh Seva Medal	50th Anniversary of Independence Medal	30 Years Long Service Medal
	20 Years Long Service Medal	9 Years Long Service Medal	

Military offices
Preceded by Anil Chopra	Flag Officer Commanding-in-Chief, Eastern Naval Command; 2014- 2015	Succeeded by H. C. S. Bisht
Preceded by Anup Singh	Flag Officer Commanding in Chief, Southern Naval Command; 2012-2014	Succeeded by Surinder Pal Singh Cheema
