= Eastern Fleet (India) =

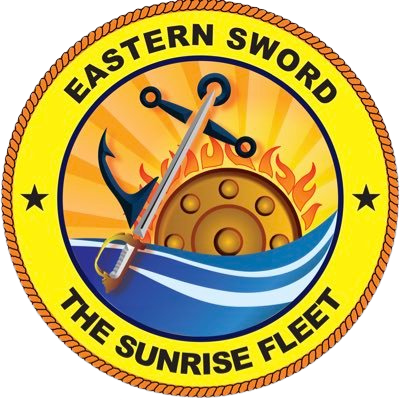
- Founded: 1 November 1971
- Country: India
- Branch: Indian Navy
- Type: Fleet
- Part of: Eastern Naval Command
- Headquarters: Visakhapatnam
- Nickname: Sunrise Fleet

Commanders
- FOCEF: Rear Admiral Alok Ananda, YSM
- Notable commanders: Rear Admiral S H Sarma, PVSM

The Eastern Fleet is a Naval fleet of the Indian Navy. It is known as the Sunrise Fleet. It is headquartered at Visakhapatnam, Andhra Pradesh on the east coast of India. It is a part of the Eastern Naval Command and is responsible for the naval forces in the Bay of Bengal and parts of the Indian Ocean.

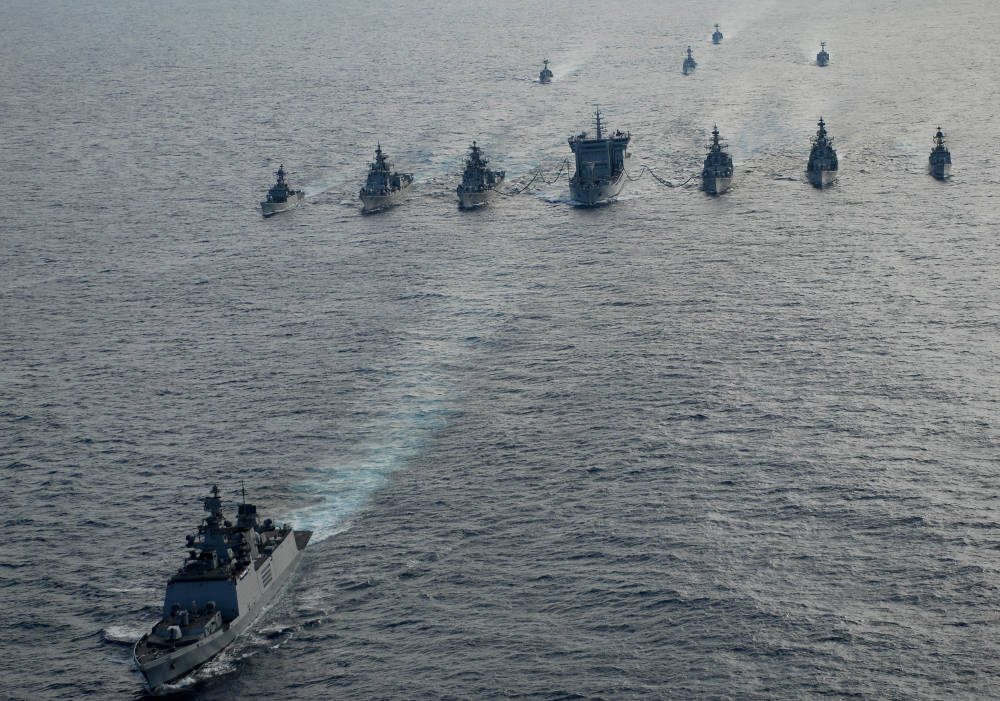
The Eastern Fleet in 2016

The Eastern Fleet was constituted on 1 November 1971. The Fleet is commanded by a Rear Admiral with the title Flag Officer Commanding Eastern Fleet (FOCEF). Rear Admiral Alok Ananda is the current FOCEF, who took over on 17 October 2025.

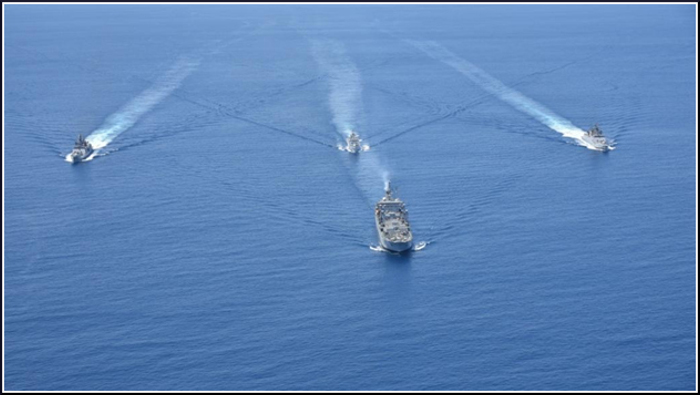
The Eastern Fleet manoeuvring in the Andaman Sea

== History ==
After the independence and the partition of India on 15 August 1947, the ships and personnel of the Royal Indian Navy were divided between the Dominion of India and the Dominion of Pakistan. The division of the ships was on the basis of two-thirds of the fleet to India, one third to Pakistan.

The operational ships of the remaining Royal Indian Navy, minus Pakistan, were initially placed under the command of the Commodore Commanding Indian Naval Squadron (COMINS), later the Rear-Admiral Commanding Indian Naval Squadron (RACINS), whose title was then changed to Flag Officer (Flotilla) Indian Fleet (FOFIF). These appointments were initially held by British officers: Commodore H.N.S. Brown, who was the Commanding Officer of INS Delhi (C74) and serving as COMINS, seemingly at the same time, and later, Commodore (later Rear Admiral) Geoffrey Barnard who became COMINS and later Rear-Admiral Commanding, INS. The Flotilla was later upgraded to the Indian Fleet under a Flag Officer Commanding Indian Fleet (FOCIF). On the proclamation of a Republic in 1950, the 'Royal' title was dropped and the Navy became simply the Indian Navy. Barnard was succeeded by Rear Admiral N.V. ("Uncle Richard") Dickinson, Rear Admiral F.A. Ballance, and then the final British officer Rear Admiral St John Tyrwhitt as FOCIF. In 1956, Rear Admiral Ram Dass Katari became the first Indian flag officer, and was appointed the first Indian FOCIF on 2 October, when he took over from Rear Admiral Tyrwhitt. (title alternately given as Flag Officer (Flotilla). In 1957, INS Mysore (C60) was commissioned, and the flag of Rear Admiral Katari was transferred, INS Mysore thus becoming the flagship of the Indian Fleet.

On 1 March 1968, the Eastern Naval Command was established and the Indian Fleet was renamed as the Western Fleet. With the Indo-Pakistani War of 1971 imminent, the Eastern Fleet was constituted on 1 November 1971. Rear Admiral S H Sarma was appointed the first Flag Officer Commanding Eastern Fleet (FOCEF).

== Indo-Pakistani War of 1971 ==
In mid 1971, The aircraft carrier INS Vikrant, along with the frigates INS Brahmaputra and INS Beas were moved from the Western Fleet to the Eastern Naval Command. Thus, INS Vikrant became the flagship of the Eastern Fleet.

According to Vice Admiral Nilakanta Krishnan, the then Flag Officer Commanding-in-Chief Eastern Naval Command (FOC-in-C ENC), the aim of the Eastern fleet was:

"To destroy the enemy's maritime forces deployed in support of his military operations in East Bengal and to deny all sustenance from reaching the enemy from the sea. This aim would involve keeping under the most careful surveillance the area of a triangle with a base of 270 miles and two sides of 165 and 225 miles, involving 18,000 square miles. Apart from actual surveillance, each merchant ship in this area would have to be challenged, identified and boarded. If neutral and carrying contraband, the ship would have to be escorted to the nearest Indian port. If Pakistani, she would be boarded, captured and taken in as a war prize. Ships that refused to stop would have to be forced to do so. The main task would be the isolation of Chittagong. This would mean physical attack on this port from the sea and the air. The responsibility for this, it had been agreed with the Army and Air Force would be, in the main, that of the Navy."

According to Rear Admiral S H Sarma, the Fleet Commander, the tasks of the Eastern Fleet were:

- To seek and destroy enemy naval units at sea
- To destroy his bases so that enemy naval units could not get shore support
- To establish a blockade off the East Pakistani coast
- To establish contraband control

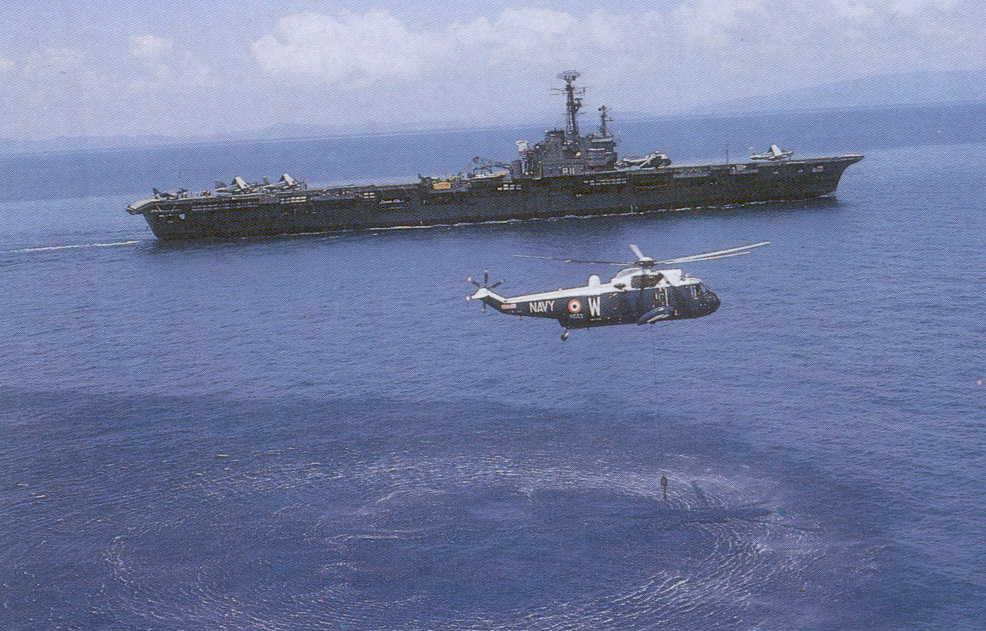
INS Vikrant with a Sea King helicopter during Indo-Pakistani war of 1971.jpg

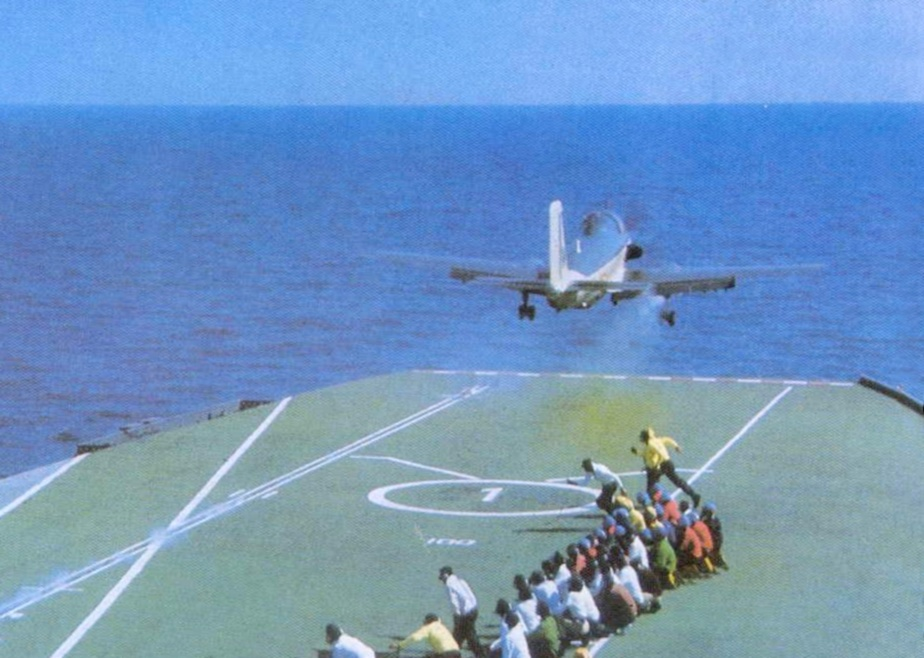
INS Vikrant launches an Alize aircraft during Indo-Pakistani War of 1971

=== ORBAT ===
The Order of Battle of the Eastern Fleet in 1971 was:
Fleet Commander: Rear Admiral S H Sarma, PVSM

- Flag Ship Aircraft Carrier INS Vikrant - Captain Swaraj Parkash, MVC, AVSM

Anti-Aircraft Frigates

- INS Brahmaputra - Captain JC Puri, VrC, VSM
- INS Beas - Commander L Ramdas, VrC, VSM

Anti-Submarine Frigates

- INS Kamorta - Captain M P Awati, VrC
- INS Kavaratti - Commander Subir Pal VrC

Destroyer

- INS Rajput - Lieutenant Commander Inder Singh, VrC

Landing Ship, Tanks

- INS Magar - Commander TN Singhal, NM
- INS Gharial - Commander AK Sharma, NM
- INS Guldar - Commander Utful Dabir, NM

Tanker

- INS Deshdeep - Commander C G Francis

The Eastern Fleet effectively blockaded the ports of East Pakistan. Alizé and Hawker Sea Hawk aircraft from the INS Vikrant and the ships of the fleet bombarded Chittagong and Cox's Bazar. The air strikes of INS Vikrant resulted in the sinking or rendering useless 11 merchant ships totalling 56914 tons. The Eastern Fleet also enforced contraband control until tasked with an amphibious landing to cut off the land escape routes into Burma.

On 11 December, the FOC-in-C ENC signalled the Eastern Fleet:

"Appreciate enemy with senior officers including (Pakistani) FOCEF planning major breakout and will try to get away by hugging the coast. Senior officers may try to escape by air. Approaches to harbour likely to be mined.

"Your mission is:

- (a) Put Chittagong airport out of commission.
- (b) Attack ships in harbour by air and surface units if they break out.

This is undoubtedly the most important mission of the war in the East. The enemy ships must, I repeat, must, be destroyed. Good Luck."''

After the surrender of Pakistan on 16 December 1971, the FOCEF was given the task of reopening and reactivating the Port of Chittagong.

== Kargil War ==
The Indian Navy launched Operation Talwar on 25 May 1999. The entire Western Fleet had sailed from Mumbai to the North Arabian Sea to increase surveillance and adopt a deterrent posture. Elements of the Eastern Fleet joined the Western Fleet in the Arabian Sea later. The joint Western and Eastern Fleets blockaded the Pakistani ports (primarily the Karachi port). They began aggressive patrols and threatened to cut Pakistan's sea trade. This exploited Pakistan's dependence on sea-based oil and trade flows. Later, then-Prime Minister of Pakistan, Nawaz Sharif disclosed that Pakistan was left with just six days of fuel to sustain itself if a full-scale war had broken out.

== Fleet commander ==
The Eastern Fleet is commanded by a rear admiral with the title Flag Officer Commanding Eastern Fleet (FOCEF), based at Visakhapatnam.

== See also ==
- Eastern Naval Command
- Western Fleet
- Flag Officer Commanding Eastern Fleet
