= List of serving admirals of the Indian Navy =

This is a list of serving admirals of the Indian Navy.

== Chief of Defence Staff ==
Post	Rank	Name	Photo	Decorations	Reference
Chief of Defence Staff (Secretary, Department of Military Affairs)*	Admiral	Presently tenanted by an Indian Army Officer			

*Rotational appointment among the Indian Armed Forces.

== Chief of the Naval Staff ==
The Chief of the Naval Staff is the only serving four star admiral in the Indian Navy.

Post	Rank	Name	Photo	Decorations	Reference
Chief of the Naval Staff	Admiral	Krishna Swaminathan		PVSM, AVSM, VSM	

== Vice Chief of the Naval Staff ==
Post	Rank	Name	Photo	Decorations	Reference
Vice Chief of the Naval Staff	Vice Admiral	Ajay Kochhar		PVSM, AVSM, NM	

== Naval commanders (Commander-in-Chief grade) ==
Post	Rank	Name	Photo	Decorations	Reference
Flag Officer Commanding-in-Chief; Western Naval Command	Vice Admiral	Sanjay Vatsayan		PVSM, AVSM, NM	
Flag Officer Commanding-in-Chief; Eastern Naval Command	Vice Admiral	Sanjay Bhalla		AVSM, NM	
Flag Officer Commanding-in-Chief; Southern Naval Command	Vice Admiral	Sameer Saxena		AVSM, NM	
Commander-in-Chief; Strategic Forces Command**	Vice Admiral	Presently tenanted by an Indian Army Officer			
Chief of Integrated Defence Staff**	Vice Admiral	Presently tenanted by an Indian Air Force Officer			
Commander-in-Chief; Andaman and Nicobar Command**	Vice Admiral	Vineet McCarty		AVSM	
Director General; Armed Forces Medical Services**	Surgeon Vice Admiral	Presently tenanted by an Indian Air Force Officer			

**Rotational command among the three services of the Indian Armed Forces.

== Principal Staff Officers (PSO) ==
Post	Rank	Name	Photo	Decorations	Reference
Deputy Chief of the Naval Staff	Vice Admiral	A. N. Pramod		AVSM, YSM	
Chief of Personnel	Vice Admiral	Gurcharan Singh		AVSM, NM	
Chief of Materiel	Vice Admiral	B. Sivakumar		AVSM, VSM	

== Flag officers of Tri-Services Commands ==
Post	Rank	Name	Photo	Decorations	Reference
Deputy Chief of Integrated Defence Staff (Doctrine, Organization & Training)	Vice Admiral	Rajesh Dhankhar		AVSM, NM	
Deputy Chief of Integrated Defence Staff (Operations)	Vice Admiral	Presently tenanted by an Indian Army officer			
Deputy Chief of Integrated Defence Staff (Policy Planning & Force Development)	Vice Admiral	Presently tenanted by an Indian Air Force Officer			
Additional Secretary; Department of Military Affairs	Vice Admiral	Presently tenanted by an Indian Air Force Officer			
Deputy Chief of Integrated Defence Staff (Medical)	Surgeon Vice Admiral	Krishna M Adhikari			
Director General (Organisation & Personnel); Armed Forces Medical Services	Surgeon Vice Admiral	Presently tenanted by an Indian Air Force Officer			
Director General Hospital Services (Armed Forces)	Surgeon Vice Admiral	Dilip Raghavan		VSM	
Joint Secretary (Navy & Defence Staff); Department of Military Affairs	Rear Admiral	Kunal Singh Rajkumar		VSM	
Joint Secretary (Maritime Security); National Security Council Secretariat	Rear Admiral	TVN Prasanna		VSM	
Chief of Staff; Andaman and Nicobar Command	Rear Admiral	Presently served by an Indian Army officer			

== Directors general and controllers ==
Post	Rank	Name	Photo	Decorations	Reference
Director General Medical Services (Navy)	Surgeon Vice Admiral	Shankar Subramanian			
Director General Naval Operations	Vice Admiral	Manish Chadha		AVSM, VSM	
Chief Hydrographer (Officiating)	Rear Admiral	Peush Pawsey			
Director General Project Seabird	Vice Admiral	Vivek Dahiya		NM	
Controller Warship Production and Acquisition	Vice Admiral	Sanjay Sadhu		AVSM, NM	
Controller of Logistics	Vice Admiral	Rajat Kapoor		AVSM	
Inspector General Nuclear Safety	Vice Admiral	A. Y. Sardesai		AVSM VSM	
Controller of Personnel Services	Vice Admiral	C. R. Praveen Nair		AVSM, NM	
Programme Director, Advanced Technology Vessel Project	Vice Admiral				
Director General Naval Projects, Mumbai	Vice Admiral	Ankur Sharma		NM	
Director General Naval Projects, Visakhapatnam	Vice Admiral	K. Srinivas		AVSM	
Director General Warship Design Bureau	Rear Admiral	Sujit Bari			
Additional Director General Warship Design Bureau	Rear Admiral	Iftekhar Alam		NM	
Director General (Submarine Design Group)	Rear Admiral	SL Saji			
Director General Weapons & Electronics Systems Engineering Establishment	Rear Admiral	T Ajit			
Director General Project 75	Rear Admiral	R Vaidhyanathan			

== Chiefs of staff of naval commands ==
Post	Rank	Name	Photo	Decorations	Reference
Chief of Staff; Western Naval Command	Vice Admiral	Rahul Vilas Gokhale		YSM, NM	
Chief of Staff; Eastern Naval Command	Vice Admiral	Susheel Menon		AVSM, VSM	
Chief of Staff; Southern Naval Command	Rear Admiral	Prakash Gopalan			

== Leadership of Training Institutions ==
Post	Rank	Name	Photo	Decorations	Reference
Commandant National Defence Academy	Vice Admiral	Anil Jaggi		AVSM	
Commandant Indian Naval Academy	Vice Admiral	Alok Ananda		YSM	
Commandant Armed Forces Medical College	Surgeon Vice Admiral	Manish Honwad		VSM	
Commandant Naval War College, Goa	Rear Admiral	Manjit Moses Thomas		NM	
Commandant Military Institute of Technology	Rear Admiral	V Ganapathy		NM	
Chief Instructor (Navy); Defence Services Staff College	Rear Admiral	Amit Gurbaxani		NM	
Senior Directing Staff (Navy); National Defence College	Rear Admiral	Sandeep Singh Sandhu		NM	
Deputy Commandant of Indian Naval Academy	Rear Admiral	Happy Mohan		VSM	
Principal, Indian Naval Academy	Rear Admiral	G. Rambabu			
Deputy Commandant National Defence Academy	Rear Admiral	Birendra S Bains		VSM	

== Flag officers commanding fleets ==
Post	Rank	Name	Photo	Decorations	Reference
Flag Officer Commanding Western Fleet	Rear Admiral	Srinivas Maddula		VSM	
Flag Officer Commanding Eastern Fleet	Rear Admiral	Vishal Bishnoi			

== Flag officers commanding naval areas ==
Post	Rank	Name	Photo	Decorations	Reference
Flag Officer Commanding Maharashtra Naval Area	Rear Admiral	Vidhyadhar Harke		VSM	
Flag Officer Commanding Gujarat Naval Area	Rear Admiral	Sritanu Guru		VSM	
Flag Officer Commanding Goa Naval Area & Flag Officer Naval Aviation	Rear Admiral	Ajay D. Theophilus		VSM	
Flag Officer Commanding Karnataka Naval Area	Rear Admiral	Vikram Menon		VSM	
Flag Officer Commanding Tamil Nadu & Puducherry Naval Area	Rear Admiral	Upal Kundu		VSM	

== Assistant Chiefs of the Naval Staff ==
Post	Rank	Name	Photo	Decorations	Reference
Assistant Chief of the Naval Staff (Policy & Plans)	Rear Admiral	B. S. Sodhi			
Assistant Chief of the Naval Staff (Air)	Rear Admiral	Biplab Hota		VSM	
Assistant Chief of the Naval Staff (Submarines)	Rear Admiral	VR Peshwae		VSM	
Assistant Chief of the Naval Staff (Special Submarine Projects)	Rear Admiral	Sriram Amur		VSM	
Assistant Chief of the Naval Staff (Foreign Cooperation & Intelligence)	Rear Admiral	Sachin Reuben Sequeira		SC	
Assistant Chief of the Naval Staff (Communications, Space & Network Centric Operations)	Rear Admiral	Nirbhay Bapna		AVSM, VSM	
Assistant Chief of the Naval Staff (Air Materiel)	Rear Admiral	Anshuman Chauhan			
Assistant Chief of the Naval Staff (Staff Requirements)	Rear Admiral	Prashant Handu			

== Assistant Principal Staff Officers ==
Post	Rank	Name	Photo	Decorations	Reference
Assistant Controller of Carrier Projects	Rear Admiral	Sandeep Mehta		VSM	
Assistant Controller of Warship Production and Acquisition	Rear Admiral				
Assistant Chief of Personnel (Human Resource Development)	Rear Admiral	Shantanu Jha		NM	
Assistant Chief of Personnel (Administration and Civilian)	Rear Admiral	Aditya Hara		NM	
Judge Advocate General	Rear Admiral				
Assistant Controller of Logistics	Rear Admiral	Neeraj Malhotra			
Assistant Chief of Materiel (Nuclear System Maintenance)	Rear Admiral	R Raghuram			
Assistant Chief of Materiel (Information Technology & Systems)	Rear Admiral	Sarath Aashirvad			
Assistant Chief of Materiel (Dockyard & Refit)	Rear Admiral	Vikas Chawla		NM	
Assistant Chief of Materiel (Modernisation)	Rear Admiral	Sanjay Adhana			

== Chief Staff Officers of naval commands ==
Post	Rank	Name	Photo	Decorations	Reference
Chief Staff Officer (Ops); Western Naval Command	Rear Admiral	Sathish Vasudev		NM	
Chief Staff Officer (Ops); Eastern Naval Command	Rear Admiral	Manoj Jha		VSM	
Chief Staff Officer (Training); Southern Naval Command	Rear Admiral	B S Sodhi			
Chief Staff Officer (Tech); Western Naval Command	Rear Admiral	Arvind Rawal		VSM	
Chief Staff Officer (Tech); Eastern Naval Command	Rear Admiral	Gautam Marwaha		VSM	
Chief Staff Officer (Personnel & Administration); Western Naval Command	Rear Admiral	Sundeep K Verma		NM	
Chief Staff Officer (Personnel & Administration); Eastern Naval Command	Rear Admiral	Gokul Krishna Dutta		VSM	

== Admiral superintendents of naval dockyards ==
Post	Rank	Name	Photo	Decorations	Reference
Admiral Superintendent; Naval Dockyard (Mumbai)	Rear Admiral	Ajay Patney			
Admiral Superintendent; Naval Dockyard (Visakhapatnam)	Rear Admiral	R. S. Dhaliwal		NM	
Admiral Superintendent; Naval Ship Repair Yard, Kochi	Rear Admiral	Rajneesh Sharma			
Admiral Superintendent; Naval Ship Repair Yard, Karwar	Rear Admiral	Ravnish Seth			

== Flag officers with independent charge ==
Post	Rank	Name	Photo	Decorations	Reference
Flag Officer Defence Advisory Group	Rear Admiral	Rahul Shankar		NM	
Flag Officer Doctrine & Concepts	Rear Admiral				
Joint Chief Hydrographer	Rear Admiral	Peush Pawsey			
Flag Officer Submarines	Rear Admiral	Sameer Sanjay Pote		YSM	
Flag Officer Sea Training	Rear Admiral	Sundeep Singh Randhawa		VSM	
Additional Director General (A); National Cadet Corps	Rear Admiral	Ashish Bhargava			
Director General; Defence Cyber Agency	Rear Admiral	Sanjay Sachdeva		NM	
Director, Defence Machine Design Establishment	Rear Admiral	Ashwani Kumar Tikoo		VSM	
Additional Director General; Quality Assurance (Navy)	Rear Admiral	Iqbal Singh Grewal			
Project Director (Operations & Training); HQ Advanced Technology Vessel Project	Rear Admiral				
Project Director (Ship Building Center); HQ Advanced Technology Vessel Project	Rear Admiral			NM	
Director General Naval Armament Inspection	Rear Admiral	Rupak Barua		VSM	

== Medical officers ==
Post	Rank	Name	Photo	Decorations	Reference
Additional Director General; Medical Services (Navy)	Surgeon Rear Admiral	Ajit Gopinath		VSM	
Command Medical Officer; Western Naval Command	Surgeon Rear Admiral	Samir Kapoor		VSM	
Command Medical Officer; Eastern Naval Command	Surgeon Rear Admiral	Jandhyala Sridhar			
Command Medical Officer; Southern Naval Command	Surgeon Rear Admiral	M Ilankumaran			
Commanding Officer, INHS Asvini	Surgeon Rear Admiral	Rohit Sharma			

== See also ==
- List of serving generals of the Indian Army
- List of serving marshals of the Indian Air Force
