= Flag Officer Commanding Maharashtra Naval Area =

Area Commander of the Indian Navy

Flag Officer Commanding Maharashtra Naval Area (FOMA)
- Flag of the FOMA (Rear Admiral's flag)

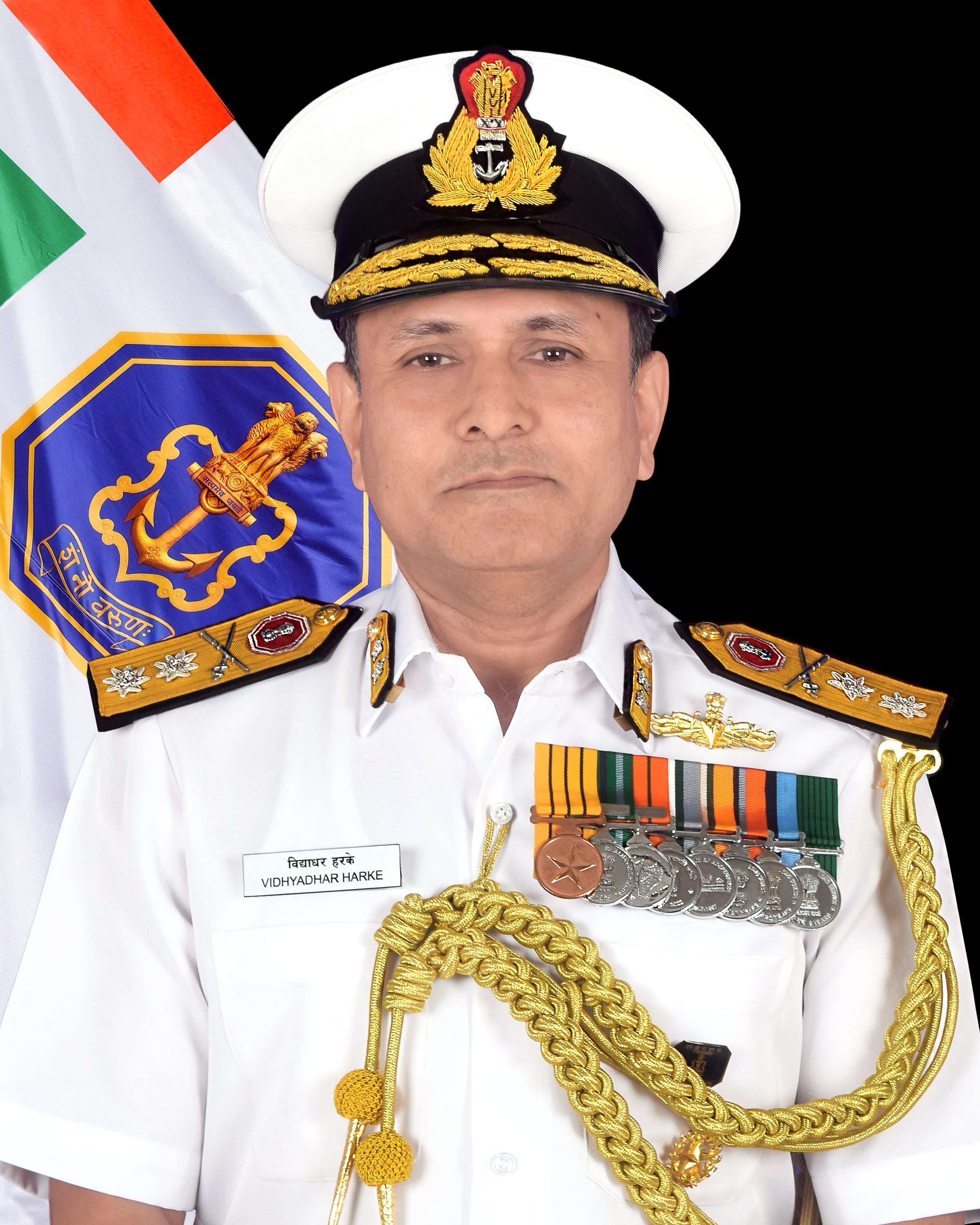
- Incumbent; Rear Admiral Vidhyadhar Harke VSM since 1 August 2026
- Indian Navy
- Abbreviation: FOMA
- Reports to: Flag Officer Commanding-in-Chief Western Naval Command
- Seat: Mumbai
- First holder: Rear Admiral S. W. Lakhkar, NM, VSM

Flag Officer Commanding Maharashtra Naval Area (FOMA) is a senior appointment in the Indian Navy. One of the five Area Commanders of the Indian Navy, the FOMA is a two star admiral holding the rank of Rear Admiral. The FOMA has operational control of the flotilla and forces assigned for the local naval defence of all ports in Maharashtra and the 22nd Missile Vessel Squadron. Apart from this, the FOMA is responsible for the operations and administration of all units and establishments in Maharashtra. The current FOMA is Rear Admiral Vidhyadhar Harke, who assumed office on 1 August 2026.

== History ==
On 1 April 1985, the upgradation of the post of Naval Officer-in-Charge (NOIC) Bombay was approved. It was upgraded from the rank of Commodore to Rear Admiral and re-designated Flag Officer Bombay. The implementation of this happened in March 1987 and the appointment was designated Flag Officer Maharashtra (FOMA). The FOMA would have operational control of all forces assigned for the local naval defence of all ports in Maharashtra, and would be responsible for the administration of all establishments and units in Bombay.

In 1993, FOMA was operationalised and proceeded to sea in a flotilla of minor ships. The 22nd missile vessel squadron commanded by K22 was also brought under the FOMA. In 2008, the Maharashtra Naval Area was expanded to include Gujarat, Daman and Diu. The Flag Officer Commanding Maharashtra and Gujarat Naval Area (FOMAG) headed the combined Naval area.

After a brief period, in 2015, to enhance the operational and administrative efficiency, the Maharashtra and Gujarat Naval Area was divided to make two separate headquarters under (FOMA) and the Flag Officer Commanding Gujarat Naval Area (FOGNA). The last Flag Officer Commanding Maharashtra and Gujarat Naval Area, Rear Admiral Murlidhar Sadashiv Pawar handed over command of the Maharashtra Area to Rear Admiral S. N. Ghormade.

== Organisation ==
The FOMA is assisted by the NOIC (Maharashtra) and the Chief Staff Officer at Headquarters Gujarat Naval Area (HQMNA), both one-star appointments. The FOMA reports to the Flag Officer Commanding-in-Chief Western Naval Command. The establishments under the FOMA include:

- Headquarters Maharashtra Naval Area (HQMNA)
- 22nd Missile Vessel Squadron (Killer squadron)
- The naval base INS Angre
- The missile battery base INS Trata
- The naval base INS Agnibahu
- Sagar Prahari Bal, Mumbai

== List of Commanders ==
S.No.	Name	Assumed office	Left office	Notes
Flag Officer Commanding Maharashtra Naval Area (FOMA)
1	Rear Admiral S. W. Lakhkar NM, VSM	23 March 1987	9 June 1987	First FOMA. Later Director General of the Indian Coast Guard.
2	Rear Admiral Vijai Singh Shekhawat AVSM, VrC	9 June 1987	8 August 1988	Later Chief of the Naval Staff.
3	Rear Admiral P. A. Debrass AVSM, NM	8 August 1988	17 October 1989	
4	Rear Admiral Sushil Kumar UYSM, NM	17 October 1989	24 July 1991	Later Chief of the Naval Staff.
5	Rear Admiral V. K. Malhotra VSM	24 July 1991	25 October 1992	
6	Rear Admiral Vinod Pasricha NM	25 October 1992	23 December 1993	Later Commandant of the National Defence College and Flag Officer Commanding-in-Chief Western Naval Command.
7	Rear Admiral Gupteshwar Rai AVSM, NM, VSM	23 December 1993	31 July 1995	First Flag Officer Sea Training.
8	Rear Admiral Raman Puri AVSM, VSM	31 July 1995	15 October 1997	Later Chief of Integrated Defence Staff.
9	Rear Admiral S. C. S. Bangara AVSM	15 October 1997	21 October 1998	Later Flag Officer Commanding-in-Chief Southern Naval Command.
10	Rear Admiral Ajit Tewari AVSM, NM	21 October 1998	26 April 2000	Later Chairman & Managing Director Hindustan Shipyard.
11	Rear Admiral Ravi Chander Kochhar AVSM, NM, VSM	26 April 2000	26 February 2002	As FOMA, headed the IFR cell during the Internal Fleet Review 2001.
12	Rear Admiral Nirmal Kumar Verma AVSM	26 February 2002	28 November 2003	Later Chief of the Naval Staff.
13	Rear Admiral Mahendra Pratap Taneja AVSM, NM, VSM	28 November 2003	23 May 2005	
14	Rear Admiral I. K. Saluja AVSM, VSM	24 May 2005	20 March 2006	
15	Rear Admiral D. K. Dewan AVSM	20 March 2006	17 March 2007	Later Vice Chief of the Naval Staff.
16	Rear Admiral A. V. Kalaskar NM, VSM	17 March 2007	24 January 2008	
17	Rear Admiral M. P. Muralidharan NM	24 January 2008	30 August 2008	Later Director General of the Indian Coast Guard.
Flag Officer Commanding Maharashtra and Gujarat Naval Area (FOMAG)
18	Rear Admiral M. P. Muralidharan NM	1 September 2008	8 December 2008	Later Director General of the Indian Coast Guard.
19	Rear Admiral Pradeep Kumar Chatterjee NM	8 December 2008	31 August 2009	Later Commander-in-Chief, Andaman and Nicobar Command.
20	Rear Admiral Sunil Lanba	31 August 2009	25 January 2011	Later Chief of the Naval Staff.
21	Rear Admiral Bimal Verma AVSM	25 January 2011	31 May 2012	Later Commander-in-Chief, Andaman and Nicobar Command.
22	Rear Admiral Karambir Singh AVSM	31 May 2012	19 August 2013	Later Chief of the Naval Staff.
23	Rear Admiral G. Ashok Kumar VSM	19 August 2013	7 November 2014	Later Vice Chief of the Naval Staff.
24	Rear Admiral Murlidhar Sadashiv Pawar VSM	7 November 2014	21 October 2015	Later Deputy Chief of the Naval Staff.
Flag Officer Commanding Maharashtra Naval Area (FOMA)
25	Rear Admiral Satishkumar Namdeo Ghormade NM	21 October 2015	17 October 2016	Later Vice Chief of the Naval Staff.
26	Rear Admiral Sanjay Mahindru NM	17 October 2016	12 February 2018	Later Deputy Chief of the Naval Staff.
27	Rear Admiral Puneet Kumar Bahl VSM	12 February 2018	25 March 2019	Later Commandant of Indian Naval Academy.
28	Rear Admiral Rajesh Pendharkar AVSM, VSM	12 February 2018	8 February 2020	Later Flag Officer Commanding-in-Chief Eastern Naval Command.
29	Rear Admiral Vennam Srinivas AVSM, VSM	8 February 2020	22 February 2021	Later Flag Officer Commanding-in-Chief Southern Naval Command.
30	Rear Admiral Atul Anand VSM	22 February 2021	16 December 2021	Current Additional secretary, Department of Military Affairs.
31	Rear Admiral Sandeep Mehta VSM	16 December 2021	18 November 2022	
32	Rear Admiral A. N. Pramod	18 November 2022	10 November 2023	Current Deputy Chief of the Naval Staff.
33	Rear Admiral Manish Chadha VSM	10 November 2023	1 September 2024	Current Commandant of Indian Naval Academy.
34	Rear Admiral Anil Jaggi	1 September 2024	17 October 2025	Current Commandant of the National Defence Academy.
35	Rear Admiral Shantanu Jha NM	17 October 2025	31 July 2026	
36	Rear Admiral Vidhyadhar Harke VSM	1 August 2026	Present	Current FOMA.

== See also ==
- INS Angre

== Bibliography ==
- Hiranandani, Gulab Mohanlal (2005), Transition to eminence : the Indian navy 1976-1990, Lancer Publishers, ISBN 978-8170622666
- Hiranandani, Gulab Mohanlal (2009), Transition to Guardianship: The Indian Navy, 1991–2000, Lancer Publishers LLC, ISBN 978-1-935501-66-4
- Doraibabu, M; Godbole, Amrut (2023), A Decade of Transformation: The Indian Navy 2011-2021, Harper Collins Publishers India, ISBN 9789394407909
- Cardozo, Major General Ian (2006), The Sinking Of INS Khukri, Roli Books, ISBN 978-9351941262
