= INS Sardar Patel =

Naval Base in Gujarat, India

- Part of Naval Station, Porbandar
- Porbandar, Gujarat

Site information
- Type: Naval base
- Controlled by: Indian Navy
- Open to the public: No
- Condition: Active

Location
- Coordinates: 21.674633°N 69.605849°E

Site history
- Built: 9 May 2015
- In use: 2015–present

Garrison information
- Occupants: Western Naval Command

INS Sardar Patel is a naval base of the Indian Navy in Porbandar, Gujarat and the Station Headquarters of Naval Station, Porbandar. It provides the logistic support to the Indian Navy units deployed in the Northern Arabian Sea, including along the International Maritime Boundary Line with Pakistan. Along with Naval Air Enclave (NAE) Porbandar, it can support the operations of ships, submarines and aircraft of Western Naval Command.

== History ==
INS Sardar Patel is the second naval base in Gujarat after INS Dwarka, which is near Okha. The name Sardar Patel has been chosen to signify the role of India’s Iron Man Vallabhai Patel, the first Deputy Prime Minister and Home Minister of India.

The base was commissioned on 9 May 2015 by Anandiben Patel, the then Chief Minister of Gujarat. The commissioning ceremony was attended by Admiral RK Dhowan, Chief of the Naval Staff, Vice Admiral SPS Cheema, Flag Officer Commanding–in–Chief, Western Naval Command, senior naval officers and other dignitaries of the state government. Indian Navy's destroyers INS Delhi (D61) and INS Kolkata (D63) were also present.

Commodore BR Prakash, VSM who is the Naval Officer-in-Charge (Gujarat) is the first Commanding Officer of INS Sardar Patel.

== Objective ==
After the 26/11 terror attack on Mumbai, the Indian Navy was entrusted the responsibility of a lead agency to coordinate coastal and offshore security requirements and also augment naval presence in sensitive areas.

Gujarat is a front line maritime state of India with the longest coastline of 880 nautical miles, besides sharing 532 km of land border with Pakistan. Over the preceding decade, there has been a significant growth in the maritime infrastructure along the coast of Gujarat. Many ports have come up along the coastline, which collectively handle 300 million tons of cargo annually, constituting approximately 30 per cent of the total cargo handled in the ports of India.

In addition, there are 12 single point moorings (SPMs) in the Gulf of Kutch, through which about 120 million tons of crude oil is supplied to various refineries on the coast and in the hinterland, constituting 71 per cent of the oil import into the country. The creation of considerable infrastructure along the coastline makes them vulnerable from sea, not only during hostilities but also during peacetime.

The commissioning of INS Sardar Patel at Porbandar enables the Navy to augment its infrastructure and organisational effectiveness in Gujarat. It will improve coordination and synergy with other maritime agencies.

== See also ==
Indian navy

- List of Indian Navy bases
- List of active Indian Navy ships

Integrated commands and units

- Armed Forces Special Operations Division
- Defence Cyber Agency
- Integrated Defence Staff
- Integrated Space Cell
- Indian Nuclear Command Authority
- Indian Armed Forces
- Special Forces of India

Other lists

- Strategic Forces Command
- List of Indian Air Force stations
- List of Indian Navy bases
- India's overseas military bases
