= Sameer Saxena =

Sameer Saxena may refer to:

- Sameer Saxena (filmmaker)
- Sameer Saxena (admiral)
