= Atul Anand =

Indian Navy admiral

Vice Admiral Atul Anand PVSM, AVSM, VSM
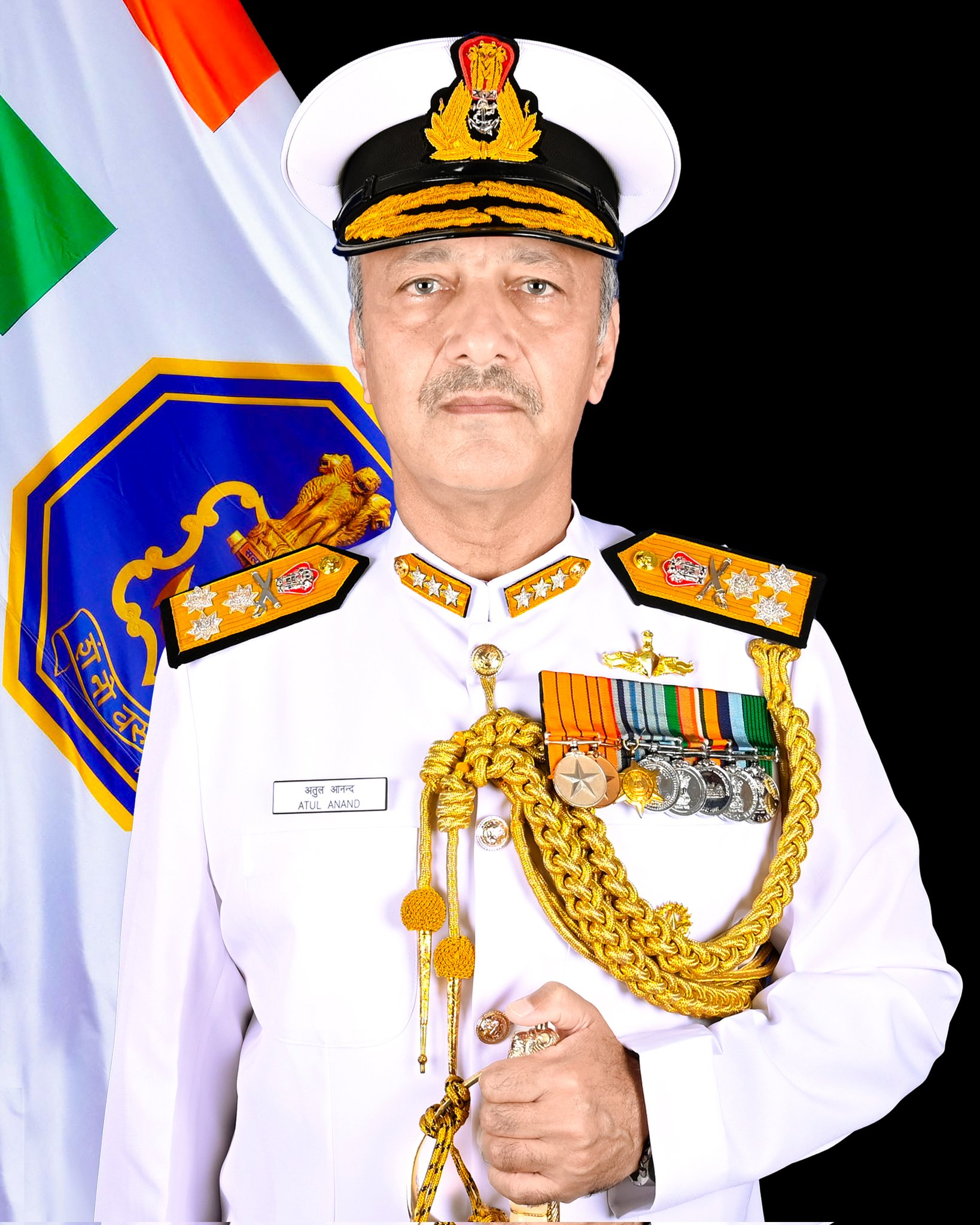
- Education: Indian Naval Academy
- Military career
- Allegiance: India
- Branch: Indian Navy
- Service years: 1 January 1988 – 31 August 2026
- Rank: Vice admiral
- Service number: 03247-B
- Commands: Karnataka Naval Area; Maharashtra Naval Area; INS Mumbai (D62); INS Khukri (P49); INS Chatak (K96); Torpedo recovery vessel A72
- Awards: Param Vishisht Seva Medal; Ati Vishisht Seva Medal; Vishisht Seva Medal

Vice Admiral Atul Anand, PVSM, AVSM, VSM is a retired Indian Navy officer. He last served as the additional secretary to the Government of India at the Department of Military Affairs in Ministry of Defence. He earlier served as the director general naval operations, as flag officer commanding Karnataka Naval Area, as flag officer commanding Maharashtra Naval Area and as the deputy commandant and chief instructor of the National Defence Academy.

== Early life and education ==
Anand was born in an armed forces family. His father attended the National Defence Academy (NDA) as part of the 13th course. Anand also attended the NDA, as part of the 71st course.

== Naval career ==
Anand was commissioned into the Indian Navy on 1 January 1988. He is a specialist in navigation and direction. He spent his early years as the navigating officer of INS Sharda (P55), INS Ranvijay (D55) and INS Jyoti (A58). He also was the direction officer of the Sea Harrier Squadron INAS 300. He attended the Defence Services Command and Staff College in Dhaka, Bangladesh. He served as the joint director staff requirements at Naval headquarters.

Anand commanded the Astravahini-class torpedo recovery vessel A72, the Chamak-class missile boat INS Chatak (K96) and the lead ship of her class of corvettes, INS Khukri (P49). He served as the executive officer and the principal warfare officer of the lead ship of her class of guided missile destroyers INS Delhi (D61). He then commanded Delhi's sister ship INS Mumbai (D62). In the rank of captain, he served as directing staff at the Defence Services Staff College, Wellington Cantonment. At NHQ, he served as the director naval operations and as the director naval intelligence (ops). He also attended the Advance Security Cooperation Course at the Asia-Pacific Center for Security Studies in Hawaii, US.

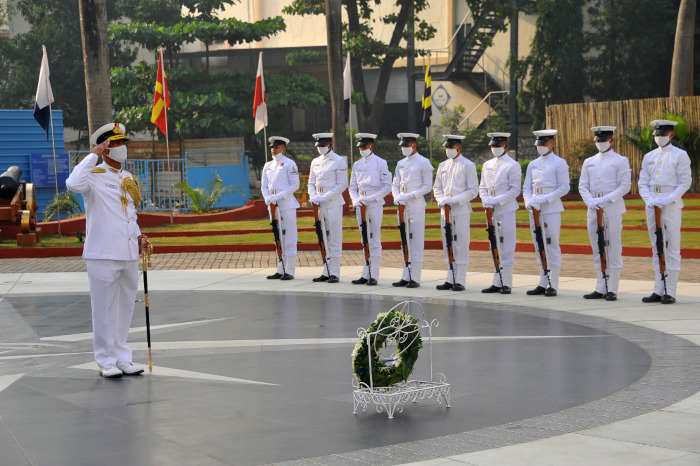
Anand, as FOMA, laying a wreath at the Gaurav Stambh in Naval Dockyard (Mumbai) on the occasion of Vijay Diwas.

As a commodore, in 2013, Anand attended the National Defence College as part of the 53rd course. He then served as the principal director naval operations and as the principal director strategy, concepts and transformation, both at NHQ. In January 2015, he was awarded the Vishisht Seva Medal for distinguished service.

=== Flag rank ===
Anand was promoted to flag rank and was appointed assistant chief of naval staff (Foreign Cooperation and Intelligence) at Naval headquarters. In June 2020, he moved to Pune and took over as the deputy commandant and chief instructor of his alma-mater, National Defence Academy. After an eight-month stint, he was appointed flag officer commanding Maharashtra Naval Area (FOMA) in February 2021. He took over from Rear Admiral Vennam Srinivas on 22 February 2021. For his tenure as FOMA, he was awarded the Ati Vishisht Seva Medal on 26 January 2022. After a short tenure as FOMA, he moved to Karwar as the flag officer commanding Karnataka Naval Area, taking over on 20 December 2021. On 1 April 2023, Anand was promoted to the rank of vice admiral and appointed director general naval operations (DGNO) at naval headquarters, succeeding Vice Admiral Rajesh Pendharkar. After a short stint as DGNO, he was appointed additional secretary of the Department of Military Affairs, headed by the chief of the defence staff General Anil Chauhan. He was awarded the Param Vishisht Seva Medal on 26 January 2026.

== Awards and decorations ==

Param Vishisht Seva Medal	Ati Vishisht Seva Medal	Vishisht Seva Medal	Samanya Seva Medal
Operation Vijay Star	Operation Vijay Medal	Operation Parakram Medal	Sainya Seva Medal
75th Independence Anniversary Medal	50th Independence Anniversary Medal		30 Years Long Service Medal
	20 Years Long Service Medal	9 Years Long Service Medal	

Military offices
Preceded by Vennam Srinivas	Flag Officer Commanding Maharashtra Naval Area; 2021 – 2021	Succeeded by Sandeep Mehta
Preceded by Mahesh Singh	Flag Officer Commanding Karnataka Naval Area; 2021 – 2023	Succeeded by K. M. Ramakrishnan
Preceded by Rajesh Pendharkar	Director General Naval Operations; 2023 – 2023	Succeeded by A. N. Pramod
