= Flag Officer Commanding Gujarat Naval Area =

Flag Officer Commanding Gujarat Naval Area (FOGNA)
- Flag of the FOGNA (Rear Admiral's flag)
- Incumbent; Rear Admiral Sritanu Guru since 1 November 2025
- Indian Navy
- Abbreviation: FOGNA
- Member of: Indian Navy
- Reports to: Flag Officer Commanding-in-Chief Western Naval Command
- Residence: Flag House Porbandar
- Seat: Porbandar
- Appointer: Government of India
- First holder: Rear Admiral Murlidhar Sadashiv Pawar

Flag Officer Commanding Gujarat, Daman & Diu Naval Area (FOGNA) is a senior appointment in the Indian Navy. One of the five Area Commanders of the Indian Navy, the FOGNA is a two star admiral holding the rank of Rear Admiral. The FOGNA is responsible for the operations and administration of all units and establishments in Gujarat and Dadra and Nagar Haveli and Daman and Diu. The Current FOGNA is Rear Admiral Sritanu Guru, who assumed office on 1 November 2025.

== History ==
In 1966, the appointment of Naval Officer-in-Charge (NOIC) Kathiawar was created. A small forward outpost was created at Okha, under the NOIC. Initially, the NOIC was based out of Mumbai, later moving to Okha. In late 1972, the establishment was commissioned as INS Dwarka, with the NOIC (Kathiawar) as the commanding officer. In 1983, NOIC (Kathiawar) was re-designated as NOIC (Saurashtra), and moved to Dwarka II in Porbandar in 1985. NOIC (Saurashtra) was again later re-designated as NOIC (Gujarat) in 1997.

In the 1980s, a proposal to upgrade NOIC to Flag Officer Saurashtra Area (FOSA) was mooted but shelved. For a brief period, the Maharashtra Naval Area was expanded to include Gujarat, Daman and Diu. The Flag Officer Commanding Maharashtra and Gujarat Naval Area headed the combined Naval area. In 2015, to enhance the operational and administrative efficiency, the Maharashtra and Gujarat Naval Area was divided to make two separate headquarters under Flag Officer Commanding Maharashtra Naval Area (FOMA) and Flag Officer Commanding Gujarat Naval Area (FOGNA).

The last Flag Officer Commanding Maharashtra and Gujarat Naval Area, Rear Admiral Murlidhar Sadashiv Pawar handed over command of the Maharashtra Area to Rear Admiral S. N. Ghormade and officiated as the first Flag Officer Gujarat Naval Area.

== Organisation ==
The FOGNA is assisted by the NOIC (Gujarat), a one-star appointment. The NOIC (Guj) also serves as the Chief Staff Officer at Headquarters Gujarat Naval Area (HQGNA). The FOGNA is responsible to the Flag Officer Commanding-in-Chief Western Naval Command for the operations and administration of all units and establishments in Gujarat and Dadra and Nagar Haveli and Daman and Diu. The establishments under the FOGNA include:

- Headquarters Gujarat Naval Area (HQGNA)
- The Forward operating base INS Dwarka
- The naval base INS Sardar Patel
- Naval Air Enclave, Porbandar
- The naval air squadron INAS 343
- The naval air squadron INAS 314
- Sagar Prahari Bal, Porbandar

== List of Commanders ==
S.No.	Name	Assumed office	Left office	Notes
1	Rear Admiral Murlidhar Sadashiv Pawar VSM	21 October 2015	30 March 2016	First FOGNA. Later Deputy Chief of the Naval Staff.
2	Rear Admiral Sandeep Beecha	30 March 2016	27 November 2017	Later Commandant Naval War College, Goa.
3	Rear Admiral Sanjay Roye VSM	27 November 2017	10 February 2020	
4	Rear Admiral Puruvir Das NM	10 February 2020	6 December 2021	Later Chief Instructor (Navy) at Defence Services Staff College, Wellington.
5	Rear Admiral Manish Chadha VSM	6 December 2021	29 November 2022	Current Commandant of Indian Naval Academy.
6	Rear Admiral Sameer Saxena AVSM, NM	29 November 2022	31 July 2023	Current Flag Officer Commanding-in-Chief Southern Naval Command.
7	Rear Admiral Anil Jaggi	1 August 2023	24 August 2024	Current Commandant of the National Defence Academy.
8	Rear Admiral Sathish Vasudev NM	24 August 2024	31 October 2025	Current CSO (Ops), Western Naval Command.
9	Rear Admiral Sritanu Guru	1 November 2025	Present	Current FOGNA.

== See also ==
- INS Dwarka
- INS Sardar Patel

== Bibliography ==
- Hiranandani, G M (2005), Transition to eminence : the Indian navy 1976-1990, Lancer Publishers, ISBN 978-8170622666
- Doraibabu, M; Godbole, Amrut (2023), A Decade of Transformation: The Indian Navy 2011-2021, Harper Collins Publishers India, ISBN 9789394407909
