= Manish Chadha =

Indian Navy admiral

Vice Admiral Manish Chadha AVSM, VSM
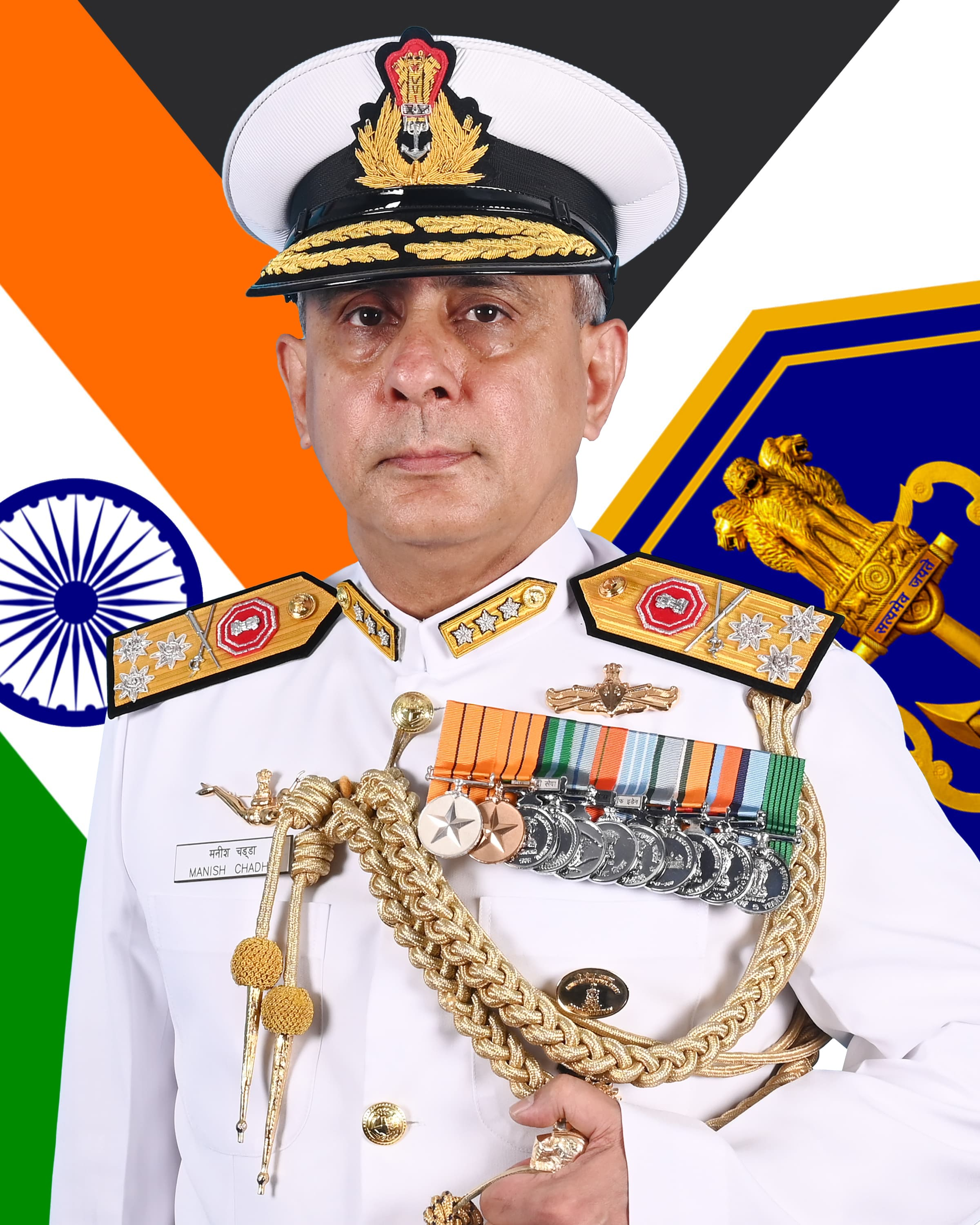
- Military career
- Allegiance: India
- Branch: Indian Navy
- Service years: 1 July 1991 – present
- Rank: Vice Admiral
- Commands: Indian Naval Academy; Maharashtra Naval Area; Gujarat Naval Area; INS Mysore (D60); INS Kirpan (P44); INS Veer (K40); ICGS-05
- Awards: Ati Vishisht Seva Medal; Vishisht Seva Medal

Vice Admiral Manish Chadha, AVSM, VSM is a serving flag officer in the Indian Navy. He currently serves as the Director General Naval Operations. He earlier served as the Commandant of Indian Naval Academy, as the Flag Officer Commanding Maharashtra Naval Area, as the Flag Officer Commanding Gujarat Naval Area and as the Naval attaché in Moscow.

== Naval career ==
Chadha attended the National Defence Academy and was commissioned into the Indian Navy on 1 July 1991. He specialized in Communication and Electronic Warfare. He attended the Defence Services Staff College, Wellington and completed the Higher Command Course from the National Defense University in Washington, D.C.

In his staff appointments, Chadha has served in the Directorate of Naval Signals as the Director Project Amber (VLF) and Rukmani (naval communication satellite). He later served as Director of the International Fleet Review 2016, a President's fleet review held in Visakhapatnam at an International level.

Chadha commanded the Indian Coast Guard interceptor boat ICGS-05, the lead ship of her class of missile corvettes INS Veer (K40) and the Khukri-class corvette INS Kirpan (P44). He served as the executive officer of the lead ship of her class of stealth guided missile frigates INS Talwar (F40). He then commanded the Delhi-class guided missile destroyer INS Mysore (D60). In the rank of Commodore, he served as the Naval attaché to the Ambassador of India to Russia at the Embassy of India in Moscow.

=== Flag rank ===
Chadha was promoted to flag rank on 6 December 2021 and was appointed the fifth Flag Officer Commanding Gujarat Naval Area (FOGNA). As FOGNA, he was responsible for the operations and administration of all units and establishments in Gujarat and Dadra and Nagar Haveli and Daman and Diu. After a year-long tenure, Chadha relinquished charge, handing over to Rear Admiral Sameer Saxena on 29 November 2022. He then moved to Naval headquarters as the Assistant Chief of Personnel (Administration and Civilian). The ACOP is an assistant principal staff officer position at NHQ.

On 10 November 2023, Chadha took over as the Flag Officer Commanding Maharashtra Naval Area from Rear Admiral A. N. Pramod at INS Kunjali. After a year-long tenure, he handed over to Rear Admiral Anil Jaggi and moved to NHQ as the Assistant Chief of Personnel (HRD). On 1 August 2025, he was promoted to the rank of Vice Admiral and appointed Commandant of Indian Naval Academy succeeding Vice Admiral C. R. Praveen Nair. A year later, on 3 August 2026, he assumed charge as the Director General Naval Operations from Vice Admiral A. N. Pramod.

== Awards and decorations ==
Chadha was awarded the Vishisht Seva Medal in 2017 and the Ati Vishisht Seva Medal in 2025.

Ati Vishisht Seva Medal	Vishisht Seva Medal	Samanya Seva Medal	Operation Vijay Medal
Sainya Seva Medal	Videsh Seva Medal	75th Independence Anniversary Medal	50th Independence Anniversary Medal
30 Years Long Service Medal	20 Years Long Service Medal		9 Years Long Service Medal

Military offices
Preceded by Puruvir Das	Flag Officer Commanding Gujarat Naval Area; 2021 – 2022	Succeeded by Sameer Saxena
Preceded by A. N. Pramod	Flag Officer Commanding Maharashtra Naval Area; 2023 – 2024	Succeeded by Anil Jaggi
Preceded by C. R. Praveen Nair	Commandant of Indian Naval Academy; 2025 - 2026	Succeeded by Alok Ananda
Preceded by A. N. Pramod	Director General Naval Operations; 2026 - Present	Incumbent
