= Vidhyadhar Harke =

Indian Navy Admiral

Rear Admiral Vidhyadhar Harker VSM
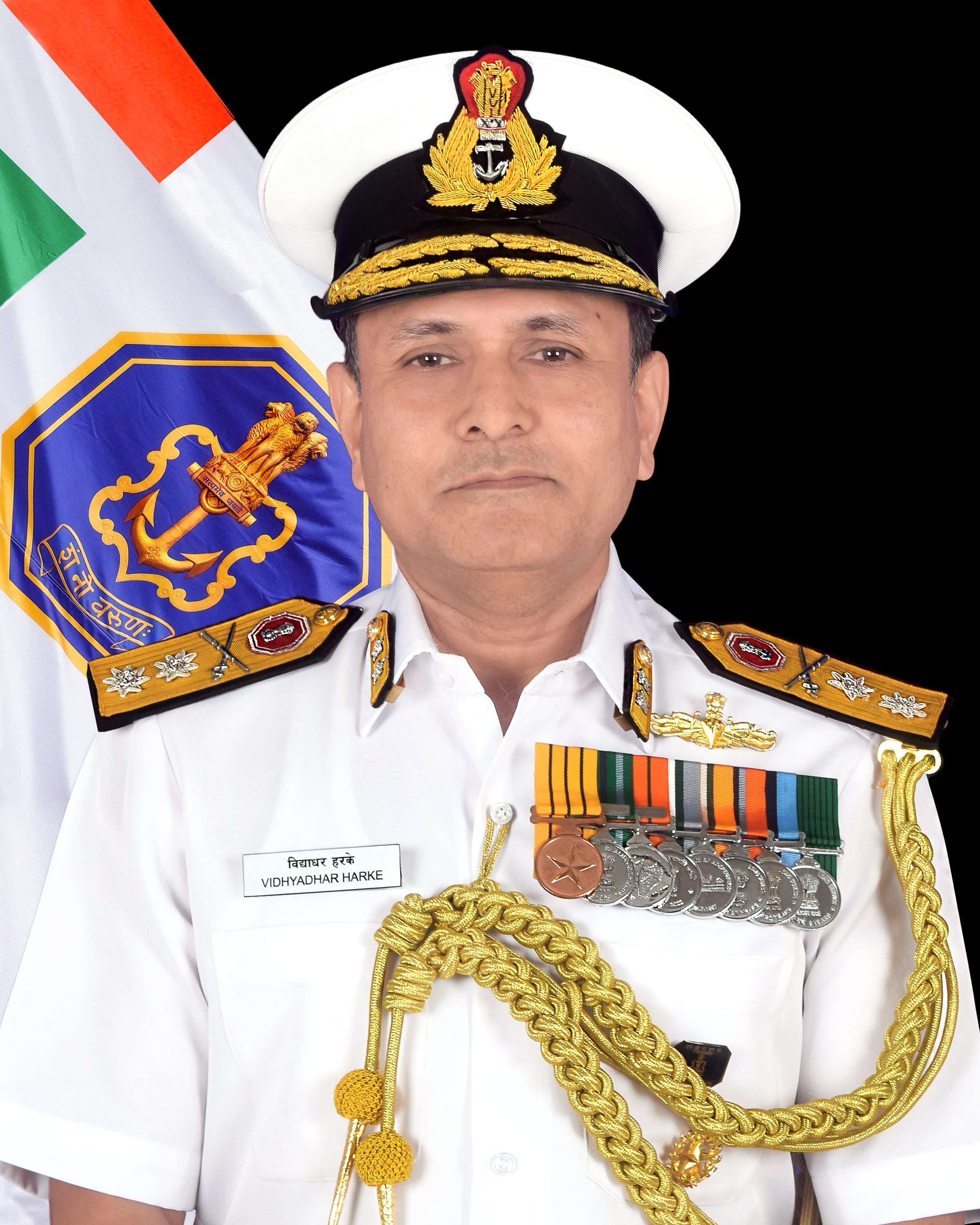
- Military career
- Allegiance: India
- Branch: Indian Navy
- Service years: 1993 – present
- Rank: Rear Admiral
- Commands: Maharashtra Naval Area; INS Vikrant (R11); INS Jalashwa (L41)

Rear Admiral Vidhyadhar Harke, VSM is a serving flag officer in the Indian Navy. He currently serves as the flag officer commanding Maharashtra Naval Area. He was the commissioning commanding officer of India's first indigenous aircraft carrier, INS Vikrant (R11).

== Early life and education ==
Harke was born in Bhingar, in Ahilyanagar district. The family later moved to Pune. After his schooling, he joined the National Defence Academy, Khadakwasla.

== Naval career ==
Harke was commissioned into the Indian Navy on 1 July 1993. He specialised in anti-submarine warfare. He attended the Defence Services Staff College, Wellington. He also served in the Directorate of Staff Requirements at Naval headquarters.

As a captain, Harke attended the Naval Higher Command Course at the Naval War College, Goa. In the same rank, he commanded the Navy's only amphibious transport dock, INS Jalashwa (L41). Promoted to the rank of commodore, Harke was appointed fleet operations officer of the Eastern Fleet.

In 2021, Harke was appointed the commanding officer (designate) of India's first indigenous aircraft carrier, INS Vikrant (R11). He led the ship through her maiden sea trials in August that year, followed by four phases of sea trials. In July 2022, he took delivery of the aircraft carrier on behalf of the Navy from the shipbuilder, Cochin Shipyard Limited.

On 2 September 2022, Harke commissioned INS Vikrant (R11) in the presence of the prime minister Narendra Modi at Kochi. With this, India joined a select group of nations having the capability to indigenously design and build an aircraft carrier. Later that year, Harke worked up the ship, undertaking extensive air operations with rotary and fixed wing aircraft. The first landings of LCA (Navy) and MiG-29K aircraft took place in February 2023 while the night landing operations were conducted in May.

=== Flag rank ===
Harke was promoted to flag rank in January 2024 and was appointed chief staff officer (operations) of the Western Naval Command. He served in this appointment during Operation Sindoor and oversaw multiple operational deployments and missions. On 22 November 2025, he took over as the 27th Flag Officer Sea Training, from Rear Admiral Srinivas Maddula. The FOST functions under the operational and administrative jurisdiction of Flag Officer Commanding-in-Chief Southern Naval Command. As FOST, his charter included the conduct of the operational sea training of all ships and submarines of the Indian Navy and the Indian Coast Guard. It includes enhancing crew proficiency in all aspects, including safe navigation practices, damage control and firefighting drills, weapon firings as well as seamanship training.

After a short stint as FOST, Harke was appointed flag officer commanding Maharashtra Naval Area (FOMA). He took over from Rear Admiral Shantanu Jha on 31 July 2026.

== Awards and decorations ==
Harke was awarded the Vishisht Seva Medal in 2022.

Vishisht Seva Medal	Samanya Seva Medal	Sainya Seva Medal	75th Independence Anniversary Medal
50th Independence Anniversary Medal	30 Years Long Service Medal	20 Years Long Service Medal	9 Years Long Service Medal

Military offices
New title Ship commissioned	Commanding Officer INS Vikrant; 2021 – 2023	Succeeded by Birendra Singh Bains
Preceded by Srinivas Maddula	Flag Officer Sea Training; 2025 – 2026	Succeeded by
Preceded by Shantanu Jha	Flag Officer Commanding Maharashtra Naval Area; 2026 – Present	Incumbent
