= INS Agnibahu =

Naval Base Depot Establishment

INS Agnibahu
- Naval Dockyard, Mumbai in India
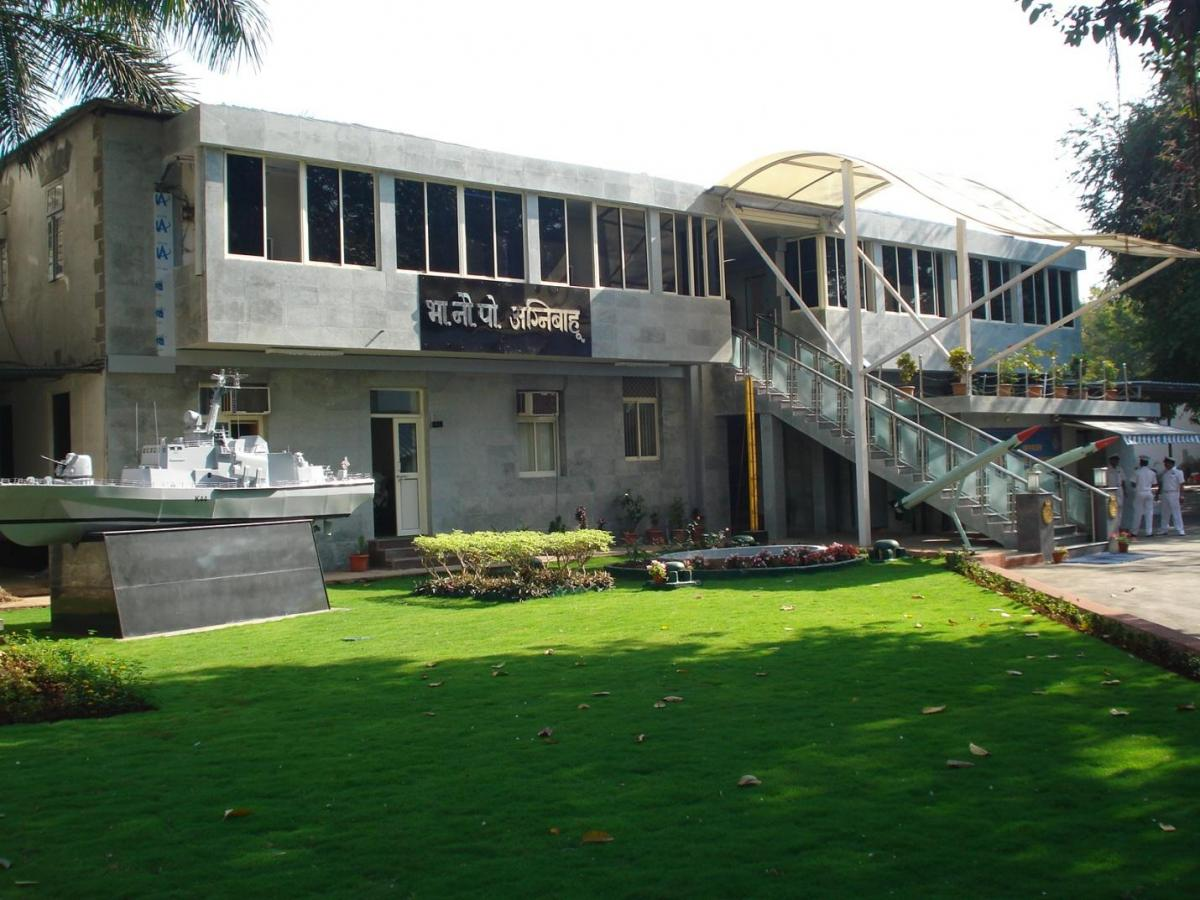
- INS Agnibahu

Site information
- Type: Naval shore establishment
- Owner: Ministry of Defence
- Operator: Indian Navy
- Condition: Operational

Site history
- In use: 1973 – present

Garrison information
- Occupants: 22nd Missile Vessel Squadron

INS Agnibahu is a "stone frigate" (shore establishment) of the Indian Navy in Mumbai. It is the administrative and logistic base for the 22nd Missile Vessel Squadron.

== History ==
INS Agnibahu was commissioned on 8 January 1973 as the Tender ship for the 25th Missile Boat Squadron. The squadron had attacked Karachi successfully during the Indo-Pakistani War of 1971. The squadron commander was designated Captain K25 and served as the commanding officer of Agnibahu. It was initially located at Robert House in Colaba and was directly under the operational and administrative control of the Flag Officer Commanding-in-Chief Western Naval Command. On 23 March 1987, the Maharashtra Naval Area was created and the operational and administrative control of Agnibahu was transferred to the Flag Officer Commanding Maharashtra Naval Area (FOMA).

Starting 1987, the Veer-class corvettes were commissioned and the 22nd Missile Vessel Squadron was raised. Agnibahu served as the base for the older Osa-class missile boats as well as the new Veer-class corvettes. In 1991, the Osa-class boats moved to Visakhapatnam and Captain K25 was re-designated Captain K22.

== Today ==
INS Agnibahu has grown multifold in size and operational responsibility. It accommodates the office of Captain K22 and his staff, both sea-going as well as those based ashore. The Integrated Organisation consists of Agnibahu and the ships of the 22nd Missile Vessel Squadron. It provides accommodation for sailors on the Staff of K22, ships under refit and LWT (W) sailors and Waiting ships sailors (reporting ex-leave, transfer, temporary duty etc) and coordinating their movements. It also provides, training, medical support and logistics support to the ships of the squadron.

== Crest ==
Agnibahu means 'Arm of Fire’. The crest depicts a shower of Four arrows striking with lightning effect above Blue and White sea waves, against a Blue background.

== See also ==
- List of Indian Navy bases
- Stone frigate
