= A. N. Pramod =

Indian Navy Admiral

Vice Admiral A. N. Pramod AVSM, YSM
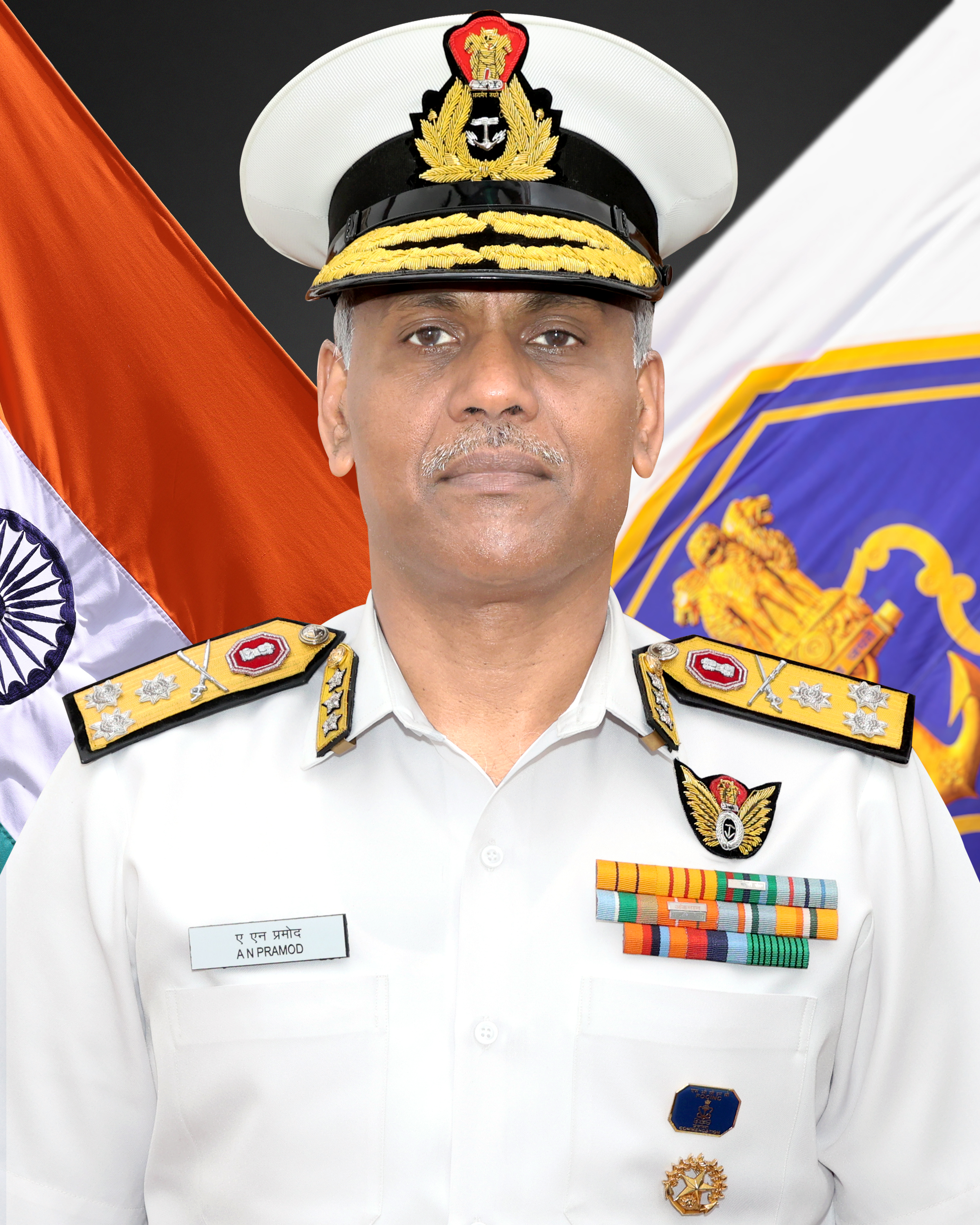
- Education: Indian Naval Academy
- Military career
- Allegiance: India
- Branch: Indian Navy
- Service years: July 1990 – present
- Rank: Vice Admiral
- Service number: 03579-H
- Commands: Maharashtra Naval Area; INS Utkrosh; INS Satpura (F48); INS Shardul (2004); INS Abhay (1989)
- Awards: Ati Vishisht Seva Medal; Yudh Seva Medal

Vice Admiral A. N. Pramod, AVSM, YSM is a serving flag officer in the Indian Navy. He currently serves as the Deputy Chief of the Naval Staff. He earlier served as the Director General Naval Operations during Operation Sindoor.

== Early life and education ==
Pramod attended the Naval Academy, Goa as part of the 38th Integrated Cadet Course.

== Naval career ==
Pramod was commissioned into the Indian Navy on 1 July 1990. He is a specialist in Communication and Electronic Warfare. He trained as a naval aviator and qualified as a Naval Air Operations Officer. He underwent the Sea King observer course where he qualified as a 'Cat A' observer. He was awarded the Flag Officer Commanding-in-Chief Eastern Naval Command Rolling Trophy for standing first in flying training/ground subjects and the Uttar Pradesh trophy for being first in the Overall Order of Merit.

Pramod stood second in the Long Communication Course. In his early years, he served as the Gunnery Officer II (GO II) of the Khukri-class corvette INS Kirpan (P44) and as the Signal and Communications officer (SCO) of the Sukanya-class patrol vessel INS Sujata (P56). He also attended the Defence Services Staff College, Wellington. He served as Joint Director of Naval Air Staff and as the Joint Director of Aircraft Acquisition at naval headquarters. He served as a member of the Tactical Audit Group from 2006 to 2009.

Pramod commanded the lead ship of her class of anti-submarine warfare corvettes INS Abhay and the lead ship of her class of Amphibious warfare vessels INS Shardul (2004). He served as the executive officer of the lead ship of her class of guided missile destroyers INS Rajput (D51). He then commanded the Shivalik-class stealth multi-role frigate INS Satpura (F48). He led Satpura during the International Fleet Review 2016. Under his command, Satpura was adjudged the Best Ship of the Eastern Fleet in 2016-17.

In the rank of Captain, he attended the Naval Higher Command Course at the Naval War College, Goa. He also served as Directing Staff at his alma-mater, the Defence Services Staff College, Wellington Cantonment. At NHQ, he served as the Director of Aircraft Acquisition. As a Commodore, Pramod commanded the Indian naval air station INS Utkrosh at Port Blair. He also served as the Fleet Operations Officer of the Western Fleet. He subsequently moved to NHQ having been appointed Principal Director of Aircraft Acquisition. He was a member of the Indian Naval Strategic and Operational Council from 2016 to 2019.

=== Flag rank ===
Pramod was promoted to flag rank in January 2021 and was appointed Deputy Commandant and Chief Instructor of the Indian Naval Academy on 11 January 2021. After a fourteen-month stint, on 1 April 2022, he moved to Naval headquarters as the Assistant Chief of Naval Staff (Air) (ACNS (Air)). In November that year, he was appointed Flag Officer Commanding Maharashtra Naval Area (FOMA). He took over from Rear Admiral Sandeep Mehta on 28 November 2022. After a year-long tenure, he relinquished charge and handed over to Rear Admiral Manish Chadha. For his tenure as FOMA, he was awarded the Ati Vishisht Seva Medal on 26 January 2024. In the same month, he was promoted to the rank of Vice Admiral and appointed Director General Naval Operations (DGNO) at NHQ. He served as the DGNO during Operation Sindoor, for which he was awarded the Yudh Seva Medal (YSM).

The citation for the YSM reads as follows:

CITATION

Rear Admiral A. N. Pramod, AVSM

Director General Naval Operations

As DGNO, he played a vital role in shaping of naval operations in Operation Sindoor. As the Primary Coordinator of Naval Operations, he articulated and realised the Naval action plan in accordance with the specified national objectives. In the face of rapidly deteriorating security situation with Pakistan post the Pahalgam attack, he formulated and executed the Indian response plan in coordination with Intelligence agencies. He assessed the combat readiness of the offensive and defensive Indian naval targeting platforms and vectors in consultation with the operational commands to ensure immediate material readiness of ships and submarines, readiness of MARCOS, on-site availability of ordnance, overnight combat loading of platforms and the rapid deployment while ensuring complete operational information security. He formulated an escalation matrix to meet all the higher directives to ensure a punitive response to the Pakistani forces.

His detailed planning, aggressive deployment of Indian Naval assets in North Arabian Sea and innovative utilisation of special operations streams compelled and restricted Pakistan Navy to remain close to the Pakistan coast.

For his exceptional professionalism, meticulous operational planning and single-minded devotion to duty to the nation, and service as Director General Naval Operations during Operation Sindoor, Vice Admiral AN Pramod, AVSM is awarded the Yudh Seva Medal.

On 1 August 2026, Pramod was appointed the Deputy Chief of the Naval Staff and took over from Vice Admiral Tarun Sobti.

== Personal life ==
Pramod is married to Ambili Pramod. The couple has a daughter, Chitranjali, and a son, Siddhanta.

== Awards and decorations ==
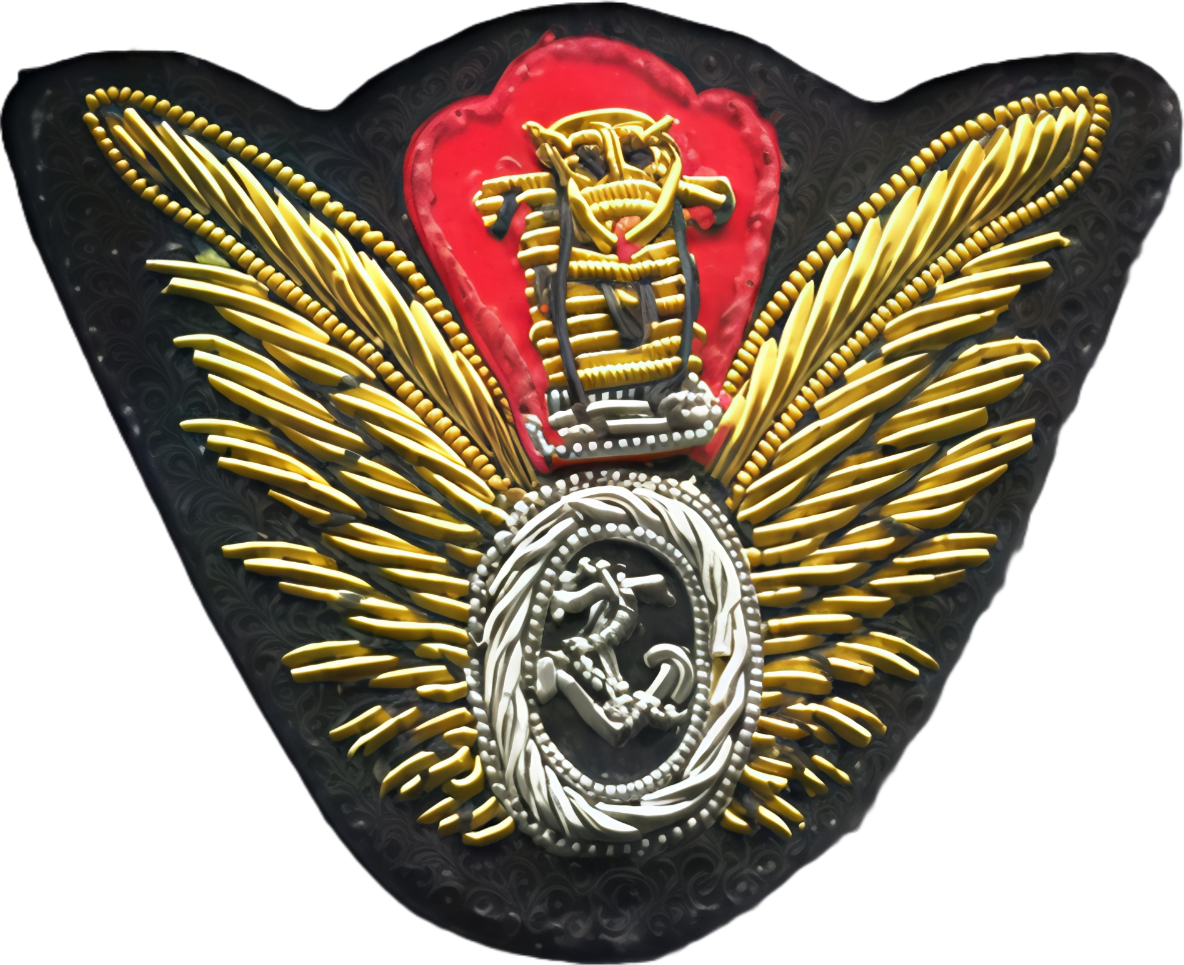

Observer (Navigator) Badge
Ati Vishisht Seva Medal	Yudh Seva Medal	Samanya Seva Medal	Operation Vijay Medal
Operation Parakram Medal	Sainya Seva Medal	75th Independence Anniversary Medal	50th Independence Anniversary Medal
30 Years Long Service Medal	20 Years Long Service Medal		9 Years Long Service Medal

Military offices
Preceded by Tarun Sobti	Deputy Commandant Indian Naval Academy; 2021 – 2022	Succeeded by Ajay D. Theophilus
Preceded by Sandeep Mehta	Flag Officer Commanding Maharashtra Naval Area; 2022 – 2023	Succeeded by Manish Chadha
Preceded by Atul Anand	Director General Naval Operations; 2024 – 2026	Succeeded by Manish Chadha
Preceded by Tarun Sobti	Deputy Chief of the Naval Staff; 2026 – Present	Incumbent
