= 22nd Missile Vessel Squadron =

Formation of the Indian Navy

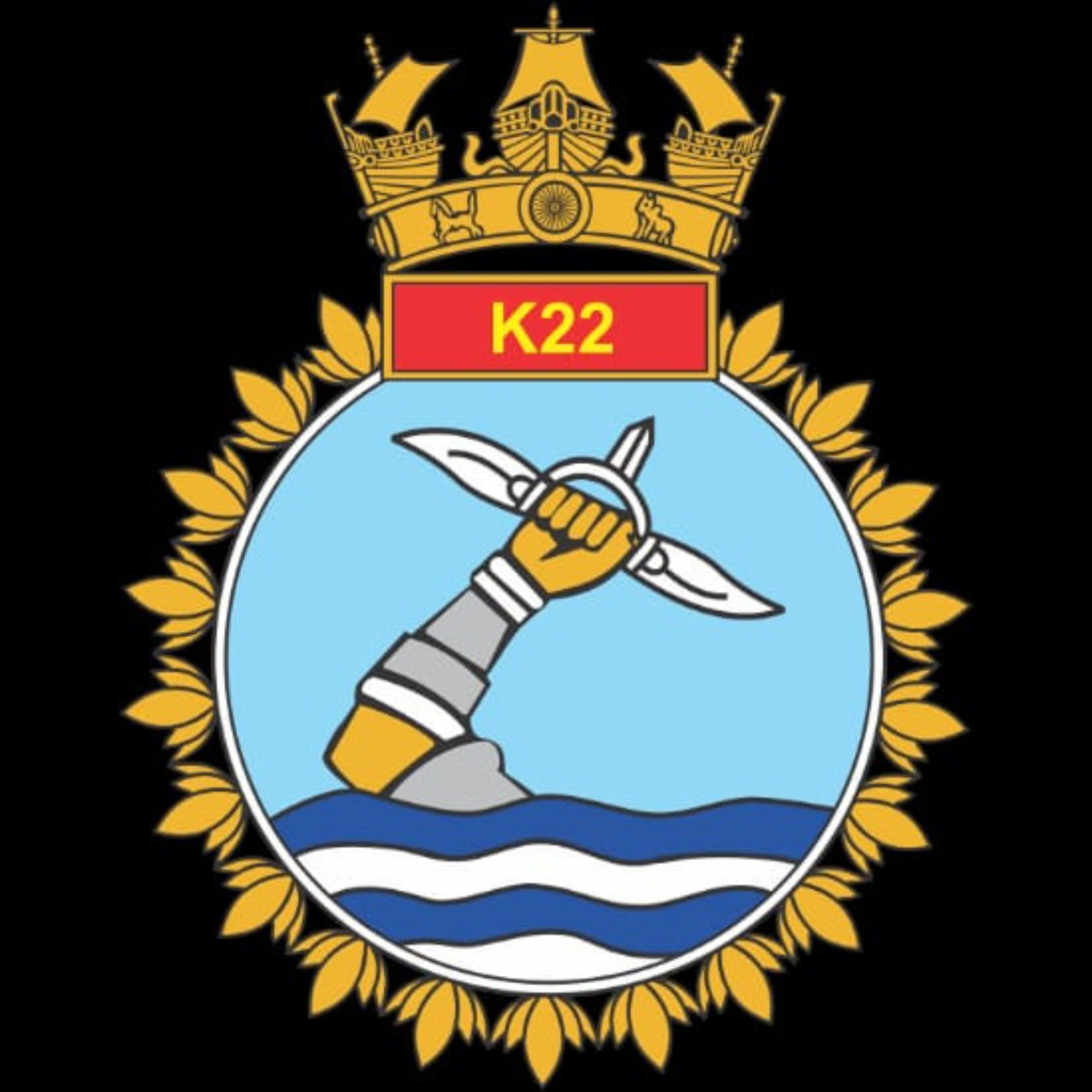
- Crest of the 22nd Missile Vessel Squadron
- Founded: October 1991
- Country: India
- Branch: Indian Navy
- Type: Squadron
- Part of: Maharashtra Naval Area
- Headquarters: Mumbai
- Nickname: Killer Squadron
- Mottos: Hit First, Hit Hard
- Engagements: As 25 Squadron; Operation Trident; Operation Python; As 22 Squadron; Operation Talwar; Operation Parakram
- Decorations: President's Standard

Commanders
- Captain K22: Commodore Amanpreet Singh
- Notable commanders: Commodore Babru Bhan Yadav, MVC (as K25)

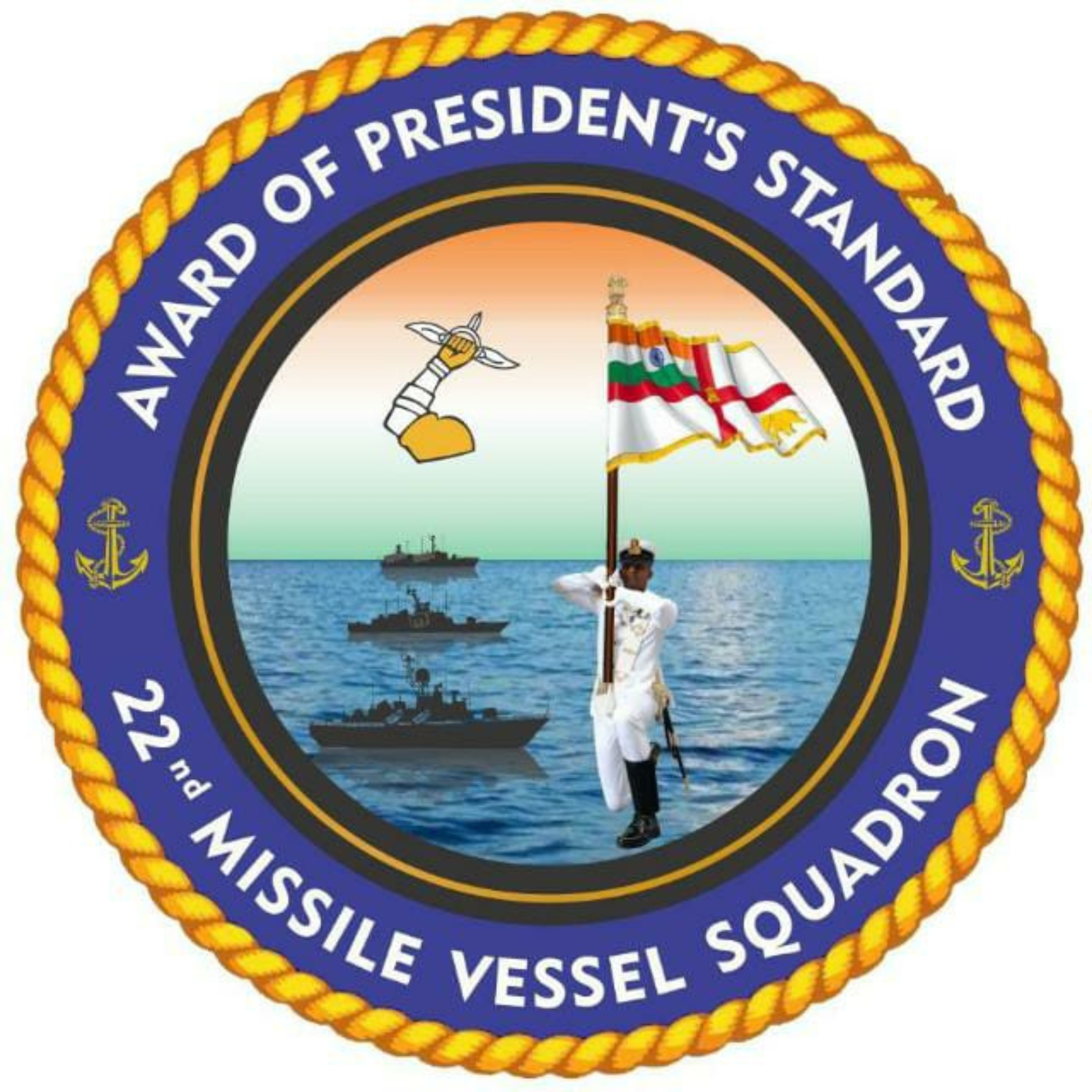
Award of President's Standard to the Squadron.

The 22nd Missile Vessel Squadron, commonly referred to as the Killer Squadron, is a formation of the Indian Navy, composed primarily of Veer-class corvettes. This squadron, based in INS Agnibahu, Mumbai, was officially established in October 1991 with a complement of ten Veer-class and three Prabal-class missile boats. However, the roots of the Killer Squadron trace back to 1969, when the Indian Navy inducted Osa-class missile boats from the Soviet Union. These vessels were transported to India on heavy lift merchant ships and were commissioned in early 1971 at Kolkata (then Calcutta). The squadron quickly demonstrated its prowess in the Indo-Pakistani War of 1971, playing a decisive role in the conflict.

== History ==
The Killer Squadron earned its name through its heroic actions during the Indo-Pakistani War of 1971. On the night of December 4–5, 1971, the squadron launched a surprise offensive, codenamed Operation Trident, against the Pakistan Navy. The Indian Navy ships INS Nirghat, INS Nipat, and INS Veer fired their Styx missiles, sinking the Pakistan Navy destroyer PNS Khyber and the minesweeper PNS Muhafiz. This operation dealt a significant blow to the Pakistan Navy, with no casualties sustained by the Indian forces.

Following this, on the night of December 8–9, 1971, the squadron executed another successful operation, Operation Python. The INS Vinash, accompanied by two frigates, launched four Styx missiles, sinking the Pakistan Navy's fleet tanker PNS Dacca and causing significant damage to the Keamari Oil Storage Facility in Karachi. The Indian forces did not suffer any casualties during this operation.

The success of these operations not only established the Killer Squadron's reputation but also led to December 4 being celebrated as Navy Day in India, commemorating the squadron's decisive role in the 1971 war.

== Formation ==
The 22nd Missile Vessel Squadron's vessels are named in honor of the legendary 25th Killer Missile Boat Squadron, known for its daring actions during the Indo-Pakistani War of 1971. This includes their pivotal roles in Operation Trident and Operation Python, where they were instrumental in sinking multiple Pakistani naval vessels.

The last two ships of the Veer-class in this squadron were upgraded to Tarantul V models. These vessels were outfitted with advanced weaponry, including 16 SS-N-25 'Switchblade' (URAN E) missiles, an OTO Melara 76 mm naval gun, and the MR 352 Positiv-E (NATO: Cross Dome) radar system.

On 28 April 2016, INS Veer and INS Nipat, two of the oldest Veer-class corvettes, were decommissioned, marking the end of an era for the Indian Navy.

As of 2021, the squadron includes the Veer-class corvettes INS Prabal, INS Pralaya, INS Nashak, INS Nishank, INS Vipul, INS Vibhuti, INS Vinash and INS Vidyut.

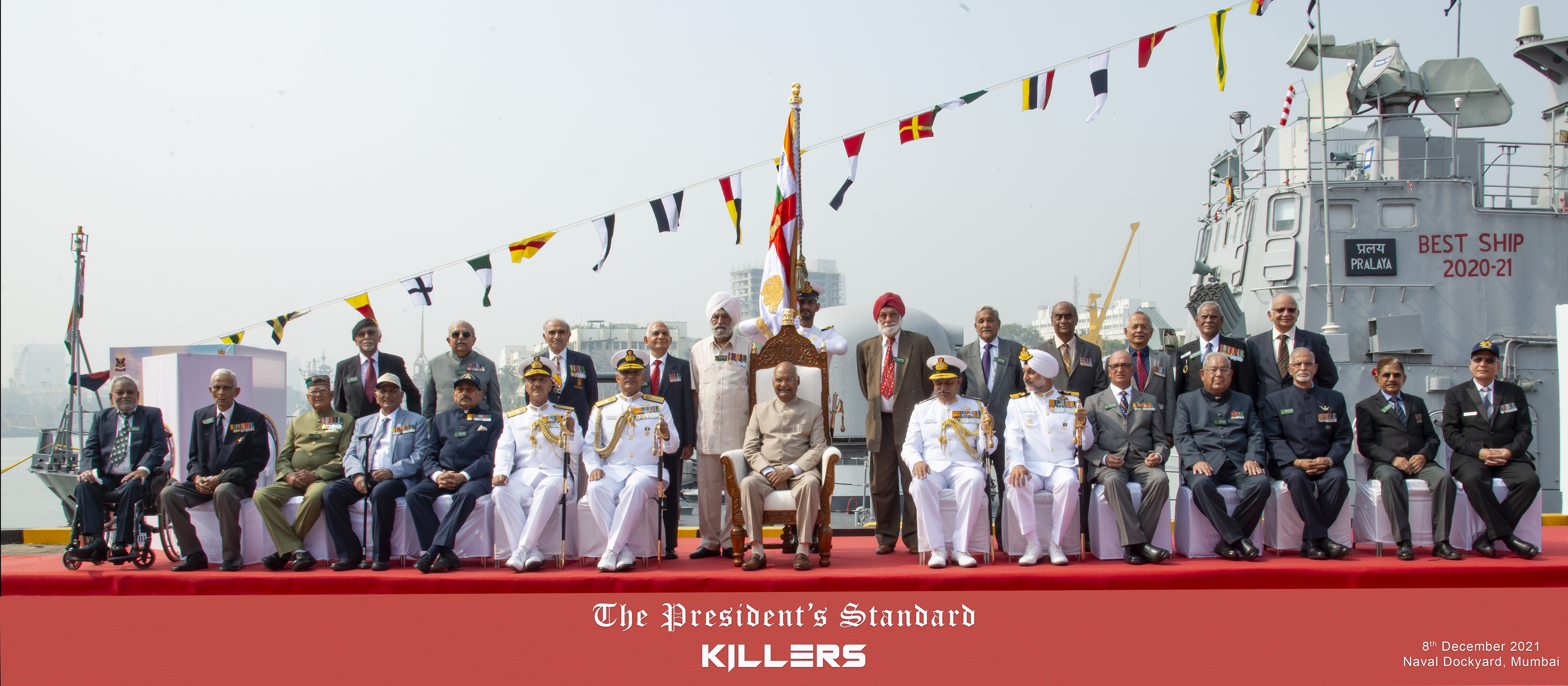
LEGENDS of the INDIAN NAVY

On 3 June 2022, INS Nishank was decommissioned from service.

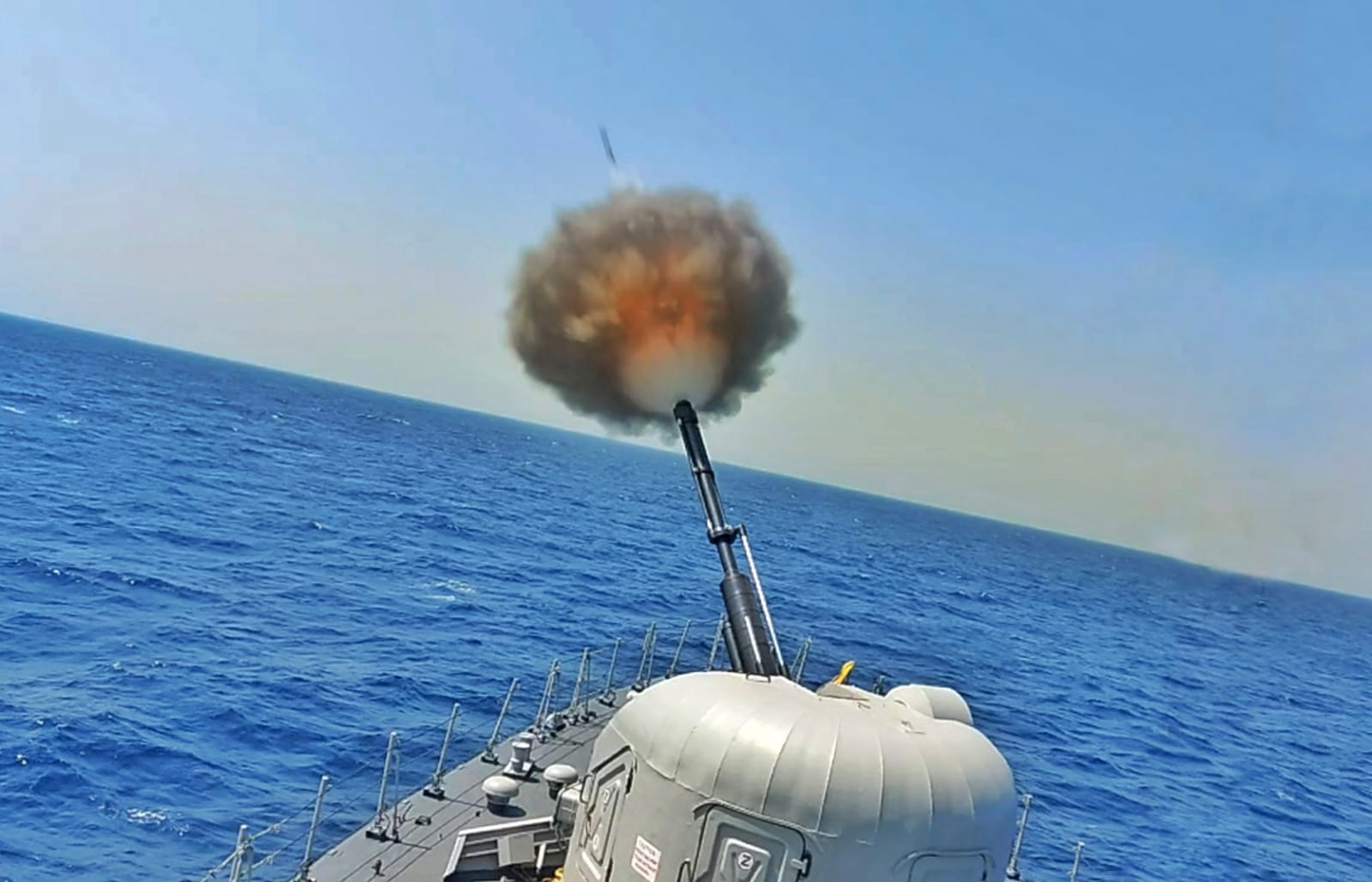
Missile boat of the Killer Squadron firing.

== Legacy and honours ==
The year 2021 marked the 50th anniversary of the 1971 victory, celebrated nationwide as Swarnim Vijay Varsh. It also marked five decades since the inception of the Killer Squadron. Over the years, the squadron has maintained its reputation as the "tip of the Sword Arm" of the Indian Navy, participating in key operations such as Operation Vijay, Operation Parakram, and most recently, during heightened security following the Pulwama attack, where it was deployed within striking distance of the Pakistan coast.

The 22nd Missile Vessel Squadron has earned numerous battle honors, including one Maha Vir Chakra, seven Vir Chakras, and eight Nausena Medals (Gallantry).

The squadron was awarded the President's Standard on 8 December 2021 by the then President of India Ram Nath Kovind at the Naval Dockyard (Mumbai) {ND(Mbi)} at a ceremonial parade. A commemorative stamp as well as a special day cover produced by the postal department were released to mark the day simultaneously.
