= Shantanu Jha =

Indian Navy Admiral

Rear Admiral Shantanu Jha NM
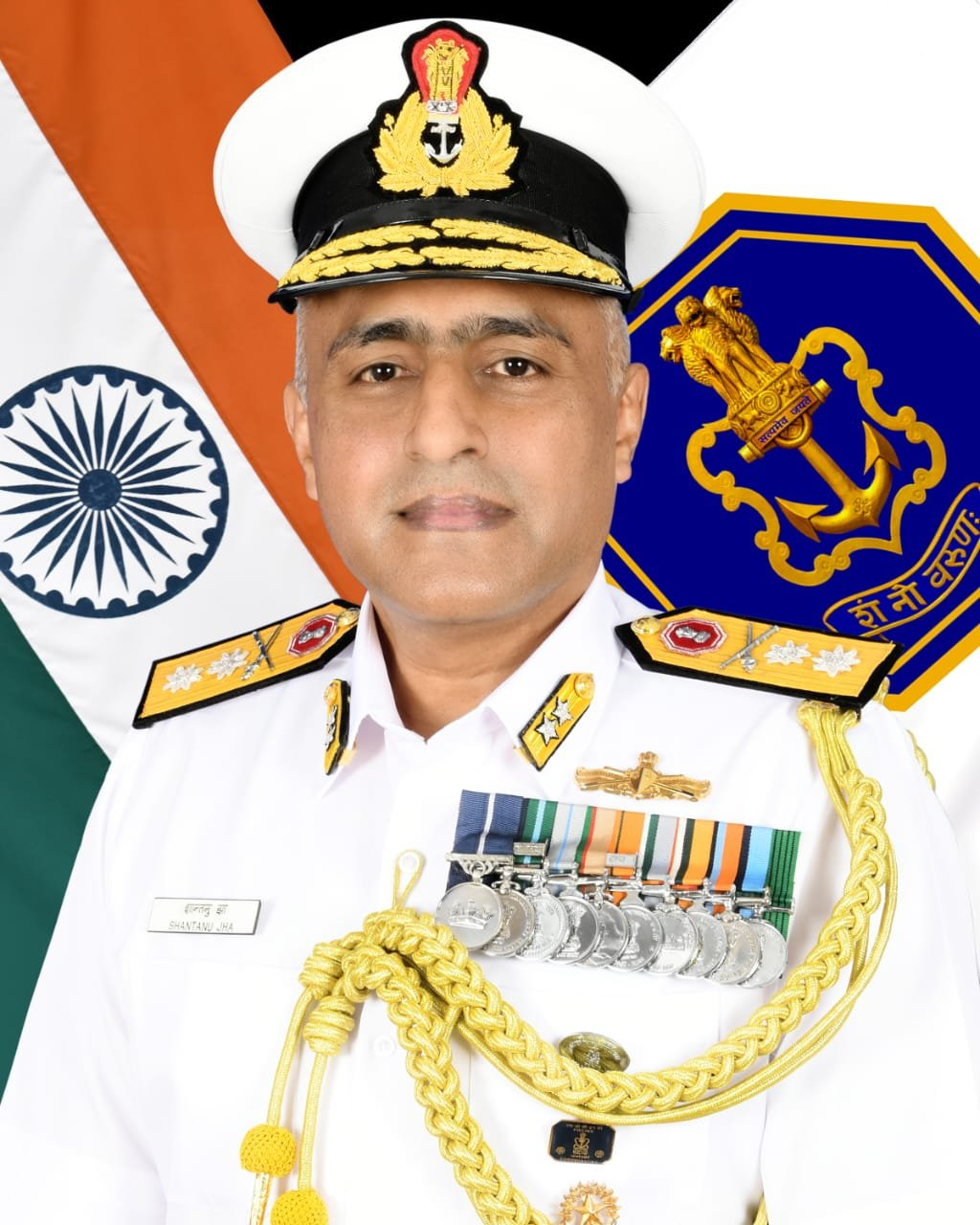
- Military career
- Allegiance: India
- Branch: Indian Navy
- Service years: 1993 – present
- Rank: Rear Admiral
- Commands: Maharashtra Naval Area; INS Sahyadri (F49); INS Kora (P61); INS Nishank (K43)

Rear Admiral Shantanu Jha, NM is a serving Flag officer in the Indian Navy. He currently serves as the Assistant Chief of the Naval Staff (Foreign Cooperation & Intelligence). He earlier served as the Flag Officer Commanding Maharashtra Naval Area.

== Naval career ==
Jha attended the National Defence Academy and was commissioned into the Indian Navy on 1 July 1993. He specialised in Navigation and Direction and served as the Navigation officer onboard multiple frigates and destroyers, and the aircraft carrier INS Viraat (R22). He attended the Defence Services Staff College, Wellington. Jha commanded the Veer-class corvette INS Nishank (K43) and the Kora-class corvette INS Kora (P61). He also served as the Joint Director (Personnel) at naval headquarters.

As a Captain, Jha served as the Naval attaché (NA) at the Embassy of India at Tehran, Iran and as the Naval Assistant to Vice Chief of the Naval Staff. He also served as the Executive officer of the aircraft carrier INS Vikramaditya (R33) under the command of Captain Ajay Kochhar. In 2018, he took command of the Shivalik-class stealth guided missile frigate INS Sahyadri (F49). He led the ship on a long overseas deployment across South-East Asia, United States and Australia. In June, Sahyadri participated in Malabar 2018 exercise in the Philippine Sea. This was followed by Exercise RIMPAC off Pearl Harbor. On her way back, Sahyadri called on Fiji and exercised with the Royal Australian Navy in Exercise Kakadu in September.

Promoted to the rank of Commodore, Jha was selected to attend the Royal College of Defence Studies in London. He then served as Commodore (Foreign Cooperation) and as the Commodore (Strategy, Concepts and Transformation), both at NHQ. On 26 January 2023, he was awarded the Nao Sena Medal for devotion to duty.

=== Flag rank ===
Jha was promoted to flag rank in January 2024 and was appointed Chief Staff Officer (Operations) of the Eastern Naval Command. On 17 October 2025, he was appointed Flag Officer Commanding Maharashtra Naval Area (FOMA). He took over from Rear Admiral Anil Jaggi. He relinquished command on 31 July 2026, handing over to Rear Admiral Vidhyadhar Harke.

== Awards and decorations ==
Jha was awarded the Nao Sena Medal in 2023. He has also been commended by the Chief of the Naval Staff and the Commander-in-Chief on four occasions.

| Nao Sena Medal | Samanya Seva Medal | Operation Vijay Medal | Operation Parakram Medal |
| Sainya Seva Medal | 75th Independence Anniversary Medal | 50th Independence Anniversary Medal | 30 Years Long Service Medal |
| | 20 Years Long Service Medal | 9 Years Long Service Medal | |

Military offices
| Preceded by Anil Jaggi | Flag Officer Commanding Maharashtra Naval Area; 2025 – 2026 | Succeeded by Vidhyadhar Harke |
