= Sathish Vasudev =

Indian Navy Admiral

Rear Admiral Sathish Vasudev NM
- सतीश वासुदेव
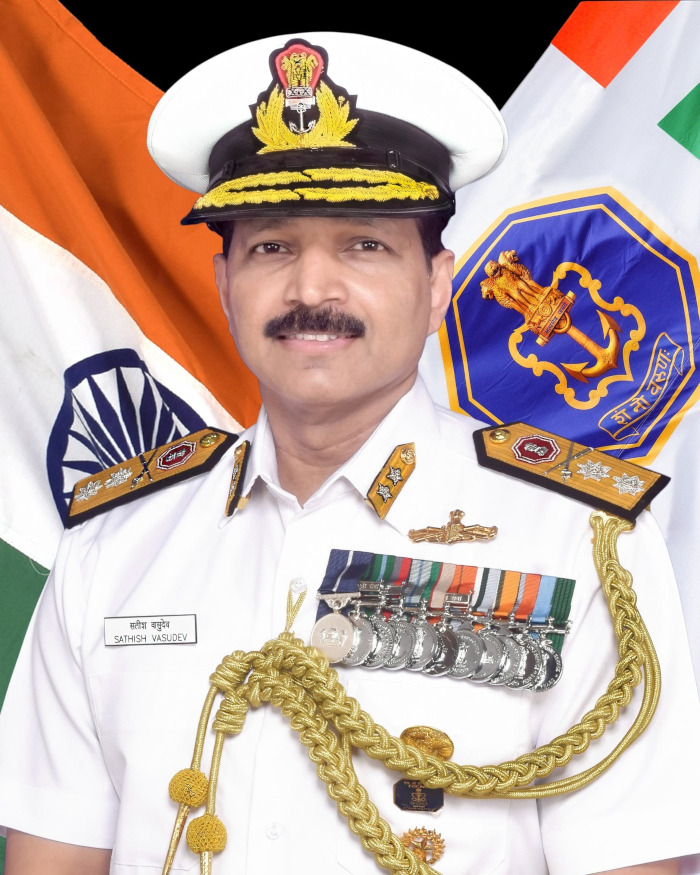
- Born: 1971 (age 54–55)
- Alma mater: National Defence Academy Defence Services Staff College Naval War College, Goa
- Military career
- Allegiance: India
- Branch: Indian Navy
- Service years: 1993–present
- Rank: Rear Admiral
- Commands: Flag Officer Commanding Gujarat Naval Area Flag Officer Defence Advisory Group INS Tarkash (F50); INS Gomati (F21)
- Conflicts: Operation Vijay (1999) 2001–2002 India–Pakistan standoff 2025 India–Pakistan conflict
- Awards: NM

Rear Admiral Sathish Vasudev, NM is a serving Flag officer in the Indian Navy. He currently serves as the Chief Staff Officer (Operations) of the Western Naval Command. He earlier served as the Flag Officer Commanding Gujarat Naval Area and as the Flag Officer Defence Advisory Group.

== Naval career ==
Sathish graduated from the National Defence Academy, Khadakvasla and was commissioned into the Indian Navy on 1 July 1993. He is a specialist in Navigation and Direction. He attended the Defence Services Staff College, Wellington and the Naval War College, Goa.

In his staff appointments, Sathish has served in the Directorate of Naval Operations as the War Room Commander, as the Director of Naval Plans and Commodore (Naval Plans) at Naval Headquarters and as the Commodore (Operations) of the Eastern Naval Command. He also served as the Director (Perspective Planning) at the Army headquarters. In addition, he has served as an instructor at his alma maters, the ND school, Kochi and at the Defence Services Staff College in Wellington.

In the rank of Commander, Sathish has commanded the Godavari-class guided-missile frigate INS Gomati (F21) and has been the executive officer of the lead ship of her class of frigates INS Talwar (F40) . He later commanded the Teg class Frigate INS Tarkash (F50) in the rank of Captain. During his command, in 2019, Tarkash had a long Overseas Deployment to Africa, Europe and Russia. She called on many cities including Dakar, Lagos, Walvis Bay, Helsinki, Cádiz and Saint Petersburg. She also participated in the Russian Navy Day celebrations. He was awarded the Nau Sena Medal on 26 January 2022 for devotion to duty.

=== Flag rank ===
Sathish was promoted to flag rank on 1 March 2024 and was appointed Flag Officer Defence Advisory Group and Advisor Offshore Security and Defence to the Government of India. After a short stint, he was appointed Flag Officer Commanding Gujarat Naval Area (FOGNA), one of the five naval area commanders. He took over from Rear Admiral Anil Jaggi on 24 August 2024 at Porbandar. On 1 November 2025, he relinquished charge of Gujarat Naval Area to Rear Admiral Sritanu Guru. On 15 November, he took over as the Chief Staff Officer (Operations) of the Western Naval Command.

== Awards and decorations ==
Sathish was awarded the Nau Sena Medal by the President of India for devotion to duty in the year 2022. He has also been commended by the Chief of the Naval Staff in 2009 and by the Flag Officer Commanding-in-Chief Western Naval Command in 2001.

Nau Sena Medal	Samanya Seva Medal	Special Service Medal	Operation Vijay Medal
Operation Parakram Medal	Sainya Seva Medal	75th Independence Anniversary Medal	50th Independence Anniversary Medal
30 Years Long Service Medal	20 Years Long Service Medal		9 Years Long Service Medal

Military offices
Preceded by Anil Jaggi	Flag Officer Commanding Gujarat Naval Area; 2024 – 2025	Succeeded by Sritanu Guru
Preceded by Vidyadhar Harke	Chief Staff Officer (Operations), Western Naval Command; 2025 – Present	Incumbent
