= Anil Jaggi =

Indian Navy Admiral

Vice Admiral Anil Jaggi AVSM
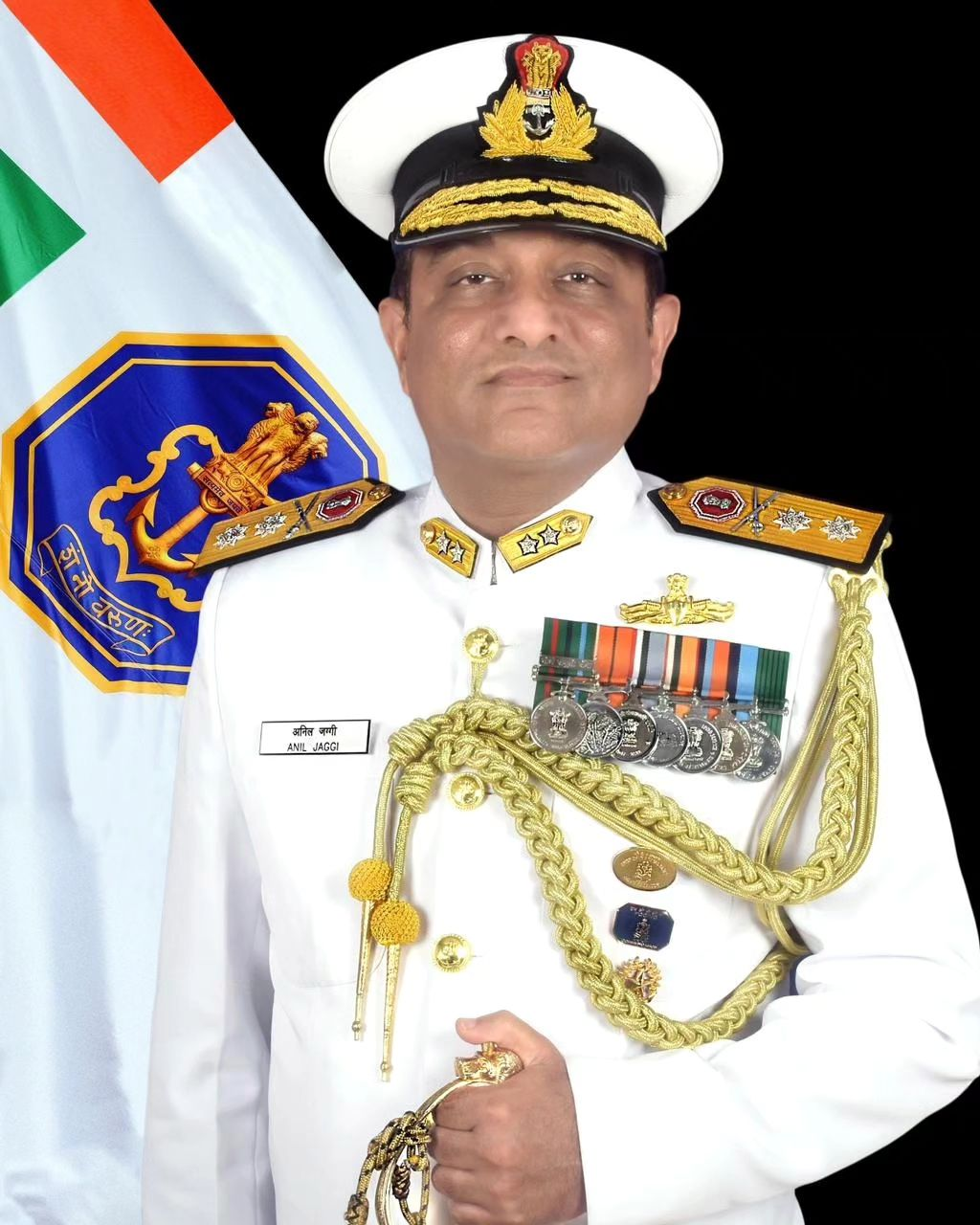
- Jaggi as a rear admiral
- Education: Indian Naval Academy
- Military career
- Allegiance: India
- Branch: Indian Navy
- Service years: 1 January 1993 – present
- Rank: Vice Admiral
- Service number: 04014-Y
- Commands: National Defence Academy; Maharashtra Naval Area; Gujarat Naval Area; INS Sahyadri (F49); INS Veer (K40); National Defence Academy
- Awards: Ati Vishisht Seva Medal

Vice Admiral Anil Jaggi, AVSM is a serving Flag officer in the Indian Navy. He currently serves as the Commandant of the National Defence Academy. He earlier served as the Flag Officer Commanding Maharashtra Naval Area, as the Flag Officer Commanding Gujarat Naval Area, and as the Naval adviser to the High Commissioner of India to the United Kingdom at India House, London.

== Naval career ==
Jaggi graduated from the Naval Academy, Goa and was commissioned into the Indian Navy on 1 January 1993. He is a specialist in Navigation and Direction. He attended the Defence Services Staff College, Wellington and the Naval War College, Goa. He also attended the United Nations Observer Course in Sweden.

In his staff appointments, Jaggi has served as the Joint Director and later Director in the Directorate of Naval Planning (DNP) at Naval Headquarters. He was an instructor at his alma mater Defence Services Staff College in Wellington.

Jaggi has commanded the lead ship of her-class of missile vessels INS Veer (K40). He then served as the executive officer of the Talwar-class frigate INS Tabar (F44) and commanded the Shivalik-class stealth guided missile frigate INS Sahyadri (F49). During his command, Sahyadri was adjudged the Best Ship of the Eastern Fleet. Also during his command, the ship was affiliated with the Poona Horse regiment of the Indian Army.

As a Commodore, Jaggi served as the Naval advisor to the High Commissioner of India to the United Kingdom at the High Commission of India, London. The High Commissioners during his tenure were Ruchi Ghanashyam, Gaitri Issar Kumar and Vikram Doraiswami. He subsequently moved to naval headquarters as the Commodore (Foreign Cooperation) in the Directorate of Foreign Cooperation and Intelligence at Naval HQ, New Delhi.

=== Flag rank ===
Jaggi was promoted to flag rank on 1 August 2023 and was appointed Flag Officer Commanding Gujarat Naval Area. He took command from Rear Admiral Sameer Saxena. On 1 September 2024, he took over as the Flag Officer Commanding Maharashtra Naval Area (FOMA) from Rear Admiral Manish Chadha. He was the FOMA during Operation Sindoor. On 1 November 2025, he was promoted to the rank of Vice Admiral and appointed Commandant of the National Defence Academy. He was awarded the Ati Vishisht Seva Medal on 26 January 2026.

== Awards and decorations ==

Ati Vishisht Seva Medal	Samanya Seva Medal	Sainya Seva Medal	75th Independence Anniversary Medal
50th Independence Anniversary Medal	30 Years Long Service Medal	20 Years Long Service Medal	9 Years Long Service Medal

Military offices
Preceded by Sameer Saxena	Flag Officer Commanding Gujarat Naval Area; 2023 – 2024	Succeeded by Sathish Vasudev
Preceded by Manish Chadha	Flag Officer Commanding Maharashtra Naval Area; 2024 – 2025	Succeeded by Shantanu Jha
Preceded by Gurcharan Singh	Commandant of the National Defence Academy; 2025 - Present	Incumbent
