= INS Dwarka =

Indian Navy base in Okha, Gujarat, India

- Okha, Gujarat

Site information
- Type: Forward Operating Base
- Controlled by: Indian Navy

Location
- Coordinates: 22°25′56″N 69°2′27″E

Site history
- Built: 26 November 1974
- In use: 1972-present

Garrison information
- Occupants: Western Naval Command

INS Dwarka is a Forward Operating Base (FOB) of the Indian Navy and is located at Okha, Gujarat.

== History ==
INS Dwarka has historical significance as it is the only Indian Navy establishment to have ever seen direct action with the adversary. Its origin can be traced back to the 1965 hostilities with Pakistan. On 7 Sep 1965, a flotilla of the Pakistan Navy, carried out bombardment on Dwarka town with the objective of disabling the radar station there. Although the limited engagement caused insignificant damage of no strategic value, the Indian Navy realized the inevitable requirement to establish a forward outpost nearer to Pakistan. As a result, a small forward outpost was created in Feb 1966 at Port Okha under Naval Officer-in-Charge (Kathiawar). On 26 Nov 1972, this small outpost comprising four officer and 59 sailors was commissioned as INS Dwarka in its present location. NOIC (Kathiawar) was re-designated as NOIC (Saurashtra) on 7 Jul 1983. In Mar 1985, the office of NOIC (Saurashtra) was bifurcated and an officer of the rank of Commander was appointed as Commanding Officer, INS Dwarka.

It is currently under the operational and administrative command of NOIC (Gujarat).

== Objective ==
The primary role of INS Dwarka is defence of Port Okha and to provide infrastructure, operation logistics and diving support to naval ships. It helps in maintaining surveillance of north Arabian Sea and other deep water channels.

It also provides administrative and logistic support to all units of the Indian Coast Guard stationed at Okha Coast Guard Station. It helps in coordination of patrolling by Sagar Prahari Bal and Gujarat Marine Police training. Griffon-GRSE 8000 TD-Class Hovercraft are based at this station. Penant numbers

Pennant Number	Date of commission	Homeport	Remark
Flight I
H 184		Okha	Delivered in October 2001
H 185		Okha	Delivered in November 2001
Flight II
H 187	11 June 2012	Okha	
H 189	20 November 2012	Okha	
H 191	10 Apr 2013	Okha	

== See also ==
Indian navy

- List of Indian Navy bases
- List of active Indian Navy ships

Integrated commands and units

- Armed Forces Special Operations Division
- Defence Cyber Agency
- Integrated Defence Staff
- Integrated Space Cell
- Indian Nuclear Command Authority
- Indian Armed Forces
- Special Forces of India

Other lists

- Strategic Forces Command
- List of Indian Air Force stations
- List of Indian Navy bases
- India's overseas military bases
