= Sameer Saxena (admiral) =

Indian Navy Admiral

Vice Admiral Sameer Saxena AVSM NM
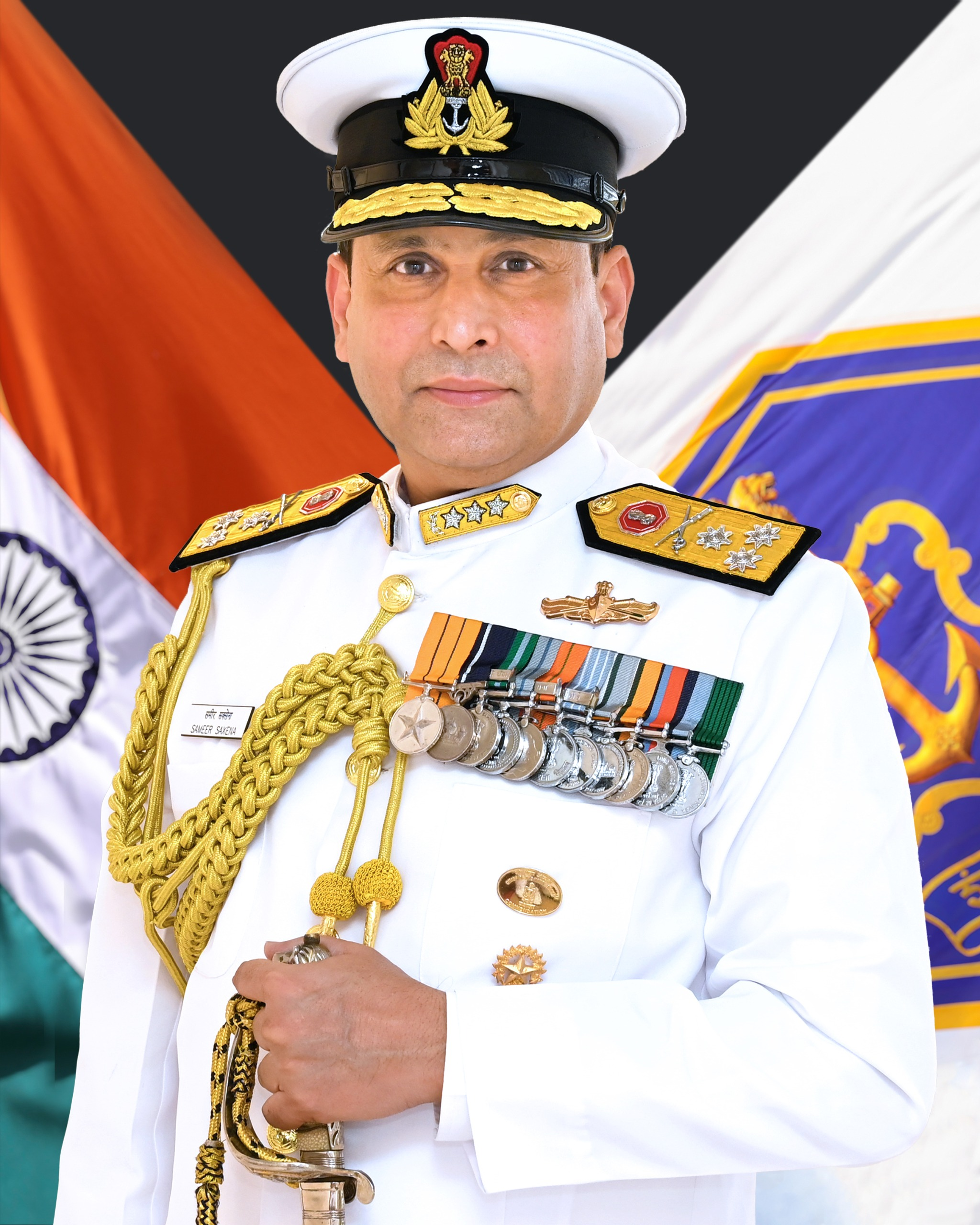
- Official portrait, 2025

Flag Officer Commanding-in-Chief Eastern Naval Command
- Incumbent
- Assumed office 31 October 2025
- Chief of Naval Staff: Dinesh Kumar Tripathi; Krishna Swaminathan
- Preceded by: Vennam Srinivas

Military service
- Allegiance: India
- Branch/service: Indian Navy
- Years of service: July 1989 - present
- Rank: Vice Admiral
- Commands: Southern Naval Command; Gujarat Naval Area; Western Fleet; INS Mysore (D60); INS Kulish (P63); MCGS Guardian
- Service Number: 03498-Z
- Awards: Ati Vishisht Seva Medal; Nao Sena Medal

Vice Admiral Sameer Saxena, AVSM, NM is a serving Flag officer in the Indian Navy. He currently serves as the Flag Officer Commanding-in-Chief Southern Naval Command. He earlier served as the Flag Officer Commanding Gujarat Naval Area and as the Flag Officer Commanding Western Fleet.

== Early life and education ==
Saxena was born to Commodore MML Saxena, an officer in the Indian Navy. His uncle, Commodore HML Saxena, also was a naval officer. The Saxena brothers, HML and MML, both served on INS Vikrant as the executive officer and the navigation officer respectively during the Indo-Pak War of 1971.

Saxena joined and graduated from the National Defence Academy, Pune. He also attended the Defence Services Staff College, Wellington and the Naval War College, Newport, Rhode Island.

== Naval career ==
Saxena was commissioned into the Indian Navy on 1 July 1989 from the Indian Naval Academy, Ezhimala. He is a specialist in navigation and direction. He served in the direction team of the aircraft carrier INS Viraat (R22). He also served as the navigation officer of the Khukri-class corvette INS Kuthar (P46), the lead ship of her class of guided missile frigates INS Godavari (F20) and the lead ship of her class of guided missile destroyers INS Delhi (D61).

In his staff appointments, Saxena has served in the Directorate of personnel and as the Naval Assistant (NA) to the Chief of the Naval Staff. He also served as the Principal Director of Foreign Cooperation at NHQ. He also served in training appointments at his alma mater, the National Defence Academy, and the Centre for Leadership and Behavioural Studies.

Saxena has commanded the Seaward-class defense boat of the Mauritius Coast Guard, MCGS Guardian. He subsequently commanded the Kora-class corvette INS Kulish (P63). He then served as the executive officer of the Delhi-class destroyer INS Mumbai (D62) and commanded another ship of the same class of guided missile destroyers INS Mysore (D60).

In March 2016, as a Commodore, he was appointed the Naval advisor to the High Commissioner of India to the United Kingdom at the High Commission of India, London. The High Commissioners during his tenure were Yashvardhan Kumar Sinha and Ruchi Ghanashyam.

=== Flag rank ===
Saxena was promoted to flag rank in February 2020 and was appointed Assistant Chief of Naval Staff (Policy and Plans) (ACNS P&P) at naval headquarters. He took command of the Western Fleet on 27 December 2021 as the Flag Officer Commanding Western Fleet from Rear Admiral Ajay Kochhar. After a tenure of about a year as FOCWF, Saxena relinquished charge and handed over command to Rear Admiral Vineet McCarty on 15 November 2022. On 29 November, he took over charge as the Flag Officer Commanding Gujarat Naval Area (FOGNA).

On 1 August 2023, he was promoted to the rank of Vice Admiral and appointed Chief of Staff of the Eastern Naval Command (COS ENC). In his two-and-a-half-year tenure as COS, ENC was involved in operational and technical activities with focus on foreign cooperation, infrastructure development, community building and education. On 31 October 2025, he took over as Flag Officer Commanding-in-Chief Southern Naval Command from Vice Admiral Vennam Srinivas.

== Awards and decorations ==
Saxena was awarded the Nao Sena Medal in 2017 and the Ati Vishisht Seva Medal in 2023. He has also received the Chief of the Naval Staff commendation card and has been commended by the Commissioner of Police of Mauritius for acts of gallantry at sea.

Ati Vishisht Seva Medal	Nao Sena Medal	Samanya Seva Medal	Operation Vijay Medal
Sainya Seva Medal	Videsh Seva Medal	75th Anniversary of Independence Medal	50th Anniversary of Independence Medal
30 Years Long Service Medal	20 Years Long Service Medal		9 Years Long Service Medal

== See also ==
- Flag Officer Commanding Western Fleet
- Western Fleet

Military offices
Preceded by Ajay Kochhar	Flag Officer Commanding Western Fleet; 2021 – 2022	Succeeded by Vineet McCarty
Preceded by Manish Chadha	Flag Officer Commanding Gujarat Naval Area; 2022 – 2023	Succeeded by Anil Jaggi
Preceded by Sanjay Vatsayan	Chief of Staff, Eastern Naval Command; 2023 – 2025	Succeeded by Rahul Vilas Gokhale
Preceded by Vennam Srinivas	Flag Officer Commanding-in-Chief Southern Naval Command; 2025 – present	Incumbent
