= Additional secretary to the Government of India =

Senior government rank and civil service post in the Government of India

Union Additional Secretary
- State Emblem of India

- Flag of India
- Government of India
- Member of: Committee of Secretaries on Administration
- Reports to: Secretary to the Government of India; Union Council of Ministers; Prime Minister of India
- Term length: Term extendable
- Formation: 1940; 86 years ago (Note: The post of Additional Secretary emerged in British India during the early 1940s, mainly as a response to increased administrative complexity during World War II. It became more formally institutionalized after India’s independence in 1947, as part of the standardized Central Secretariat framework.)
- Salary: ₹182,200 (US$1,900) (Minimum Pay) to ₹224,100 (US$2,400) (Maximum Pay)

Additional Secretary (often abbreviated as AS, GoI or Union Additional Secretary or Additional Secretary to Government of India) is a post and a rank under the Central Staffing Scheme of the Government of India. The authority for creation of this post solely rests with Cabinet of India.

Additional secretary is mostly a career civil servant, and is a government official of high seniority. The civil servants who hold this rank are either from All India Services or Central Civil Services. All promotions and appointments to this rank and post are directly made by the Appointments Committee of the Cabinet.

In the functioning of Government of India, an additional secretary is the administrative head of a wing in a department. Additional secretaries in the Union Government is analogous to Lieutenant General or Major General (PSO) in Indian Armed Forces. In the Department of Military Affairs of the Ministry of Defence, an officer from all the three armed forces of the rank of Lieutenant General and equivalent is currently appointed (Note: See Atul Anand.) and designated as Additional Secretary (Army / Navy / Air force).

Additional secretaries rank 25th on order of precedence of India.

== History ==
During the majority of the British period, particularly between 1920 and 1940, the position of Joint Secretary to the Government of India functioned as the second-highest rank within central departments, subordinate only to Secretary to the Government of India. By the mid-1940s, the designation of Additional Secretary was introduced in select departments, but was not yet universal.

Sir Richard Tottenham, ICS had once expressed "In my opinion there is, or should be, no distinction of function, but only of pay between a joint and an additional Secretary. Additional and joint secretaries should not be either cheap secretaries or expensive deputy secretaries."

== Tenure and Appointment ==
=== Tenure ===
A member of All India Services is appointed to this rank and post only on tenure. This tenure is a deputation to the Central Government and is fixed for 4 years, after which they are sent back to their own parent cadre. To be eligible for deputation, a civil servant has to have a mandatory prior central work experience at Deputy Secretary and above level in Government of India.

A member of Central Civil Services is appointed to this rank and post as per vacancy in their own service cadre and are empanelled.

== Powers, responsibilities and postings ==
The organizational structure of a department of the Government of India.

Additional secretary is the overall in charge with the necessary measure of independent functioning and responsibility of the wing of the department allocated and entrusted to him. An additional secretary in charge of administration also exercises all administrative powers as head of the department wing of the ministry/department.

Additional secretaries and joint secretaries are responsible for filing all affidavits and responses before the Supreme Court of India.

The Prime Minister of India is the final authority on posting and transfer of officers of additional secretary level. Additional secretaries report to their departmental secretary and ministerial/departmental cabinet minister.

== Position ==
In the Union government, the members head department wings in the departments and ministries of Union Government.

Government nominated board members in the Central Public Sector Enterprises/Public Sector Undertakings are either of the rank of additional secretary or joint secretary.

According to the Seventh Central Pay Commission of India, IAS officers hold 98 out of 107 positions of additional secretary in the Government of India.

== Emolument, accommodation and perks ==
An Indian Diplomatic Passport and an Official Passport generally issued to Additional Secretary (GOI).

All additional secretaries to Government of India are eligible for a diplomatic passport. They are allotted Type-V (D-II and D-I) and Type-VI (C-II) apartments in areas like New Moti Bagh across Delhi by the Ministry of Urban Development (Directorate of Estates).

The salary and emolument in this rank is equivalent to Principal staff officers (PSO) of the rank of Major general and certain officers not PSOs, but in lieutenant general and equivalent ranks in Indian Armed Forces.

Additional Secretary, GoI monthly pay and allowances
Base Salary as per 7th Pay Commission (Per month)	Level on Pay Matrix	Sources
₹182,200 (US$1,900) (Minimum Pay) to ₹224,100 (US$2,400) (Maximum Pay)	Level 15	

== Reforms and challenges ==
Non-IAS civil services have complained to Government of India because of lack of empanelment in the rank/post of additional secretary on numerous occasions.

=== Lateral entry ===
During the tenure of Prime Minister Manmohan Singh, a new post was created named "Spokesman and Media Advisor to the Prime Minister", which was equivalent to this rank in Prime Minister's Office, where Sanjaya Baru served from 2004-2008.

== Bibliography ==
- Maheshwari, S.R. (2000). Indian Administration (6th ed.). New Delhi: Orient Blackswan Private Ltd. ISBN 9788125019886.
- Kirk-Greene, A. (2000). Britain's Imperial Administrators, 1858-1966. New York City: Springer. ISBN 9780230286320.
- Jayapalan, N. (2001). Indian Administration 2 Vols. Set. Atlantic Publishers & Distri. ISBN 9788171569212.
- Mehta, Dalpat Singh (1968). Handbook Of Public Relations In India. New Delhi: Allied Publishers. ISBN 978-8170233343.
