= Sagar Prahari Bal =

- Active: 2009–present
- Country: India
- Branch: Indian Navy
- Role: Coastal protection
- Size: 2,000 personnel
- Fleet: 80 fast interceptor boats

The Sagar Prahari Bal (SPB), is a unit of the Indian Navy, formed in March 2009, which is entrusted with the responsibility of patrolling India's coastal waters. The force consists of 2,000 personnel and is equipped with 80 patrol boats. The force was constituted after the Mumbai terror attacks and the main duty of the force is to guard against such terrorist attacks by patrolling the coastline and also to conduct search and rescue operations. The soldiers are trained at INS Shivaji, a naval training and engineering base, near Lonavala.

The SPB maintains security at all major and minor ports in India and carries out round the clock patrolling and is also part of search and rescue operations in times of emergency.

== Arms and Equipment ==
The arms and ammunition used by the Sagar Prahari Bal is manufactured by the Indian Ordnance Factories functioning under the Ministry of Defence.

- AKM
- IWI Tavor TAR-21
- Glock
- Sig P226
- MP5
- INSAS

== See also ==
- Solas Marine Fast Interceptor Boat
- Indian Navy
- Military of India
- Indian Naval Academy
- Indian Coast Guard
