= Rear admiral (India) =

Rank in the Indian Navy

Rear admiral रियर एडमिरल
- Flag of a rear admiral

- Rank insignia of a Rear admiral and Surgeon Rear admiral

- Vehicle plate of Rear Admiral
- Country: India
- Service branch: Indian Navy
- Abbreviation: RAdm/ Surg RAdm
- Rank group: Flag officer
- Rank: Two-star rank
- NATO rank code: OF 7
- Pay grade: Level 14
- Next higher rank: Vice admiral
- Next lower rank: Commodore
- Equivalent ranks: Major general (Indian Army); Air vice marshal (Indian Air Force)

Rear admiral is a two-star flag officer rank in the Indian Navy. It is the third-highest active rank in the Indian Navy. Rear admiral ranks above the one-star rank of commodore and below the three-star rank of vice admiral.

The equivalent rank in the Indian Army is major general and in the Indian Air Force is air vice marshal.

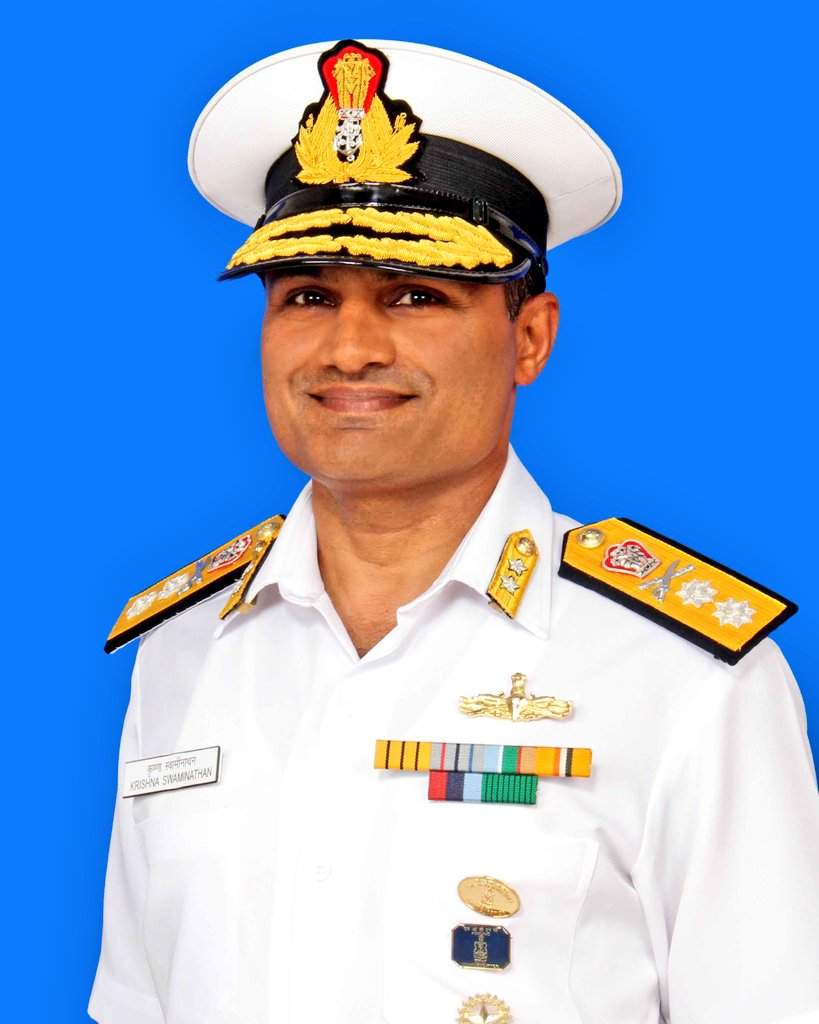
Vice Admiral Krishna Swaminathan as a rear admiral.

== History ==
Admiral Ram Dass Katari was the first Indian to be promoted to the rank of Rear admiral. In 1954, while serving as the Deputy Commander-in-Chief, in the absence of Rear Admiral Mark Pizey, he officiated as the Commander-in-Chief in the rank of rear admiral. On 12 March 1956, Katari was promoted to the acting rank of Rear Admiral. On 2 October 1956, he was confirmed as a substantive rear admiral and became the first Indian officer to be appointed the Flag Officer (Flotillas) Indian Fleet.

== Appointments ==
Officers in the rank of rear admiral hold important appointments like Flag Officer Commanding Western Fleet (FOCWF) and Flag Officer Commanding Eastern Fleet (FOCEF). The flag officers commanding naval areas (FONA/FOGA, FOMA, FOTNA, FOK, FOGNA) and the admiral superintendents of the naval dockyards are also officers of the rank of rear admiral. At naval headquarters, rear admirals hold the appointments of assistant chief of naval staff in different staff branches and those of additional director general.

== Insignia ==
The flag of a vice admiral has a gold-blue octagon bearing naval crest in the middle, and two blue stars placed vertically at hoist side.

The badges of rank have a crossed sword and baton over two eight-pointed stars and the Ashoka emblem above, on a golden shoulder board. A rear admiral wears gorget patches which are golden patches with two white stars. In addition to this, the double-breasted reefer jacket has two golden sleeve stripes consisting of a broad band with one narrow band.

== Order of precedence ==
A rear admiral who is a principal staff officer ranks at No. 25 in the Indian order of precedence. Other rear admirals are at No. 26 in the order of precedence.

Rear admirals are at pay level 14, with a monthly pay between ₹144,200 (US$1,950) and ₹218,200 (US$2,950).

== See also ==
- List of serving admirals of the Indian Navy
- Naval ranks and insignia of India

== Bibliography ==
- Singh, Anup (2018), Blue Waters Ahoy!: The Indian Navy 2001-2010, HarperCollins Publishers India, ISBN 978-9353025526
