= Vice admiral (India) =

Three-star flag officer rank in the Indian Navy

Vice Admiral वाइस एडमिरल
- Flag of a Vice admiral

- Rank insignia of a Vice Admiral and Surgeon Vice Admiral

- Vehicle star plate of a Vice Admiral
- Country: India
- Service branch: Indian Navy
- Abbreviation: VAdm/ Surg VAdm
- Rank group: Flag officer
- Rank: Three-star rank
- NATO rank code: OF 8
- Pay grade: Pay level 15,16,17
- Next higher rank: Admiral
- Next lower rank: Rear admiral
- Equivalent ranks: Lieutenant general (Indian Army); Air marshal (Indian Air Force)

Vice admiral is a three-star flag officer rank in the Indian Navy. It is the second-highest active rank in the Indian Navy. Vice admiral ranks above the two-star rank of rear admiral and below the four-star rank of admiral, which is held by the Chief of the Naval Staff (CNS).

The equivalent rank is lieutenant general in the Indian Army and air marshal in the Indian Air Force. Officers in the rank of vice admiral hold important appointments at the naval commands and naval headquarters.

== History ==
Admiral Ram Dass Katari was the first Indian to be promoted to the rank of Vice admiral. On 22 April 1958, he took over as the first Indian Chief of the Naval Staff (CNS) and promoted to the substantive rank of Vice Admiral.

From 1948 to 1968, the appointment of CNS, the professional head of the Indian Navy was held by a vice admiral. The position of the CNS was upgraded from vice admiral to admiral in 1968. The first officer to hold the rank was Admiral Adhar Kumar Chatterji who was promoted to the rank while he served as the CNS.

== Naval commanders (C-in-C grade) ==
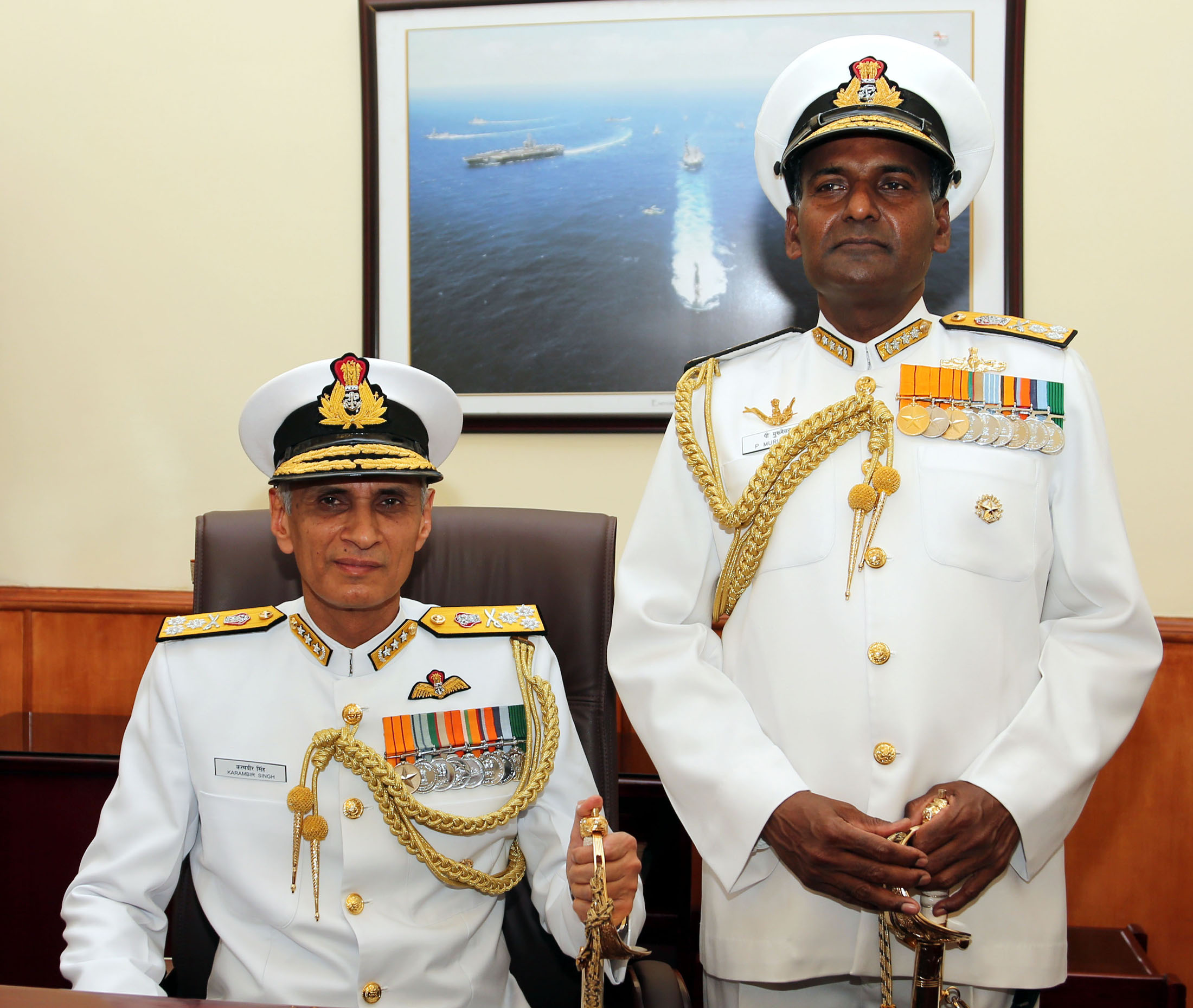
Vice Admirals Karambir Singh and P N Murugesan in uniform

Senior vice admirals who are in the C-in-C grade (naval commanders), are considered to be in a grade higher than other vice admirals. They hold the senior-most appointments like the Vice Chief of the Naval Staff and the heads of the three naval commands (styled "flag officer commanding-in-chief"). The three FOC-in-C appointments are:

- Flag Officer Commanding-in-Chief Eastern Naval Command
- Flag Officer Commanding-in-Chief Southern Naval Command
- Flag Officer Commanding-in-Chief Western Naval Command

== Appointments ==
At naval headquarters, the principal staff officers (PSO) are senior vice admirals. The Directors General and Controllers are also officers of the rank of vice admiral. The chiefs of staff of the Western Naval Command and the Eastern Naval Command are also vice admirals.

=== Indian Navy Medical Service ===
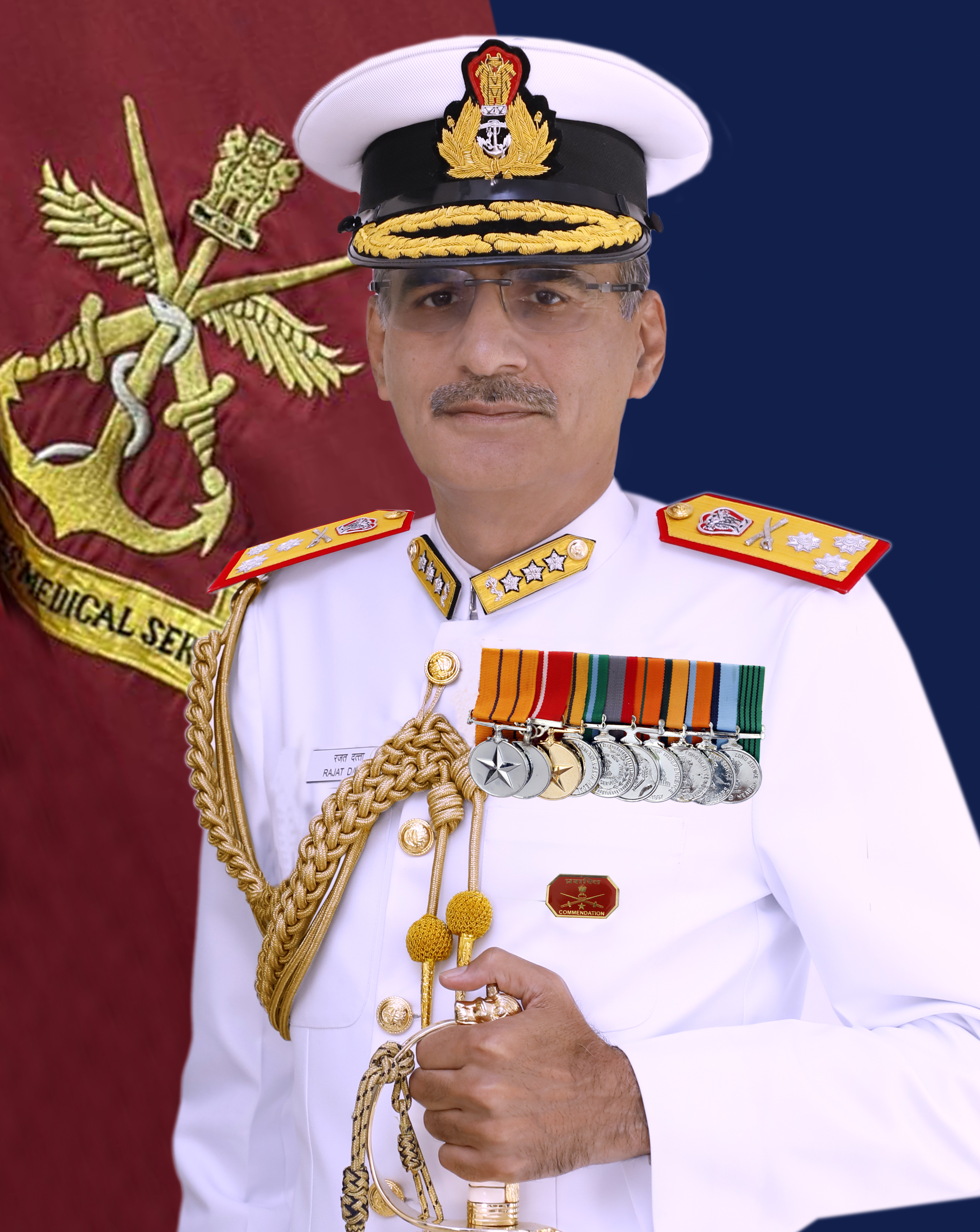
Surgeon Vice Admiral Rajat Datta (Retd), a distinct cardiothoracic surgeon. He held the highest office in AFMS, i.e., of DGAFMS, from 2021 to 2023

Surgeon Vice Admirals in the Indian Navy serve mainly as Director General Medical Services (Navy), the highest ranking medical officer of the Navy, and they may also be appointed as Director General Armed Forces Medical Services (DGAFMS) when the post rotates to the Navy, they can also hold senior roles like Command Medical Officer in major commands or high-level tri-service medical staff appointments.

== Insignia ==
The flag of a vice admiral has a gold-blue octagon bearing naval crest in the middle, and three blue stars placed vertically at hoist side.

The badges of rank have a crossed sword and baton over three eight-pointed stars and the Ashoka emblem above, on a golden shoulder board. A vice admiral wears gorget patches which are golden patches with three white stars. Naval commanders in the C-in-C grade have additional oak leaves under the three white stars. In addition to this, the double-breasted reefer jacket has three golden sleeve stripes consisting of a broad band with two narrower bands.

== Order of precedence ==
A vice admiral in the C-in-C grade ranks at No. 23 on the Indian order of precedence, along with lieutenant generals of the Indian Army and air marshals of the Indian Air Force in the C-in-C grade. The other vice admirals rank at No. 24 in the order of precedence.

Vice admirals in the C-in-C grade are at the apex pay scale (pay level 17), with a monthly pay of ₹225,000 (US$3,100). Other vice admirals, in the HAG+ pay scale (pay level 16) draw lesser, depending on the years in service. However, since they should not draw equivalent or more than the next higher level, the remuneration is capped at ₹224,000.

== See also ==
- List of serving admirals of the Indian Navy
- Naval ranks and insignia of India
