= Bismil (disambiguation) =

Bismil is a municipality and district of Diyarbakır Province, Turkey.

Bismil may also refer to:

- Bismil (singer) (born 1994), Indian singer and songwriter
- Bismil (TV series), 2024 Pakistani series
- Bismil Azimabadi (1901–1978), Indian independence activist and poet
- Ram Prasad Bismil (1897–1927), Indian writer and revolutionary
