= Sanjeev Bhasin =

Indian Navy admiral

Vice Admiral Sanjeev Bhasin PVSM, AVSM, VSM
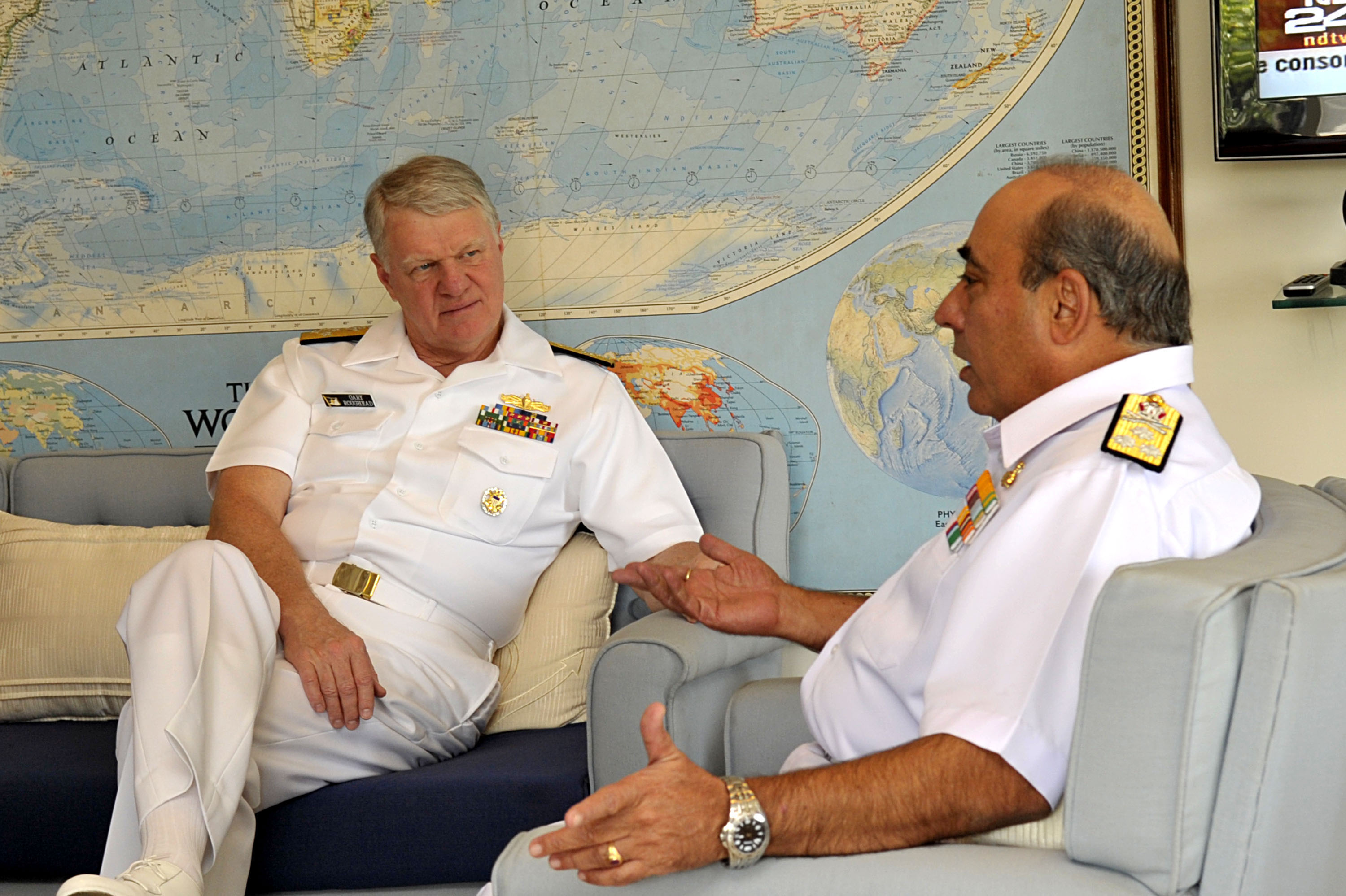
- Bhasin with Admiral Gary Roughead
- Military career
- Allegiance: India
- Branch: Indian Navy
- Service years: 1972 - 2012
- Rank: Vice Admiral
- Commands: Western Naval Command; INS Mumbai; INS Khukri; INS Ranjit
- Awards: Param Vishisht Seva Medal; Ati Vishisht Seva Medal; Vishisht Seva Medal

Vice Admiral Sanjeev Bhasin PVSM, AVSM, VSM, is a retired Indian Navy officer.

== Military career ==
He has commanded the Indian Navy ships INS Khukri, INS Mumbai as well as INS Ranjit.

He was promoted to rear admiral on January 1, 2002 and served as Flag Officer Commanding Eastern Fleet.

In November 2006 he was promoted to the rank of Vice Admiral in November 2006 and was Deputy Chief of the Integrated Defence Staff at HQ Integrated Defence Staff from January 2007 before taking over as Commandant of the National Defence College in October 2007.

He is a graduate of the United States Naval War College and College of Naval Warfare.

He has been awarded the Vishisht Seva Medal in 2003 and the Ati Vishisht Seva Medal in 2006.

== Military Decorations ==

Param Vishisht Seva Medal	Ati Vishisht Seva Medal	Vishisht Seva Medal	Poorvi Star
Paschimi Star	Sangram Medal	Operation Parakram Medal	Operation Vijay Medal
Videsh Seva Medal	50th Anniversary of Independence Medal	25th Anniversary of Independence Medal	30 Years Long Service Medal
20 Years Long Service Medal		9 Years Long Service Medal	

Military offices
Preceded by JS Bedi	FOC Western Naval Command; 2009 - 2012	Succeeded by Devendra Kumar Joshi
Preceded by S K Damle	Flag Officer Commanding Eastern Fleet; 2005-2006	Succeeded by Devendra Kumar Joshi
