= Robin K. Dhowan =

Indian admiral

Admiral Robin K. Dhowan PVSM, AVSM, YSM, ADC
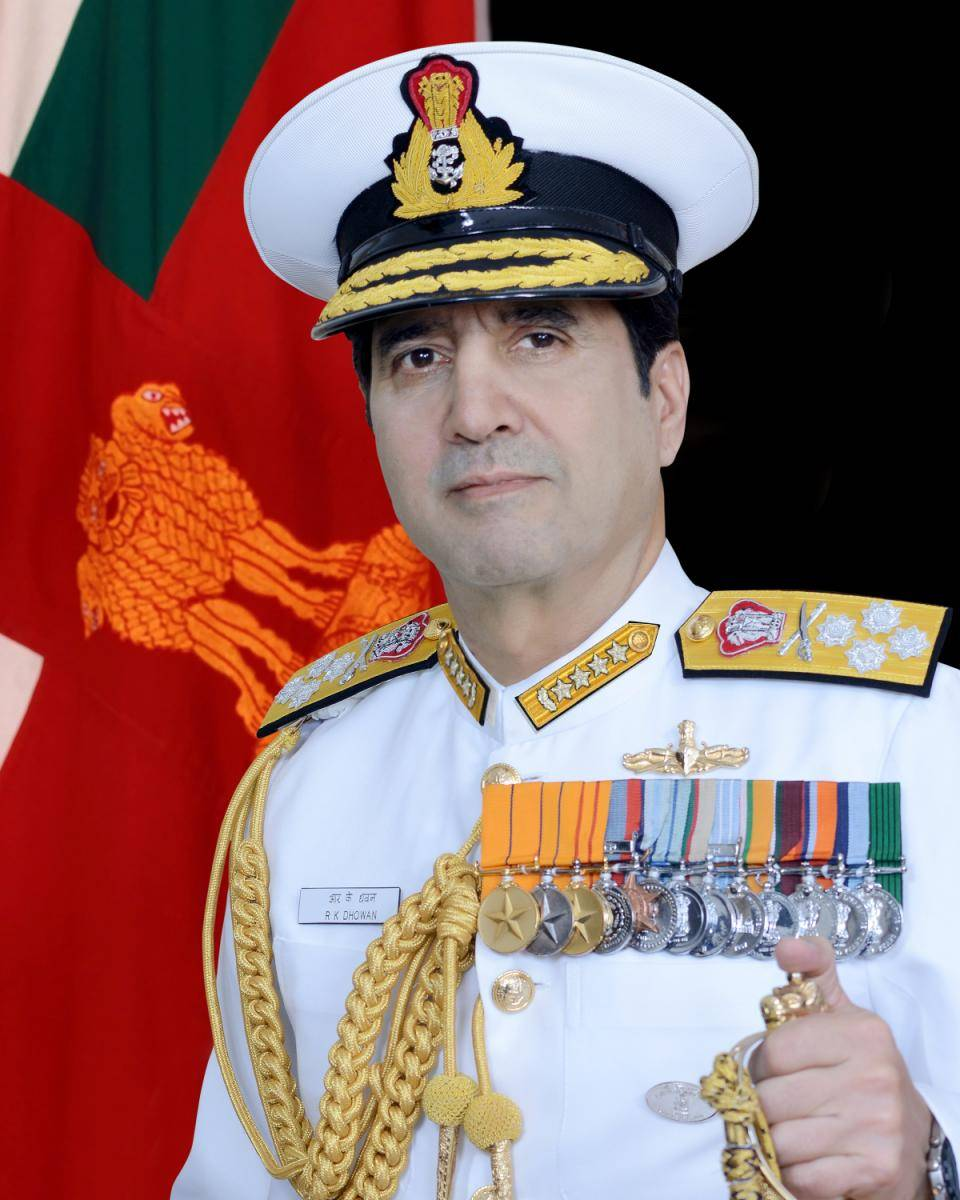
- Official Indian Navy portrait of Adm. Robin K. Dhowan, CNS

22nd Chief of the Naval Staff
- In office 17 April 2014 – 31 May 2016
- President: Pranab Mukherjee
- Prime Minister: Narendra Modi
- Preceded by: Devendra Kumar Joshi
- Succeeded by: Sunil Lanba

Personal details
- Born: Rabinder Kumar Dhowan
- Spouse: Minu Dhowan
- Awards: Param Vishist Seva Medal; Ati Vishist Seva Medal; Yudh Seva Medal

Military service
- Allegiance: India
- Branch/service: Indian Navy
- Years of service: 3 May 1975 – 31 May 2016
- Rank: Admiral
- Commands: Eastern Fleet; INS Delhi; INS Ranjit; INS Khukri

Admiral Rabinder "Robin" Kumar Dhowan PVSM, AVSM, YSM, ADC was the 22nd Chief of Naval Staff of the Indian Navy. He assumed office on 17 April 2014, succeeding Admiral D.K. Joshi.

== Military career ==
Dhowan graduated from the National Defence Academy (45th Course, Charlie squadron) on 1 January 1975. He was honoured with a "telescope" for being the "Best Cadet", and was later awarded the 'Sword of Honour' on completion of his midshipman training. He was commissioned an acting sub-lieutenant on 3 May 1975.

He is a "Navigation and Direction" specialist, and during his career he has commanded the missile corvette INS Khukri, and guided missile destroyers INS Ranjit and INS Delhi.

From 2002 to 2005, he was the Naval Adviser at the Indian High Commission at London.

== Flag rank ==
After his elevation to flag rank, he served in various staff and instructional assignments. He was the Assistant Chief of Naval Staff (Policy and Plans) (ACNS P&P) in the Integrated Headquarters (Navy) and then commanded the Eastern Fleet.

He also served as the Chief of Staff at Headquarters, Eastern Naval Command in Visakhapatnam and the Chief Staff Officer (Operations) at the Western Naval Command. He then took charge as the Commandant of the National Defence Academy, Khadakvasla, and later served as a Deputy Chief of Naval Staff.

He was appointed the Vice Chief of Naval Staff in August 2011.

He is an alumnus of National Defence Academy, Defence Services Staff College, and Naval War College, Rhode Island, USA, and has completed the Sea Harrier Direction course in the U.K.

== Personal life ==
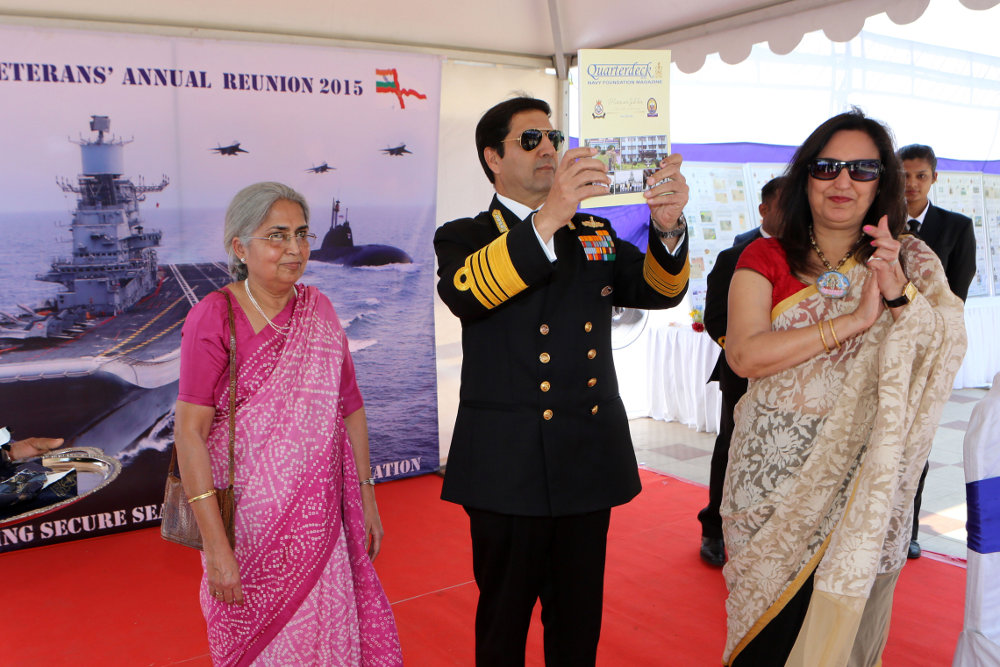
Dhowan with Minu Dhowan (right) and S. Ramsay, editor of Quarterdeck magazine, 22 February 2015.

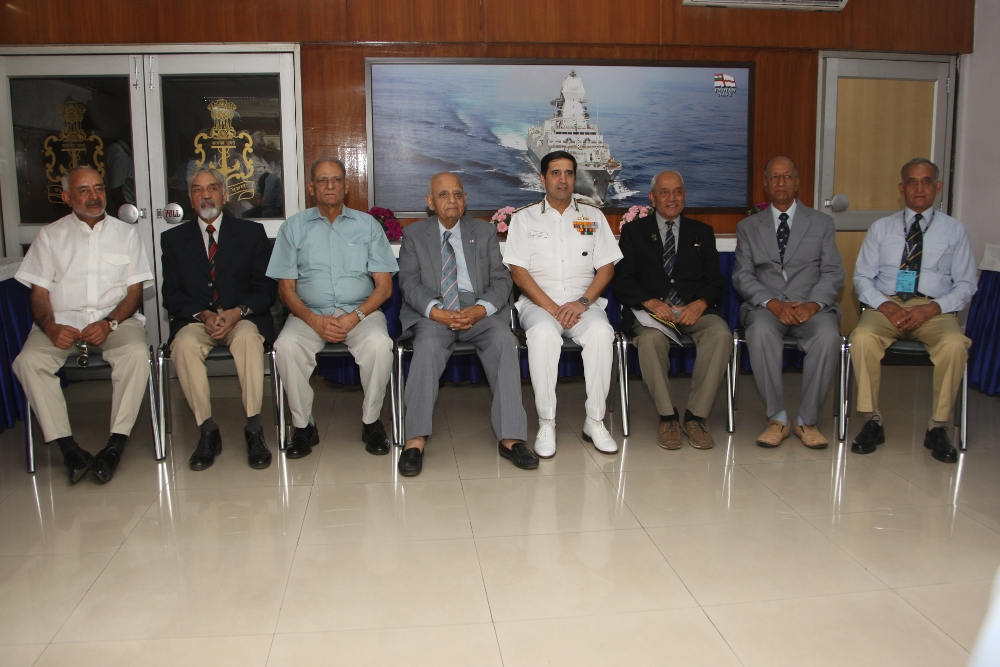
Former Indian Navy chiefs with Admiral Robin K. Dhowan (fourth-to-right) at the Conclave of Chiefs, 2015.

Admiral Dhowan is married to Minu Dhowan, and the couple have a daughter and two sons.

He plays golf and does yachting.

== Awards ==
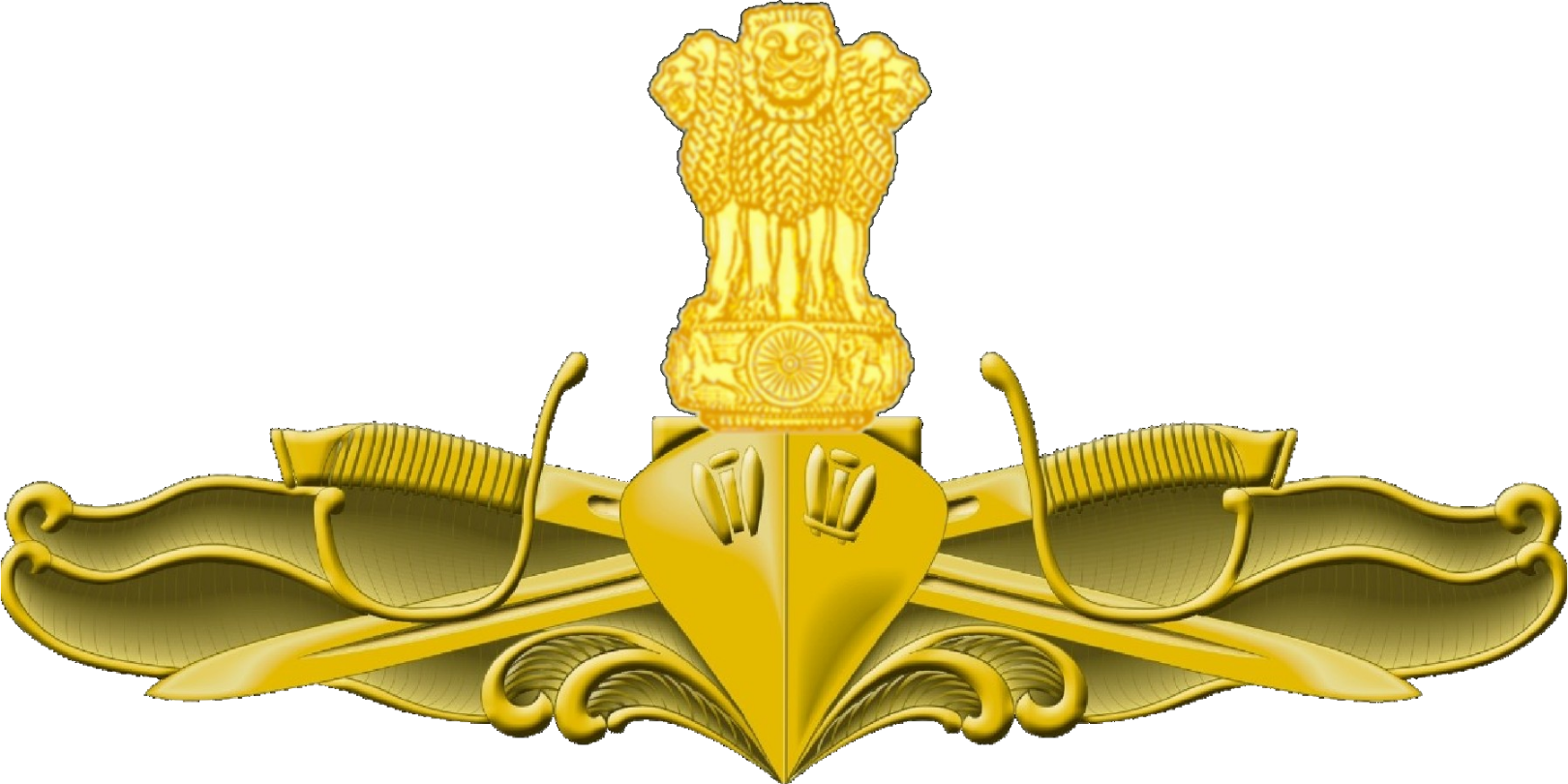

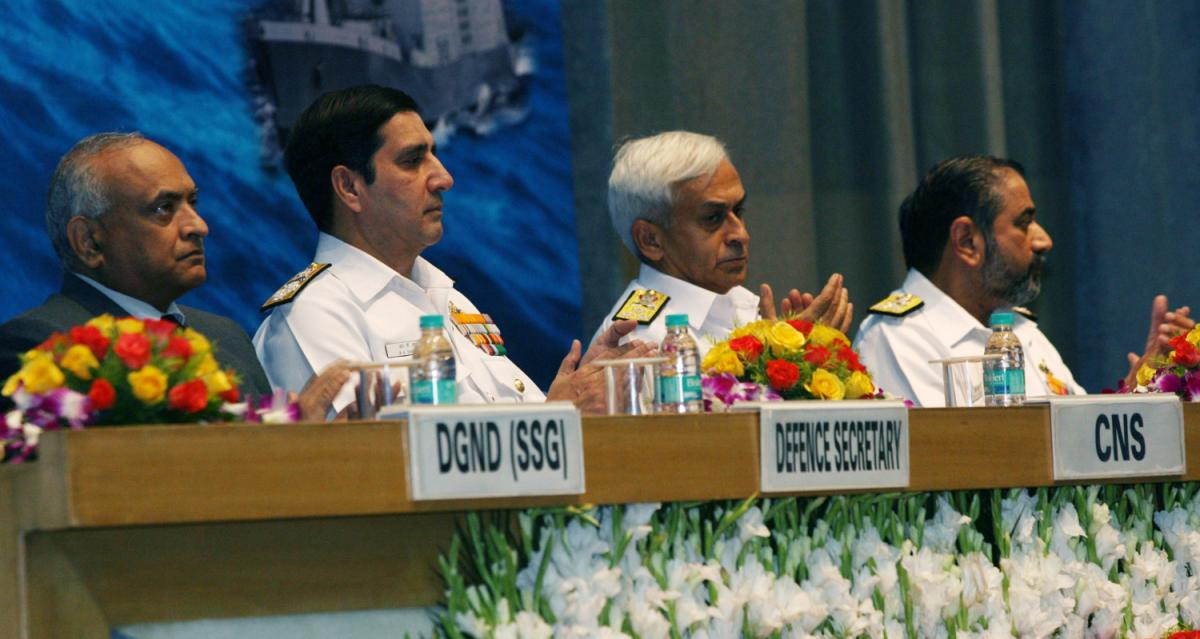
Admiral Dhowan (second-to-left), with Defence Secretary Radha Krishna Mathur (extreme left).

Surface warfare badge
Param Vishisht Seva Medal	Ati Vishisht Seva Medal	Yudh Seva Medal	Special Service Medal
Operation Vijay Star	Operation Vijay Medal	Operation Parakram Medal	Videsh Seva Medal
50th Anniversary of Independence Medal	25th Anniversary of Independence Medal		30 Years Long Service Medal
20 Years Long Service Medal		9 Years Long Service Medal	

Military offices
Preceded by Devendra Kumar Joshi	Chief of the Naval Staff; 2014-2016	Succeeded by Sunil Lanba
Preceded by D.K. Dewan	Vice Chief of Naval Staff; 2011-2014	Succeeded by Sunil Lanba
Preceded by Anup Singh	Deputy Chief of the Naval Staff; 2009-2011	Succeeded by Satish Soni
Preceded by Air Marshal T. S. Randhawa	Commandant of the National Defence Academy; 2008-2009	Succeeded by Satish Soni
Preceded by Devendra Kumar Joshi	Flag Officer Commanding Eastern Fleet; 2007-2008	Succeeded by Satish Soni
