= Atma Ram Sanatan Dharma College =

Constituent college of the University of Delhi

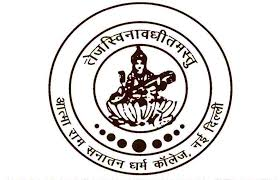
- Seal of ARSD College
- Other name: ARSD
- Former name: Sanatan Dharma College
- Motto: Sanskrit: तेजस्वी नवअधितम अस्तु
- Motto in English: May our learning be endowed with radiance
- Type: Government
- Established: 3 August 1959; 67 years ago
- Academic affiliations: University of Delhi
- Chairperson: Mahima Thakur
- Principal: Gyantosh Kumar Jha
- Faculty: 291
- Undergraduates: 3586
- Postgraduates: 167
- Location: South Campus, Dhaula Kuan, Delhi, New Delhi, India; 28.5912°N 77.1655°E
- Campus: South Campus
- Website: www.arsdcollege.ac.in

Atma Ram Sanatan Dharma College (ARSD College), formerly Sanatan Dharma College, is a co-educational constituent college of the University of Delhi. The college was founded on 3 August 1959, by the Sanatan Dharma Maha Sabha, Delhi. Shri Atma Ram Chadha, a philanthropist, took over as chairman of the college governing body in 1967.The college is one of the premier colleges of Delhi University. It was ranked 7th among colleges in India by the National Institutional Ranking Framework (NIRF) in 2025.

== Rankings ==
College rankings

General – India
- NIRF (Colleges) (2024): 5

Atma Ram Sanatan Dharma College is ranked 5th amongst colleges across India and ranked 4th among Delhi University colleges as per the NIRF India Rankings 2024. The college is one of the highest ranking colleges of India as per the NAAC rankings. The college has also achieved one of the highest NAAC score of '3.77' in year 2023 with 'A++' grade.

== Academics ==
The college offers various undergraduate and postgraduate courses under the aegis of the University of Delhi.

=== Undergraduate courses ===
- B.A. Programme
- B.A. Honours: Economics, English, Hindi, History, Political Science
- B.Com Honours/Programme
- B.Sc. Programme
- B.Sc. Honours: Chemistry, Computer Science, Electronics, Mathematics, Physics
- B.Sc.:Physical Science

=== Postgraduate courses ===
- Masters of Arts English, Hindi, Political Science
- Master of Commerce

== Annual Cultural Fest ==
=== TIDE ===
TIDE, the annual cultural festival of ARSD College, was founded in 1992-93. The three-day festival attracts students from all across India. The USP of the festival are its professional shows, including the Rock Show and Artist Concerts. Apart from this it holds competitions in Dramatics, Dance, Music, Fine Arts, Literary etc. bands like Rangreza, Band of Boom Boom, Tarkash, Sufi Rock N Raga, etc. and Singers like Sukh-E, Bohemia, Bismil, Amit Mishra, Badshah (rapper), Neeti Mohan Ajay Hooda, Sharry Mann, Harrdy Sandhu,Swati Sharma, Akhil Sachdeva, Mohammed Irfan etc. have performed at the festival. The festival is organized by Students' Union in collaboration with TARANGINI - The Cultural Society.

Official Instagram Handle for TIDE 2026 - https://www.instagram.com/tide.arsd/

== Clubs and societies ==
=== Cultural Society ===
The Culture Society of ARSD aims to encourage students' interest, participation and responsibility by providing social, cultural and recreational activities for the College community. Keeping this in mind the College has different groups which give students an opportunity to demonstrate and develop their talent in the fields of music, dance and other fields of culture, giving a boost to their physical and mental health.

=== Saarang ===
Saarang is a music society of Atma Ram Sanatan Dharma College (ARSDC), University of Delhi. Established in 2012, it is regarded as one of the prominent music societies within the Delhi University cultural circuit. The society comprises three primary wings: the Classical Music Wing, the Western Music Wing, and the Band, later two established by the 2024–2025 senior cohort.

Saarang regularly performs at college events and has contributed to the cultural profile of ARSD through both on-campus and off-campus appearances. Over the years, the society has secured multiple awards at inter-college competitions across the university circuit. Its rendition of the song “Chaudhary” has become one of its signature performances.

The society also organizes jamming sessions and collaborative musical activities, including partnerships with various ministries of the Government of India. These initiatives have contributed to enhancing the institution’s visibility and reputation in cultural spheres.

==== Kalashree ====
Kalashree is a dance club in the college that provides a platform for students who have interest in folk dance as well as classical and semi-classical dance forms of India.

==== A-Crew Unit ====
A-Crew Unit is a western dance group in the college.

==== Stellar ====
In modern era, the study of culture and human societies, studies fashion. Fashion means presenting oneself in clothing, footwear, lifestyle, accessories, makeup, and hairstyle.

=== FIC (Finance and Investment Cell) ===
Finance and Investment Cell is essentially a common platform for all finance enthusiasts to learn through knowledge sharing.

=== NSS ===
The college has a NSS unit.

=== Nimbus ===
The college has an active debating society, Nimbus (The Debaters), helping students learn the art of debating. In the published annual report from 2012, the society talks about its aim to develop visionary leaders. The society saw a major restructuring in the same year and has gained recognition in the college as well as university debating circuits.

=== Rangayan ===
The Dramatics Society, Rangayan, was founded in 2005 with the aim of inculcating in the students an appreciation for theatre and dramaturgy as well as highlighting the collective conscience as an imperative. In the fourteen years since its inception, Rangayan has worked towards staging productions that serve to entertain and educate. Rangayan organizes a three-day theatre festival at Sri Ram Centre every year, titled Rangsheersh Jaidev Natyotsav, in honour of Dr. Jaidev Taneja, a drama critic and founder of Rangayan. The Society also organizes a month-long theatre workshop for theatre enthusiasts at the beginning of the session. Rangayan is an integral part of the College's community outreach programmes as well.

=== NCC ===
ARSD NCC is one of the most active student bodies of the college. The college maintains two platoons of NCC (Army Wing) where only men can participate in NCC. Every year, cadets from the NCC units of the college are selected to participate in the Republic Day parade. Cadets have also been selected for youth change programs and participated in drills in China and Sri Lanka. Captain Sandeep Kumar is the current ANO in the college. For his exemplary and dedicated services, he was conferred with DG NCC Commendation Card in year 2021.

=== TILT ===
The Film Appreciation Society of ARSD College is a film club that holds film screenings, readings, and discussions in the college.

=== Ambedkar Study Circle ===
The theme of this study circle is to highlight the role played by 'Nation Builder Baba Sahib Bhim Rao Ambedkar'.

=== Gandhi Study Circle ===
The Gandhi Study Circle, ARSD College, is dedicated to propagate the message of Gandhiji to young students.

=== Arteysania ===
The purpose of the Art and Craft society in ARSD College is to ensure all-round personality development of the students of the College .

=== PixElation ===
PixElation is the photography society of ARSD College.

=== Enactus ===
Enactus (previously known as Students in Free Enterprise), is an international non-profit organization that works with university students to make a difference in their communities along with developing their skills to become socially responsible entrepreneurs. The college has an active Enactus chapter that undertakes various social entrepreneurship projects.

=== Women Development Cell ===
The Women Development Cell was instituted at ARSD College with the objective to mainly empower female students of the College. It believes in strengthening students by creating awareness about socio-political, cultural, and legal perspectives through talks, workshops and symposia. Through its myriad activities—street plays, creative writing, poster-making, debates, movie screenings, group discussions, gender sensitization workshops, yoga workshops, self-defense training courses — the Cell sensitizes and educates female students in a holistic manner. The Cell conducts self defense and women safety training workshop for female students.

=== Vedanta ===
Vedanta is the Hindi Debating Society of Atma Ram Sanatan Dharma College, and one of the major societies the college boasts of. Being a prominent society in the University of Delhi, and Delhi Debating Circuit, the society aims at thought development on an intellectual and logical basis, creating a base of people, including notable alumni, who are responsible and active citizens of the country, paving the way for deliberation based development. Additionally, Vedanta also bags some of the highest tally of prizes all over the region, the recent most being 280+ achievements in the 2024-25 session, in regional, national and international level debate competitions, including both, Hindi and English languages.

== Notable alumni ==
The notable alumni of the college include.

- Ramakant Goswami, minister in Delhi government
- Jaspreet Jasz, singer
- Rajkummar Rao, actor
- Sudhir Chaudhary, Senior Editor DD News
- Maithili Thakur, singer
- Ashish Sood, minister in Delhi government

== See also ==
- Education in India
- Education in Delhi
- List of institutions of higher education in Delhi
- Sanatan Dharma College
- University of Delhi
