= P. S. Sreedharan Pillai =

19th Governor of Goa (born 1954)

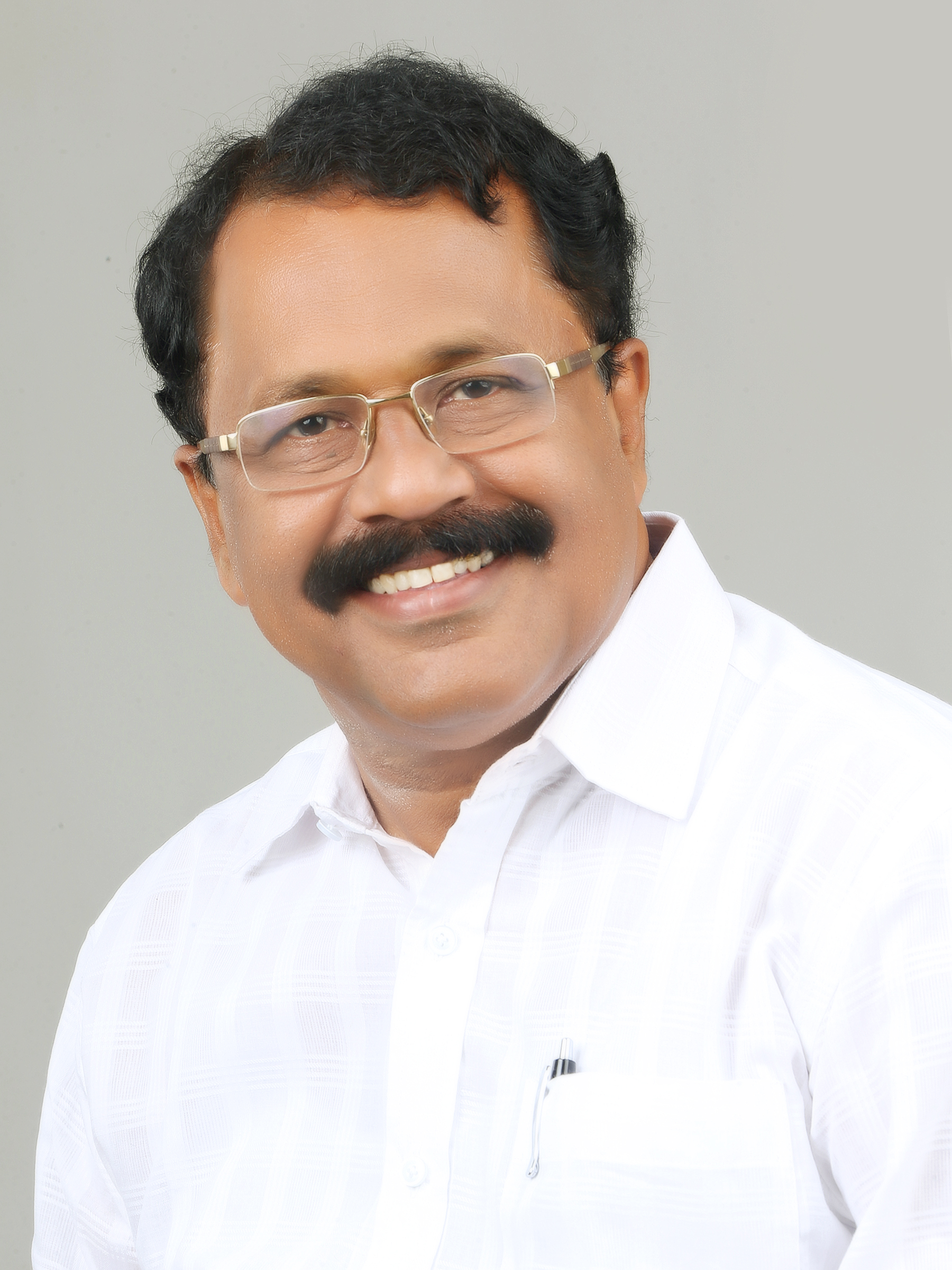
- Pillai in 2016

19th Governor of Goa
- In office 7 July 2021 – 25 July 2025
- President: Ram Nath Kovind; Droupadi Murmu
- Prime Minister: Narendra Modi
- Chief Minister: Pramod Sawant
- Preceded by: Bhagat Singh Koshyari (additional charge)
- Succeeded by: Ashok Gajapathi Raju

15th Governor of Mizoram
- In office 5 November 2019 – 6 July 2021
- Chief Minister: Zoramthanga
- Preceded by: Jagdish Mukhi
- Succeeded by: Kambhampati Hari Babu

President of Bharatiya Janata Party, Kerala
- In office 2003–2006
- In office 2018–2019

Personal details
- Born: 1 December 1954 (age 71) Venmony, Alapuzha, Kerala, India
- Party: Bharatiya Janata Party (after 2003)
- Spouse: K. Rita (m. 1984)
- Children: 2
- Education: NSS College Pandalam (BA); Government Law College, Kozhikode (LLB)
- Occupation: Politician; attorney; author
- Website: www.pssreedharanpillai.com

P. S. Sreedharan Pillai (born 1 December 1954) is an Indian politician, attorney, and author, who has served as the 19th Governor of Goa from July 2021 to July 2025. He also served as the governor of Mizoram from 2019 to 2021, he was also the Bharatiya Janata Party president of Kerala state from 2003 to 2006 and again from 2018 to 2019. He has been conferred with honorary doctorate degree by both, Alliance University, Bangalore in December 2024 and in ASBM University, Bhubaneswar on 16 September 2023 in the hands of Hon'ble 14th President of India Shri Ram Nath Kovind.

== Political career ==
Pillai started his political career through the ABVP, the student wing of the Bharatiya Janata Party. He was a state secretary of the ABVP during his college days. He has served in many posts in the BJP, including Kozhikode district president, state secretary, and general secretary. He was elected as BJP State President of BJP in Kerala from 2003 to 2006 and also served as the BJP Prabhari of Lakshadweep UT in 2004. Under his leadership, in 2004, the NDA won two MP seats from Kerala (P. C. Thomas, IFDP) and Lakshadweep (P. Pookunhi Koya, JDU). In 2018, he was again appointed the state President, preceding Kummanam Rajasekharan. He was appointed Governor of Mizoram on 25 October 2019.

== Literary career ==
Pillai took to writing nearly four decades ago, publishing his first book in 1983. He has published more than 210 books.

== Bibliography ==
=== Anthologies ===
- Kaaladanam (2005)
- Bonsai (2008)
- Pazhassismriti
- Novum Naliavutti
- Udakumbham
- Marmarangal
- Avinaabhavam
- Spadika Manikal
- Mandarangal
- Aduthoon
- Oh Mizoram (Malayalam)
- Oh Mizoram (English)
- Oh Mizoram (Hindi)
- Corona Kavithakal
- Lockdown Kavithakal

=== Folklore Poems ===
- Anchadi Thottangal
- Neerthullikal
- Nadan Mathuram
- Padheyam
- Nadan Pattukal
- Entte Priyakavithakal

=== History ===
- Punnapra Vayalar – Kanappurangal
- Adiyanthravastha Oru Ormapeduthal
- Vibhajanathinte Noottandu
- Mohajir – Desiyathayum Vikadanasakhthikalum
- Rashtranayakar
- Dark Days of Democracy (English)
- Adiyanthravastha Iruttinte Nilavilikal

=== Legal ===
- Niyamavrithaandam
- Shah Banu Begum case (English)
- Five Judgements for Common Man (English)
- UAPA Niyamathekurich
- Ghargika peedanathilninnuolla shrisamprashana
- Niyama Veedhiyiloode
- Domestic Violence (English)
- Protection of Children from Sexual Offences (English)
- Shah Commission on Emergency (English)
- Neethi Thedunna Kuttavum Sikshayum
- Niyama Visesham
- Pothu Civil Code Enthu Enthinu?
- Bharnaghatana – Punaravlokanathinte Pathayil
- Hand Book of Mental laws (English)
- Law and Psychiatry (English)
- Vakkil Diary
- Niyamavum Neethiyum
- Niyama Lekhanangal
- Kesavananda Bharati Case
- Triple Talaq (English)
- Best Bakery Case (English)
- Great Debate of Trio (English)
- Shishu samprashana niyamavum chattagalum
- Italy CharaKessu
- Ruling on Death Sentence (English)
- Ruling on Medical Negligence (English)

=== Politics ===
- Advani havalakesh sathiyavum mithiyum
- Sathyavangmoolam
- Rashtreeya Lekhannagal
- Rajanaithikam
- Rashtreeya Diary
- Congress Fascism PennHitlerum
- Oru Facebook
- Pukamarayillathe
- Palavaka
- Samasya
- Pakshabhedamillathe
- Vyadhayum Veedshanavum
- Rashtreeyathiloode
- Ezhuthu
- Utharam Thedumbol
- Current affairs (English)

=== Economy ===
- Sambathika Rangavum Kupracharanavum
- Sambathika Kazhichakal
- Note pinvalikkalum dhanarangavum
- Dhanarangam Vilayiruthumbol
- GST enna swapna shashathkaram
- Sambathika sudheekaranavum surgical strikum
- Currency rathakkalum sampathvevashthayum
- Sampathika nettagalliluda

=== Saamskarikam ===
- Nermurikal
- Saphalyam Thedunna Swathanthriyam
- Bharatheeyam
- Raman, Gandhi, Bharatheeyatha
- Nostradamus
- Matham, Rashtreeyam, Deseeyodgradhanam
- Kakshiyude Veshathil
- Five Important Speeches (English)
- Republic Day 2020 (English)
- Thus speaks the Governor (English)
- Innathe Vishayangal
- Straight Line (English)
- Justice for all, Prejudice to none (English)
- Harmonial Talk (English)
- Governor on Social Harmony (English)
- Rent Control Laws (English)
- Lushayi Kunnukal
- Nerkazyicha
- Samukika Samarasatha
- Right of Privacy (English)

=== Travelogue ===
- Lakshadeep enna marathaka depu

=== Stories/Humor ===
- Chiriyum Chinthayum Karutha Kottil (Yet to be published)
- Mizo Kathakal
- Thatha Varathirikkilla
- Kathayallaa Kathakal

=== Jeevitha Rekhakal (Milestones) ===
- Kazhichakal Kazhichapadukal
- Madela muthal Azhiikoduvare
- Prathibhakal, Prathibhasangal
- Chessinte Kuthippum Kurukkum
- Ormayile Veerendra Kumar
- Thathsamaya Chinthakal

=== Social ===
- Vilakkukalukal Evide?
- Karya Vicharam
- Dholakam
- Thuranna Kathukal
- Information Technologiyum Vyakulathkalum
- Varthamana Kurippukal
- Madhyama Kazhichapadukal
- Manushyavakashangal Innu

=== Collection of Articles ===
- Address on Goa Assembly (English)
- Parivarthanathinte Pathayiloode
- Sakhyam
- Nerinte Nerma
- Onchiyam Oru Marana Warrant
- Neethiyude Rashtreeyam
- Samakaalikam
- The Other View (English)
- Irakalum Prathikalum
- Nettil Kurungunna Malayali
- Vadhasiksha: Ariyendathum Ariyikkendathum
- Thudippukal
- Ner Rekhakal
- Neethiyude Thathwasastram
- Baluch – Mohajir Prashanagalum Pakisthanum
- Anubhavagale Nanndi
- Sir John Woodroffe
- Policy Speech In Assembly

=== Literature ===
- Sahithya Chinthakal
- Nireekshanangal, Nilapadukal
- Madhyamangal Vilayiruthumbol
- Prathibhakaliloode
- Vashikaattikal
- Goa Vimochanavum Malayalikalum
- Thuranna Manasoday
- Moonnu Mahatmakal
- Mizhi Thurkkumpol
- Keynote of the Governor (English)
- Ezhuthinntte Vazhikal
- Muka Kurupukal
- Chimbai
- Proclamation by President Article 356 (English)
- Akashaveethiyiloode
- Lushayil ninnum Dona Pauleilekku
- Olliminnum Ormakalilooda October
- Goa Via Mizoram (English)
- 30 days of Mission Humanity (English)
- Governor addresses Goa (English)
- Kathayalla Kathakal (Yet to be published)
- My One year in Goa (Coffee table book) (Yet to be published)
- Convocation Speeches (Yet to be published)
- Mukapusthaka Kurupukal (Yet to be published
- My visits to Goan villages (Yet to be published)
- Justice Annachandy (Yet to be published)
- Sreeranthangal (Yet to be published)
- Dashinenthiyan Shetharagalilooda (Yet to be published)
- Meet the press (Yet to be published)
- Gujarat Vidhi (Yet to be published)
- Nammudea Bharanakadana (Yet to be published)
- Canacona Village (Yet to be published)
- Ponda Village (Yet to be published)
- Ayodhya Verdict (Yet to be published)
- Ormakale Shuthi
- Convocation Address – Mizoram University
- Influence of Literature on National Integration
- Nava Maadhyamatthiloode
- Vilayirutthumbol
- Care and Good Health
- Impressions
- Convocation Speech SaradaKrishna Homeopathy College
- Convocation Address at P K Das Medical College
- Convocation Speech at Dale View College
- Mera Hindi Bhashan
- Sthreerathnangal
- Dakhinendian Kshethrangaliloode.
- Nammude Bharanaghadana
- Aazaadi kaa Amrithmaholsav
- Swaathanthryatthinte Vajrajubile
- Need of Spiritual & Village Tourism in Goa
- Convocation Address - Goa University
- Convocation Address – NIT College, Goa
- Goa Sampurna Yatra
- Whither The Literature
- My Sixteen Months As Governor
- Goa Raj Bhavan = Lok Bhavan
- Face To Face
- Anthology Of Official Addresses
- Orations On Education
- Fragmented Thoughts
- May Light Lead Us
- Musings On Social & Economic Issues
- Protect Sovereignty
- Anthology Of Speeches
- Ezhuthazham@182
- Yes We Can
- Striking A Chord
- Madhyamagale Nanni
- Kayazhichapadukal
- Social Mediayiloode
- Prayanam

== Personal life ==
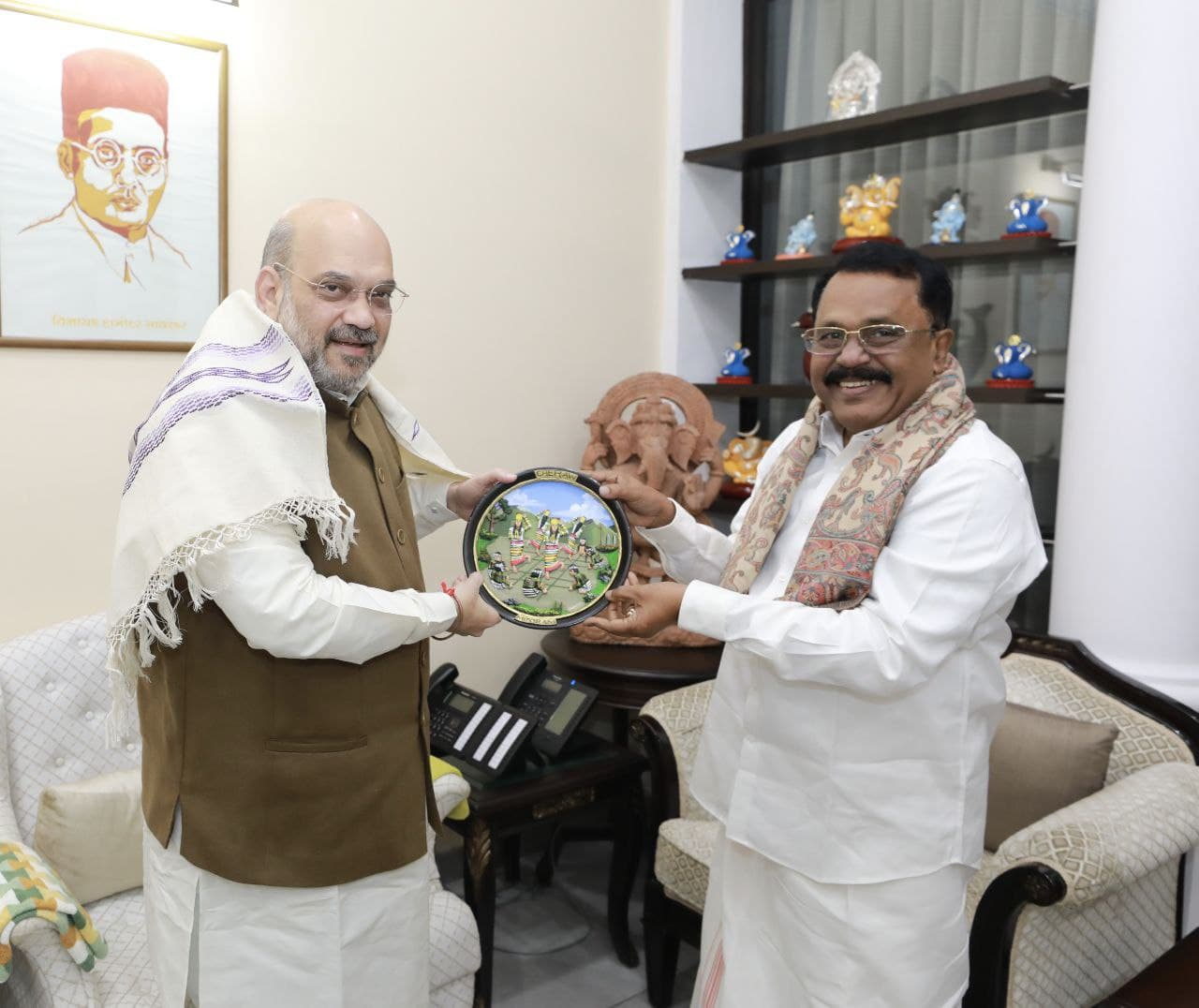
P.S. Sreedharan Pillai Meeting Hon. Home Minister of India Shri. Amit Shah at his residence

Pillai married Advocate K. Rita at Kozhikode in 1984, who is a practicing lawyer at the District Court Kozhikode. Pillai's son, Arjun Sreedhar, is a lawyer at the High Court of Kerala and began his career as a junior to his father. His daughter-in-law, Jipsa Arjun, holds a postgraduate degree in pediatric dentistry and practices in Calicut. His daughter, Arya Arun, is a postgraduate in Dental Science and practices in Cochin, while her husband, Arun Krishna Dhan, is also a lawyer at the High Court of Kerala, having started his career as a junior to his father-in-law.

Government offices
Preceded by Jagdish Mukhi; Additional Charge	Governor of Mizoram; 5 November 2019 - 6 July 2021	Succeeded by Kambhampati Hari Babu
Preceded by Bhagat Singh Koshyari; Additional Charge	Governor of Goa; 7 July 2021 - 25 July 2025	Succeeded by Ashok Gajapathi Raju
