= Devendra Kumar Joshi =

Former lieutenant governor of Andaman and Nicobar Islands (born 1954)

Admiral Devendra Kumar Joshi PVSM, AVSM, YSM, VSM, NM
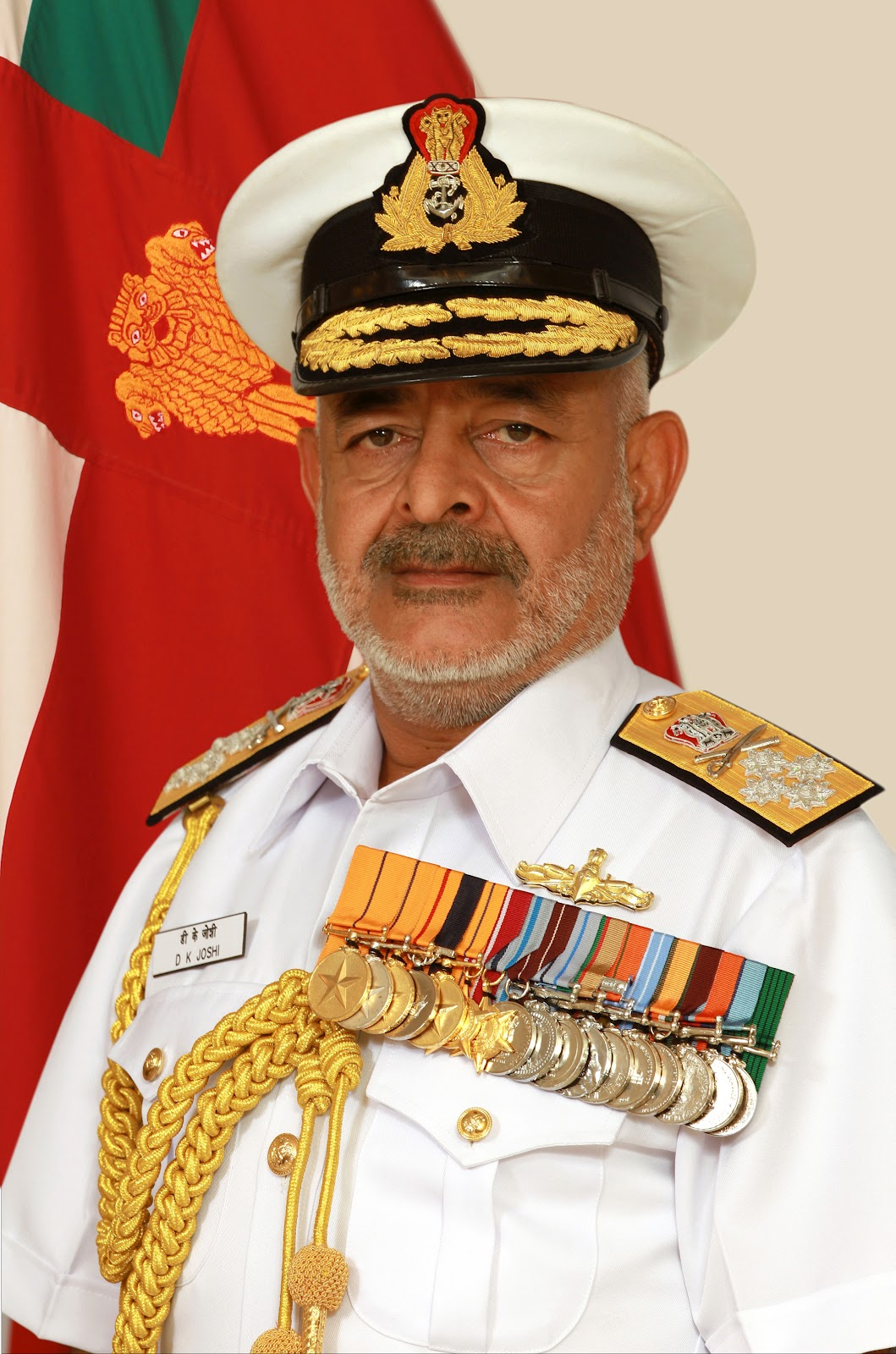
- Official portrait, 2012

14th Lieutenant Governor of the Andaman and Nicobar Islands
- In office 8 October 2017 – 14 September 2026
- President: Ram Nath Kovind; Droupadi Murmu
- Preceded by: Jagdish Mukhi
- Succeeded by: Dinesh Sharma

21st chief of the naval staff
- In office 31 August 2012 – 26 February 2014
- Appointed by: Pranab Mukherjee
- Preceded by: Nirmal Kumar Verma
- Succeeded by: Robin K. Dhowan

Personal details
- Born: 4 July 1954 (age 72) Almora, Uttarakhand, India
- Party: Independent
- Occupation: Naval officer
- Awards: Param Vishisht Seva Medal; Ati Vishisht Seva Medal; Yudh Seva Medal; Nausena Medal; Vishisht Seva Medal

Military service
- Allegiance: India
- Branch/service: Indian Navy
- Years of service: 1974–2014
- Rank: Admiral
- Commands: Western Naval Command; Andaman and Nicobar Command; Eastern Fleet; INS Viraat (R22); INS Ranvir (D54); INS Kuthar (P46)

Admiral Devendra Kumar Joshi, PVSM, AVSM, YSM, NM, VSM (born 4 July 1954) was the 14th Lieutenant Governor of Andaman and Nicobar Islands from 2017 to 2026 and the Vice Chairman of Islands Development Agency (IDA). He was an admiral in the Indian Navy and served as the 21st Chief of Naval Staff of the Indian Navy, having assumed office on 31 August 2012. He is a specialist in anti-submarine warfare. He resigned on 26 February 2014, taking responsibility for a series of accidents, thus becoming the first Indian Navy Chief to resign.

Admiral Joshi has joined the Uttarakhand War Memorial as one of its patrons in May 2020. Subsequently, paying homage to brave sons/daughters of Uttarakhand in security of the nation and furthering the cause of the Uttarakhand War Memorial Trust, he has also contributed all his current and future annuities (for gallantry awards/decorations) towards the trust in July 2020.

== Early life ==
Devendra Kumar Joshi was born on 4 July 1954 in Almora, Uttarakhand to Hira Ballabh Joshi, an Indian Forest Service (IFS) officer, and Hansa Joshi, a housewife. After completing his early education in various schools wherever his father was posted, he moved to Hansraj College of the University of Delhi. While studying in Delhi, he was selected into the Executive Branch of the Indian Navy in January 1972 and was subsequently commissioned in 1974.

In an interview with Doordarshan, when asked why he had chosen to join the Navy, he replied, "I think it was the lure of the seas, the pull of the unknown...we belong to the hills. Of the land, the hilly terrains, one had seen enough!" As he also said in the same interview, "from both my father's side and my mother's side, for seven generations nobody had been in the Services. Therefore, they [my parents] had not even thought of the Armed Forces as a career option for me. However, once I had made up my mind, they were fully supportive".

== Military career ==
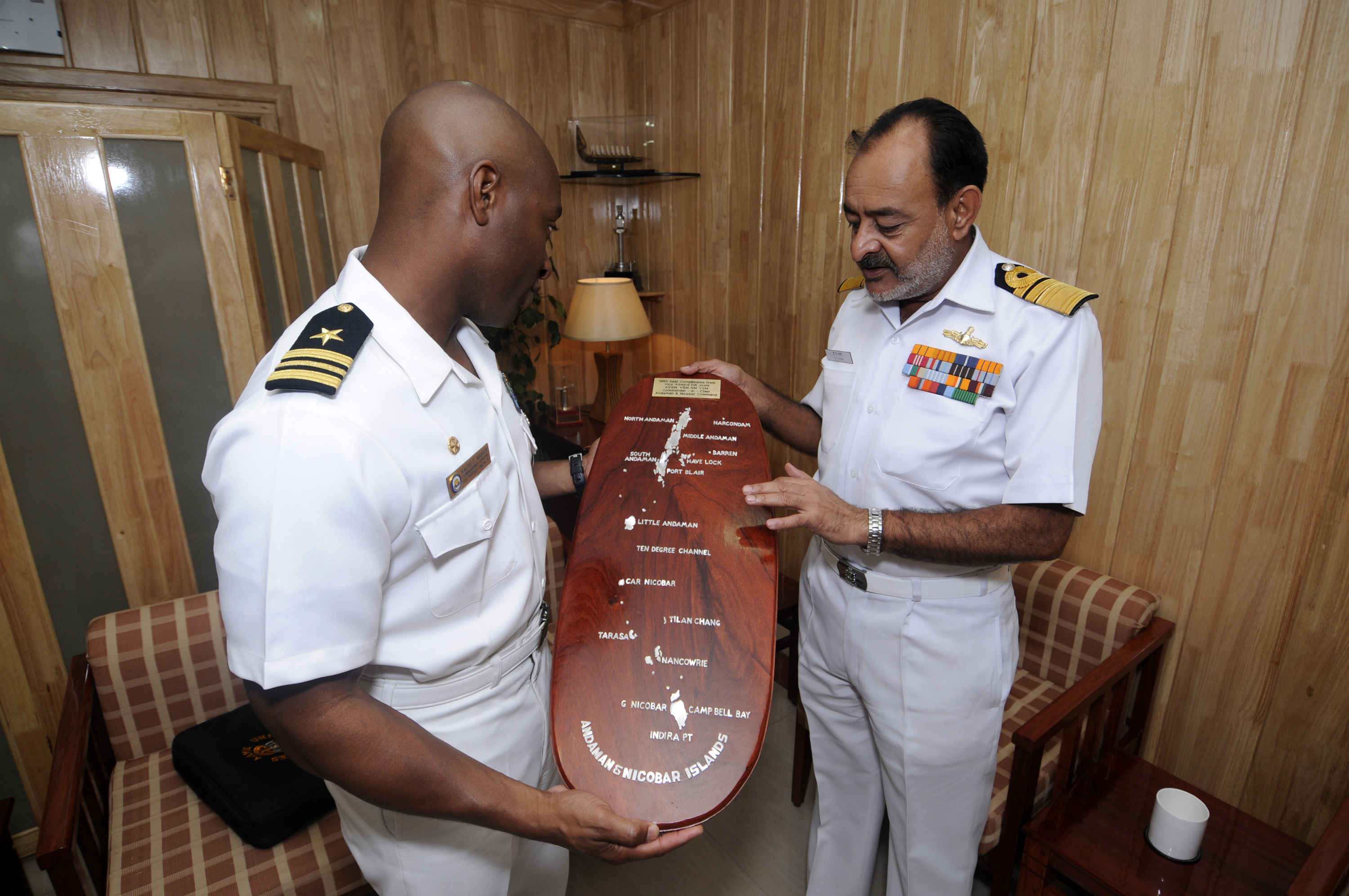
Indian Navy Vice Admiral D. K. Joshi (right) as the commander-in-chief of the Andaman and Nicobar Command

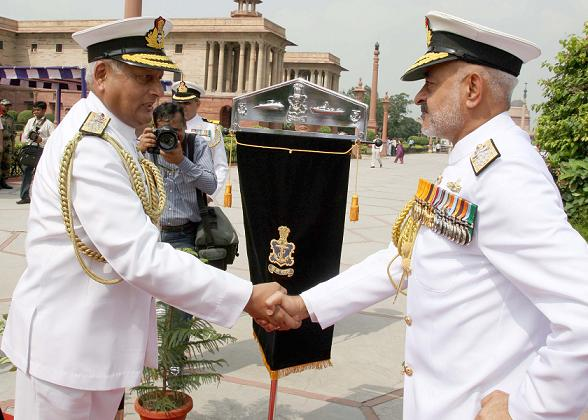
Admiral D. K. Joshi CNS Designate being welcomed by Outgoing CNS Admiral Nirmal Kumar Verma for a ceremonial Parade at South Block, New Delhi

Joshi graduated from the Indian Naval Academy and was commissioned into the executive branch of the Indian Navy on 1 April 1974. He is also an alumnus of the Naval War College, Newport, Rhode Island, the College of Naval Warfare, Goa, and the National Defence College, New Delhi.

=== Chief of Naval Staff ===
Subsequently, Joshi was elevated as the 21st Chief of Naval Staff of the Indian Navy, having assumed office on 31 August 2012.

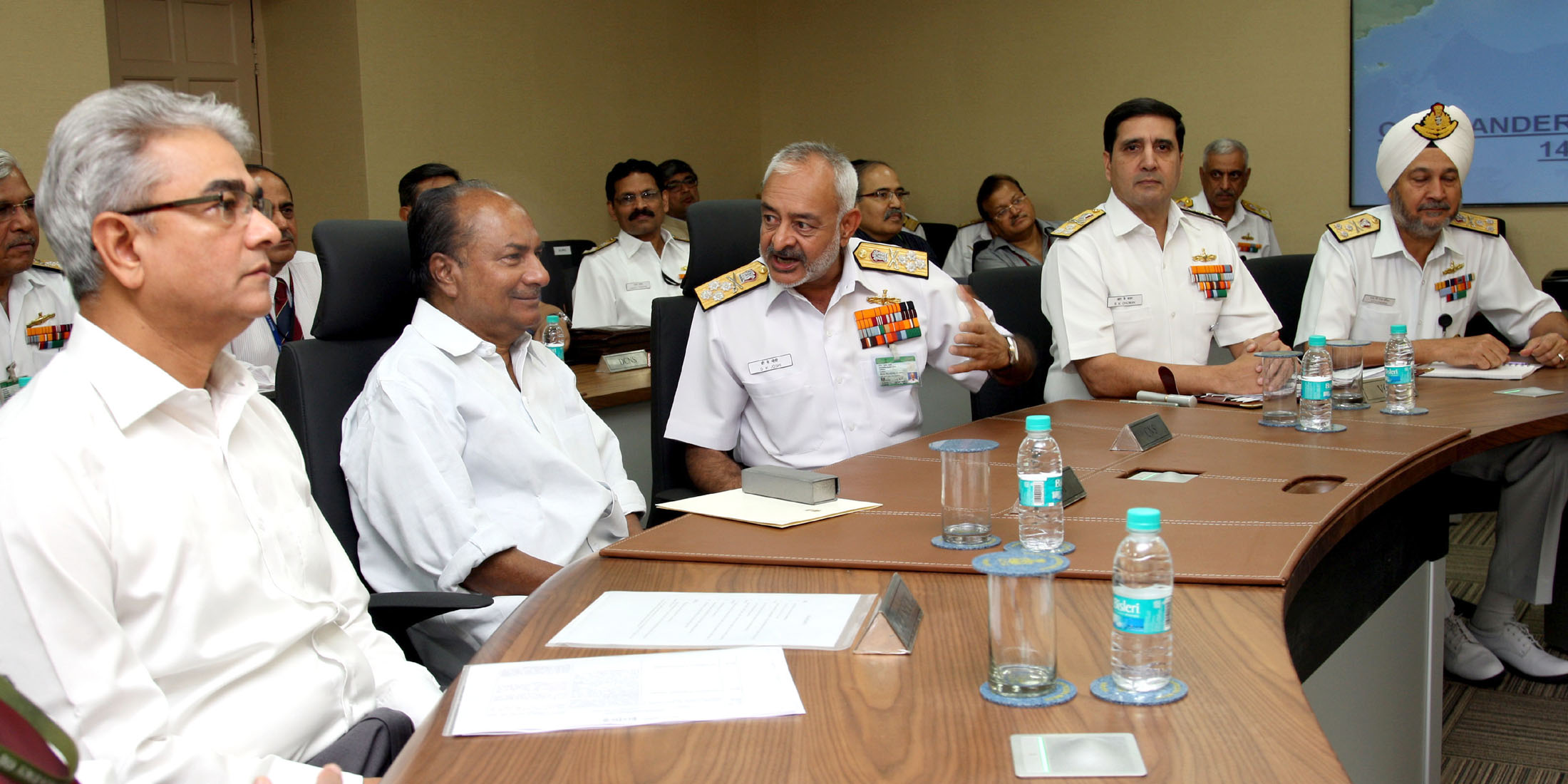
Admiral D. K. Joshi (centre) with the then Defence Minister A. K. Antony and the then Defence Secretary Shashi Kant Sharma (extreme-left).

Admiral Joshi resigned following a fire aboard Kilo-class submarine INS Sindhuratna on 26 February 2014. The Times of India wrote that Admiral D. K. Joshi, who was to serve as the Navy Chief till August 2015, "was a hard taskmaster who always ran tight ships. He was unforgiving as a commanding officer wherever he served, tightening screws wherever he went." Many naval officers felt that he had lived up to his own exacting standards by resigning.

== Lieutenant Governor of Andaman and Nicobar Islands ==
Joshi took oath on 8 October 2017 as the fourteenth Lieutenant Governor of the Andaman and Nicobar Islands, a territory which is the largest archipelago system in the Bay of Bengal, composed of 836 islands, islets and rocks. He concurrently remains designated as Vice-Chairman Islands Development Agency also.

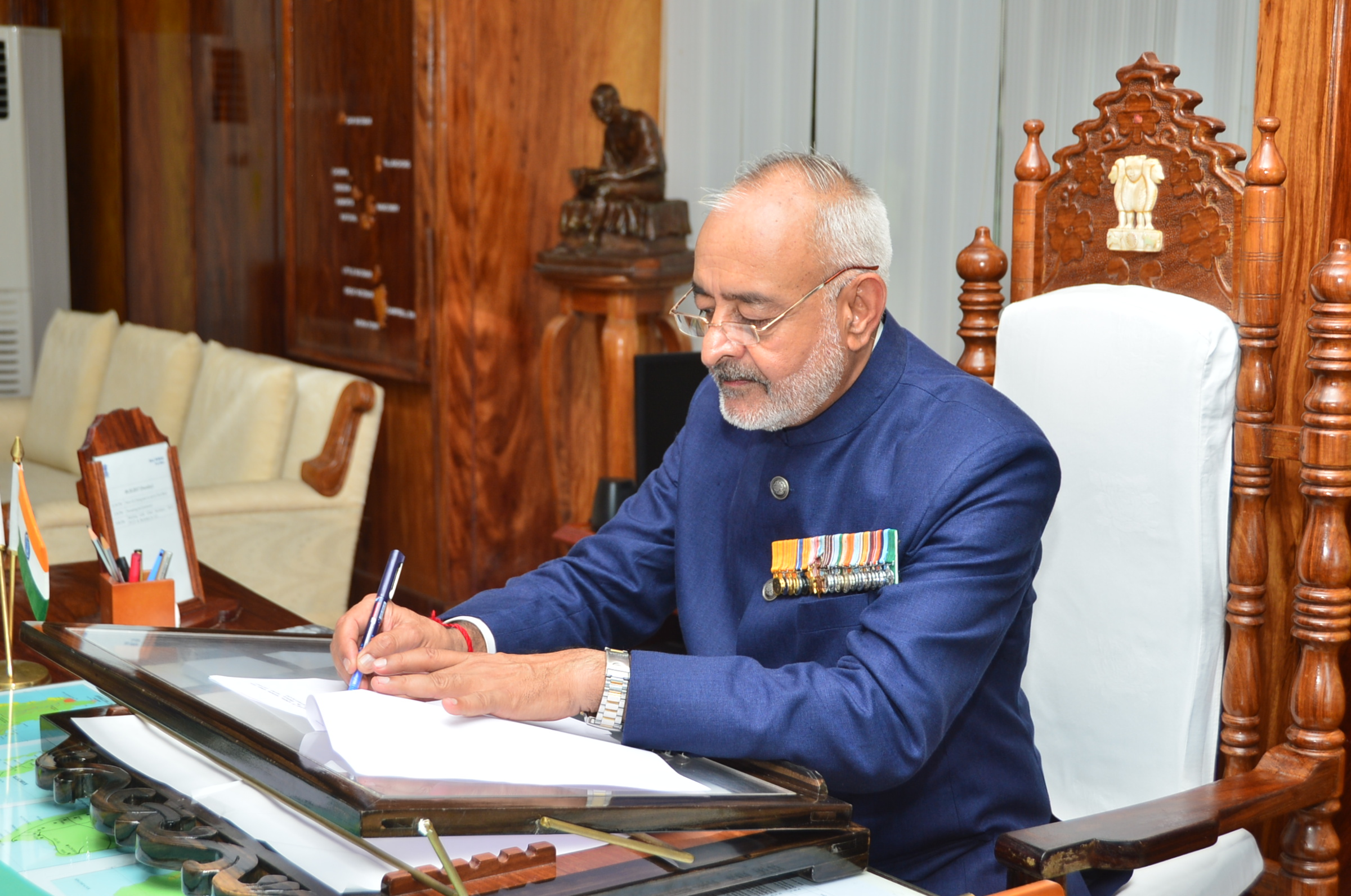
Assumed charge on 8th October 2017 as the Fourteenth Lieutenant Governor of the Andaman and Nicobar Islands

Islands Development Agency

The Islands Development Agency (IDA) was constituted on 1 June 2017 under the Chairmanship of Home Minister Rajnath Singh, and Admiral D. K. Joshi was designated as its Vice-Chairman, following the Prime Minister Narendra Modi's review meeting on the development of Indian Islands Territories. The major mandate of the Islands Development Agency includes guiding policies, programs, and the formulation of Integrated Master Plans for the comprehensive development of the Islands. Islands Development Agency, with the support of the NITI Aayog, is undertaking the holistic development of the Islands territories of India, while giving due consideration to their unique maritime and territorial biodiversity.

The first IDA Meeting was held on 24 July 2017. IDA has so far met six times since its constitution, with the fourth review meeting held on 30 June 2018, being chaired by the Hon’ble Prime Minister of India himself. With the re-constitution of the Islands Development Agency, the Government of India has been fast-tracking the holistic development of its island territories.

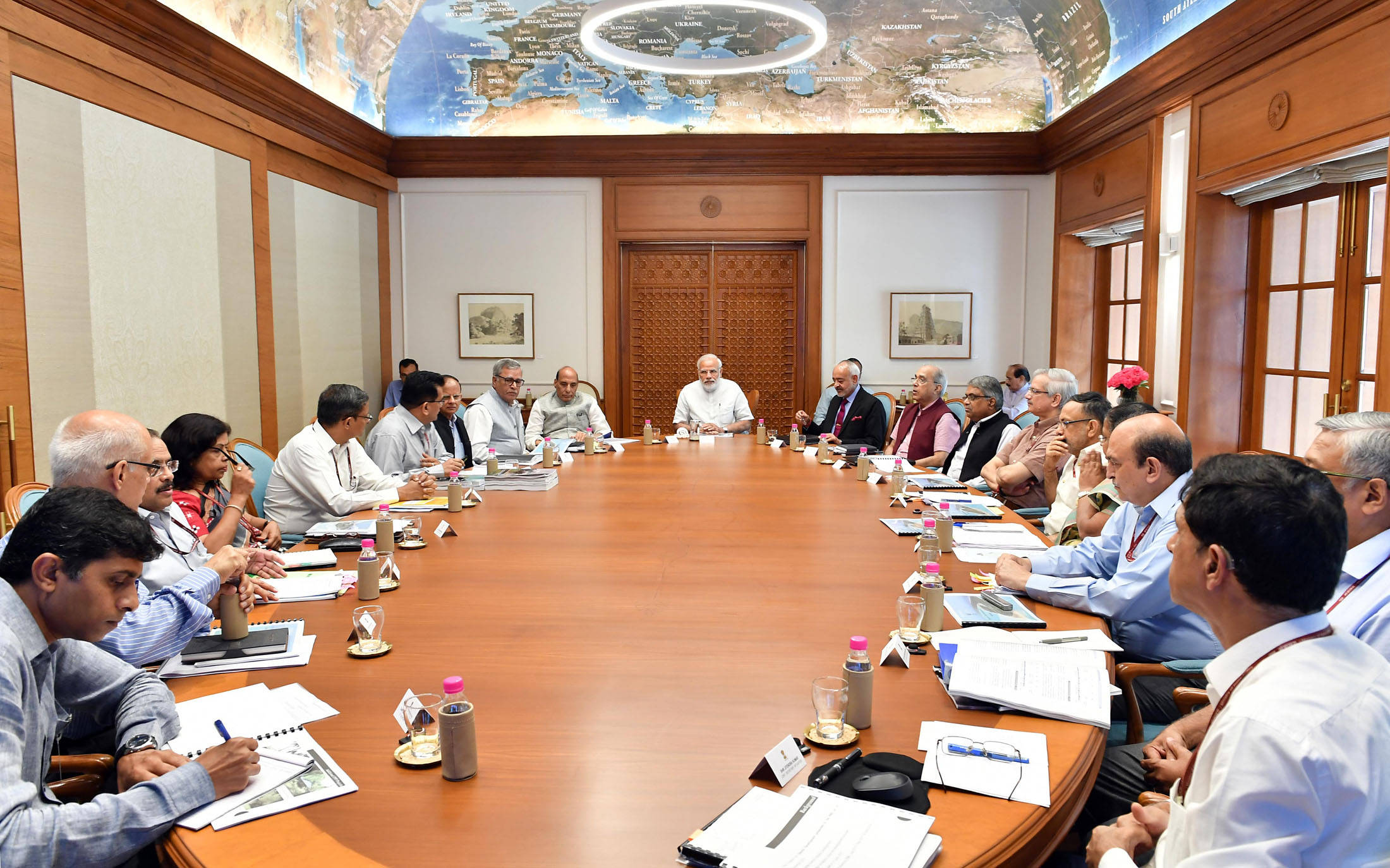
The fourth IDA Review Meeting taken by the Prime Minister of India on 30 June 2018, with Chairman IDA Hon’ble Home Minister and Vice-Chairman Admiral D. K. Joshi present.

The Prime Minister of India, Shri Narendra Modi, inaugurated the New Integrated Terminal Building of Veer Savarkar International Airport, Sri Vijaya Puram, via video conferencing on 18 July 2023. With a construction cost of around INR 710 crores, the new terminal building is capable of handling about 50 lakh passengers annually. Earlier, the terminal had the capacity to handle 4000 tourists, and the new terminal has taken this number to 11,000 and 10 planes can be parked at any given time on the airport now.

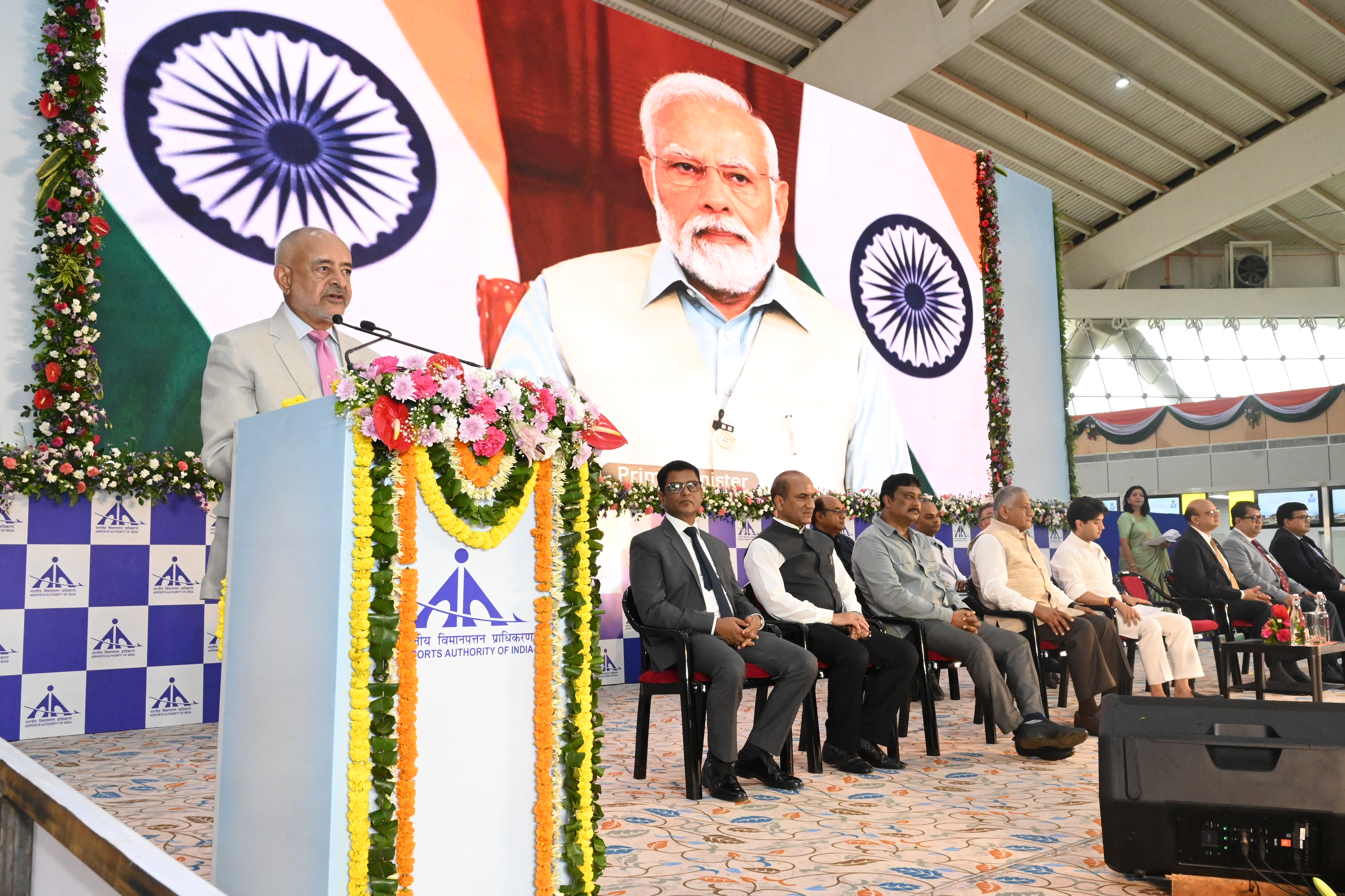
Inauguration of the New Integrated Terminal Building of Veer Savarkar International Airport, Port Blair on 18th July 2023

Great Nicobar Island Development Project is a planned mega-infrastructure project for the southern tip of Great Nicobar Island in Andaman Sea of India. The island comes under the Nicobar district administration in the Indian union territory of Andaman and Nicobar Islands.

The International Container Transshipment Port (ICTP), also called the Galathea Bay Port is a proposed container transshipment port at Galathea Bay, Great Nicobar Island in the union territory of Andaman and Nicobar Islands, India, to be constructed at a cost of ₹44,000 crore. It has a natural depth of more than 20 meter. It is developed by the Ministry of Ports, Shipping and Waterways under the Government of India. In September 2024, it was officially notified as the 13th major port of India. The first phase of development is expected to be commissioned in 2028.

== Guinness World Records ==
To position the A & N Islands as a global scuba diving hub, Admiral D.K. Joshi conceptualized two Guinness World Records attempts, both of which were successfully achieved and officially recognized. He also participated in both record-setting events as the lead diver.

The Largest National Flag Unfurled Underwater was achieved at Radhanagar Beach, Swaraj Dweep, on 2^{nd} May 2026.

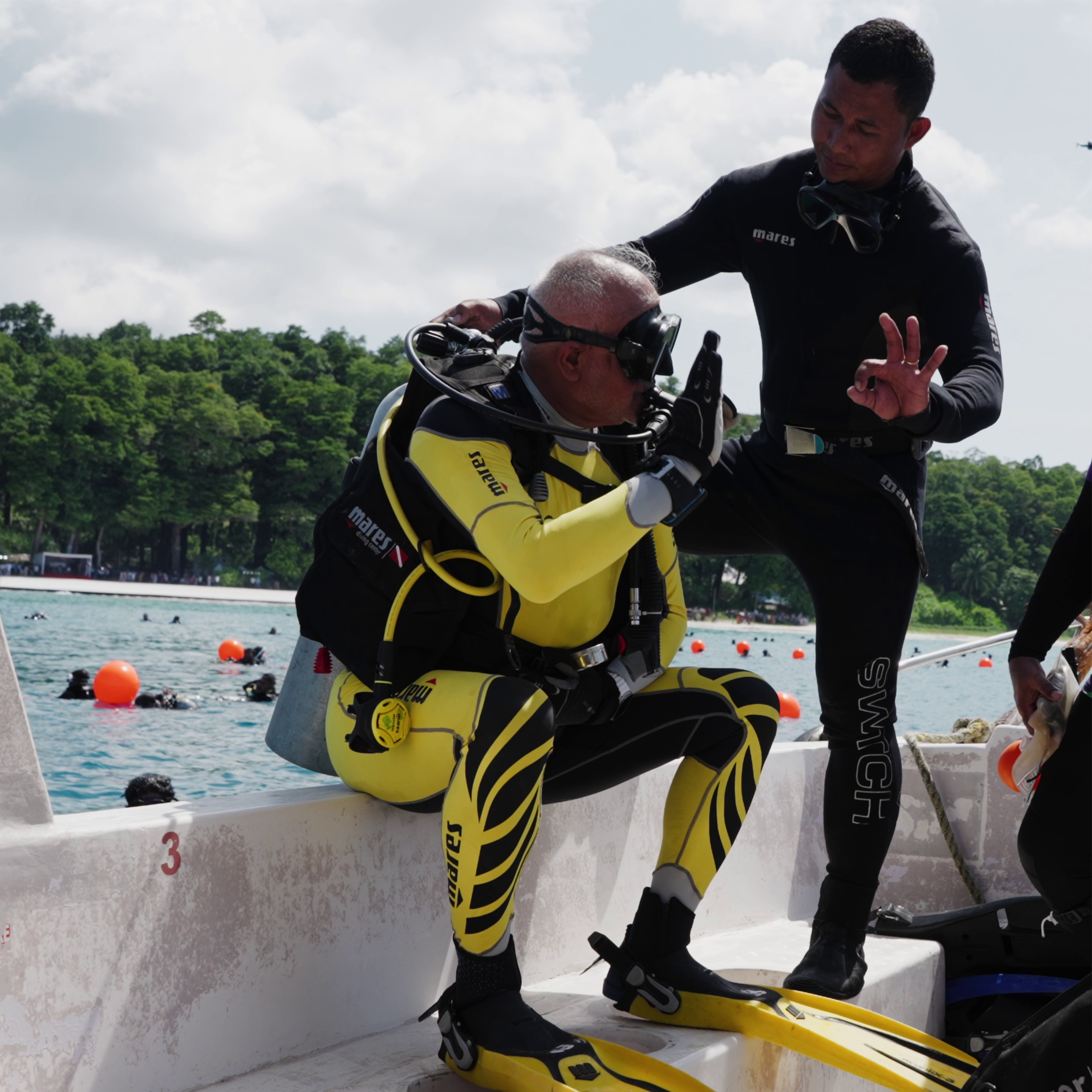
Geared up for GWR attempt:Largest Flag Unfurled Underwater.

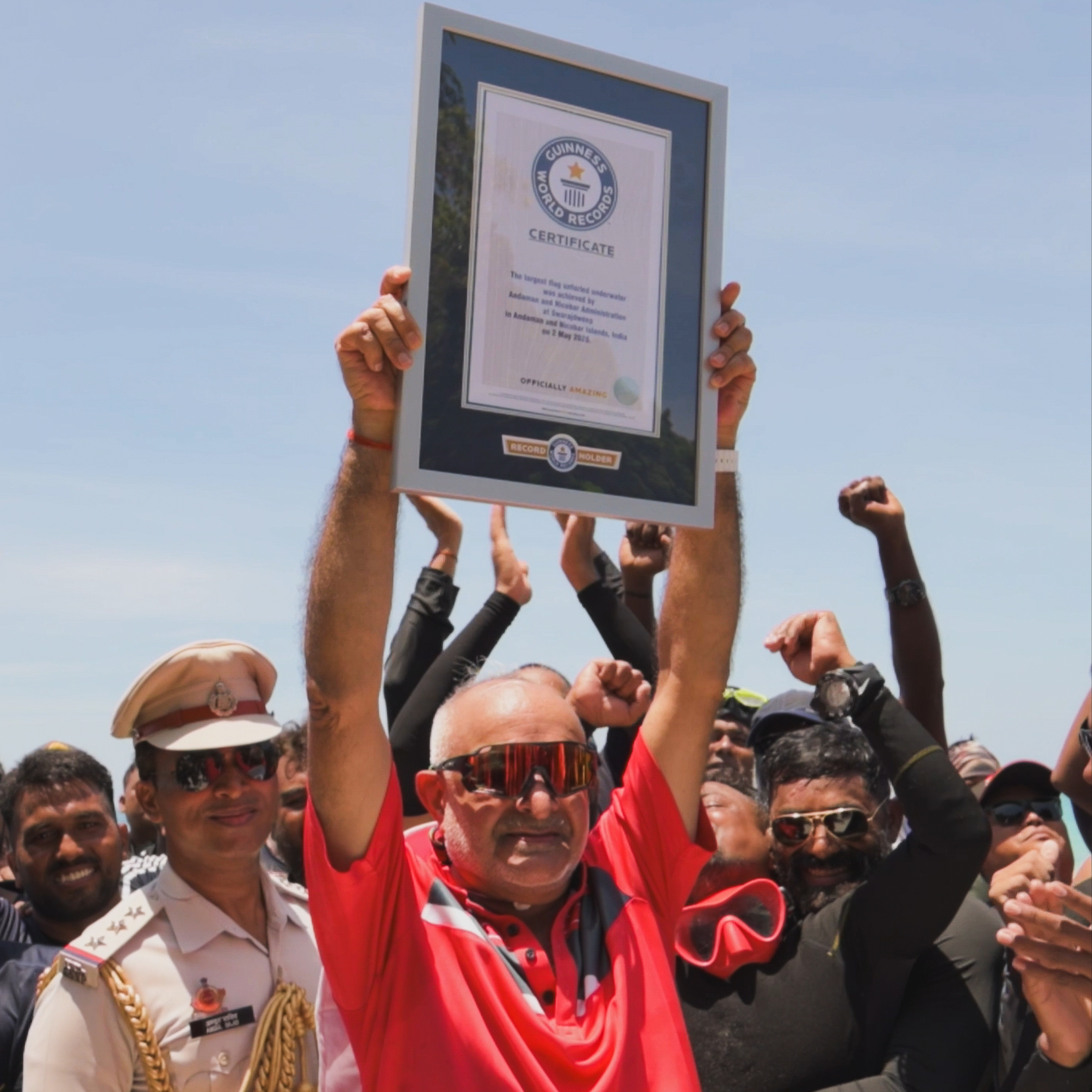
Receiving GWR Certificate: Largest Flag Unfurled Underwater.

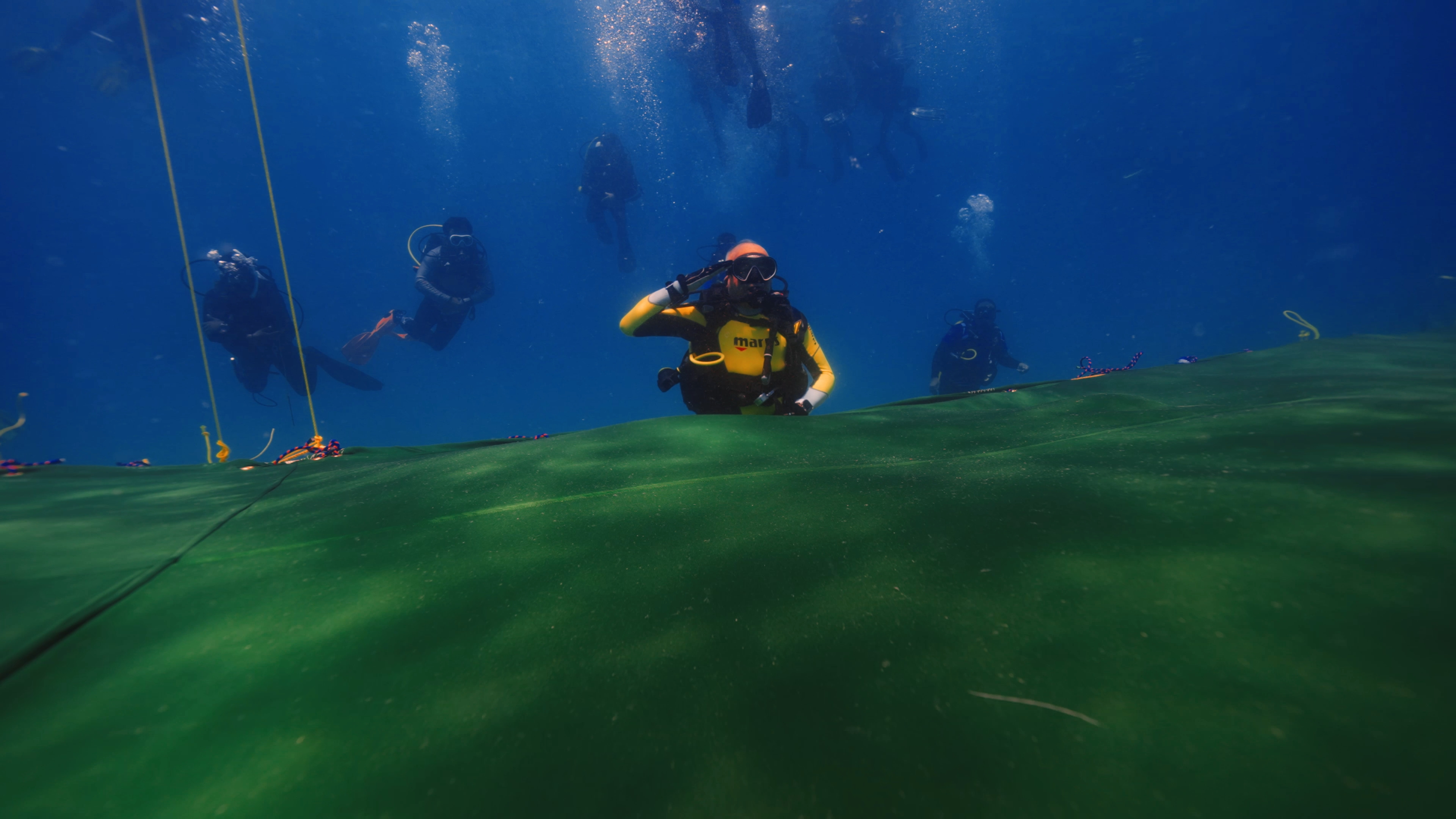
Saluting National Flag Underwater.

The Tallest Human Stack Underwater was achieved at Swaraj Dweep on 3^{rd} May 2026,

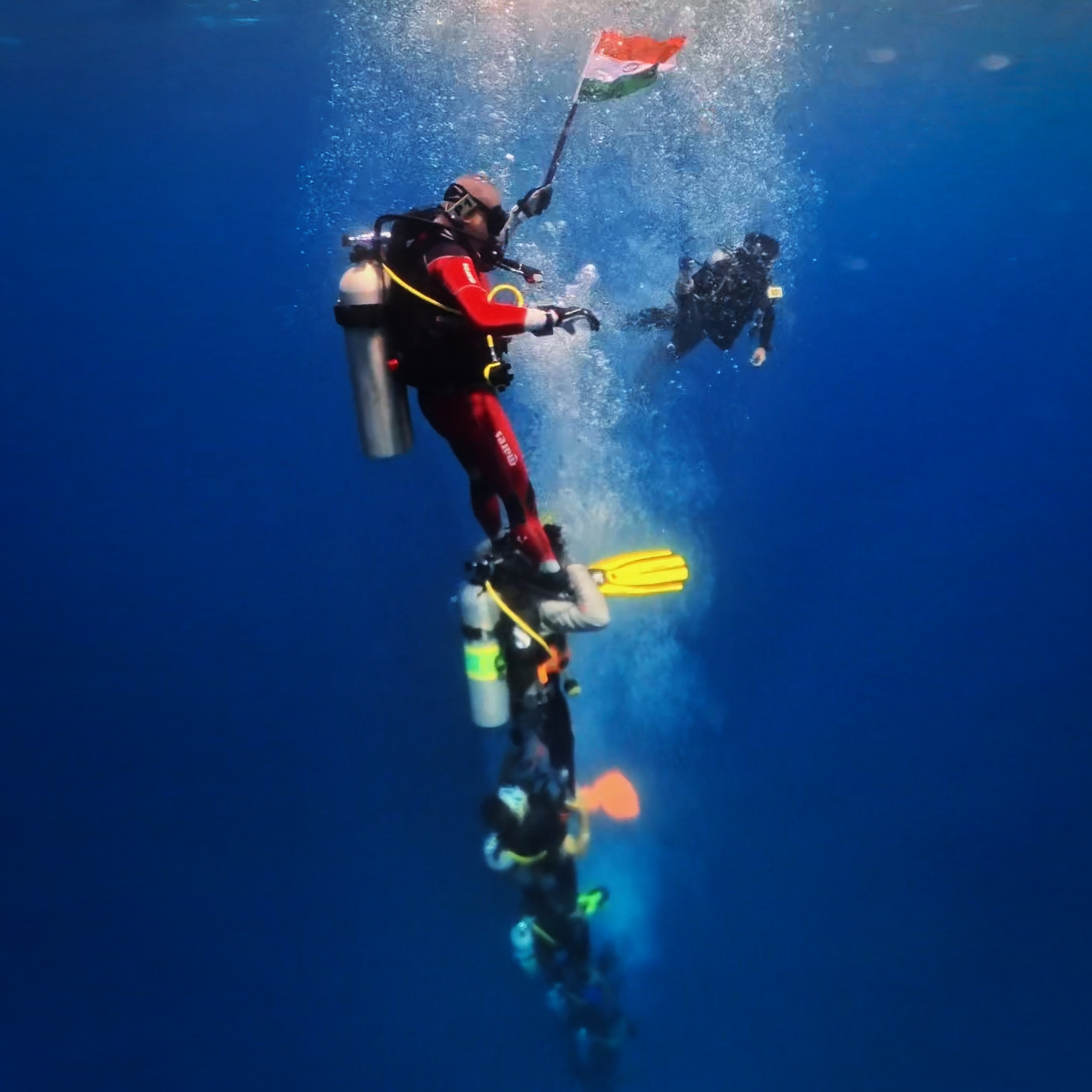
GWR:Tallest Human Stack Underwater.

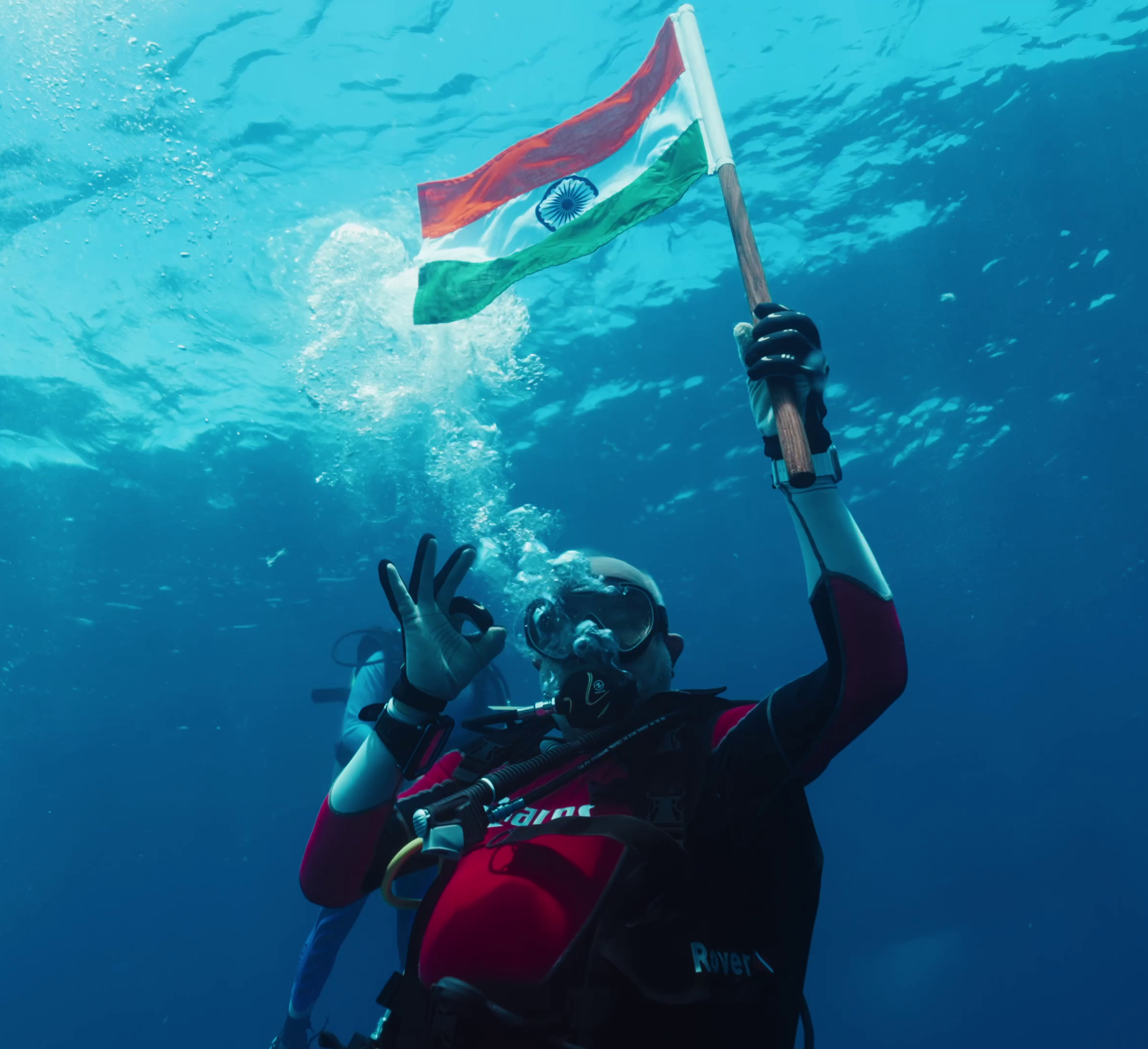
Completing the GWR:Tallest Human Stack Underwater.

== Offshore Oil and Natural Gas Exploration ==
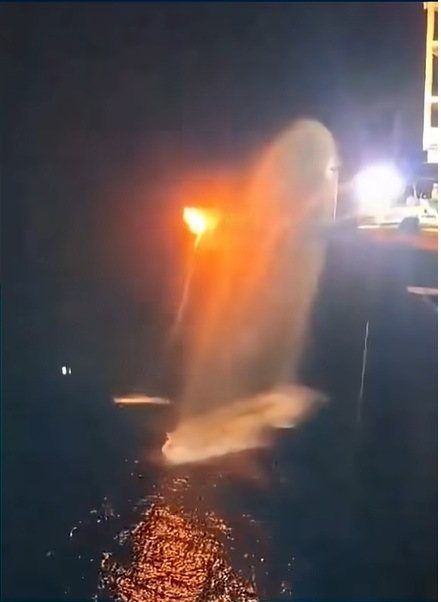
Oil and Natural Gas Corporation (ONGC) reported presence of Natural Gas at the SVP-3 well on 5th June 2026 in Andaman Basin

Despite the A & N Islands accounting for nearly one-third of India's Exclusive Economic Zone (EEZ) and approximately one-fourth of its coastline, virtually no offshore hydrocarbon exploration around the islands took place until 2020, because most of the surrounding waters had been designated a "No-Go Zone".

Admiral Joshi raised the issue with the concerned ministries and also projected it during the 5^{th} and 6^{th} meetings of the Islands Development Agency (IDA) in 2020, following which large areas of the surrounding waters were opened for offshore exploration.

Consequently, Oil India Limited (OIL) reported natural gas samples containing approximately 87% methane from the Sri Vijay Puram-2 well in late 2025. Further, Oil and Natural Gas Corporation (ONGC) also found crude condensate while drilling a Stratigraphic well in offshore block AND-P-1 on 27^{th} Jan 2026, and OIL subsequently reported presence of natural gas at the SVP-3 well on 5^{th} June 2026.

== Military decorations ==
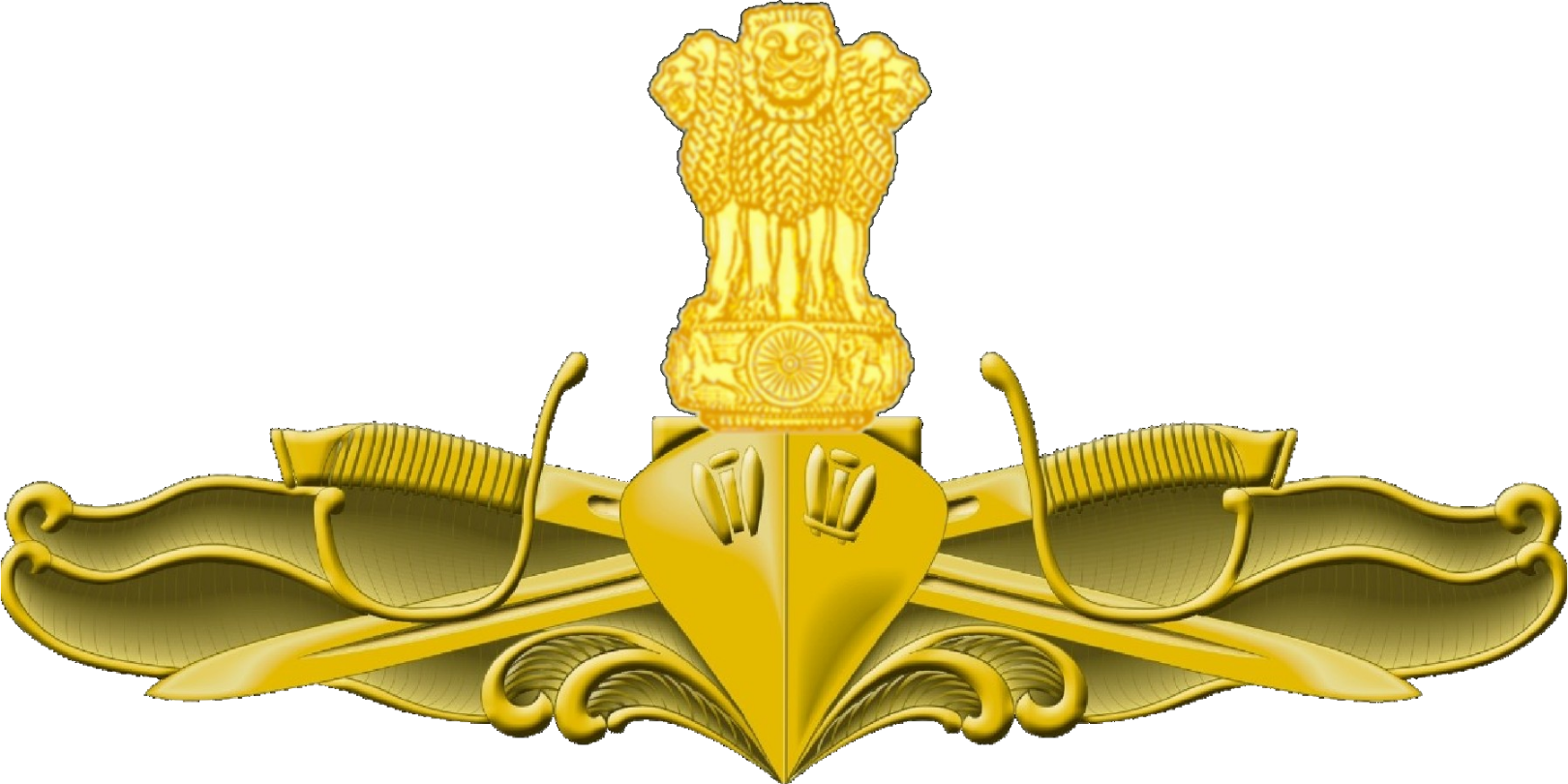

Surface warfare badge
Param Vishisht Seva Medal	Ati Vishisht Seva Medal	Yudh Seva Medal	Nausena Medal
Vishisht Seva Medal	Paschimi Star	Operation Vijay Star	Sangram Medal
Operation Vijay Medal	Operation Parakram Medal	Sainya Seva Medal	50th Anniversary of Independence Medal
25th Anniversary of Independence Medal	30 Years Long Service Medal	20 Years Long Service Medal	9 Years Long Service Medal

Military offices
Preceded by R. F. Contractor	Commanding officer INS Viraat; 2001 - 2003	Succeeded by Anil Chopra
Preceded by Sanjeev Bhasin	Flag Officer Commanding Eastern Fleet; 2006 - 2007	Succeeded by Robin Dhowan
Preceded by Vijay Shankar	Commander-in-Chief, Andaman and Nicobar Command; 2009 - 2010	Succeeded by Lieutenant General N. C. Marwah
Preceded by Air Marshal S. C. Mukul	Chief of Integrated Defence Staff; 2010 - 2011	Succeeded by Shekhar Sinha
Preceded by Sanjeev Bhasin	Flag Officer Commanding-in-Chief Western Naval Command; 2011 - 2012	Succeeded by Shekhar Sinha
Preceded by Nirmal Kumar Verma	Chief of the Naval Staff; 2012 - 2014	Succeeded by Robin Dhowan
Government offices
Preceded by Jagdish Mukhi	Lieutenant Governor of Andaman and Nicobar; 8 October 2017 - Present	Succeeded by Incumbent
