= Rajesh Rishi =

Member of the Delhi Legislative Assembly

Member of the Delhi Legislative Assembly for Janakpuri
- In office February 2015 – February 2025
- Preceded by: Jagdish Mukhi
- Succeeded by: Ashish Sood

Personal details
- Born: 18 October 1964 (age 61) Jalandhar
- Party: Bharatiya Janata Party (From February 2025)
- Other political affiliations: Aam Aadmi Party (till January 2025) Independent
- Children: 1 son and 1 daughter
- Parent(s): Rajender Kumar Rishi (father), Shobha Rishi (Mother)
- Education: Agra University
- Profession: Politician & Businessman

Rajesh Rishi (born 18 October 1964) is an Indian politician and member of the Sixth Legislative Assembly of Delhi, India. He formerly represented the Janakpuri constituency of Delhi.

He is the former Parliamentary Secretary (Health) Government of NCT of Delhi. He is a sitting Member and Chair of the Standing Committees of Transport, IT, Tourism and Administrative Reforms in the Government of NCT of Delhi.

== Early life and education ==
Rajesh Rishi was born in Jalandhar on 18 October 1965. He attended Agra University and was awarded a Bachelor of Science degree in 1985.

== Political career ==
Rishi first contested an election in 2013. He was elected as a MLA in Delhi in 2015 for the Janakpuri constituency.

Rishi resigned from the Aam Aadmi Party on 31 January 2025 ahead of 2025 Delhi Legislative Assembly election and joined Bharatiya Janata Party on 1 February 2025 in the presence of BJP's national vice-president and the in-charge of Delhi Baijayant Panda, and state president Virendra Sachdeva.

== See also ==
- Politics of India

== Electoral performance ==
Delhi Assembly elections, 2020: Janakpuri
Party	Candidate	Votes	%	±%
AAP	Rajesh Rishi	67,968	54.43	−3.29
BJP	Ashish Sood	53,051	42.48	+5.33
INC	Radhika Khera	2,084	1.67	−2.10
BSP	Raj Kumar	505	0.40	+0.03
NOTA	None of the above	691	0.55	+0.17
Majority		14,917	11.95	−8.62
Turnout		1,24,989	65.85	+0.39
AAP hold		Swing	-3.29	

State Legislative Assembly
Preceded by ?	Member of the Delhi Legislative Assembly from Janakpuri Assembly constituency 2020–	Incumbent
