= Jagdish Mukhi =

Indian politician (born 1942)

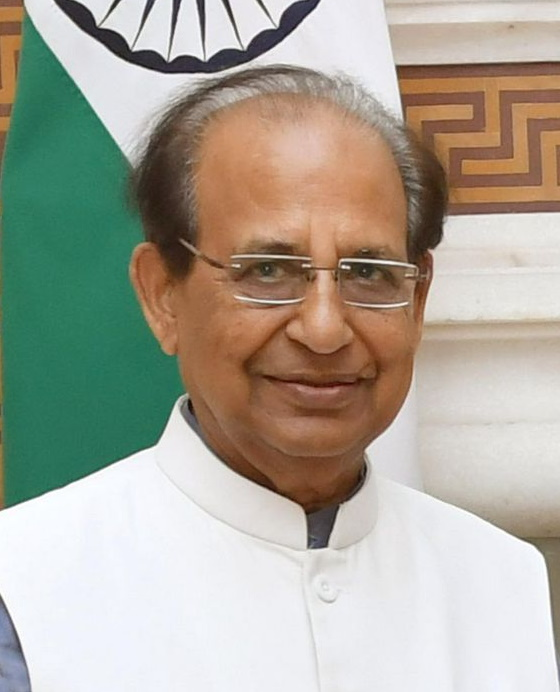
- Mukhi in 2023

28th Governor of Assam
- In office 10 October 2017 – 20 February 2023
- Chief Minister: Sarbananda Sonowal; Himanta Biswa Sarma
- Preceded by: Banwarilal Purohit
- Succeeded by: Gulab Chand Kataria

Governor of Nagaland
- Additional Charge
- In office 17 September 2021 – 19 February 2023
- Chief Minister: Neiphiu Rio
- Preceded by: R. N. Ravi
- Succeeded by: La. Ganesan

Governor of Mizoram
- Additional Charge
- In office 8 March 2019 – 25 October 2019
- Chief Minister: Zoramthanga
- Preceded by: Kummanam Rajasekharan
- Succeeded by: P. S. Sreedharan Pillai

13th Lieutenant Governor of Andaman and Nicobar Islands
- In office 22 August 2016 – 7 October 2017
- Preceded by: A. K. Singh
- Succeeded by: Devendra Kumar Joshi

Member of Delhi Legislative Assembly
- In office 1993–2015
- Preceded by: Constituency established
- Succeeded by: Rajesh Rishi
- Constituency: Janakpuri

Minister of Finance, Planning, Excise, Taxation and Higher Education of Delhi
- In office 12 October 1998 – 3 December 1998
- Chief Minister: Sushma Swaraj

Personal details
- Born: 1 December 1942 (age 83) Dajal, Punjab, British India (present-day Punjab, Pakistan)
- Party: Bharatiya Janata Party
- Other political affiliations: National Democratic Alliance
- Spouse: Prem Grover (m. 1970)
- Children: 2
- Education: B.Com (Hons) from Matsya University; M.Com/Ph.D (Finance) from Delhi University

Prof. Jagdish Mukhi (born 1 December 1942) is an Indian politician who served as the 28th Governor of Assam from 2017 to 2023, the Governor of Nagaland (Additional Charge) from 2021 to 2023 and the Governor of Mizoram on 2019. He is a member of the Bharatiya Janata Party and the Rashtriya Swayamsevak Sangh. Mukhi served as the 13th Lieutenant Governor of Andaman and Nicobar Islands from 2016 to 2017, Minister of Finance, Planning, Excise and Taxation and Higher Education, Government of Delhi in the Swaraj ministry from 1998 to 1998 representing Janakpuri Assembly constituency in the Delhi Legislative Assembly from 1993 to 2015.

== Early years and family life ==
Professor Jagdish Mukhi was born on 1 December 1942 in Dajal (in present-day Pakistan) to a Saraiki Khatri Hindu family. At age 4, during the Partition of India, the family moved to Sohna.

Mukhi gained a B.Com. from Raj Rishi College in Alwar, Rajasthan in 1965, followed by a M.Com. from the University of Delhi in 1967o. Until entering politics he was a professor at Shaheed Bhagat Singh College, Delhi University. He was awarded a PhD in finance from Kurukshetra University in October 1995.

He married Prem Grover in 1970, who as Prem Mukhi is actively involved in social development works for women empowerment under the banner of Mahila Jagriti Sangh. He has a son Atul (BE, MBA) and a daughter Latika.

== Political career ==
Mukhi attended an RSS training camp while at school in Panipat in 1958, became the secretary (Karyawaha) of Alwar District RSS in 1964, and campaigned against the Emergency with the Delhi RSS in 1975. Having moved to Janakpuri, Delhi in 1973, he became the General Secretary of the Janakpuri branch of the nascent Janata Party in September 1977.

His first election success was in a 1980 by-election for the advisory Delhi Metropolitan Council.

He held the role of Minister of Higher Education, when he launched Guru Gobind Singh Indraprastha University in the record time of 8 months.

He was awarded as best planning minister of the nation by the then Union planning minister Pranab Mukherjee. Two times he was awarded best MLA award in Delhi Vidhan Sabha. He represented Janak Puri constituency continuously from 1980 and has won seven continuous Vidhan Sabha elections from the same constituency, until losing the 2015 election by 25000 votes to AAP leader Mr. Rajesh Rishi. He has worked at all levels in the BJP & given the best performance as president, BJP Mandal Janak Puri; General Secretary, BJP West District; President, BJP West District; General Secretary, BJP Delhi; Prabhari, BJP affairs Jammu & Kashmir; Prabhari BJP affairs Haryana.

He became Lieutenant Governor of Andaman and Nicobar Islands in August 2016, then Governor of Assam in September 2017.

Government offices
Preceded by A. K. Singh	Lieutenant Governor of Andaman and Nicobar; 22 August 2016 – 7 October 2017	Succeeded by Admiral (Retd.) D K Joshi
Preceded by Banwarilal Purohit	Governor of Assam; 10 October 2017 – 20 February 2023	Succeeded by Ghulab Chand Kataria
Preceded by Kummanam Rajasekharan	Governor of Mizoram; 8 March 2019 – 5 November 2019; Additional Charge	Succeeded by P. S. Sreedharan Pillai
