= Ashish Sood =

Indian politician (born 1966)

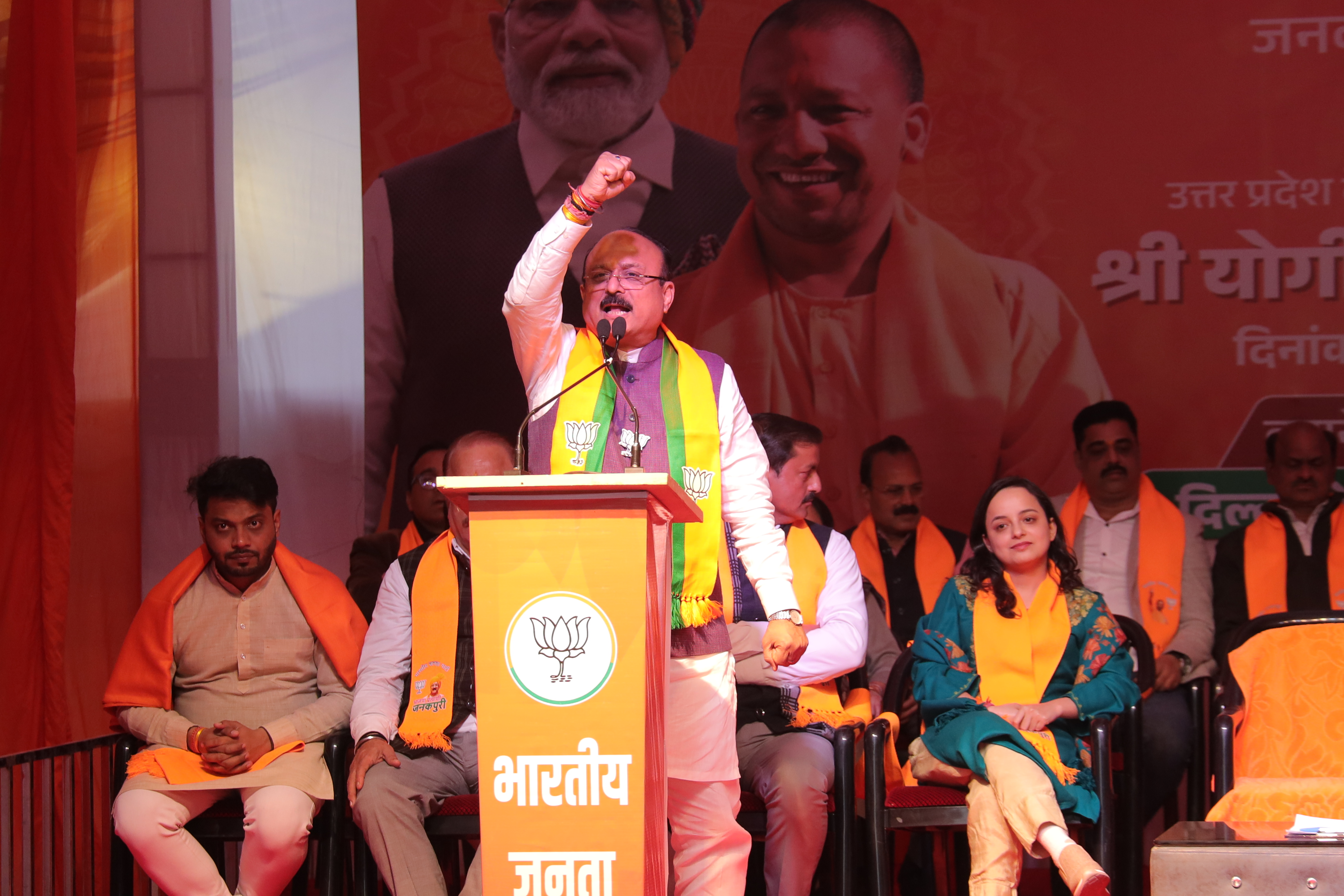

Cabinet Minister, Government of Delhi
- Incumbent
- Assumed office 20 February 2025
- Lieutenant Governor: Vinai Kumar Saxena
- Chief Minister: Rekha Gupta
- Ministry and Departments: List: Home; Power; Education; Higher Education; Training & Technical Education
- Preceded by: Kailash Gahlot

Member of Delhi Legislative Assembly
- Incumbent
- Assumed office 8 February 2025
- Preceded by: Rajesh Rishi
- Constituency: Janakpuri

Personal details
- Born: 2 September 1966 (age 60) Delhi, India
- Party: Bharatiya Janata Party
- Education: (BCom) Atma Ram Sanatan Dharma College; Delhi University

Ashish Sood (born 2 September 1966) is an Indian politician from Bharatiya Janata Party from Delhi. He is currently serving as the home, power and education minister of Delhi. He was elected as a Member of the Legislative Assembly in the 8th Delhi Assembly from Janakpuri Assembly constituency. He is also serving as Prabhari Goa and Seh Prabhari Jammu & Kashmir BJP.

== Early life and education ==
Ashish Sood's political journey began during his college days at Atma Ram Sanatan Dharma College of the University of Delhi from where he pursued a BCom degree. He actively took part in student politics in college. Sood was associated with ABVP, the nationalist student organisation in India. He was first elected Secretary of the college, after which he rose to the post of Joint Secretary of DUSU and later became the President of DUSU in 1988–89. He then went on to work as a full-time worker of ABVP from 1989 to 1993. As a student leader, he spearheaded several movements against corruption in the high offices of the then Central Government, including the most infamous ‘Bofors Scam’ of the 80s.

== Political career ==
In 2002, he joined the Bharatiya Janata Yuva Morcha (BJYM), first as the Vice President of its Delhi unit and then went on to become its General Secretary in 2003, and finally, the National Vice President, in 2005. In 2008, he was inducted as Secretary of BJP Delhi, and in 2009, he became the General Secretary of BJP Delhi. In 2012, he was elected as a councillor of South MCD. In 2013, he was appointed the Vice President of BJP Delhi, and in 2014, as its General Secretary. In 2016, he was chosen as the Leader of House, South Delhi Municipal Corporation. He was made the In-charge of Publicity Department, Delhi BJP (appointed by the then-Delhi BJP President Manoj Tiwari) and also the BJP In-charge of Chandni Chowk District in 2018.

Sood became the BJP's MLA Candidate for Janakpuri constituency in 2020. The same year he was appointed the Co-Incharge of BJP, Jammu and Kashmir State Unit.

In 2025, Sood was elected as the MLA for Janakpuri constituency, regaining the seat from the Aam Aadmi Party.

== Public works and service ==
He also acted as the Chairperson of the Remunerative Project (RP) Cell of SDMC twice, where he has also served as the Leader of the House and a member of the Standing Committee. As the Chairperson of RP Cell, he reformed advertising and parking policy of the corporation, under which only registered vendors were allowed to participate in the tender process. He also worked towards improving street lighting in Janakpuri.

In his tenure, Janakpuri received basic amenities – roads & primary schools were constructed, and infrastructure like boundary walls and berms were renovated. He is also known for his work for senior citizens, sending them on Teertha Yatras and starting free diabetes check-up facilities at recreational centres. He was also appointed the Chairperson of the Education Committee in 2014, and launched several beneficiary projects like NEEV or the Lenovo Tablet Yojana.
