= Janakpuri Assembly constituency =

Constituency of the Delhi legislative assembly in India

Coordinates: 28.62°N 77.09°E

Janakpuri
- Constituency No. 30 for the Delhi Legislative Assembly

Constituency details
- Country: India
- Region: North India
- State: Delhi
- District: West Delhi
- Established: 1993
- Reservation: None

Member of Legislative Assembly
- 8th Delhi Legislative Assembly
- Incumbent Ashish Sood
- Party: Bhartiya Janata Party
- Elected year: 2025

Janakpuri Assembly constituency is one of the 70 Delhi Legislative Assembly constituencies of the National Capital Territory in northern India.

== Overview ==
Present geographical structure of Janakpuri constituency came into existence in 2008 as a part of the implementation of the recommendations of the Delimitation Commission of India constituted in 2002. Janakpuri is part of West Delhi Lok Sabha constituency along with nine other Assembly segments, namely, Madipur, Rajouri Garden, Hari Nagar, Tilak Nagar, Uttam Nagar, Vikaspuri, Dwarka, Matiala and Najafgarh.

== Members of the Legislative Assembly ==
Year	Member	Party
1993	Jagdish Mukhi	Bharatiya Janata Party
1998	Jagdish Mukhi	Bharatiya Janata Party
2003	Jagdish Mukhi	Bharatiya Janata Party
2008	Jagdish Mukhi	Bharatiya Janata Party
2013	Jagdish Mukhi	Bharatiya Janata Party
2015	Rajesh Rishi	Aam Aadmi Party
2020	Rajesh Rishi	Aam Aadmi Party
2025	Ashish Sood	Bharatiya Janata Party

== Election results ==
Vote share of winning candidates
2025	55.30%
2020	54.43%
2015	57.72%
2013	39.87%
2008	57.15%
2003	59.69%
1998	55.86%
1993	62.54%

=== 2025 ===
Delhi Assembly elections, 2025: Janakpuri
Party	Candidate	Votes	%	±%
BJP	Ashish Sood	68,986	55.3	▲12.82
AAP	Pravin Kumar	50,220	40.2	▼14.23
INC	Harbani Kaur	3,345	2.7	▲1.03
NOTA	None of the above	691	0.3	▼0.25
Majority		18,776	15.1	▲3.15
Turnout		1,24,128	63.0	▼2.85
BJP gain from AAP		Swing	Bharatiya Janata Party	

=== 2020 ===
Delhi Assembly elections, 2020: Janakpuri
Party	Candidate	Votes	%	±%
AAP	Rajesh Rishi	67,968	54.43	−3.29
BJP	Ashish Sood	53,051	42.48	+5.33
INC	Radhika Khera	2,084	1.67	−2.10
BSP	Raj Kumar	505	0.40	+0.03
NOTA	None of the above	691	0.55	+0.17
Majority		14,917	11.95	−8.62
Turnout		1,24,989	65.85	+0.39
AAP hold		Swing	-3.29	

=== 2015 ===
Delhi Assembly elections, 2015: Janakpuri
Party	Candidate	Votes	%	±%
AAP	Rajesh Rishi	71,802	57.72	+20.30
BJP	Prof. Jagdish Mukhi	46,222	37.15	−2.72
INC	Suresh Kumar	4,699	3.77	−12.21
BSP	Hari Prakash Singh	471	0.37	−0.58
SS	Paramjit Singh Saini	49	0.03	N/A
NOTA	None of the above	483	0.38	−0.39
Majority		25,580	20.57	+14.11
Turnout		1,24,398	71.44	
AAP gain from BJP		Swing	+21.66	

=== 2013 ===
Delhi Assembly elections, 2013: Janakpuri
Party	Candidate	Votes	%	±%
BJP	Jagdish Mukhi	42,886	39.87	−17.28
AAP	Rajesh Rishi	40,242	37.42	
INC	Ragini Nayak	17,191	15.98	−21.48
Independent	Sanjay Puri	4,332	4.03	
BSP	Hari Prakash Singh	1,019	0.95	−2.27
JD(U)	Pankaj Singh	379	0.35	
Proutist Bloc	Virender Jha	304	0.28	
Independent	Sukh Lal	142	0.13	
DMDK	K Swarna	110	0.10	
Independent	Alok Sharma	71	0.07	
Independent	Deepak Arora	71	0.07	−0.09
NOTA	None	805	0.75	
Majority		2,644	2.46	−17.23
Turnout		1,07,638	69.05	
BJP hold		Swing	-17.28	

=== 2008 ===
Delhi Assembly elections, 2008: Janakpuri
Party	Candidate	Votes	%	±%
BJP	Jagdish Mukhi	50,655	57.15	−2.54
INC	Deepak Arora	33,203	37.46	−0.42
BSP	Prem Chand Baswal	2,857	3.22	
Independent	Shiv Kumar	522	0.59	
Independent	Bharat Prasad	454	0.51	
SP	Aamir Anjum	441	0.50	
Independent	Baljit Singh	163	0.18	
Independent	Deepak Arora	141	0.16	+0.10
ABHM	Harish Chandra Joshi	106	0.12	
LJP	Sirajuddin Khan	99	0.11	+0.05
Majority		17,452	19.69	−2.12
Turnout		88,641	61.2	+3.25
BJP hold		Swing	-2.54	

=== 2003 ===
Delhi Assembly elections, 2003: Janakpuri
Party	Candidate	Votes	%	±%
BJP	Jagdish Mukhi	35,281	59.69	+3.83
INC	Shiv Kumar Sondhi	22,390	37.88	−4.16
SS	Anil Jain	433	0.73	+0.46
NCP	Dinesh Jain	411	0.70	
Independent	Satbir	148	0.25	
IJP	Prem Ji	115	0.19	
Independent	Vinod Vohra	89	0.15	
Akhil Bharatiya Jan Sangh	Laxmi Narain Bhatia	66	0.11	
Independent	Mukesh Jain	57	0.10	+0.01
JD(U)	Urmila Dhall	42	0.07	
Independent	Deepak Arora	37	0.06	
LJP	Gulam Moho	36	0.06	
Majority		12,891	21.81	+7.99
Turnout		59,105	57.95	+4.94
BJP hold		Swing	+3.83	

=== 1998 ===
Delhi Assembly elections, 1998: Janakpuri
Party	Candidate	Votes	%	±%
BJP	Jagdish Mukhi	31,115	55.86	−6.68
INC	Shiv Kumar Sondhi	23,415	42.04	+9.11
Lok Shakti	Rajibir Singh	750	1.35	
Independent	Rajender Kapoor	224	0.40	
SS	Naresh Malik	148	0.27	+0.05
Independent	Mukesh Jain	49	0.09	
Majority		7,700	13.82	−15.79
Turnout		55,701	53.01	−3.22
BJP hold		Swing	-6.68	

=== 1993 ===
Delhi Assembly elections, 1993: Janakpuri
Party	Candidate	Votes	%	±%
BJP	Jagdish Mukhi	33,905	62.54	
INC	Shailender s/o M P Sahi	17,852	32.93	
JD	Kunwar Chatter Singh	755	1.39	
BSP	Hans Raj	420	0.77	
DND	Moji Ram	197	0.36	
Independent	Davesh Tiwari	140	0.26	
Independent	Sunder	128	0.24	
SS	Bal Raj Verma	117	0.22	
Independent	O N Chopra	112	0.21	
Independent	Major Sahib Ram	90	0.17	
Independent	Ladha Ram Kapoor	76	0.14	
Independent	D L Bhatia	64	0.12	
Independent	Rajiv Kumar	61	0.11	
Independent	Kamleshwari Saran	55	0.10	
Independent	Bal Chand	46	0.08	
Independent	Shailender s/o Shyam Prakash	37	0.07	
Independent	Rajesh	32	0.06	
Independent	Manohar Singh	31	0.06	
Independent	Nutan Tiwari	30	0.06	
Independent	O P Ranjan	23	0.04	
Independent	Narender Kumar	22	0.04	
Independent	Laxman Dass	12	0.02	
Independent	Ajit Singh	11	0.02	
Majority		16,053	31.61	
Turnout		54,216	56.23	
BJP hold		Swing		

== See also ==
- Janakpuri
