= Bismil (TV series) =

Pakistani television series

- Genre: Drama
- Written by: Zanjabeel Asim Shah
- Directed by: Aehsun Talish
- Starring: Naumaan Ijaz; Hareem Farooq; Savera Nadeem; Saad Qureshi; Behroze Sabzwari; Shaheen Khan; Asad Siddiqui; Rabia Shakeel; Adnan Jeelani
- Country of origin: Pakistan
- Original language: Urdu
- No. of episodes: 38

Production
- Producer: Abdullah Seja
- Production company: iDream Entertainment

Original release
- Network: ARY Digital
- Release: August 21 – December 26, 2024

Bismil is a Pakistani television drama series that aired on ARY Digital from 21 August to 26 December 2024. The series was written by Zanjabeel Asim Shah, directed by Aehsun Talish and produced by Abdullah Seja under the banner of iDream Entertainment. It stars Naumaan Ijaz, Hareem Farooq, Savera Nadeem and Saad Qureshi, alongside Behroze Sabzwari, Shaheen Khan, Asad Siddiqui and other actors.

The story follows Masooma, a young woman from a middle-class family who aspires to attain a wealthy lifestyle. After becoming involved with Tauqeer Taseer, a successful businessman and the husband of Reham, she pursues a relationship with him that brings conflict into his family. The drama explores ambition, financial status, infidelity, marriage and the consequences of personal choices.

== Cast ==
- Naumaan Ijaz as Tauqeer Taseer (T.T.)
- Hareem Farooq as Masooma
- Savera Nadeem as Reham
- Saad Qureshi as Moosa
- Behroze Sabzwari
- Shaheen Khan
- Asad Siddiqui
- Rabia Shakeel
- Adnan Jeelani

== Production ==
Bismil marked Hareem Farooq's return to television acting after a period in which she had primarily focused on film production. The drama brought her together with Naumaan Ijaz and Savera Nadeem in a story centred on relationships, wealth and family conflict.

The series was directed by Aehsun Talish and written by Zanjabeel Asim Shah. Abdullah Seja produced it under iDream Entertainment, and it was broadcast on ARY Digital.

== Reception ==
Bismil received coverage in Pakistani newspapers during its broadcast, particularly for its portrayal of an extramarital relationship and the resulting tensions within a family.

In September 2024, Dawn discussed the drama in its television column, describing its central conflict involving Masooma, Tauqeer and his family. The newspaper also commented on the performances of the lead actors and the series' treatment of wealth and social status.

A subsequent Dawn review examined the developing conflict between Tauqeer and his family, including the effects of his relationship with Masooma on his wife and son.

In September 2024, The Express Tribune published an interview-based report about Hareem Farooq's preparation for the role of Masooma. Farooq discussed her understanding of the character and the decisions involved in portraying her in the series.

In November 2024, Daily Jang reported on Farooq's comments about the public reaction to Masooma. The actor discussed the criticism directed at the character and the social labels associated with women who pursue relationships for financial security or status.
