= INS Ranjit (D53) =

1979 Rajput-class destroyer

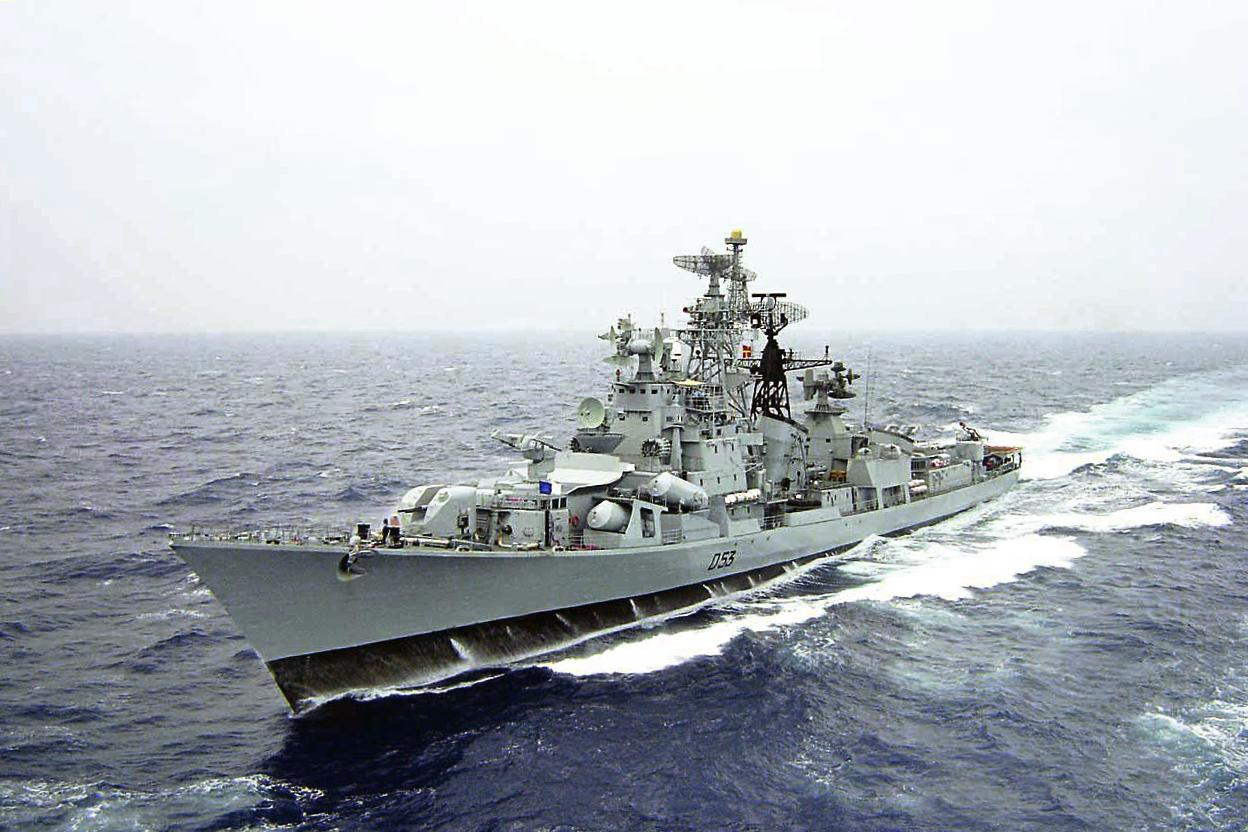
- INS Ranjit

History

India
- Name: Ranjit
- Namesake: Ranjit Singh
- Builder: 61 Kommunara Shipbuilding Plant
- Launched: 16 June 1979
- Commissioned: 24 November 1983
- Decommissioned: 6 May 2019
- Identification: Pennant number: D53; MMSI number: 419100180
- Fate: Sunk during TROPEX-21

General characteristics
- Class & type: Rajput-class destroyer
- Displacement: 3,950 tons standard, 4,974 tons full load
- Length: 147 m (482 ft)
- Beam: 15.8 m (52 ft)
- Draught: 5 m (16 ft)
- Propulsion: 4 x gas turbine engines; 2 shafts, 72,000 hp (54,000 kW)
- Speed: 35 knots (65 km/h)
- Range: 4,000 mi (6,400 km) at 18 knots (33 km/h); 2,600 miles (4,200 km) at 30 knots (56 km/h)
- Complement: 320 (including 35 officers)
- Sensors & processing systems: Navigation: 2 x Volga (NATO: Don Kay) radar at I-band frequency, Air: 1 x MP-500 Kliver (NATO: Big Net-A) radar at C-band or 1 x Bharat RAWL (Dutch Signaal LW08) radar at D-band (installed on INS Ranjit), Air/Surface: 1 x MR-310U Angara (NATO: Head Net-C) radar at E-band, replaced by 1 x EL/M-2238 STAR; Communication: Inmarsat, Sonar: 1 x hull mounted Vycheda MG-311 (NATO: Wolf Paw) sonar replaced with BEL HUMSA during MLR, 1 x Vyega MG-325 (NATO: Mare Tail) variable depth sonar
- Armament: Anti-surface: 4 × SS-N-2D Styx AShM missiles; Air-defence: 2 × S-125M (NATO: SA-N-1) SAM launchers; Guns: 2 × 76.2 mm (3 in) main gun, 4 × 30 mm (1.2 in) AK-630M CIWS; Anti-submarine: 1 × 533 mm (21 in) PTA 533 quintuple torpedo tube launcher, 2 × RBU-6000 anti-submarine mortars,
- Aircraft carried: 1 x HAL Chetak helicopter

INS Ranjit (lit. 'Victorious in Battle') was the third of the five Rajput-class destroyer built for the Indian Navy. Ranjit was commissioned on 15 September 1983 and remained in service till 6 May 2019, when it was decommissioned.

== Construction and service ==
Ranjit was laid down by Indian request under the Soviet name Lovkiy at the 61 Kommunara Shipbuilding Plant in Nikolayev, Ukraine on 29 June 1977 with the serial number 2203. She had previously been planned to be named Porazhayushchy on 16 May of that year, and was built as a Project 61MZ large anti-submarine ship (NATO reporting name Kashin-class destroyer). The destroyer was launched on 16 June 1979 and added to the list of ships of the Soviet Navy on 30 October 1981.

She was commissioned on 15 September 1983 in the erstwhile USSR with then Captain Vishnu Bhagwat in command. She completed post commissioning trials and set sail from Poti in USSR on 14 November 1983 and entered Mumbai on 22 Dec 1983. She visited ports in Bulgaria, Yugoslavia and Egypt during her maiden voyage to India. She joined the Western Fleet and operated under the Flag of FOCWF till April 1999. In May 1999, she changed her home port to Vishakhapatnam to become a part of the Eastern Fleet.

INS Ranjit was decommissioned at the naval dockyard in Visakhapatnam on 6 May 2019 after serving for 36 years. Her last commanding officer was Captain Vikram C Mehra.

During TROPEX-21 exercise of the Indian Navy, the decommissioned Ranjit was sunk by a torpedo.

== Bibliography ==
- Berezhnoy, S.S. (January 1995). "Советский ВМФ 1945-1995: крейсера, большие противолодочные корабли, эсминцы" [Soviet Navy, 1945–1995: Cruisers, large anti-submarine ships, and destroyers]. Морская коллекция [Morskaya kollektsiya] (in Russian) (1). OCLC 831205953.
