= Bismil (singer) =

Indian singer

- Also known as: Bismil; Bismil Ki Mehfil
- Born: Mohd Asif; May 19, 1994 (age 32)
- Genres: Pop, Sufi music, Classical music
- Occupations: Singer, songwriter

Mohd Asif (born 19 May 1994), professionally known as Bismil, is an Indian singer and songwriter. He is known for his Classical Sufi music. He started gaining recognition for his releases titled Ki Kita and cover versions of Kehna Galat Galat, Kali Kali Zulfon Ke Phande and Tumhe Dilagi, Halka Halka Suroor.

== Early life ==
Bismil started learning music at the age of 5. He learnt music from Moradabad Gharana, Delhi Gharana and was taught music by Ustaad Mohd. Ahmed Qadri, Ustad Iqbal Ahmed Khan, Ustad Aftab Ahmed Khan and more as his gurus.

== Career ==
Bismil started learning music at the age of 5. He started professionally singing and performing at the age of 18. Initially, he was performing in small gigs and weddings. He met his manager Vibhor Hasija, founder of Yours Eventfully, in his college, who first started producing music for him and later worked together with to build the foundation of "Bismil Ki Mehfil" in 2013 and expand Sufism music. Bismil released his first song called "Tere Bina" with Zee Music in 2019.

In 2020, he released Ki Kita, starring the Indian model Akansha Sareen, and Nawab Faizii.

In 2022, he released a cover of the song "Kali Kali Zulfon Ke Phande", originally by Nusrat Fateh Ali Khan. The song gained significant popularity online.

In 2023, he was featured on Times Square Billboard during his 10 cities US & Canada tour. He was the first Sufi artist from India to perform in US & Canadian cities.

The same year, he won GIWA Awards for Best Wedding Entertainer and WeddingSutra Influencer Awards for Best Live Entertainers for Weddings.

Bismil was invited to perform at Etihad Arena in Abu Dhabi, following the only singer from India to perform in the Arena after Aijit Singh and A R Rahman.
