= List of shipwrecks in 2007 =

The list of shipwrecks in 2007 includes ships sunk, foundered, grounded, or otherwise lost during 2007.

table of contents
2007
Jan	Feb	Mar	Apr
May	Jun	Jul	Aug
Sep	Oct	Nov	Dec

== January ==
=== 7 January ===
List of shipwrecks: 7 January 2007
Ship	State	Description
Hunter	United States	After suffering heavy icing, the 58-foot (17.7 m) fishing vessel capsized and sank in 10 minutes in the Shelikof Strait 2 nautical miles (3.7 km; 2.3 mi) east of Cape Igvak (57°26′N 156°01′W) on the south coast of the Alaska Peninsula in Alaska. Wearing survival suits, her crew of four abandoned ship in a life raft and was rescued by a United States Coast Guard Sikorsky HH-60 Jayhawk helicopter.

=== 10 January ===
List of shipwrecks: 10 January 2007
Ship	State	Description
Pere Charles	Ireland	The 20 m (66 ft) fishing trawler sank in a storm southeast of Ireland with all five crew presumed dead. Two lifeboats were found empty the next day.
Sunna	Norway	Ran aground west of Swona, suffering severe damage.

=== 12 January ===
List of shipwrecks: 12 January 2007
Ship	State	Description
Server	Cyprus	Server at Ågotnes The bulk carrier suffered an engine break-down, and was driven aground by a storm on the coast of the island of Fedje, Norway. The ship broke in two, with the bow section being salvaged and towed to Ågotnes, while the stern broke apart. The salvaged bow section was scrapped in Esbjerg, Denmark, starting in April 2008.

=== 20 January ===
List of shipwrecks: 20 January 2007
Ship	State	Description
MSC Napoli	United Kingdom	The container ship was deliberately beached on Branscombe beach, Lyme Bay to prevent sinking, after suffering a serious structural failure to her hull during a severe storm the previous day south east of The Lizard. Refloated on 9 July.

=== 26 January ===
List of shipwrecks: 26 January 2007
Ship	State	Description
Lady of Grace	United States	The 75-foot (23 m) fishing boat sank in Nantucket Sound with the loss of all four crew. The weather at the time was of winds of 25 to 30 knots (46 to 56 km/h) and 8-to-10-foot (2.4 to 3.0 m) seas.

=== 28 January ===
List of shipwrecks: 28 January 2007
Ship	State	Description
Tenacious	United States	The 40-foot (12 m) yacht presumed lost off San Francisco, California in good weather. Computer scientist Jim Gray was making a solo day trip. The Coast Guard suspended the search for the ship on 1 February.

=== 30 January ===
List of shipwrecks: 30 January 2007
Ship	State	Description
Nordkapp	Norway	The cruise ship ran aground near Deception Island, Antarctic Ocean. Passengers transferred to her sister ship Nordnorge (Norway) and HMS Endurance (Royal Navy) took non-essential crew aboard.

== February ==
=== 1 February ===
List of shipwrecks: 1 February 2007
Ship	State	Description
Lucky Lady	United States	The 52-foot (16 m) fishing boat was lost off Cape Elizabeth, Maine with the two crew missing. Weather conditions were only 4-foot (1.2 m) waves and 10-knot (19 km/h; 12 mph) winds.

=== 3 February ===
List of shipwrecks: 3 February 2007
Ship	State	Description
Sea Express 1	United Kingdom	She collided with Alaska Rainbow (Greece) in the River Mersey and was severely damaged. She was later repaired and returned to service.

=== 10 February ===
List of shipwrecks: 10 February 2007
Ship	State	Description
Illusion	United States	The 42-foot (12.8 m) fishing vessel sank in Makushin Bay (53°44′N 167°00′W) on the coast of Unalaska Island in the Aleutian Islands. A United States Coast Guard helicopter rescued her crew of four from a life raft.

=== 20 February ===
List of shipwrecks: 20 February 2007
Ship	State	Description
Jade Alaska	United States	The 122-foot (37.2 m) cod fish tender rolled over and sank at the south end of the Shelikof Strait near Kodiak Island in Alaska′s Kodiak Archipelago after her engine room flooded. A United States Coast Guard helicopter rescued her crew of three from a life raft.

=== 25 February ===
List of shipwrecks: 25 February 2007
Ship	State	Description
Levina 1	Indonesia	The passenger ferry sank in the Java Sea after burning for three days, with over fifty people killed.

=== 28 February ===
List of shipwrecks: 28 February 2007
Ship	State	Description
Kyoi	Liberation Tigers of Tamil Eelam	Sri Lankan Civil War: The Liberation Tigers of Tamil Eelam supply ship was sunk 730 nautical miles (1,350 km) south of Sri Lanka by the Sri Lanka Navy.

== March ==
=== 7 March ===
List of shipwrecks: 7 March 2007
Ship	State	Description
Star Trek	United States	The 35-foot (10.7 m) cod–fishing vessel was wrecked in Island Bay (57°33′20″N 155°50′00″W) off of Jute Bay (57°32′32″N 155°51′00″W) on the southern coast of the Alaska Peninsula. A United States Coast Guard helicopter rescued her entire crew from the beach.

=== 8 March ===
List of shipwrecks: 8 March 2007
Ship	State	Description
Repubblica di Genova	Italy	The freighter capsized in the port of Antwerp, Belgium with no loss of life. She was recovered by parbuckling in September 2007.

=== 13 March ===
List of shipwrecks: 13 March 2007
Ship	State	Description
Risky Business	United States	Risky Business sinking. The 53-foot (16.2 m) halibut–fishing vessel sank in 20-foot (6.1 m) seas and 50-knot (93 km/h; 58 mph) winds in the Gulf of Alaska approximately 69 nautical miles (128 km; 79 mi) east of Kodiak, Alaska. Her five-man crew abandoned ship in survival suits and was rescued by a United States Coast Guard helicopter.

=== 18 March ===
List of shipwrecks: 18 March 2007
Ship	State	Description
Seiyoo	Sri Lanka Liberation Tigers of Tamil Eelam	Sri Lankan Civil War: The Liberation Tigers of Tamil Eelam supply ship was sunk 825 nautical miles (1,528 km) south of Sri Lanka by the Sri Lanka Navy.

== April ==
=== 6 April ===
List of shipwrecks: 6 April 2007
Ship	State	Description
Sea Diamond	Greece	Sea Diamond. The cruise ship sank near Santorini, Greece, after running aground the preceding day.

=== 10 April ===
List of shipwrecks: 10 April 2007
Ship	State	Description
Long Bay	United States	The retired 77-foot (23.5 m) fishing trawler was scuttled as an artificial reef in the North Atlantic Ocean off Townsends Inlet, New Jersey, in 60 feet (18 m) of water at 39°06.476′N 074°36.471′W.

=== 12 April ===
List of shipwrecks: 12 April 2007
Ship	State	Description
Bourbon Dolphin	Norway	The anchor handling tug supply vessel sank of the coast off the Shetland Islands and claiming eight lives.

=== 18 April ===
List of shipwrecks: 18 April 2007
Ship	State	Description
Juliett 484	United States	The ex-Russian submarine, serving as a living museum docked in the harbor at Providence, Rhode Island, sank during a storm.

=== 24 April ===
List of shipwrecks: 24 April 2007
Ship	State	Description
Caterina D	United States	The retired 70-foot (21.3 m) fishing trawler was scuttled as an artificial reef in the North Atlantic Ocean 2 nautical miles (3.7 km; 2.3 mi) off Mantoloking, New Jersey, in 80 feet (24 m) of water at 40°01.650′N 073°59.747′W.

=== 25 April ===
List of shipwrecks: 25 April 2007
Ship	State	Description
Halibut Endeavor	United States	The 36-foot (11.0 m) passenger vessel capsized and sank 5 nautical miles (9.3 km; 5.8 mi) from Seldovia, Alaska. A 27-foot (8.2 m) United States Coast Guard Auxiliary vessel rescued her 11 passengers and crew of two.

=== 26 April ===
List of shipwrecks: 26 April 2007
Ship	State	Description
Sea Bear	United States	Sea Bear The fishing vessel was stranded near Klag Bay (57°38′N 136°06′W) on Chichagof Island in the Alexander Archipelago in Southeast Alaska. The three-man crew abandoned ship in a skiff, and a United States Coast Guard helicopter rescued all three from the shore.

== May ==
=== 14 May ===
List of shipwrecks: 14 May 2007
Ship	State	Description
HMCS Huron	Canadian Forces Maritime Command	The decommissioned Iroquois-class destroyer was sunk as a missile and gunnery target in the Pacific Ocean off Vancouver Island, British Columbia, Canada.

=== 17 May ===
List of shipwrecks: 17 May 2007
Ship	State	Description
Unidentified supply ship	Sri Lanka Liberation Tigers of Tamil Eelam	Sri Lankan Civil War: The armed supply ship was shelled and sunk by Maldives Coast Guard ship Huravee (Maldives) in the Indian Ocean.

=== 25 May ===
List of shipwrecks: 25 May 2007
Ship	State	Description
Sulzer	United States	The retired 100-foot (30.5 m) barge was scuttled as an artificial reef in the North Atlantic Ocean 4.5 nautical miles (8.3 km; 5.2 mi) off Ocean City, New Jersey, at 39°10.032′N 074°34.008′W.

=== Unknown date ===
List of shipwrecks: Unknown date May 2007
Ship	State	Description
USS Sailfish	United States Navy	The decommissioned Sailfish-class submarine was sunk as a target at 47°05′47″N 127°23′08″W off the coast of Washington by a Mark 48 ADCAP torpedo fired by the submarine USS Topeka (United States Navy).

== June ==
=== 8 June ===
List of shipwrecks: 8 June 2007
Ship	State	Description
Pasha Bulker	Panama	Pasha Bulker. The bulk carrier was driven ashore at Newcastle, New South Wales, Australia. She was refloated on 2 July. Subsequently repaired and returned to service.

=== 23 June ===
List of shipwrecks: 23 June 2007
Ship	State	Description
Magnum	United States	The 56-foot (17.1 m) salmon seiner sank near Cape Igvak (57°26′N 156°01′W) on the coast of the Alaska Peninsula in Alaska. Her four crew members – all members of the same family – abandoned ship in a life raft and were rescued in the Shelikof Strait 17 nautical miles (31 km; 20 mi) west of Halibut Bay (57.3914°N 154.7169°W) on Kodiak Island by the vessel Sea Storm (United States) on 26 June.

=== 25 June ===
List of shipwrecks: 25 June 2007
Ship	State	Description
IX-523	United States Navy	The decommissioned 174-foot (53 m) miscellaneous auxiliary, a former gasoline barge, was scuttled as an artificial reef in the North Atlantic Ocean off the coast of Delaware at 38°40′N 074°43′W.

=== 28 June ===
List of shipwrecks: 28 June 2007
Ship	State	Description
Margaret	United States	The retired 97-foot (29.6 m) tug was scuttled as an artificial reef in the North Atlantic Ocean off the coast of Delaware at 38°40.540′N 074°43.957′W.

== July ==
=== 2 July ===
List of shipwrecks: 2 July 2007
Ship	State	Description
Claudia C	United States	The 18-gross ton, 32.8-foot (10.0 m) fishing vessel sank in Cook Inlet on the south-central coast of Alaska 6 nautical miles (11 km; 6.9 mi) off Ninilchik. Her crew of three was rescued by the fishing vessel Holly Ann (United States).

=== 12 July ===
List of shipwrecks: 12 July 2007
Ship	State	Description
MSC Napoli	United Kingdom	The container ship was deliberately beached on Branscombe beach, Lyme Bay, after suffering a serious structural failure to her hull during a severe storm the previous day south east of The Lizard on 20 January 2007. She was refloated on 9 July, but was re-beached on 12 July. She was blown in two with explosives on 20 July. Her forward section was towed off and scrapped.

=== 14 July ===
List of shipwrecks: 14 July 2007
Ship	State	Description
Cape Saint Elias (or Cape St. Elias)	United States	The fishing vessel capsized and was lost in Eastern Channel off Sitka, Alaska. Her crew of five was rescued by two other vessels. She may have been salvaged and returned to service in 2009.

== August ==
=== 3 August ===
List of shipwrecks: 3 August 2007
Ship	State	Description
Olshana	Russia	The trawler sank in Tangafjørður between the two Faroese islands of Streymoy and Eysturoy after hitting a skerry, Flesjarnar the evening before. There were no casualties.

=== 3 August ===
List of shipwrecks: 3 August 2007
Ship	State	Description
Amunafa	Sierra Leone	The ferry operating on the Freetown–Kasire route capsized off the coast of Bailor, Sierra Leone, 158 killed.

=== 5 August ===
List of shipwrecks: 5 August 2007
Ship	State	Description
Jork	Antigua and Barbuda	The vessel sank after colliding with the unmanned North Sea gas platform Viking Echo (64 kilometres (35 nmi) off the Norfolk coast), the entire crew was rescued, the gas platform survived and continues to operate. The vessel had been destined for one of the Humber ports carrying a cargo of grain from Lübeck in Germany.

=== 7 August ===
List of shipwrecks: 7 August 2007
Ship	State	Description
USS Knox	United States Navy	The decommissioned Knox-class frigate was sunk as a target in the Pacific Ocean off Guam.

=== 12 August ===
List of shipwrecks: 12 August 2007
Ship	State	Description
New Flame	Panama	New Flame The bulk carrier collided with an oil tanker off Europa Point, the southernmost tip of Gibraltar, ending partially submerged.

=== 13 August ===
List of shipwrecks: 13 August 2007
Ship	State	Description
Miss Doxsee	United States	The retired 80-foot (24.4 m) fishing trawler was scuttled as an artificial reef in the North Atlantic Ocean off Townsends Inlet, New Jersey, in 60 feet (18.3 m) of water at 39°06.605′N 074°36.177′W.

=== 14 August ===
List of shipwrecks: 14 August 2007
Ship	State	Description
P29	Maritime Squadron of the Armed Forces of Malta	The wreck of P29 on 24 October 2014. The patrol boat was scuttled off Ċirkewwa, Malta, as an artificial reef.

=== 17 August ===
List of shipwrecks: 17 August 2007
Ship	State	Description
Aldebaran	United States	After a crew member fell asleep at her helm, the 54-gross ton, 54.5-foot (16.6 m) fishing vessel grounded on Bold Island (58°04′N 157°29′W) in Southeast Alaska, then flooded and sank in 474 feet (144 m) of water 10 nautical miles (19 km; 12 mi) south of Ketchikan, Alaska. The fishing vessel Champion (United States) rescued her all five members of her crew.

=== 20 August ===
List of shipwrecks: 20 August 2007
Ship	State	Description
Golden Girls	United States	While her crew was attempting to haul a large number of fish aboard, the 20-gross ton, 42.5-foot (13.0 m) salmon seiner capsized and sank in Ugak Bay (57°25′N 152°35′W) on the coast of Kodiak Island in Alaska′s Kodiak Archipelago. The fishing vessel Chiniak (United States) rescued her crew of four from a skiff. The owner of Golden Girls later cut up and removed her wreck.

=== 23 August ===
List of shipwrecks: 23 August 2007
Ship	State	Description
Douala Tide		Sank off Port Alfred in South Africa. The South African maritime authorities rescued ten seafarers after the vessel capsized. The vessel had been sailing from Dubai to Douala, and was a 37-foot (11 m) anchor-handling tug. One died

=== 30 August ===
List of shipwrecks: 30 August 2007
Ship	State	Description
Shelly	Israel	The cargo vessel is accidentally rammed by the cruise liner Salamis Glory (Cyprus), killing two of the cargo vessel's crew members as she sank off Haifa.

== September ==
=== 2 September ===
List of shipwrecks: 2 September 2007
Ship	State	Description
Kayla Marie C	United States	The fishing vessel sank near Old Harbor on the coast of Alaska′s Kodiak Island. The only person aboard survived.

=== 10 September ===
List of shipwrecks: 10 September 2007
Ship	State	Description
Koshio	Sri Lanka Liberation Tigers of Tamil Eelam	Sri Lankan Civil War: The Liberation Tigers of Tamil Eelam supply ship was shelled and sunk 1,620 nautical miles (3,000 km) from Sri Lanka in the Indian Ocean off the Cocos Islands by SLNS Sayura, SLNS Sagara, SLNS Samudura and SLNS Jayasagara (all Sri Lanka Navy).
Manyoshi	Sri Lanka Liberation Tigers of Tamil Eelam	Sri Lankan Civil War: The Liberation Tigers of Tamil Eelam supply ship was shelled and sunk 1,620 nautical miles (3,000 km) from Sri Lanka in the Indian Ocean off the Cocos Islands by SLNS Sayura, SLNS Sagara, SLNS Samudura and SLNS Jayasagara (all Sri Lanka Navy).
Seishin	Sri Lanka Liberation Tigers of Tamil Eelam	Sri Lankan Civil War: The Liberation Tigers of Tamil Eelam supply ship was shelled and sunk 1,620 nautical miles (3,000 km) from Sri Lanka in the Indian Ocean off the Cocos Islands by SLNS Sayura, SLNS Sagara, SLNS Samudura and SLNS Jayasagara (all Sri Lanka Navy).

=== 11 September ===
List of shipwrecks: 11 September 2007
Ship	State	Description
Kepala	United States	Kepala burning. The 50-foot (15.2 m) fishing vessel was destroyed by fire and drifted ashore near Black Point (60°53′N 146°43′W) in Tatitlek Narrows in Prince William Sound on the south-central coast of Alaska. Her crew of three abandoned ship in a life raft and was rescued by the 51-foot (15.5 m) fishing vessel Tri-K (United States).

=== 24 September ===
List of shipwrecks: 24 September 2007
Ship	State	Description
Hero	United States	The 6-gross ton, 30-foot (9.1 m) pump-jet fishing vessel was found capsized and stranded on sand flats in the vicinity of the Egg Islands near Cordova, Alaska. The body of her captain, who had been the only person aboard, later was found on Hinchinbrook Island off on the south-central coast of Alaska.

== October ==
=== 7 October ===
List of shipwrecks: 7 October 2007
Ship	State	Description
Matsushima	Sri Lanka Liberation Tigers of Tamil Eelam	Sri Lankan Civil War: The Liberation Tigers of Tamil Eelam supply ship was shelled and sunk in the Indian Ocean by SLNS Sayura, SLNS Sagara, SLNS Samudura and SLNS Jayasagara (all Sri Lanka Navy).
Seagull Express 2	Malaysia	A ferry to Tioman Island, Malaysia in the South China Sea caught fire and sank; 99 passengers and crew were rescued while 7 drowned.

== November ==
=== 3 November ===
List of shipwrecks: 3 November 2007
Ship	State	Description
HMNZS Canterbury	Royal New Zealand Navy	The Leander-class frigate was scuttled as a dive wreck in the Bay of Islands, New Zealand. 35.1938°S 174.2944°E

=== 8 November ===
List of shipwrecks: 8 November 2007
Ship	State	Description
Hazel Louise	United States	While anchored in Nakwasina Passage (57.2494°N 135.4522°W) near the northern end of Halleck Island (57.2217°N 135.4475°W) in Southeast Alaska north of Sitka, Alaska, the 32-gross ton, 55-foot (16.8 m) fishing vessel suffered one or more explosions, burned to the waterline, and sank. The only person aboard survived.

=== 12 November ===
11 ships sank or ran aground in the Black Sea due to the weather conditions:

List of shipwrecks: 12 November 2007
Ship	State	Description
Hash Izmail	Georgia	The cargo ship carrying steel products sank.
Kovel	Russia	The cargo ship, carrying 2,100 tonnes (2,100 long tons; 2,300 short tons) of sulphur sank during the storm in the middle of the shipping channel of the Kerch Strait (45°09′N 36°33′E). The vessel lies at a depth of 9.3 metres (30 ft 6 in).
Nakhitchevan	Russia	The cargo ship, carrying 2,365 tonnes (2,328 long tons; 2,607 short tons) of sulphur, broke up in the 18-foot (5.5 m) waves and sank at 45°11′N 36°30′E at a depth of 9.5 metres (31 ft).
Volgoneft-139	Russia	During the storm the tanker, carrying 4,800 tonnes (4,700 long tons; 5,300 short tons) of crude oil was struck by 18-foot (5.5 m) waves and broke into two parts with more than 1,300 tonnes (1,300 long tons; 1,400 short tons) of oil escaping into the Kerch Strait. All 13 crew were rescued.
Volnogorsk	Russia	The cargo ship, carrying 2,436 tonnes (2,398 long tons; 2,685 short tons) of sulphur sank during the storm and lies at a depth of 10.6 metres (35 ft). The wreck is located at 45°11′N 36°31′E.

=== 17 November ===
List of shipwrecks: 17 November 2007
Ship	State	Description
Pacific Lady	United States	During a voyage from Sand Point to Kodiak, Alaska, the 42-foot (12.8 m) fishing vessel sank in heavy seas in the Shelikof Strait about 70 nautical miles (130 km; 81 mi) southwest of Kodiak. The only person aboard abandoned ship in a life raft and was rescued by the fishing vessel Heritage (United States).

=== 23 November ===
List of shipwrecks: 23 November 2007
Ship	State	Description
Explorer	Liberia	The cruise ship struck an iceberg and sank close to the South Shetland Islands in the Southern Ocean. One hundred passengers and 54 crew abandoned ship in life rafts. Two other people remained aboard and attempted to stabilize the ship, but gave up and abandoned ship as well. The cruise ship Antarctic Dream (Chile) assisted in rescuing the passengers and crew.

=== 26 November ===
List of shipwrecks: 26 November 2007
Ship	State	Description
Lady Blackie	United States	While towing the fish tender barge Fort Yukon (United States), the 90-foot (27.4 m) fishing vessel ran aground on shoals and sank in Wide Bay (57°22′N 156°11′W) on the south coast of the Alaska Peninsula off the Shelikof Strait after she lost power. Her crew of four and a dog abandoned ship in a life raft and were rescued by a United States Coast Guard helicopter. Fort Yukon drifted away after the towline parted.

=== 27 November ===
List of shipwrecks: 27 November 2007
Ship	State	Description
Fort Yukon	United States	Cast adrift the previous day when her towline parted when her towing vessel, the fishing vessel Lady Blackie (United States), sank in Wide Bay (57°22′N 156°11′W) on the south coast of the Alaska Peninsula off the Shelikof Strait, the 1,403-ton, 197-foot (60.0 m) fish tender barge drifted ashore and was wrecked on the coast of Titcliff Island (57°19′45″N 156°20′10″W) outside Wide Bay.

== December ==
=== 7 December ===
List of shipwrecks: 7 December 2007
Ship	State	Description
Hebei Spirit	Hong Kong	The crude oil tanker collided with a runaway barge while anchored 10 kilometres (5.4 nmi) off Incheon. 10,000 tons of crude oil spilled to the sea, causing the worst oil spill in the history of South Korea.

=== 10 December ===
List of shipwrecks: 10 December 2007
Ship	State	Description
Gregory Poole	United States	The 184-foot (56.1 m) fishing vessel – formerly the Admirable-class minesweeper USS Cruise (United States Navy) – was scuttled in the Atlantic Ocean off the coast of Delaware in 120 feet (37 m) of water at 38°30.9′N 74°30.6′W to form part of an artificial reef.

=== 19 December ===
List of shipwrecks: 19 December 2007
Ship	State	Description
Flying Phantom	United Kingdom	The tug capsized and sank off Clydebank with the loss of three lives. The tug's Danish owner, Svitzer Marine, was subsequently prosecuted and admitted a series of health and safety breaches. MAIB report

=== 25 December ===
List of shipwrecks: 25 December 2007
Ship	State	Description
Eastern Bright	South Korea	The bulk carrier, carrying nitric acid, sank near the Korean coast. Only one seaman was rescued, a Burmese, with fourteen (12 Koreans and 2 Burmese) were reported missing.
SLNS P-413	Sri Lanka Navy	Sri Lankan Civil War: Battle of Delft: The assault boat was sunk by two Liberation Tigers of Tamil Eelam suicide boats.
Unknown boats	Sri Lanka Liberation Tigers of Tamil Eelam	Sri Lankan Civil War: Battle of Delft: The Liberation Tigers of Tamil Eelam lost two, possibly six, assault or suicide boats lost.
