= List of historic ships of the Sri Lanka Navy =

The following is an alphabetical list of historic ships of the Sri Lanka Navy:

== Commissioned vessels ==
A

- HMCyS Aliya - “Empire” Class Seagoing Tug (ex-HMS ADEPT) commissioned on 18 November 1957 and was de-commissioned on 31 March 1963
- SLNS Abeetha (A 516) - former merchant vessel converted to a surveillance and command ship, sunk on 16 August 1994 at Kankesanthurai.
- SLNS Abeetha II (P316) - Shanghai II class Patrol Boat commissioned on 2000 Jun 11

B

- SLNS Balawatha - Shanghai class fast gun boat commissioned in Dec 1972

D

- SLNS Dakshaya - Shanghai class fast gun boat commissioned in Dec 1972
- HMCyS DIYAKAWA - Short Patrol Boat decommissioned in 1960's

E

- SLNS Edithara - former roll-on-roll-off merchant vessel converted to a surveillance and command ship, sunk on 16 July 1995 at Kankesanthurai.
- SLNS Edithara II (P317) - Shanghai II class Patrol Boat commissioned on 2000 Jun 11

G

- SLNS Gajabahu - River class frigate (ex-HMCS Hallowell, ex-Israeli Misnak, ex-HMCyS Gajabahu) -former flagship commissioned on 1960 Apr 26 and decommissioned in 1978
- SLNS Gajabahu (P626) - (ex-USCGC Sherman (WHEC-720)) Commissioned on 2019 Jun 6

H

- HMCyS Hansaya - ‘BIRD’ CLASS Long patrol boat commissioned on 1955 Jan 4 and decommissioned in 1970's
- SLNS Hansaya - Fast Personnel Carrier

J

- SLNS Jagatha (P315) - Shanghai Class fast gun boat commissioned in 1980 and decommissioned on 2020 Oct 12
- SLNS Jayasena - Shanghai class fast gun boat
- SLNS Jayesagra - Jayasagara Class patrol craft commissioned on 1983 Dec 9

K

- SLNS Kandula - Landing Craft Medium commissioned in 1985
- HMCyS Kotiya - Seaward defence boat commissioned on 1955 May 8 and sank at her moorings during the cyclone “Emily” on 1964 Dec 24
- HMCyS KORAWAKKA - Short Patrol Boat and decommissioned in 1960's
- SLNS Korawakka - General duties Patrol craft commissioned in late 1970's

L

- HMCyS Lihiniya - ‘BIRD’ CLASS Long patrol boat commissioned on 1955 Jan 4 and decommissioned in 1970's

M

- HMCyS Mahasena - River class frigate (ex-HMCS Violetta, Orkney and ex-Israeli ship Mivtach) commissioned on 1959 Sep 4 and de-commissioned on 1962 May 31
- SLNS Mihikatha (P350) - (ex-ACV Corio Bay (ACV 50)) Bay Class patrol boat commissioned in 2014 July

N

- SLNS Nandimitra (P701) - (ex-INS Komemiyut) Sa'ar 4 Class missile boat commissioned in 2000

P

- HMCyS Parakrama - Algerine class minesweeper (ex-HMS Plucky (J295)) de-commissioned on 1963 Dec 13
- SLNS Pabbatha - Landing Craft Medium commissioned in 1985
- SLNS Parakramabahu (P 351) - Haiqing class Submarine Chaser -former flagship
- SLNS Parakramabahu (P625) - (ex-Type 053H2G frigate (542 Tongling)) Commissioned on 2019 Aug 22
- SLNS Prathapa (P340 ) - Lushun Class Patrol Boat

R

- SLNS Rakshaka - Shanghai II Class fast gun boat commissioned in 1980
- SLNS Ranakamee - Shanghai II Class fast gun boat commissioned in 1973
- SLNS Ranaviru - Shanghai III Class fast gun boat commissioned in 1991
- SLNS Ranasuru - Shanghai III class fast gun boat commissioned in 1991 and sank at its mooring on 1995 Apr 19
- SLNS Rathnadeepa (P351) - (ex-ACV Hervey Bay (ACV 40)) Bay Class patrol boat commissioned in 2014 July
- SLNS Ranajaya (P330) - Haizhui-class fast gun boat
- SLNS Ranadeera (P331) - Haizhui-class fast gun boat
- SLNS Ranawickrema (P332) - Haizhui-class fast gun boat
- SLNS Ranarisi (P322 ) - Shanghai III Class Patrol Boat commissioned in 1991
- SLNS Ranavijaya (L836) - Ranavijaya Class landing craft
- SLNS Ranagaja (L839) - Ranavijaya Class landing craft

S

- SLNS Sayurala (P623) - Saryu Class Advanced Offshore Patrol Vessel. Current flagship of the navy commissioned on 2017 Aug 2.

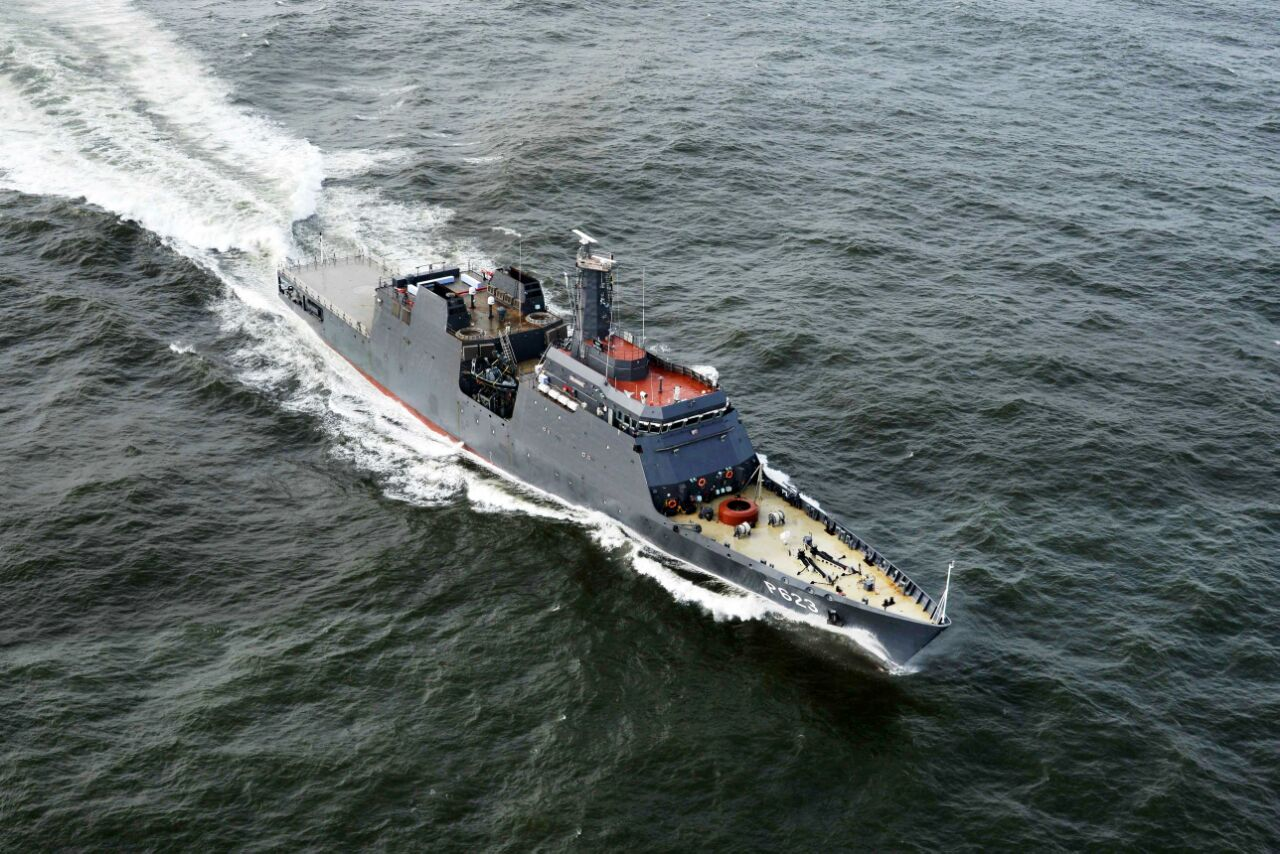
SLNS Sayurala (P623)

- SLNS Sagarawardena - Jayasagara class patrol craft off-shore patrol craft commissioned in 1983 and sunk on 1994 Sep 20
- SLNS Samudra Devi - Shershen class torpedo boat 451 ET 205 commissioned on 1975 Dec 31
- SLNS Sayurala P623 - Vikram Class off-shore patrol craft
- SLNS Sindurala (P624) - Saryu Class Advanced Offshore Patrol Vessel commissioned on 2018 Apr 19.
- SLNS Sooraya - Shanghai class fast gun boat commissioned on 1972 Feb 22 as HMCyS Sooraya and sank at its mooring on 1995 Apr 19
- HMCyS Seruwa - Short Patrol Boat commissioned on 1955 Jul 15 and decommissioned in 1960's
- SLNS Seruwa - General duties Patrol craft commissioned in late 1970's
- SLNS Sayura (P620) - (ex-INS Sarayu) Sukanya class patrol vessel commissioned in 2000
- SLNS Samadura (P621) - (ex-USCGC Courageous (WMEC-622)) medium endurance cutter commissioned in 2005
- SLNS Sagara (P622) - (ex-ICGS Varaha (41)) Vikram Class offshore patrol vessel commissioned in 2006
- SLNS Suranimala (P702) - (ex-INS Moledet) Sa'ar 4 Class missile boat commissioned in 2000
- SLNS Shakthi (L880) - Type 074 landing ship

T

- HMCyS TARAWA - Short Patrol Boat decommissioned in 1960's

U

- SLNS Udara (P341) - Lushun Class Patrol Boat commissioned on 2000 Jun 11

W

- SLNS Weeraya (formally HMCyS Weeraya) (P311) - Shanghai Class fast gun boat commissioned on 1972 Feb 22 and decommissioned on 2020 Oct 12
- SLNS Wickrama II (P318) - Shanghai II Class commissioned on 2000 Jun 11

V

- HMCyS Vijaya - Algerine class minesweeper (ex-HMS Flying Fish (J370)) -former flagship de-commissioned on 1963 Mar 31

== Auxiliary vessels ==
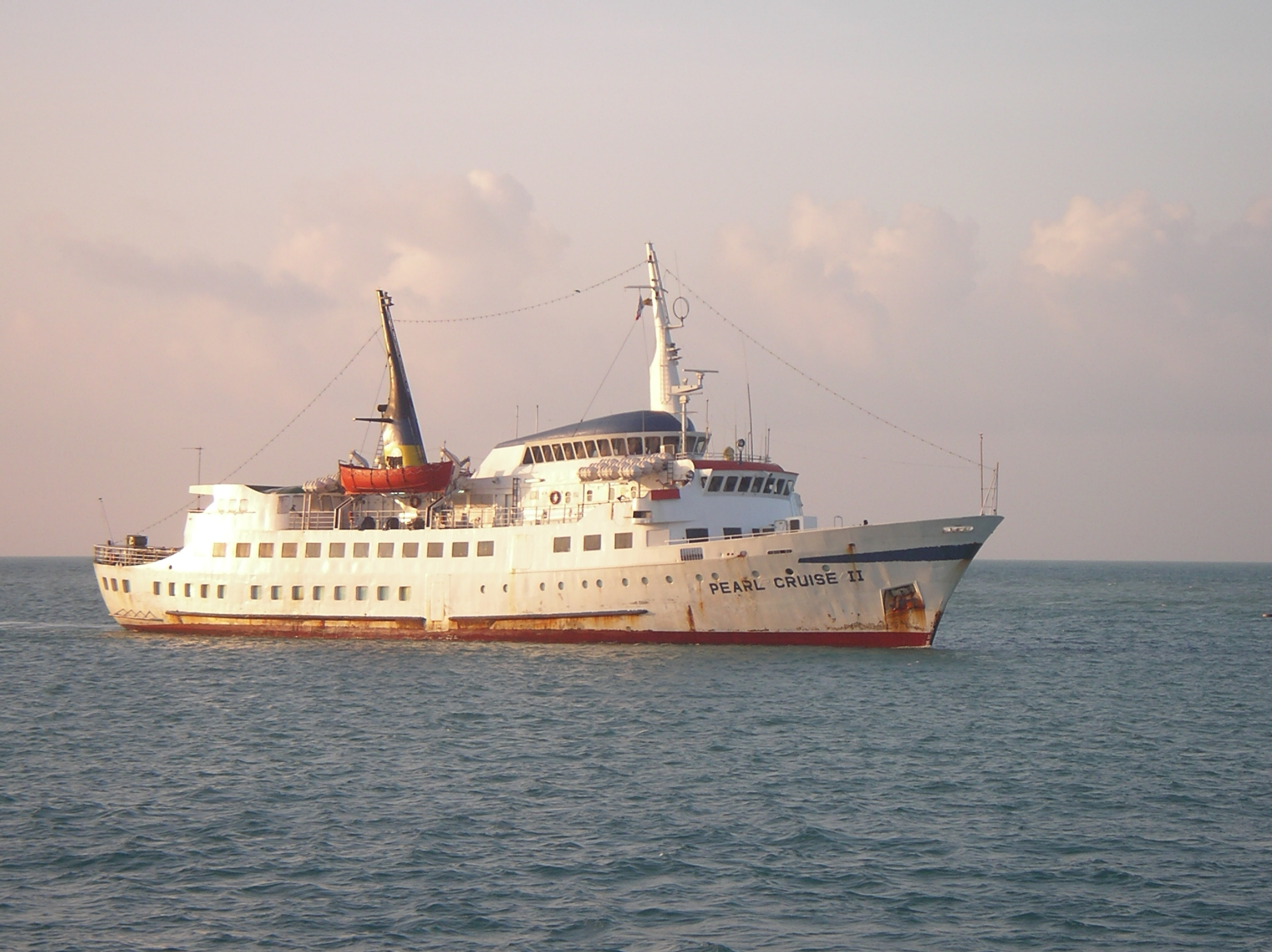
MV Pearl Cruise II Former Sri Lankan troop transport vessel

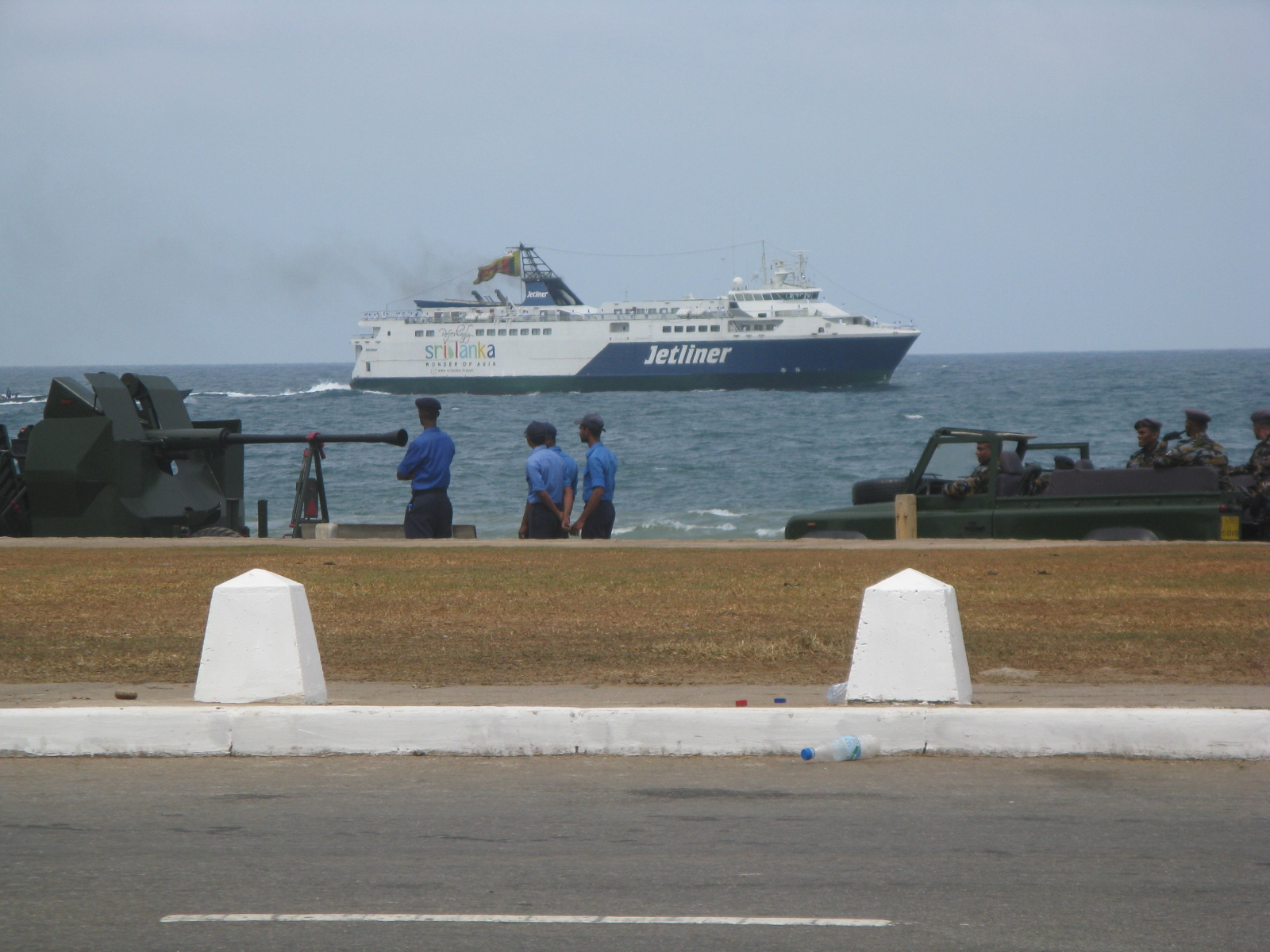
'Jetliner' main troop transport vessel

- A 520
- A 521 -Diving support vessel
- A 530 - ABS M-10 LSC hovercraft used for logistic supply purposes
- A 543
- A 623
- Jetliner - Troopship leased from 2006 to 2012
- MV Pearl Cruise II - Troopship

== See also ==
- List of current Sri Lanka Navy ships
