= Colombo Dockyard =

Sri Lankan ship building company

Colombo Dockyard PLC
- The logo of Colombo Dockyard
- Type: Public
- Traded as: CSE: DOCK.N0000
- ISIN: LK0047N00007
- Industry: Heavy industry; Shipbuilding
- Founded: August 1, 1974; 52 years ago
- Headquarters: Colombo, Sri Lanka
- Key people: Capt. Jagmohan, IN (Retd.) (Non Executive Chairman); Thimira S. Godakumbura (Managing Director/CEO)
- Products: Patrol Boats; Landing crafts; Merchant vessels; Platform supply vessels; Tugboats
- Services: Shipbuilding; Ship repair; Engineering; Defence; Materials sales
- Revenue: ▲LKR9,211 million (2021)
- Operating income: ▲LKR318 million (2021)
- Net income: ▲LKR171 million (2021)
- Total assets: ▲LKR24,081 million (2021)
- Total equity: ▲LKR7,399 million (2021)
- Owner: Mazagon Dock Shipbuilders (51.00%); Employees' Provident Fund (16.34%); Sri Lanka Insurance Corporation Ltd General Fund (5.00%)
- Number of employees: 3,000 (2021)
- Parent: Mazagon Dock Shipbuilders
- Subsidiaries: Dockyard General Engineering Services (Pvt) Ltd; Dockyard Total Solutions (Pvt) Ltd; Ceylon Shipping Agency (Pte) Ltd, Singapore
- Website: www.cdl.lk

Colombo Dockyard PLC (CDPLC) is a ship building company based in Colombo, Sri Lanka. The company specializes in the construction of both military and civilian vessels on behalf of clients in Sri Lanka and international markets.

== History ==
Colombo Dockyard established its operations in 1974 and is one of Sri Lanka's engineering facilities in the business of ship repair, ship building, heavy engineering and offshore engineering. It is situated within the Port of Colombo, which is a deep-water harbor.

Colombo Dockyard has operated in joint collaboration with Onomichi Dockyard Japan since 1993. The collaboration's twenty-year anniversary was celebrated on March 26, 2013.

In 2020 the Colombo Dockyard built Eco bulk carriers for Norwegian Misje Eco Bulk company, Misje subsidiary of Kåre Misje & Co. Colombo Dockyard also built Buoy Tender Vessels to sell to ports of Iraq through Toyota Tsusho Corporation of Japan. Japan International Cooperation Agency (JICA) helped with this project.

In November 2024, the financial crisis of Colombo Dockyard PLC was announced. This was followed by the resignation of its two Japanese directors on 6 December while the Sri Lankan directors remained. The company, with assistance from the Government of Sri Lanka, then sought a strategic investor to purchase the 51% stake from Japan's Onomichi Dockyard Co. Ltd. and also support a rights issue to raise $30 million following an open process through the Sri Lankan embassies. Around 40 expressions of interest (EoIs) were received in response from which five were eventually shortlisted.

=== Acquisition by Mazagon Dock Shipbuilders ===
The Mazagon Dock Shipbuilders, in its regulatory filing on 27 June 2025, announced its decision to acquire a controlling (51%) stake in Sri Lankan peer Colombo Dockyard in a deal worth up to ₹450 crore (US$52.96 million) in order to grow its shipbuilding and repair business. The transaction will be completed within six months following which the Sri Lankan shipbuilder will become a part of Mazagon Dock Shipbuilders. At the end of November 2024, Japan’s Onomichi Dockyard exited its majority stake in Colombo Dockyard. Following this, Colombo reportedly sought New Delhi’s assistance in encouraging Indian investment to avoid default. Mazagon Dock Shipbuilders Ltd was subsequently shortlisted due to its shipbuilding experience and financial capability.

The acquisition worth ₹249.5 crore (US$27 million) was completed by April 2026. The board of Colombo Shipyard was re-constituted with MDL members with effect from 7 April with the Captain Jagmohan, IN (Retd), CMD, MDL being appointed as the Non-Executive Chairman.

Soon after, the acquisitoin infused $40 million into the dockyard.

== Facilities and operation ==
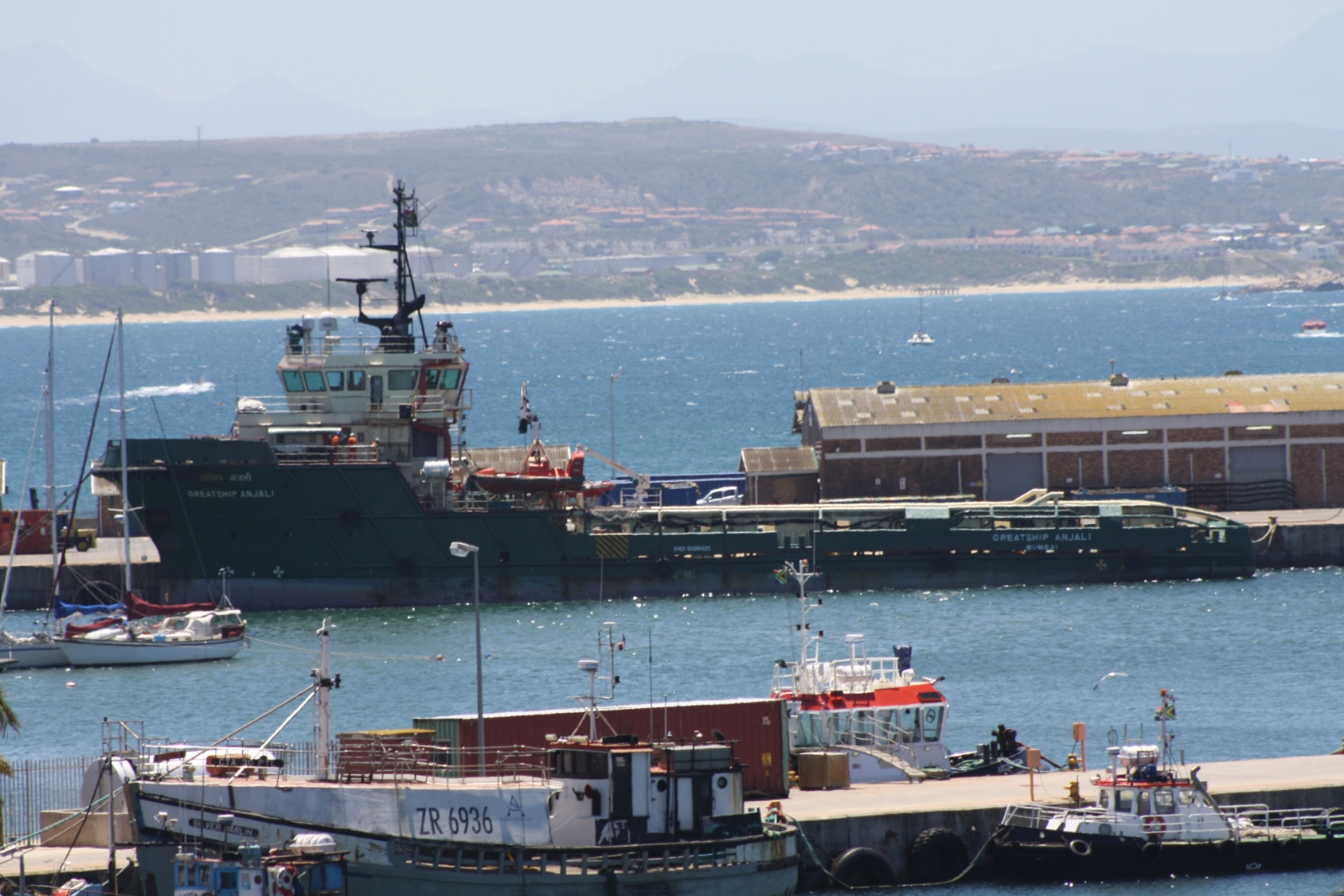
Greatship Anjali built by Colombo Dockyard

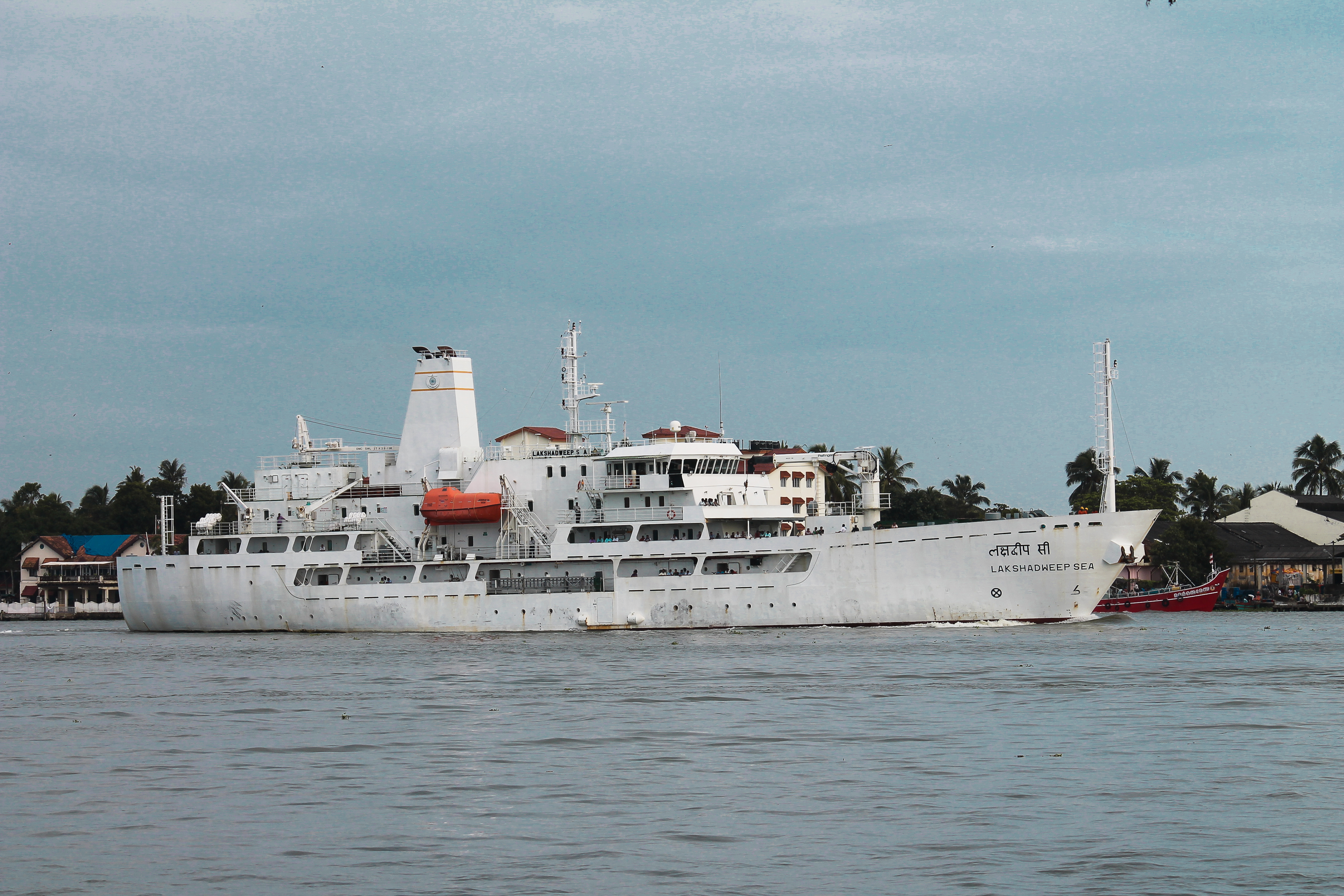
Lakshadweep built by Colombo Dockyard

Colombo Dockyard operates four graving drydocks, the largest one with a capacity of 125,000 tonnes deadweight (DWT) as well as repair berth facilities. It is accredited with the ISO 9001-2015 quality certification by Lloyd's Register Quality Assurance.

== Notable Projects ==
=== Commercial projects ===
Few of Colombo Dockyard's Completed Commercial Projects
Project Name	Ships built	Image	Client	Notes
5,000 DWT Eco Bulk Carrier	Misje Vita; Misje Verde; Misje Viola; Misje Flora; Misje Rose; Misje Lotus; Misje Iris; Misje Lily; Misje Sakura; Misje Kandy		Misje Eco Bulk AS	Launched first vessel in May 2022 and launched 10th and final vessel in January 2026.
VARD 9-01 Cable Laying Vessel	KDDI Cable Infinity		Kokusai Cable Ship Co. Ltd. (KCS)	Delivered 2019. 113.1m, 5,757 DWT, accommodation for 80. Largest vessel built by CDPLC at the time, first cable-layer built in Sri Lanka for Japan.
VARD 9-03 Cable Laying and Repair Vessel (CLRV)	Sophie Germain		Orange Marine	Delivered July 2023. 100m, 1,800 DWT, accommodation for 76. First CLRV delivered to Europe from Sri Lanka.
Buoy tender	Al-Faw; Shatt Al-Arab		State Company for Iraqi Ports	Built under a contract via Toyota Tsusho, with JICA funding.
Multipurpose Platform Supply Vessel	Executive Tide; Executive Sprite; Greatship Anjali and others		Singapore / Indian owners	CDPLC delivered more than 24 Offshore Support Vessels to Singaporean and Indian owners. Chartered to PETROBRAS, PETRONAS, Shell, INPEX, among others.
400 Passenger cum 250T Cargo Vessel	MV Corals		Union Territory of Lakshadweep Administration	MV Corals delivered October 2014. Designed for carriage of passengers and general cargo between mainland India and Lakshadweep.
250 Passenger cum 100T Cargo Vessel	MV Arabian Sea; MV Lakshadweep Sea		Union Territory of Lakshadweep Administration	
65 Ton Bollard Pull Tug / Anchor Handling Tug Supply Vessel	80T Bollard Pull AHTS; 130T Bollard Pull AHTS		Various	Part of CDPLC's standard commercial tug / offshore support portfolio listed in company shipbuilding portfolio.

=== Military projects ===
Few of Colombo Dockyard's Completed Military Projects
Project Name	Ships built	Image	Client	Notes
Jayasagara-class patrol boat	SLNS Jayasagara		Sri Lanka Navy; Sri Lanka Coast Guard	Originally built for SLN. Transferred to SLCG.
Jayasagara-class patrol boat	SLNS Sagarawardena		Sri Lanka Navy	Sunk
Ranavijaya-class landing craft utility	SLNS Ranagaja		Sri Lanka Navy	
Ranavijaya-class landing craft utility	SLNS Ranavijaya		Sri Lanka Navy	
Ultra Fast Attack Craft	22 projects were made		Sri Lanka Navy	
Ultra Fast Attack Craft	22 projects were made		Maldivian Coast Guard	
Ultra Fast Attack Craft	22 projects were made		Sri Lanka Coast Guard	Originally built for SLN. Transferred to SLCG.

== Clients ==
=== Military clients ===
- Sri Lanka Navy
- Sri Lanka Coast Guard
- Maldivian Coast Guard

=== International clients ===
- Bourbon (France)
- Columbia Shipmanagement (Singapore)
- Dredging Corporation of India
- Dredging International (Belgium)
- Eurobulk (Greece)
- GOL Offshore (India)
- The Greatship Group (India)
- Hyundai Engineering & Construction (South Korea)
- Kotoku Kaiun (Japan)
- Maersk (Denmark)
- Mercator (India)
- Safety Management Overseas (Greece)
- Shipping Corporation of India
- Pakistan National Shipping Corporation
- Sinochem Shipping (China)
- Tanker Pacific (Singapore)
- Thome (Singapore)
- Tide Water (United States)
- Titan Fleet Management (France)
- Van Oord (Netherlands)
- Orange Marine (France)
