= Sri Lanka Coast Guard =

Sri Lanka Coast Guard ශ්‍රී ලංකා වෙරළාරක්ෂක දෙපාර්තමේන්තුව இலங்கை கடலோர பாதுகாப்பு
- Sri Lanka Coast Guard crest

- Racing stripe

- Ensign
- Abbreviation: SLCG
- Motto: Serene Sea

Agency overview
- Formed: 2010

Jurisdictional structure
- Operations jurisdiction: Sri Lanka
- Constituting instrument: Coast Guard Coast Guard Act, No. 41 of 2009
- Specialist jurisdiction: Coastal patrol, marine border protection, marine search and rescue

Operational structure
- Overseen by: Ministry of Defence
- Headquarters: Mirissa
- Agency executives: Rear Admiral Ruwan Rupasena, Director General; Commodore Prasad Jayasinghe, Deputy Director General

Website
- www.coastguard.gov.lk

The Sri Lanka Coast Guard (SLCG) (Sinhala: ශ්‍රී ලංකා වෙරළාරක්ෂක දෙපාර්තමේන්තුව, romanized: Śrī Laṃkā veralārakshaka depārtamēntuwa; Tamil: இலங்கை கடலோர பாதுகாப்பு) is a Sri Lankan non-ministerial government department tasked with coast guard duties within the territorial waters of Sri Lanka. It comes under the purview of the Ministry of Defence and its members are all naval personnel. The current Director General of the SLCG is Rear Admiral Ruwan Rupasena, RWP, RSP, psc

Initially established in the late 1990s, the department was disbanded in 2002, with responsibilities passing to the Coast Conservation Department. The department in its current form was reestablished through the Department of Coast Guard Act, No. 41 of 2009 and inaugurated on 4 March 2010. It is a non-military law enforcement agency at sea, with every officer regarded as a peace officer for the purposes of the Code of Criminal Procedure Act, No. 15 of 1979. The department has legal authority to search and arrest ships, craft and personnel engaged in illegal activity in maritime zones and the territorial waters of Sri Lanka, and to initiate legal proceedings against offenders.

== History ==
The Sri Lanka Coast Guard was first established in 1999, when 75 servicepersons were recruited Officers, Sergeants and Mariners; at the same time, construction of vessels for the coast guard began at the Neil Marine and Ceynor boatyards. On 1 August of the following year, the cabinet approved a paper appointing a retired Naval officer, Lieutenant commander C. R. Bulegoda Arachchi, as head of the Coast Guard. The government then began drafting the Sri Lanka Coast Guard Act based on counterparts from other nations in the region. 2001 saw the basic training of Coast Guard personnel begin at the navy's base at Welisara, SLNS Gemunu; professional training took place at the Japanese Coast Guard Training Center in Tokyo. Six small vessels for the SLCG were launched at the fishery harbour in Beruwala: Coast Guard Vessel Mahiraja was put in charge of search and rescue, CGVs Ruhunu and Maya were assigned to the protection of coastal fisheries, and CGVs Kadira, Giruvaya and Maagama were placed on general duty. Less than a year later, on 31 March 2002, the newly elected government decided to abolish the department, transferring all assets and personnel to the Coast Conservation Department.

In 2009, the Minister of Defence President Mahinda Rajapaksa presented a cabinet paper suggesting the reestablishment of the Coast Guard, leading to the Sri Lanka Coast Guard Coast Guard Act, No. 41 of 2009 being enacted by parliament on 9 July 2009. The SLCG was thus reestablished in its current form seven years after its initial disbanding.

Recent developments have largely been centered on expansion of operational capabilities, with Japan forming a partnership with the SLCG in 2016 to secure trade routes in the Indian Ocean, particularly those used by oil tankers from the Middle East. As part of this partnership, Japan provided funds for patrol ships. The Sri Lankan Government also placed a $180 million order for three 85-meter offshore patrol vessels from Colombo Dockyard in 2017, capable of both deep- and shallow water operations.

== Role and responsibilities ==
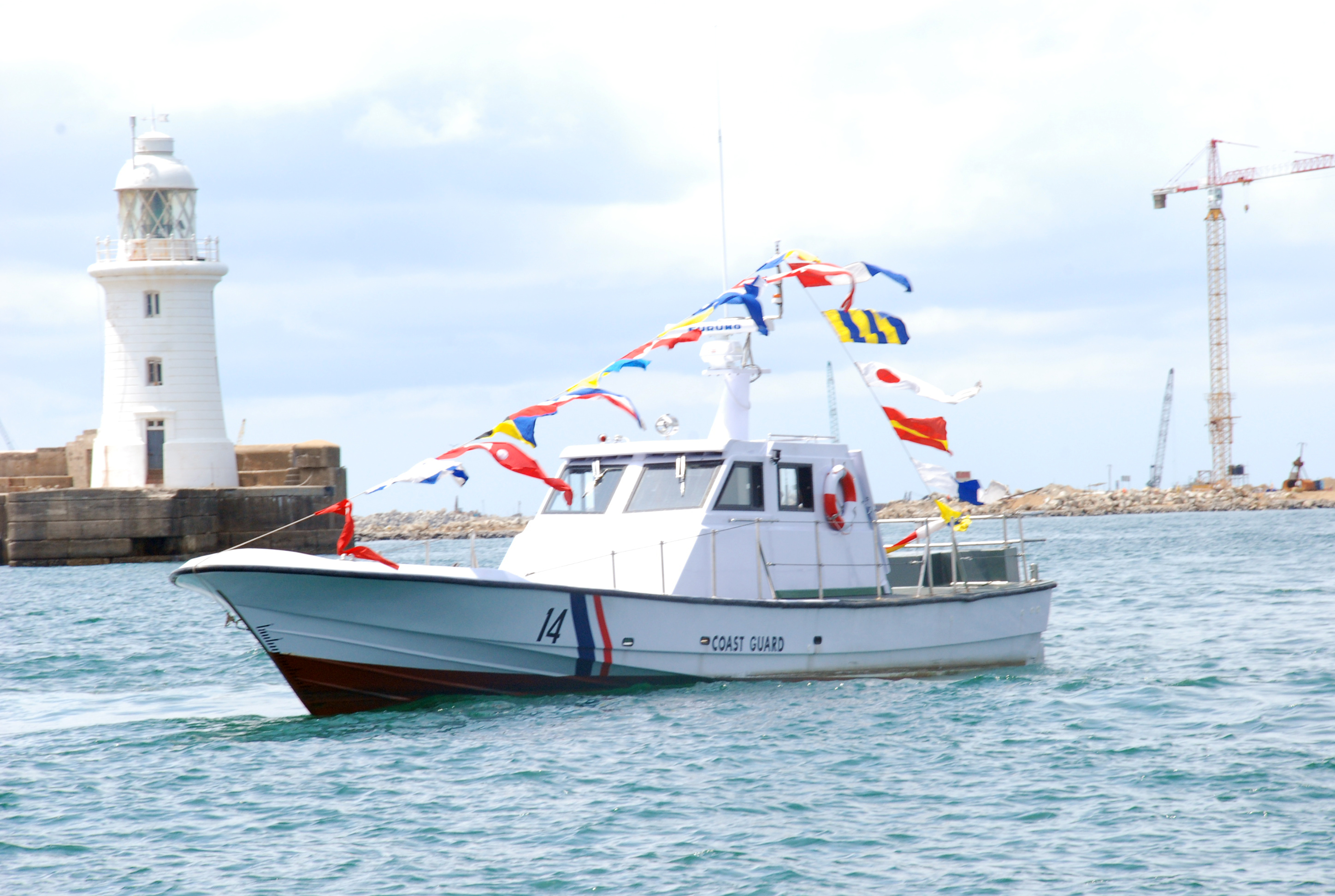
SLCG inshore patrol craft

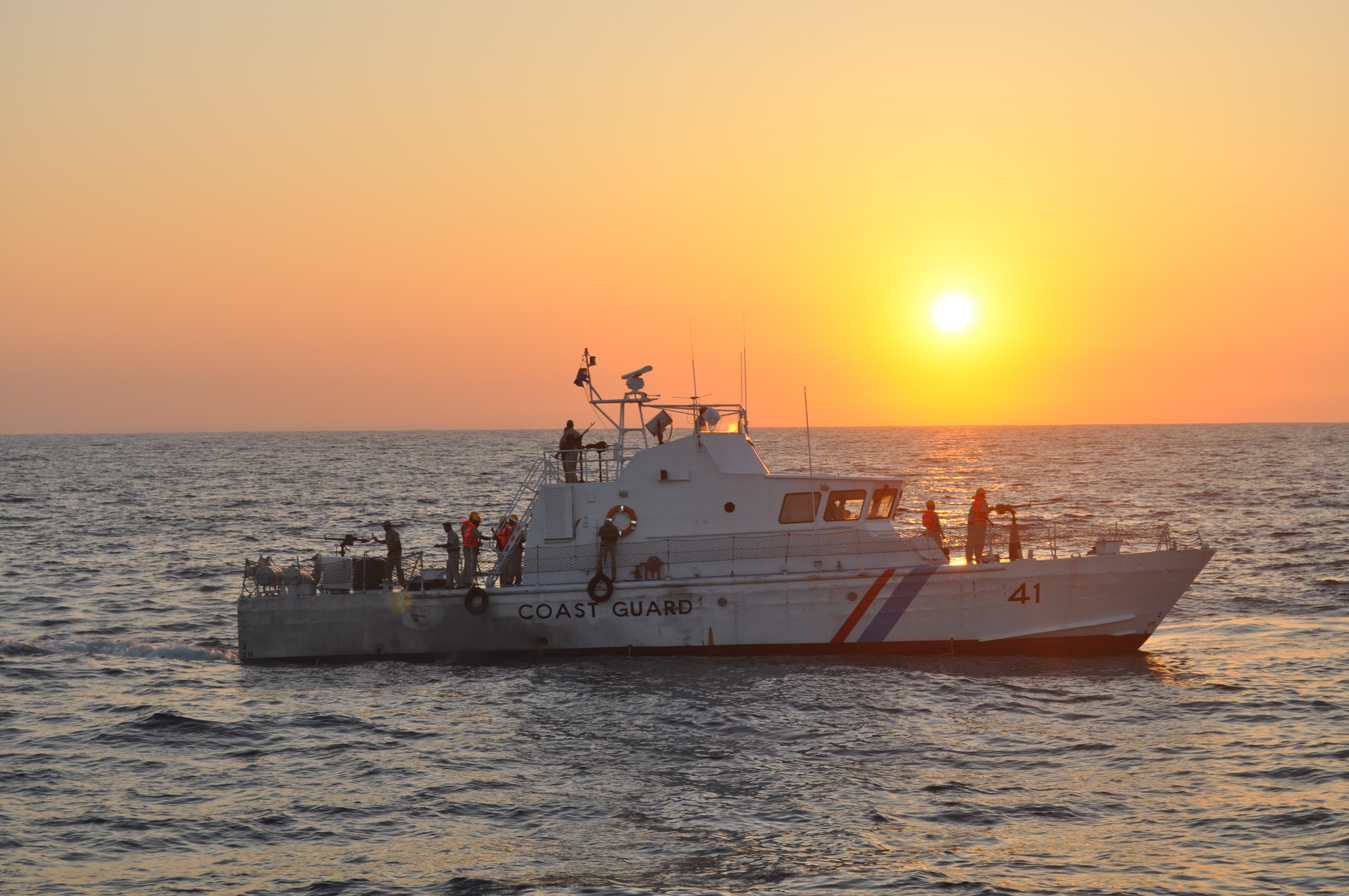
A fast patrol craft belonging to the SLCG

Part II of the Coast Guard Act lists the following as functions of the SLCG:

- Prevent illegal fishing in the coastal areas of Sri Lanka, and protect fishermen, rendering whatever assistance is needed at sea,
- Assist the Sri Lanka Customs and other authorities to combat anti-smuggling and anti-immigration operations,
- Prevent and manage piracy,
- Cooperate with law enforcement and the armed forces in anti-terror measures in the maritime zones and territorial waters of the country,
- Prevent the cross-border movement of narcotics by sea,
- Assist in ensuring the safety of life and property at sea,
- Participate in search and rescue operations in times of natural catastrophe and assist in salvage operations after such catastrophes and other accidents at sea,
- Assist in the preservation and protection of the maritime and marine environment, including the implementation and monitoring of measures required for the prevention and control of marine pollution and other disasters which occur at sea, and in the conservation of marine species,
- Disseminate information including warnings by radio or any other means in times of natural catastrophes, and
- Perform any additional/auxiliary functions that may be temporarily assigned to it by the State.

In order to carry out these functions, the Coast Guard is given the authority to:

- Stop, enter, board, inspect and search any place, structure, vessel or aircraft and arrest and detain any such vessel or aircraft,
- Demand, make copies- or take extracts of any license, permit, record, certificate or any other document for inspection,
- Investigate any offence which it has reason to believe is being committed or is about to be committed or has been committed,
- Exercise the right of hot pursuit,
- Examine and seize or dispose of any fish or any article, device, goods, vessel, aircraft or any other item relating to any offence which has been committed or it has reasonable grounds to believe that such offence has been committed, and
- Arrest any person whom it has reason to believe has committed an offence under any written law of Sri Lanka currently in force.

=== Deployment ===
The Coast Guard have a base or outpost in Mirissa (coast guard headquarters), Mirissa (regional headquarters- South), Dikovita, Dehiwala, Mount Lavinia, Panadura, Beruwala, Aluthgama, Balapitiya, Ambalangoda, Kirinda and Kankasanturai (regional headquarters- North). Some of these, particularly those in areas frequented by tourists, also function as lifeguard posts; the SLCG has lifeguard posts at:

- Galle Face
- Wellawatta
- Mount Lavinia
- Panadura
- Aluthgama
- Balapitiya
- Mirissa
- Polhena-Matara
- Kirinda
- Nilaveli (2 points)
- Dehiwala

The SLCG base at Balapitiya hosts a training center that conducts professional- and lifesaving training to its servicepersons. Mirissa hosts the Coast Guard Turtle Conservation Project, launched in September 2012. Aiming to preserve the country's sea turtle population and raise awareness of their conservation, it also supplies scientific data related to turtle behaviour (nesting, hatchlings, feeding, mating) to researchers in the field.

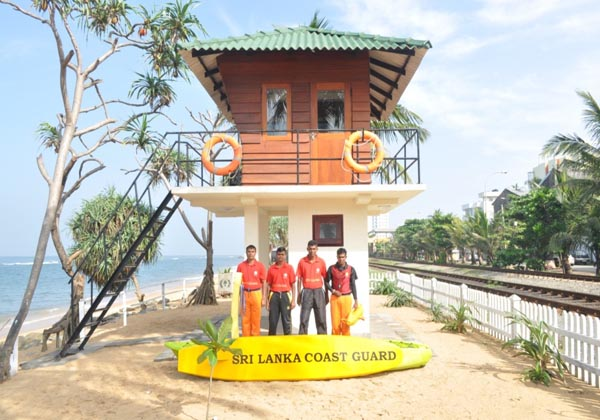
Lifesaving post, Wellawatta

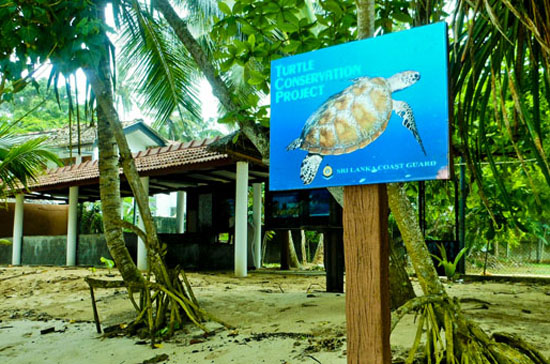
Turtle conservation project

== Rank structure ==
The Sri Lanka Coast Guard's rank structure closely follows that of the Navy.

Commissioned officer ranks

Rank group	General / flag officers		Senior officers			Junior officers
Sri Lanka Coast Guard
Sri Lanka Coast Guard	Rear admiral	Commodore	Captain	Commander	Lieutenant commander	Lieutenant	Sub-lieutenant

Other ranks

Rank group	Senior NCOs				Junior NCOs		Enlisted
Sri Lanka Coast Guard
Sri Lanka Coast Guard	Master chief petty officer	Senior chief petty officer	Chief petty officer	Petty officer	Leading rating	Able rate	Ordinary rate

== Equipment ==
=== Current vessels ===
Vessels belonging to the Sri Lankan Coast Guard bear the prefix "CG".

Class	Picture	Origin	Type	Quantity	Displacement	Vessels	Comment
Offshore patrol vessels (1)
Vikram-class		India	Offshore patrol vessels	1	1180 tons	SLCGS Suraksha	Commissioned in 2017
Jayasagara Class		Sri Lanka	Offshore patrol vessels	1	330 tons		Former navy ship handed over to coast guard in 2021
Future Offshore patrol vessels (3)
VARD 7 085		Sri Lanka	Offshore patrol vessels	3	1900 tons		The Sri Lankan cabinet approved a $180 million order for three OPVs built at the Colombo Dockyard to a Vard 7 85 metre design. Two similar vessels were built for the New Zealand navy as the Protector-class offshore patrol vessel
Patrol boats
30m Type Patrol Boat		Japan	Patrol Boat	2	123 tons	CG 501 SLCGS Samudraraksha; CG 502 SLCGS Samaraksha	Range- 750 nautical miles. Built by Sumidagawa Shipyard, Tokyo; Comes equipped with pollution control equipment and the ability to contain and disperse oil spills.
Stabicraft		Australia	Patrol Boat	3	-		
Colombo-class		Sri Lanka	Fast Patrol Boat	10	52/56 tons		Built by Colombo Dockyard.
Inshore Patrol Craft		Sri Lanka	Inshore Patrol Craft	10			Built by Sri Lanka Navy and Colombo Dockyard
Personal Water Craft (PWC)		India	Jet ski	2			Gifted by India in 2026 for near shore search & rescue.
