= SLNS Sagarawardena =

Former ship in the Sri Lanka Navy (1983–1992)

History

Sri Lanka
- Builder: Colombo Dockyard Limited
- Launched: 1983
- Commissioned: 1983
- Fate: Sunk

General characteristics
- Type: Offshore patrol vessel
- Displacement: 330 tons full load
- Length: 39.8 metres
- Beam: 7 metres
- Draught: 2.2 meters
- Propulsion: 2 × diesel engines, 2 shafts, 2,040 bhp
- Speed: 15 knots (28 km/h; 17 mph)
- Complement: 52
- Sensors & processing systems: civil navigation radar and day/night Optics.
- Armament: 1 dual 25mm, 2 dual 14.5mm, 1 40mm L/70? and additional armaments.
- Aircraft carried: none
- Aviation facilities: none

SLNS Sagarawardena (P-602) (Sagarawardena, in Sinhalese: Sea advancer) was an Offshore Patrol Vessel (OPV) of the Sri Lanka Navy. It was the second ship of the locally built Jayasagara class. The ship was sunk in 1994 when it was hit by two suicide crafts of the LTTE whilst on routine patrol off the coast of Mannar.

== Operations ==
Sagarawardena was the second ship of the Jayasagara class to join the Sri Lanka Navy and was assigned duty of offshore patrols to counter arms smuggling in the early stages of the Sri Lankan Civil War.

On 20 September 1994, she sailed from Colombo along the coast of Mannar on patrol with Commander Ajith Boyagoda as captain and a crew of 42 officers and men. It was tasked with monitoring LTTE communications during patrol.

Around 11.55 pm Sagarawardena was attacked by a large group of LTTE boats with two explosive laden suicide crafts ramming into the ship, exploding on impact. Following the two initial explosions the ship began to sink.

Of the crew of 43 there were 18 survivors including its captain Commander Ajith Boyagoda, who was captured along with another crewmen by the LTTE. Until his release in 2002 Boyagoda would be the most senior officer in LTTE detention. At the time of its sinking it was the largest ship in the Sri Lankan navy and its sister ship SLNS Jayasagara was the flagship of the fleet.
