= Director General of Sri Lanka Coast Guard =

Sri Lanka Coast Guard
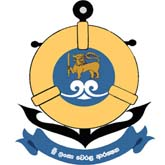
- Sri Lanka Coast Guard crest
- Active: 2010–Present
- Country: Sri Lanka
- Type: Coast Guard
- Part of: Ministry of Defence
- Headquarters: Mirissa
- Motto(s): Serene Sea
- Anniversaries: Coast Guard Day: 4 March
- Website: coastguard.gov.lk

Commanders
- Director General: Rear Admiral Rajapriya Serasinghe
- Deputy Director General: Deputy Director General Commodore TAM Leelarathne

Insignia
- Ensign

The Director General of Sri Lanka Coast Guard is the professional head of the Sri Lanka Coast Guard. He is the most senior officer in Sri Lanka Coast Guard and oversees all Coast Guard personnel throughout the country. The DG SLCG reports to the minister of defence, when the Coast Guard Service is under the Ministry of Defence as it is currently. The current director general of Sri Lanka Coast Guard is Rear Admiral Rajapriya Serasinghe.

== See also ==
- Sri Lanka Coast Guard
