= Cadex 2009 =

Military training exercise involving the Indian Navy

Cadex 2009 was a military training exercise involving the Indian Navy, Sri Lanka Navy and the Indian Coast Guard. The three-day-long training exercise was held from 6 October to 8 October 2009. Training exercises between the two countries had been held annually, but this had been delayed because of the Sri Lankan Civil War. It was also the first training exercise between the two navies since the end of the war.

The Indian vessels that participated in the Cadex 2009 exercises were INS Shardul, a landing ship tank of the India Navy and INCGS Varuna, an offshore patrol vessel of the Indian Coast Guard. The offshore patrol vessels SLNS Sayura and SLNS Samudura, along with the transport vessel A521 were the participating vessels from the Sri Lanka Navy.

== Preparations ==
The Indian Navy was invited for the exercises by Vice Admiral Thisara Samarasinghe, the Commander of the Sri Lanka Navy. Cadex 2009 was initiated despite accusations from some Indian media that the Sri Lanka Navy had killed more than 50 South Indian fishermen. The plans for the exercise were not revealed until the day the Indian cadets arrived in Sri Lanka.

The Indian cadets who participated in the exercise were from the 1st Training Squadron, based in Kochi. They arrived at the Colombo Harbour on 5 October 2009 aboard the INS Krishna and the two vessels that participated in the exercise, Shardul and Varuna.

Cadex 2009 was intended to provide an opportunity for the Sri Lankan cadets to train on board Indian ships and to "enhance and exchange knowledge". The Indian cadets, in turn, were to "familiarize themselves with (Sri Lankan) tri-forces military training institutions" and also to visit places of historical and cultural value in order to "strengthen the ties between the two countries".

== Training exercise ==
100 Sri Lankan cadets from the Naval and Maritime Academy at Trincomalee, and 141 Indian cadets took part in the exercises. The vessels set out from the Colombo harbour at 9.00 am (local time, UTC+5:30) and sailed for five hours before arriving at the planned location for the exercises, 35 nautical miles (65 km; 40 mi) south west of the Colombo harbour. The Sri Lanka Navy also took media personnel aboard the SLNS Hansaya to report the exercise.

A cordon was set up around the area by Fast Attack Craft of the Sri Lanka Navy. Live fire exercises were started on the night of 6 October. The exercises included a visit, board, search, and seizure (VBSS) training for the Sri Lanka Navy's Special Boat Squadron, and helicopter landings aboard the Shardul and Sayura. The ships returned to the Colombo harbour on 8 October.

The Indian cadets also visited the Sri Lanka Military Academy in Diyatalawa, the Naval and Maritime Academy in Trincomalee and the General Sir John Kotelawala Defence University in Kandawala. They also visited places of "cultural and historical value" in the country.

== Reception ==
According to the Sri Lanka Navy, the training exercise reflects the "mutual cooperation of the two friendly navies and the long standing bilateral relations of the two neighbouring nations". However, some Tamil Nadu politicians had expressed dissatisfaction at the Indian Navy agreeing to hold Cadex 2009 with the Sri Lanka Navy. This friction is even stronger after alleged attacks on Indian fishermen by Sri Lanka Navy on January 12, 2011 near Tamil Nadu.
