= Ultra Fast Attack Craft =

Sri Lankan ultra high-speed class of patrol boats

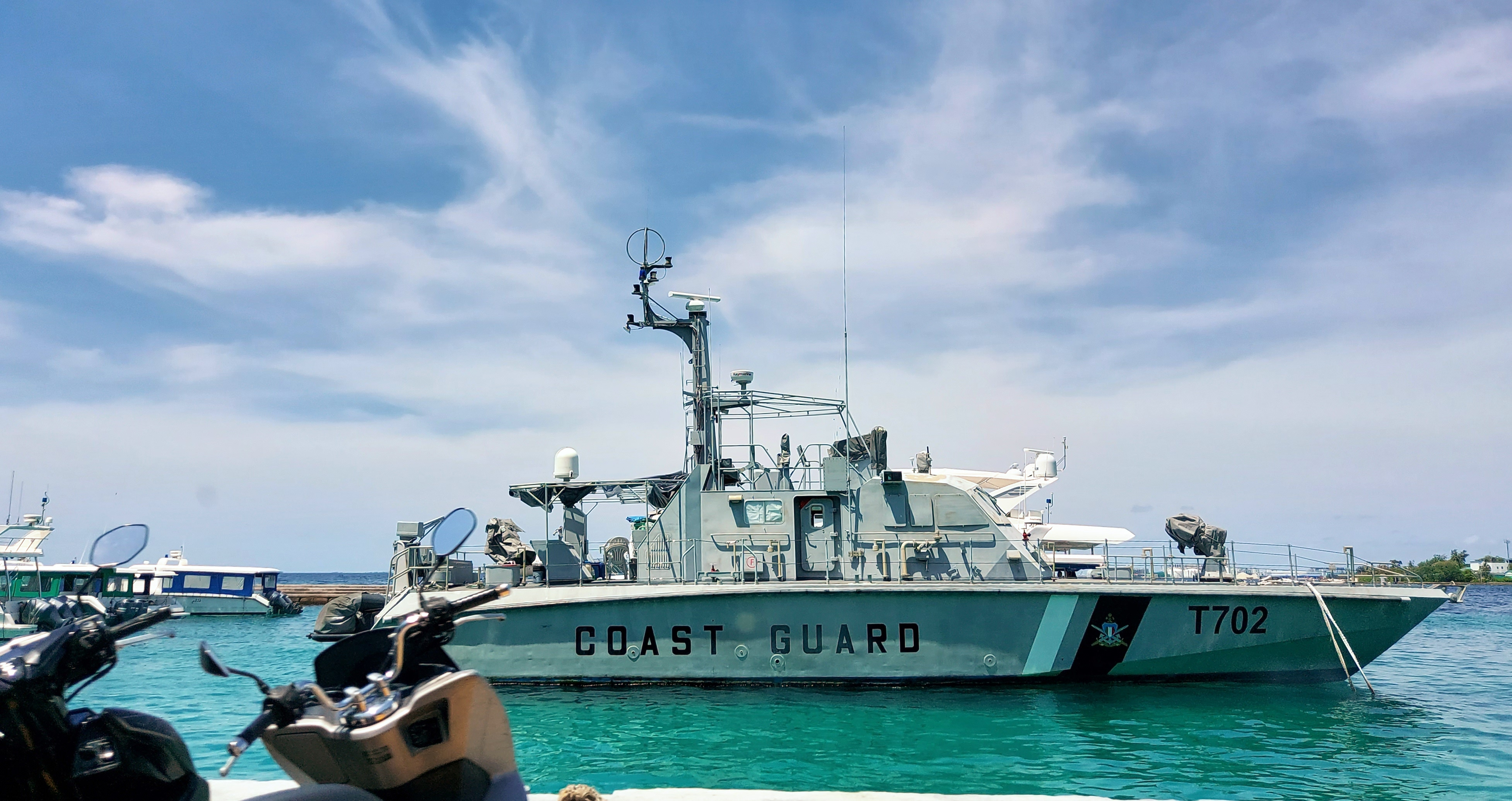
- MNDF Coast Guard Colombo-class coastal surveillance vessel Iskandhar in 2021.

Class overview
- Name: Colombo class
- Builders: Colombo Dockyard Limited
- Operators: See Operators
- Subclasses: See Subclasses
- Cost: USD$2.95 million (Series III)
- In commission: 1996

General characteristics
- Type: Ultra fast attack craft
- Displacement: 52 long tons (53 t) (Series I and II) 56 long tons (57 t) (Series III)
- Length: 24.3 m (79 ft 9 in) (Series I and II) 24 m (78 ft 9 in) (Series III)
- Beam: 5.7 m (18 ft 8 in)
- Draught: 3 m (9 ft 10 in) (Series I and II) 1.2 m (3 ft 11 in) (Series III) 1.30 m (4 ft 3 in) (Maldives)
- Propulsion: 2 × MTU 12V 396 TE 94 (1,630 kW; 2,190 hp each) driving with 2 x Kamewa water jets; and; 2 × DEUTZ TBD 620 V16 main engines (3,410 kW; 4,570 hp each) and two Arneson ASD-16 articulating surface drives (Sri Lanka); 2 x Paxman-Vega diesel engines driving with 2 x Kamewa water jets (Maldives)
- Speed: 45 knots (83 km/h; 52 mph) (Series I and II) and 53 knots (98 km/h; 61 mph) (Series III)
- Range: 500–600 nmi (930–1,110 km; 580–690 mi)
- Complement: 10–12
- Armament: 1 x Typhoon stabilized system with M242 Bushmaster/Oerlikon 20 mm cannon, Automatic grenade launcher and machine guns (Sri Lanka); 1x 20 mm machine gun and 2x 7.62mm machine guns (Maldives)

The Ultra Fast Attack Craft, commonly known as the Ultra Fast-Attack Craft, the UFAC, or Colombo class, is a Sri Lankan ultra high-speed class of patrol boats meant for a variety of naval missions from off-shore coastal patrol missions to high-speed, high-maneuver littoral warfare. They are based on the Shaldag boats made by Israel.

Built by Colombo Dockyard Limited for the Sri Lanka Navy (SLN), they became the workhorse of the SLN against Sea tiger boats of the LTTE in the Sri Lankan civil war.

== History ==
=== Sri Lankan service ===
Deliveries of the P450 and P451 were in 1996 as the first UFACs in the SLN. The P490-492, P494, P494 and the P497 were delivered in 1997. The P410-P415, the P417 and P419-P424 were delivered in 2000. P430 and P432-439 were delivered in 2005.

In 2000, P493 and P496 were sunk. On 27 December 2007, one UFAC Series II (P413) was destroyed and another damaged during an encounter between Sri Lankan Navy and Sea Tiger patrol boats between Delft Island and Mannar. In May 2006, P418 was sunk. On 22 March 2008, a UFAC (P438) was taken out via Sea Tiger suicide attack at the waters off Nayaru and the Kokilai lagoon south of Mulaithivu District. P434 was taken out in 2009.

In 2003, P474 and P494 were deployed to intercept a tanker ship used by the LTTE with no losses.

In August 2017, the crew of P494 rescued four Indian fisherman from drowning at 8.5 nautical miles west of Analaitivu island.

==== Modernization ====
The P494, in service from 1997, taken off service briefly for retrofitting from October 2019 to January 2022 to replace engines and drive control systems alongside the deck exterior.

=== Maldivian service ===
The first coastal surveillance vessel was made in 1997 and delivered for the MNDF Coast Guard on 20 January 1998 as the Nooradheen T701 (ex-P214), formerly known as the Ghazee. Another was delivered on 7 December 1998 as the Iskandhar T702 (ex-223).

The MNDF reported that the Iskandhar was not operational in 2012 while the Nooradheen was not operational since 2016 due to lack of coast guard docking facilities to properly conduct maintenance. As of 2020, they are still in operation.

== Subclasses ==
The Sri Lankan UFACs are divided into series, consisting of Series I, II, III and IV. (Note: Jane's Fighting Ships classifies them as Mark (Mark I, II, III and IV).)

=== Series I ===
The boats of the Series I are 24 m (78 ft 9 in) long with a monohull with a vibration-free deck, powered by twin MTU main engines developing 1,630 kW (2,190 hp) each, driving Kamewa water jets. This enables the boat to reach speeds of 45 knots (83 km/h; 52 mph) and have an endurance of 500 nautical miles (930 km; 580 mi). They have a crew of 10.

Around 12 were delivered to the Sri Lanka Navy (SLN) in 1996.

=== Series II ===
Series II is the successor to the earlier type. Main upgrades include the increase of accommodation for a crew of 12 and major improvements the superstructure.

Like the Series I, around 12 were delivered to the SLN in 1997.

=== Series III ===
The Series III has incorporated current combat requirements and experience in the battlefield archived by the SLN. This new type can achieve speeds in excess of 53 knots (98 km/h; 61 mph), the fastest of its class in the region while housing up to 12 persons in a crew.

The propulsion system consists of two Deutz diesel engines driving two articulated surface drives, which were initially designed for competitive speedboats. Arneson Surface Drive-16 articulating propulsion systems drives provide the vessel with thrust vectoring control similar to the Super Dvora Mk III and Shaldag Mk II.

36 Series III UFACs were known to be built and delivered for the SLN in 2000.

=== Series IV ===
Similar to Series III, they share the same Deutz engines.

These boats were delivered to the SLN in 2005.

=== Coastal surveillance vessel ===
The two coastal surveillance vessels built for the Maldivian Coast Guard are very similar to the Series III Ultra Fast Attack Craft. The ships have more range but at a lower speed of 40 knots (74 km/h; 46 mph). They have a crew complement of 18. These boats are outfitted with Paxman-Vega diesel engines and Kamewa waterjets.

These vessels have no armaments. But according to Jane's Fighting Ships, the two vessels are equipped with one 20mm machine gun and two 7.62mm machine guns.

== Systems ==
=== Sri Lanka ===
All Colombo-class boats have been designed to allow for the installation of Typhoon 25-30 mm stabilized cannon which can be slaved to state-of the art mast-mounted, day and night all weather long range electro-optic systems. In addition, they carry additional weapon systems such as 20 mm Oerlikon rear autocannons, automatic grenade launchers, 7.62 mm GPMGs and 12.7 mm HMGs.

These boat also use surface search: Furano FR 8250 or Corden Mk 2; I-band as its radar.

=== Maldives ===
The boats delivered to the Maldives only have one 20 mm machine gun and two 7.62 mm machine guns.

They use JRC-JMA 3625; JRC-JMA 3204; I-band for radar.

== Ships ==
The following are the UFACs used by Sri Lanka and the Maldives:

=== Sri Lankan Navy ===
| Hull No. | Type | Builder | Laid down | Commissioned | Status | Reference/s |
|---|---|---|---|---|---|---|
| P450 | Series I | Colombo Dockyard Limited | | 1996 | In Service as of 2025. | |
| P451 | Series I | Colombo Dockyard Limited | | 1996 | Reportedly decommissioned. | |
| P490 | Series II | Colombo Dockyard Limited | | 1997-1999 | Sunk in 2000 by Sea Tigers. | |
| P491 | Series II | Colombo Dockyard Limited | | 1997-1999 | Reportedly decommissioned. | |
| P492 | Series II | Colombo Dockyard Limited | | 1997-1999 | Reportedly decommissioned. | |
| P493 | Series II | Colombo Dockyard Limited | | 1997-1999 | Sunk in 21 March 2001 by Sea Tigers. | |
| P494 | Series II | Colombo Dockyard Limited | | 1997-1999 | Reportedly decommissioned. However, Sri Lankan Navy reported to be in operational after retrofitting in 2022. | |
| P495 | Series II | Colombo Dockyard Limited | | 1997-1999 | Sunk by Sea Tigers. No date. | |
| P496 | Series II | Colombo Dockyard Limited | | 1997-1999 | Sunk in 2000 by Sea Tigers. | |
| P497 | Series II | Colombo Dockyard Limited | | 1997-1999 | Reportedly decommissioned. | |
| P410 | Series III | Colombo Dockyard Limited | | 2000-2004 | Reportedly decommissioned. | |
| P411 | Series III | Colombo Dockyard Limited | | 2000-2004 | Reportedly decommissioned. | |
| P412 | Series III | Colombo Dockyard Limited | | 2000-2004 | Reportedly decommissioned. | |
| P413 | Series III | Colombo Dockyard Limited | | 2000-2004 | Sunk by Sea Tigers. No date. | |
| P414 | Series III | Colombo Dockyard Limited | | 2000-2004 | Reportedly decommissioned. | |
| P415 | Series III | Colombo Dockyard Limited | | 2000-2004 | Reportedly decommissioned. | |
| P416 | Series III | Colombo Dockyard Limited | | 2000-2004 | Sunk by Sea Tigers. No date. | |
| P417 | Series III | Colombo Dockyard Limited | | 2000-2004 | Reportedly decommissioned. | |
| P418 | Series III | Colombo Dockyard Limited | | 2000-2004 | Sunk in May 2006 by Sea Tigers. | |
| P419 | Series III | Colombo Dockyard Limited | | 2000-2004 | Reportedly decommissioned. | |
| P424 | Series III | Colombo Dockyard Limited | | 2000-2004 | Reportedly decommissioned. | |
| P430 | Series IV | Colombo Dockyard Limited | | 2005 | Reportedly decommissioned. | |
| P431 | Series IV | Colombo Dockyard Limited | | 2005 | Sunk by Sea Tigers. No date. | |
| P432 | Series IV | Colombo Dockyard Limited | | 2005 | Reportedly decommissioned. | |
| P433 | Series IV | Colombo Dockyard Limited | | 2005 | Reportedly decommissioned. | |
| P434 | Series IV | Colombo Dockyard Limited | | 2005 | Sunk in 2009 by Sea Tigers. | |
| P435 | Series IV | Colombo Dockyard Limited | | 2005 | Reportedly decommissioned. | |
| P436 | Series IV | Colombo Dockyard Limited | | 2005 | Reportedly decommissioned. | |
| P437 | Series IV | Colombo Dockyard Limited | | 2005 | Reportedly decommissioned. | |
| P438 | Series IV | Colombo Dockyard Limited | | 2005 | Sunk in March 2008 by Sea Tigers. | |
| P439 | Series IV | Colombo Dockyard Limited | | 2005 | Reportedly decommissioned. | |

=== MNDF Coast Guard ===
| Hull No. | Name | Builder | Laid down | Commissioned | Status | Reference/s |
|---|---|---|---|---|---|---|
| T701 | Nooradheen, formerly Ghazee | Colombo Dockyard Limited | 1997 | 20 January 1998 | Operational | |
| T702 | Iskandhar | Colombo Dockyard Limited | 1997 | 20 January 1998 | Operational | |

== Operators ==
- Maldives: MNDF Coast Guard – Coastal surveillance vessels.
- Sri Lanka: Sri Lanka Navy – Ultra Fast Attack Crafts. In 2016, the SLN reported have 22 UFACs in service.

== Bibliography ==
- Saunders, Stephen, ed. (2009). Jane's Fighting Ships 2009-2010. IHS Jane's. ISBN 978-0710628886.
- Saunders, Stephen, ed. (2015). Jane's Fighting Ships 2015-2016. IHS Jane's. ISBN 978-0710631435.
