= Ranavijaya-class landing craft =

Sri Lankan Naval landing craft

Class overview
- Name: Ranavijaya class
- Builders: Colombo Dockyard Limited
- Operators: Sri Lanka Navy
- Completed: 2
- Active: 2

General characteristics
- Type: Landing Craft Utility
- Displacement: (full load) 128 tons
- Length: 34 m (112 ft)
- Beam: 8 m (26 ft)
- Draft: 1.5 m (4 ft 11 in)
- Depth: 2 m (6 ft 7 in)
- Propulsion: Two diesels
- Speed: 10 knots (19 km/h)
- Range: 1,200 nmi (2,200 km)
- Troops: 268
- Crew: 28
- Armament: 4 14.5mm machine guns, 2 20mm machine guns and 2 12.7mm machine guns

The Ranavijaya-class landing craft is a landing craft utility developed by the Colombo Dockyard Limited for the Sri Lanka Navy. Two ships of this class have been built; the Ranagaja commissioned in 1991 and the Ranavijaya commissioned in 1994.

Based on this class a Fast Landing Craft was built by Colombo Dockyard for the Maldivian Coast Guard, the smaller craft was 28m in length and has an aluminum hull.

== Operators ==
- Sri Lanka Navy
