= Arnison =

Arnison is a surname. Notable people with the surname include:

- Billy Arnison (1924–1996), South African footballer
- Charles Arnison (1893–1974), British WWI flying ace
- John Arnison, British music manager and producer
- Paul Arnison (born 1977), British footballer
- Peter Arnison (born 1940), Australian politician
- [ John Arnison (born 1962)

British photographer

== See also ==
- Arneson
