= FV Pere Charles =

History
- Name: MFV Pere Charles DA 34
- Completed: 1982
- Fate: Sunk 10 January 2007

MFV Pere Charles DA 34 was a French-built Irish-flagged fishing trawler which sank on 10 January 2007 off the coast of Wexford with the loss of all hands on board.

Pere Charles was built in 1982, and at the time of her sinking, had a gross tonnage of 100 metric tons and an overall length of 20 meters. She was one of the largest and most modern fishing vessels operating from her port of Dunmore East, Waterford. Pere Charles was particularly suited for herring fishing, although she was capable of fishing for a variety of species.

In January 2006, Pere Charles was purchased by a fisherman operating out of Dunmore East, and was refurbished, entering the local fleet after passing a safety inspection.

== Sinking ==
On 10 January 2007 Pere Charles was conducting Pair Trawling with another vessel, Suzanna G While returning home in the midst of a storm, fighting heavy seas and with a full catch of herring, Pere Charles sank, with all five of her crew lost. Despite possessing modern safety and radio equipment, as well as ocean standard life-rafts, none of the five men were ever recovered. The final message from Pere Charles, sent by VHF to Suzanna G shortly after 6PM, was: "She has breached on me. Stand by." Susanna G replied "Yes, Ok". All contact with the vessel was then lost.

An investigation by Marine Casualty Investigation Board (MCIB) was conducted, which revealed that the vessel was much lower in the water than normal on the evening of the sinking, probably due to her herring load being larger than usual. This would have increased the likelihood of water swamping the vessel. However, the report also states that the vessel was not overloaded, and should have been able to make a safe return to port. According to the report, the most likely cause of the sinking was water rushing into Pere Charles's deck shelter. The vessel had only limited capability to clear water from this shelter, and after being flooded, the vessel likely heeled and sank.

Extensive modifications were done to the trawler between 2001 and 2006, and no assessment was made of the changes these refits had on the trawlers stability. Although no such assessment was legally required at the time, these modifications may have contributed to the sinking. The MCIB report recommended that modifications to fishing vessels be reviewed, as well as calling for improvements to safety within the fishing industry.

On 12 January 2007 the wreck of the trawler was located. Divers from the Irish Naval Service searched the vessel, but failed to recover any bodies. In November of the same year, Pere Charles was raised and brought to Arklow by barge. The vessel was again searched, but no bodies were found.
