= USS Cruise =

Admirable-class minesweeper

History
- Name: USS Cruise
- Builder: Tampa Shipbuilding Company
- Laid down: 7 December 1942
- Launched: 21 March 1943
- Commissioned: 21 September 1945
- Decommissioned: 5 September 1946
- Reclassified: MSF-215, 7 February 1955
- Stricken: 1 July 1972
- Identification: IMO number: 7613715
- Fate: Sold 1 March 1973, converted to a menhaden fisherman and renamed Gregory Poole; intentionally sunk off Delaware Bay on 10 December 2007.

General characteristics
- Class & type: Admirable-class minesweeper
- Displacement: 650 tons
- Length: 184 ft 6 in (56.24 m)
- Beam: 33 ft (10 m)
- Draft: 9 ft 9 in (2.97 m)
- Propulsion: 2 × ALCO 539 diesel engines, 1,710 shp (1.3 MW); Farrel-Birmingham single reduction gear; 2 shafts
- Speed: 14.8 knots (27.4 km/h)
- Complement: 104
- Armament: 1 × 3"/50 caliber gun DP; 2 × twin Bofors 40 mm guns; 1 × Hedgehog anti-submarine mortar; 2 × Depth charge tracks

USS Cruise (AM/MSF-215) was an Admirable-class minesweeper built for the U.S. Navy during World War II. She was built to clear minefields in offshore waters, and served the Navy in the Pacific Ocean.

She was launched 21 March 1943 by Tampa Shipbuilding Co., Inc., Tampa, Florida; completed by Charleston Navy Yard; and commissioned 21 September 1945, Lieutenant S. F. Luce, USNR, in command.

Cruise visited New York between 19 December 1945 and 5 January 1946, then sailed by way of Guantanamo Bay, Cuba; the Panama Canal Zone; and Salina Cruz, Mexico, for San Pedro, Los Angeles, arriving 3 February. Originally destined for Pearl Harbor, she was ordered back to the east coast, sailing 20 March and arriving at Galveston, Texas, 22 April. Sailing on to Philadelphia, Pennsylvania, Cruise was placed out of commission in reserve there on 5 September 1946. She was reclassified MSF-215 on 7 February 1955. On 1 July 1972 she was struck from the Navy List.

== MV Gregory Poole ==
On 1 March 1973, Cruise was purchased by Beaufort Fisheries, Inc., Beaufort, North Carolina, and converted to a menhaden fisherman and renamed Gregory Poole, official number 558835.

On 10 December 2007, the Gregory Poole was scuttled off the coast of Delaware onto the Del-Jersey-Land Inshore Reef site (38°30.9′N 74°30.6′W), to help form an artificial reef.
