= Great Offshore Limited =

Indian offshore oilfield service company

Great Offshore Limited (GOL Offshore) is an Indian offshore oilfield services company based in Mumbai. The company's operations date back to 1983, and it has been trading under its current name since 2006.

The company has come under criticism in 2016 for not paying the crews of two of its platform supply vessel ships: Malaviya Seven and Malaviya Twenty. The ships were detained in Aberdeen and Great Yarmouth respectively. These cases have been highlighted in the UK parliament.

The Maritime and Coastguard Agency has been working with the International Transport Workers' Federation (ITF) as the non-payment of the crew members contravenes both the Maritime Labour Convention and UK Modern Slavery Act 2015.

In September 2017 a court allowed the sale of the ship Malaviya Seven, and owner GOL Offshore was reported to be in liquidation.

In August 2018 Captain Rastogi and the last four crew of Malaviya Twenty won a high court case, helped by the Nautilus International union and the ITF, with the Admiralty marshal agreeing that the ship could be sold to pay the port and crew.

GOL Offshore Ltd. was a publicly traded company on BSE (Scrip Code: 532786), however from July 19, 2017, it is suspended from trading.
