= Seagull Express 2 =

The Seagull Express 2 was a ferry that caught fire after a short-circuit in its engine room in Malaysia on 13 October 2007 and subsequently sank in the South China Sea.

The ferry, which had been en route from Tioman Island to Mersing, did not meet regulations for carrying passengers and had been unlicensed for a year.

Of the 106 aboard, 99 were rescued and seven drowned.
