= SLNS Sayurala (P623) =

History

Sri Lanka
- Builder: Hindustan Shipyard Limited
- Launched: 1990
- Commissioned: 2009
- In service: 2008
- Out of service: 2011
- Home port: SLN Dockyard, Trincomalee
- Identification: IMO number: 8713938
- Status: Active

General characteristics
- Class & type: Vikram class
- Displacement: 1,220 tons
- Length: 74.1 metres
- Beam: 11.4 metres
- Draught: 3.2 metres
- Propulsion: 2 × diesel engines, 6200 hp sustained, 2 shafts and cp props.
- Speed: 22 knots (41 km/h; 25 mph)
- Range: 8,500 nautical miles (15,700 km; 9,800 mi) at 16 knots (30 km/h; 18 mph)
- Complement: 11 officers, 89 enlisted
- Sensors & processing systems: Two Decca 1226 - I band
- Armament: 1 30mm automatic 2A4Z cannon in place of the Bofors 40mm/60 gun. 2x 7.62mm machine guns, additional weapon systems added
- Aircraft carried: 1 HAL Chetak

SLNS Sayurala (P623) (Sayurala meaning: Sea waves) was an offshore patrol vessel (OPV) of the Sri Lanka Navy. It was named as the CGS Vigraha (39), a Vikram-class offshore patrol craft of the Indian Coast Guard. She was in service in Sri Lanka from 2009 during the Sri Lankan Civil War, before being returned to India in 2011.

In 2017, the Sri Lanka Navy named its new Saryu-class advanced offshore patrol vessel as SLNS Sayurala.

== Operations ==
Sayurala was tasked with deep sea patrolling both within the Sri Lankan territorial waters and in international waters to curb possible arms smuggling during the Sri Lankan Civil War. She was returned to the Indian Coast Guard in 2008.

== CGS Vigraha ==
Commissioned on 12 April 1990, CGS Vigraha (39) served with the Indian Coast Guard until she was transferred to the Sri Lanka Navy.
