= Arneson =

Arneson (also spelled Arnesson) is a surname of Norwegian origin. Notable people with the surname include:

- Dave Arneson (1947–2009), American game designer
- Erni Arneson (1917–2006), Danish film actress
- Finn Arnesson (died c. 1065), Norwegian nobleman and adviser to Olaf Haraldsson
- Jim Arneson (born 1951), American football player
- Lars Arnesson (1936–2023), coach of the Swedish national football team
- Mark Arneson (1949–2023), American football player
- Nicholas Arnesson (1150–1225), Norwegian bishop and nobleman during the Norwegian civil war era
- Richard Arneson, political philosopher
- Robert Arneson (1930–1992), American sculptor

== See also ==
- Arneson River Theater, an outdoor theater in San Antonio, Texas
- Arnison
