= Battle of Delft =

- Part of the Sri Lankan Civil War
Date	December 25, 2007
Location	off Delft, Sri Lanka
Result	Disputed

Belligerents
Sri Lanka	Liberation Tigers of Tamil Eelam

Units involved
Sri Lanka Armed Forces; Sri Lanka Navy; Sri Lanka Air Force (Close air support)	Liberation Tigers of Tamil Eelam; Sea Tigers

Strength
12 fast attack craft, helicopter gunships and Kfir fighter jets	Unknown

Casualties and losses
Government Claims 12 dead one boat damaged, rebels claim one sunk one damaged	Government Claims 6 boats sunk and 40 dead, rebels claim 4 dead

The Battle of Delft was a naval battle on December 25, 2007 and part of the Sri Lankan Civil War. The Sri Lankan Navy claimed that it received reports of a boat cluster moving off of Delft Island. After moving in to investigate clashes erupted and fierce sea battle ensued. Both sides claimed victory. The pro-rebel Tamilnet claimed that the Sea Tigers sank one Sri Lankan Navy vessel and the Sri Lankan Navy suffered 10 casualties. However, the Sri Lankan Defense ministry claimed that six Tiger boats were sunk and over 40 Tigers were killed.
