= SLNS Samudura =

Sri Lanka Navy Reliance-class cutter

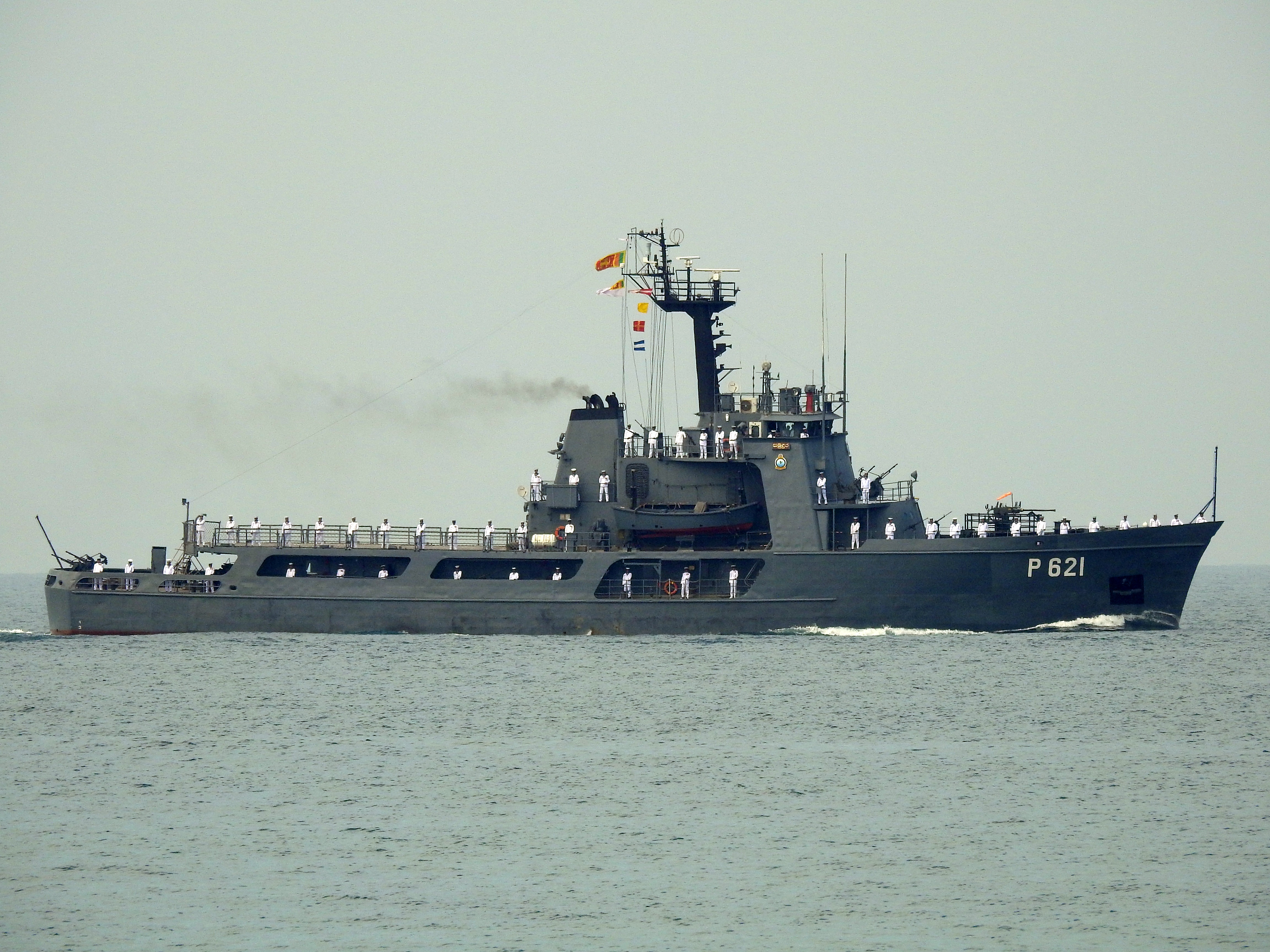
- SLNS Samudura in 2019

History

United States
- Name: USCGC Courageous (WMEC-622)
- Builder: American Ship Building Company, Lorain, Ohio
- Laid down: 14 March 1966
- Launched: 18 March 1967
- Commissioned: 19 April 1968
- Decommissioned: 19 September 2001
- Stricken: June 24, 2004
- Honors and awards: Coast Guard Unit Commendation
- Fate: Struck, for delivery to Sri Lanka

Sri lanka
- Name: SLNS Samudura (P621)
- Commissioned: 2005
- Home port: SLN Dockyard, Trincomalee
- Status: In active service

General characteristics
- Displacement: 1,145 tons (full load)
- Length: 210 ft 6 in (64.16 m)
- Beam: 34 ft (10 m)
- Draught: 10 ft 6 in (3.20 m) max
- Propulsion: 2 × V16 2550 horsepower ALCO diesel engines
- Speed: max 18 knots; 2,700 mile range
- Range: cruise 14 knots; 6,100 mile range
- Complement: 12 officers, 63 enlisted
- Sensors & processing systems: 2 × AN/SPS-64
- Armament: 1 × Bofors 40 mm gun; 2 × ZPU-2 14.5 mm guns; Multiple × M2HB .50 caliber machine gun
- Aircraft carried: HH-65 Dolphin

SLNS Samudura (P621) (Sinhala: සමුදුර, romanized: Samudura, lit. 'Sea') is a Sri Lanka Navy Offshore Patrol Vessel. Originally commissioned by the United States Coast Guard in 1968 as the medium endurance cutter USCGC Courageous, she was donated to Sri Lanka in 2004 and commissioned on 19 February 2005.

== United States Coast Guard ==
=== Initial deployment ===
The Courageous was built at the American Shipyards in Lorain, Ohio by the American Ship Building Company and launched on 18 March 1967. She was delivered to the Coast Guard and commissioned on 19 April 1968. She was initially homeported in San Juan, Puerto Rico, and served there through 1972, conducting search and rescue and law enforcement patrols. On 10 September 1968, she towed the disabled sailboat Ibex 20 miles north of Bimini to Miami. On 6 October 1968 she medevaced a boy suffering from the bends from the F/V M.M. Winter off the coast of Florida. On 21 April 1969, crewmen boarded the German M/V Helga Witt following a request by the ship's commanding officer concerning armed men on board. The Courageous then escorted the German merchantman to San Juan.

On 29 and 30 April 1969, she assumed duty of on-scene commander, following a fire on the British tanker Mobile Apex, taking the blazing tanker in tow and took her out of Saint Croix, U.S. Virgin Islands. The cutter and crew were awarded the Coast Guard Unit Commendation "for exceptionally meritorious service during the period 29 April to 2 May 1969" for this action. From 11 to 28 July, Courageous participated in BOMAX (Barbados Oceanographic and Meteorological Experiment), hosting Coast Guard cadets and scientists. The crew assisted scientists with assembling and launching devices for measuring ocean currents and temperatures. An article on this assignment was published in the August 1969 issue of Popular Science. On 7 August 1969, stood by the M/V Pionyr following its grounding until a commercial tug arrived on scene. On the 30th, Courageous assisted in a medevac from a sailboat 320 miles north of San Juan, Puerto Rico. On 12 October 1970 the cutter once again assisted in a medevac and then towed the F/V Janice Elaine to Miami. On 1 August 1971 Courageous seized the yacht White Cloud near Cuban waters and arrested two for aiding draft evaders.

On 23 December 1971 RCC Miami notified Courageous to undertake a rescue of the 26-foot S/V Ian's Cradle with 4 persons on board, during a severe gale, east of Fort Pierce. The sailing vessel and her crew had attempted to sail to Bimini in other than optimum weather conditions. By the time the request for assistance was broadcast, Ian's Cradle had been dismasted and had lost one person overboard and the remaining three, including an infant, were in mortal danger. The Courageous got underway and located the sailing vessel and after much trouble managed to secure a towline. Due to the worsening of the sea conditions, a helo was requested out of St. Petersburg, and the three survivors on Ian's Cradle were lifted off their vessel to safety. The Ian's Cradle sank ten minutes later. During this rescue, Courageous lost all of her helicopter nets, her long antenna, and sustained other damage.**

=== The 'Drug War' ===
She changed homeports in late 1971 to Cape Canaveral. Courageous sustained a casualty when an elevator in the galley collapsed and killed SS3 Dean Renolds in 1973. On 21 December 1977, Courageous seized the vessel Isla de Aruba carry illegal drugs, marking the beginning of her duties on the "front lines of the drug war." On 18 March 1982, she seized the Cayman Island-flagged Damocles carrying 28 tons of marijuana. She changed homeports once again in 1982 to Key West. On 25 January 1984, she seized a work boat with 20 tons of marijuana on board. On 17 March 1984, Courageous seized another work boat with 20 tons of marijuana on board northwest of Providence Channel.

On 20 March 1984, a boarding team seized the F/V Griffon 75 miles east of Great Abaco Island carrying 30 pounds of marijuana. On 6 May 1984, her boarding team seized the M/V Canta Dora, 14 mile north of New Providence Island, carrying 10 tons of marijuana. On 25 June 1984, they seized M/V Henry I 100 miles north of Yucatán Channel, carrying 8.5 tons of marijuana. Courageous seized a small fishing vessel with 5 tons of marijuana on board near Rum Cay, and on 18 August 1984, they seized P/C Mayo with 5 tons of marijuana on board near Rum Cay. On the same day, they seized the P/C Miriam C 65 miles northeast of Nassau, carrying 15 tons of marijuana. On 24 August 1984, her crew took a break from law enforcement, and rescued 10 from the M/V Rio Teta, which the crew had scuttled to avoid being searched. On 14 January 1985, they seized the F/V Black Stallion, 330 miles northwest of Puerto Rico, carrying 10 tons of marijuana.

=== Refit ===
In March 1987, she was decommissioned and entered Colonna's Shipyard in Norfolk, Virginia for her Major Maintenance Availability process (MMA). She received the following modifications and upgrades: improved habitability, improved stability by rearranging tank locations, replacement of all asbestos paneling, increased the berthing space, upgraded the flight deck and helicopter equipment, increased the amount of helicopter fuel carried, improved the evaporator, increased and upgraded the communications and electronics capacities, installed vertical exhaust stacks and associated ballast, and installed a smoke detection system and new fire-fighting equipment. Courageous was returned to the Coast Guard on 5 March 1990 in Portsmouth, Virginia. The cutter was then placed in commission "special status." Following an extensive onload of needed supplies, the crew completed a five-month engine overhaul in Portsmouth. During subsequent engine trials, a shaft alignment problem was discovered by the crew. A five-month drydocking at the Coast Guard Yard for shaft repairs was required. In addition to shaft repairs, a new steering motor was installed, both anchors were replaced, and a new computer system was installed in the cutter's combat information center. Having completed the repairs to the shaft alignment and undergoing extensive crew training and ready for sea preparations, Courageous arrived at her new homeport of Panama City, Florida, on 3 February 1991. She was formally recommissioned on 16 March 1991.

=== Migrant interdiction ===
Courageous once again began performing her routine maritime law enforcement, search and rescue, and defense readiness patrols in the Gulf of Mexico and Caribbean Sea. One of her commanding officers described her duties as follows:

Courageous is a 210-foot Medium Endurance cutter with a crew of 63 enlisted, 12 officers, and a four-person aviation detachment when we have a helicopter embarked. Our patrol schedule generally takes us on six-week patrols throughout the Caribbean and Florida Straits with port calls in places like San Juan, St. Thomas, Jamaica, Grand Cayman, Key West, and the Dominican Republic to name a few. Patrols are usually followed by a six-week maintenance period in homeport. Our primary missions are law enforcement, migrant interdiction, and search and rescue.

On 8 September 2001, a Good Samaritan located a raft 25 miles south of Alligator Key, FL. USCGC Chincoteague (WPB-1320) arrived on scene and embarked nine Cuban migrants. The raft was destroyed as a hazard to navigation. The migrants were transferred to Courageous where Immigration and Naturalization Service (INS) interviews were conducted. On 12 September, the nine migrants were transferred to the cutter Nantucket and returned to Cuba. On 3 September, Coast Guard Station Marathon intercepted nine Cuban migrants, 10 miles south of Sombrero Key Light. All nine migrants were transferred to cutter Padre for further transfer to cutter Courageous for INS interviews. On 9 September, the nine migrants were returned to Cuba by cutter Key Largo. On 3 September, a good Samaritan spotted two Cuban migrants on a raft, 30 miles south of Key West, FL. Cutter Padre embarked the migrants for further transfer to cutter Courageous for INS interviews. On 9 September, the two Cuban migrants were returned to Cuba by cutter Key Largo.

Additionally, on 3 September, cutter Courageous intercepted two Cuban migrants on a raft, 40 miles south of Marathon, Florida. Cutter Courageous embarked the migrants where INS interviews were conducted. One of the migrants was returned to Cuba on 9 September, the remaining migrant was transferred to cutter Nantucket and returned to Cuba on 12 September. On 3 September, an Air Station Miami HU-25 aircraft spotted a 25-foot vessel with approximately 28 Cuban migrants on board. Cutter Courageous intercepted the raft, 39 miles southeast of Marathon, FL. All 28 Cuban migrants were taken aboard cutter Courageous where INS interviews were conducted. The raft was destroyed as a hazard to navigation. On 9 September cutter Key Largo returned all 28 migrants to Cuba.

On 5 September, cutter Courageous located a raft with six Cuban migrants, 10 miles north of Cay Sal Bank, Bahamas. On 7 September, the migrants were transferred to cutter Manitou and later transferred to Bahamian authorities in Freeport, Bahamas. On 5 September, cutter Courageous intercepted 19 Cuban migrants on a go-fast 11 miles north of Cay Sal Bank, Bahamas. Two of the migrants are suspected to be smugglers and were turned over to the U.S. Border Patrol. INS interviews were conducted on cutter Courageous. On 12 September, the migrants were transferred to cutter Nantucket and returned to Cuba.

As of October 2001, a memo from the cutter noted that:

During a recent 45-day deployment, Courageous patrolled the waters between Key West and Cuba, and was primarily involved with the interdiction and repatriation of Cuban migrants in the Straits of Florida. Courageous intercepted 58 Cuban migrants on the high seas, and was responsible for the care and feeding of 94 additional migrants from other Coast Guard units. Courageous also rescued 3 Cubans who were stranded on Cay Sal Island, a small, deserted island 110 miles south of Miami.

Courageous experienced her most challenging migrant mission on September 5, when she stopped a 30-ft speedboat 50 miles south of the Florida Keys, with the assistance of a Coast Guard HH-60 Jayhawk helicopter. The Courageous boarding team discovered that the "go-fast" was smuggling migrants from Cuba to South Florida, and had 17 migrants secreted into a small locker in the bow of the speedboat. Most of the Cubans were unconscious and near death from dehydration, and the crew of the Courageous quickly recovered all seventeen onboard where the ship's medical technicians quickly stabilized the most critical migrants. After subsequent INS interviews, the migrants were repatriated to Cuba one week later.

In addition to the migrant interdiction missions, Courageous was also the on-scene commander during the Coast Guard's search and rescue mission for a downed Cuban aircraft on September 19 and 20. The nine survivors, including three children, were rescued by the passing 580-foot Panamanian freighter Chios Dream. Courageous embarked a medical technician on the merchant vessel in heavy seas to perform emergency medical care; after the evacuation of the most critical survivor by helicopter, the remaining survivors were transferred ashore for medical treatment in Key West. The final two weeks of the deployment were spent at Naval Station, Mayport where the crew underwent an intense period of classroom training and practical underway exercises to hone their navigation, damage control, first aid, and seamanship skills.

She was decommissioned on 19 September 2001.

== Sri Lanka Navy ==
The United States Coast Guard donated Courageous to Sri Lanka on 24 June 2004 and a departure ceremony was held 19 February 2005. She is currently serving the Sri Lankan Navy as P621 SLNS Samudura. The name means "sea" in Sinhalese.

=== Operations ===
Samudura was tasked with deep sea patrolling both within the Sri Lankan territorial waters and in international waters to curb arms smuggling by the LTTE. Samudura, along with other Offshore Patrol Vessels (OPVs) of the Sri Lankan Navy, was able to successfully intercept several ships smuggling arms for the LTTE. In all these cases the ships were sunk when they attacked the naval vessels with mortars. Samudura also participated in the Cadex 2009 military training exercises with the Indian Navy after the war.

Samudura, in her post-conflict operations, continues to serve the nation with policing and law enforcement duties in the maritime jurisdiction of the country. Apart from her traditional role the ship successfully completed a scientific study programme in liaison with the Geological Survey and Mines Bureau of Sri Lanka in conjunction with the Woods Hole Oceanographic Institution of the USA. The ship celebrated her 7th anniversary in Trincomalee on 21 April 2012 with the participation of families of all her serving crew. The ship performed a major role in protecting the Sri Lankan waters from poaching in the northern waters by enforcing a strict vigil on the preservation of the marine environment and supporting sustainable fish-harvesting. At present the ship is attached to the Southern Naval Area to secure maritime interests in the Sri Lankan maritime jurisdiction. Her primary duties are to ensure the main Sea Lane of Communication (SLOC) that runs through the Sri Lankan maritime jurisdiction is safe for seafaring and policing the EEZ. The ship has intercepted several boat loads of illegal immigrants heading to Australia in violation of the country's immigration and emigration laws. In May 2020, it was deployed in the eastern Indian Ocean for search and rescue operations, following the tropical cyclone Amfan.

On 27 April 2025, Samudura departed from the Port of Colombo, Sri Lanka, bound for Changi, Singapore, to participate in the International Maritime Defence Exhibition (IMDEX) Asia 2025, which is scheduled to take place from 5 to 8 May 2025. The 9th International Maritime Security Conference (IMSC) will also take place alongside the exhibition.

==== Commanders ====
The commanding officer of the USCGC Courageous in 1991 was Capt. Bohner. The following commanding officer was LTJG Santimanzano. The first Sri Lankan captain of the vessel was Captain Sirimevan Ranasinghe WWV RWP.

Subsequently, the ship has been commanded by:

- Captain Dimuthu Gunawardena RWP, psc
- Captain Jayantha De Silva RSP, USP, psc
- Captain Kapila Samaraweera RSP, USP
- Captain Muditha Gamage USP, psc
- Captain Y.N. Jayarathna RWP, RSP, USP, psc

== Gallery ==
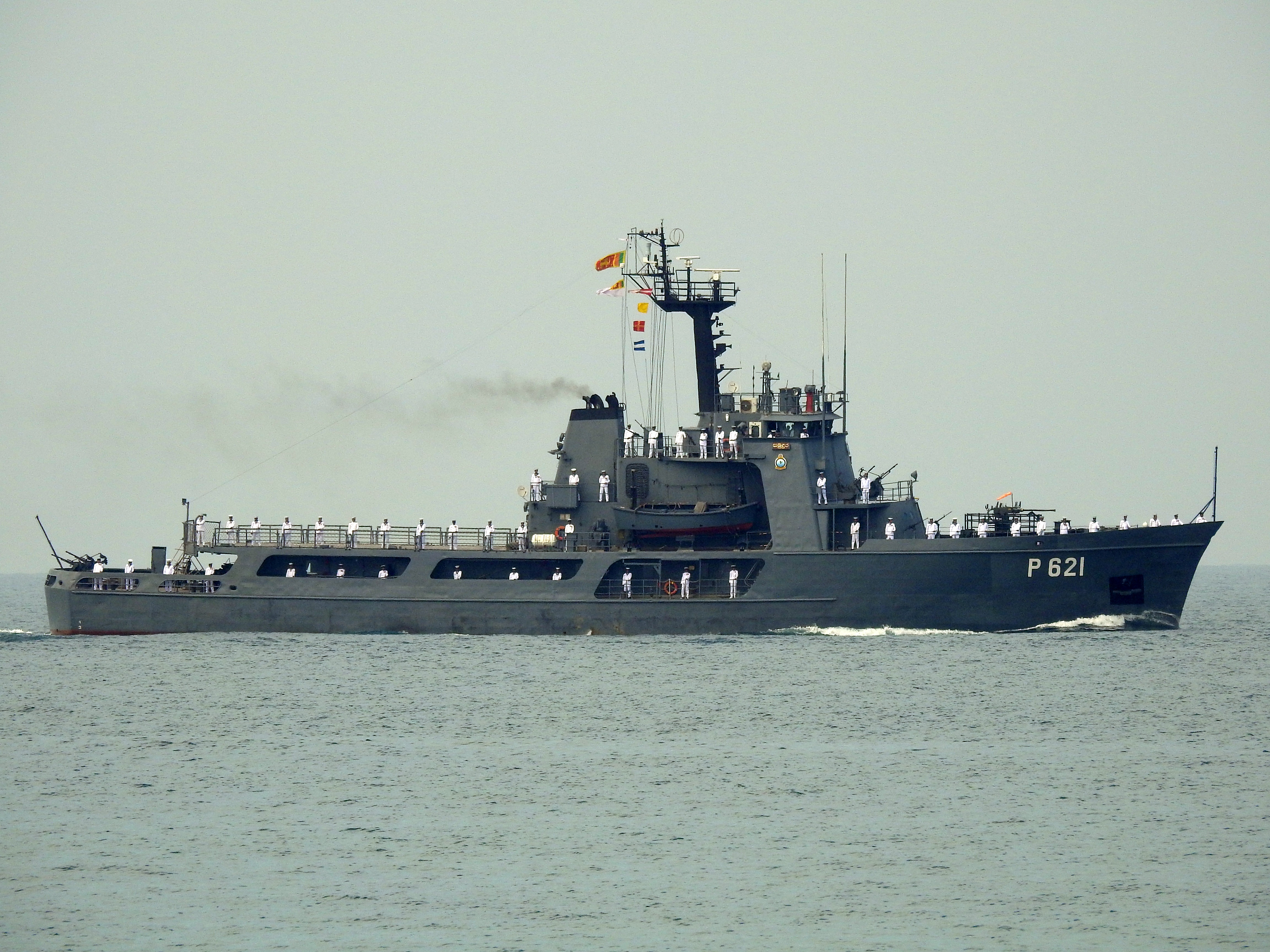
SLNS Samudura near Colombo Harbour in 2019.

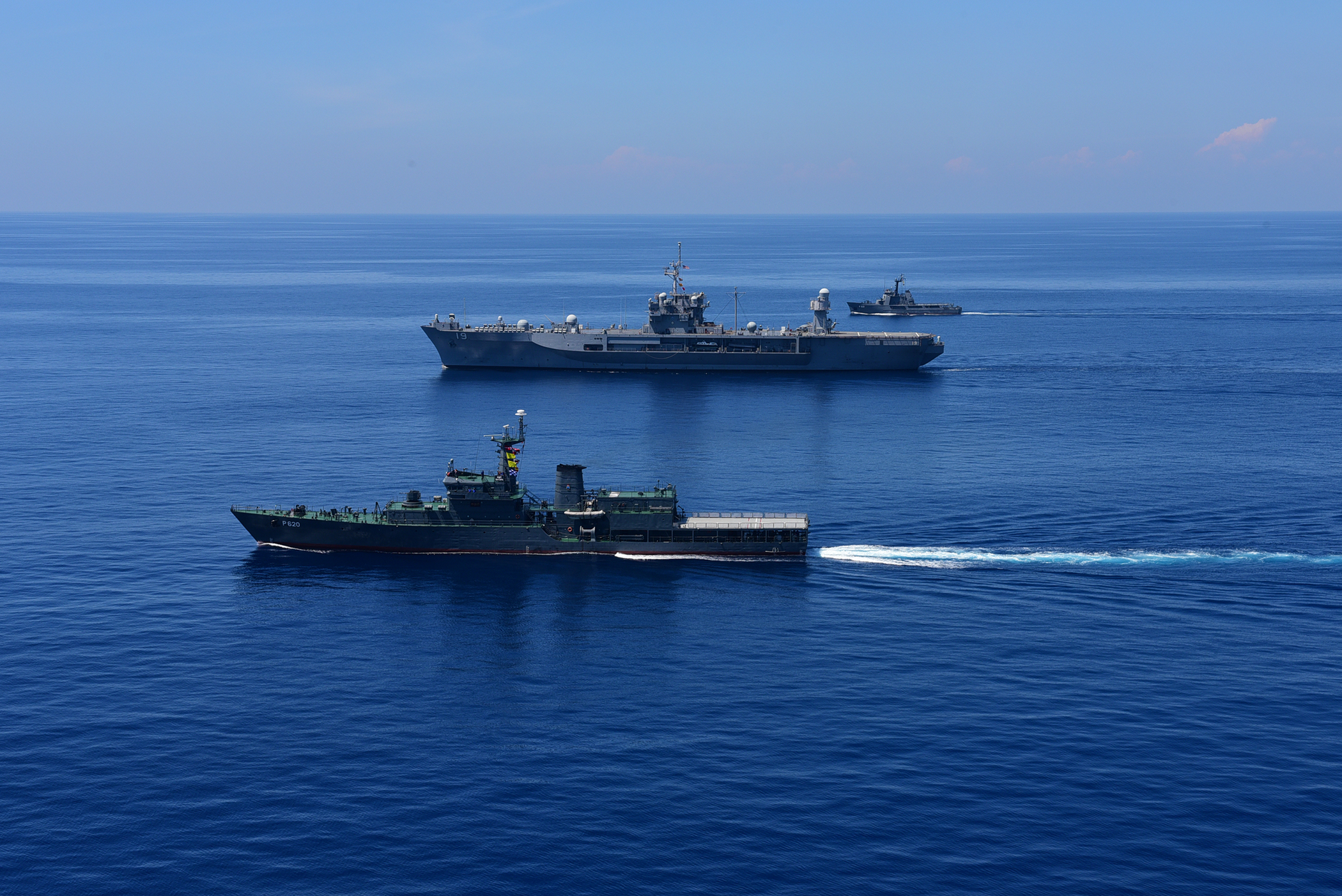
USS Blue Ridge (LCC-19) and Sri Lankan Navy SLNS Sayura and SLNS Samudura ships operate together

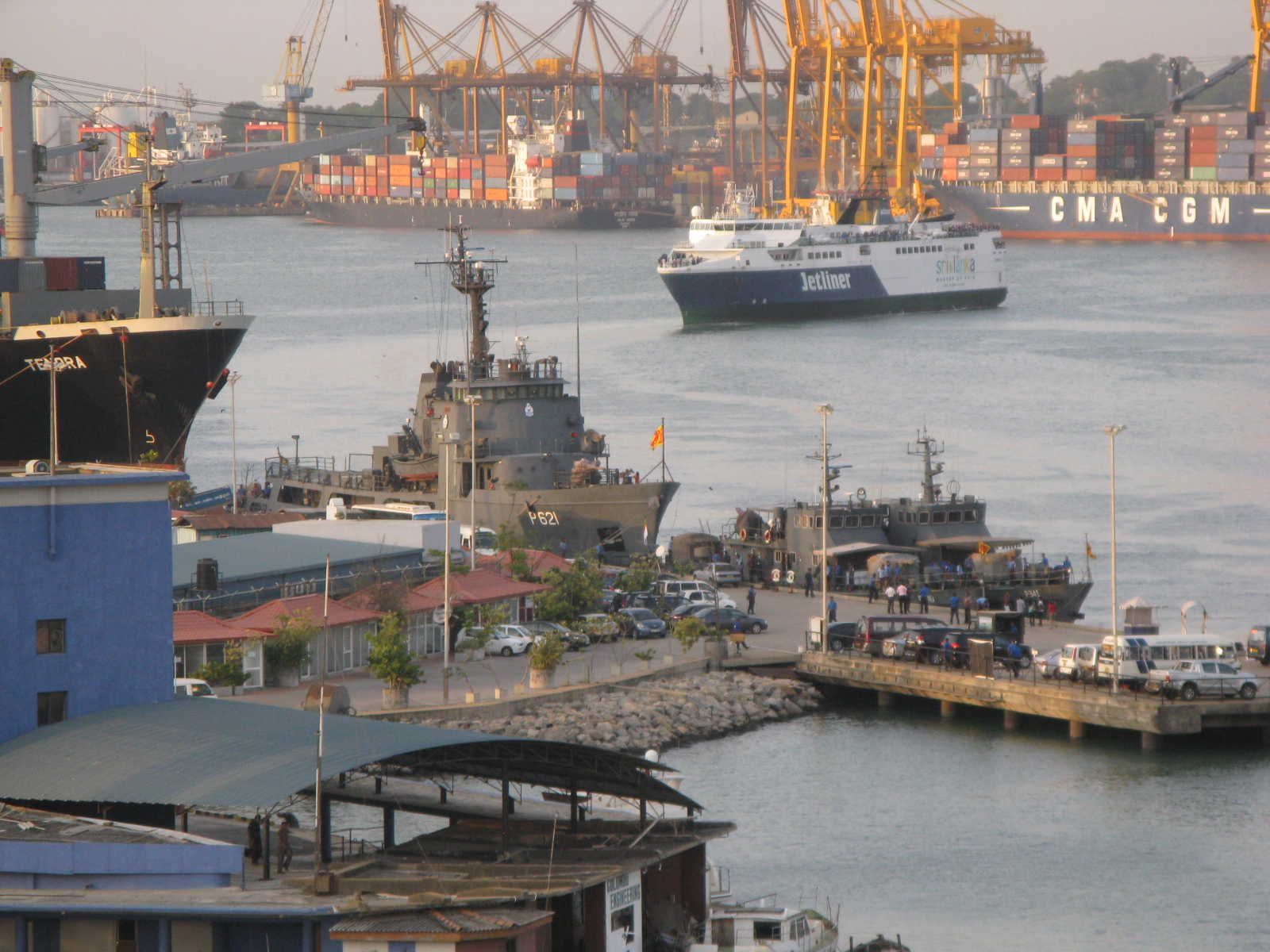
SLNS Samudura along with SLNS Prathapa (P340), SLNS Udara (P341) and SLNS Jetliner (A542) at Colombo Port

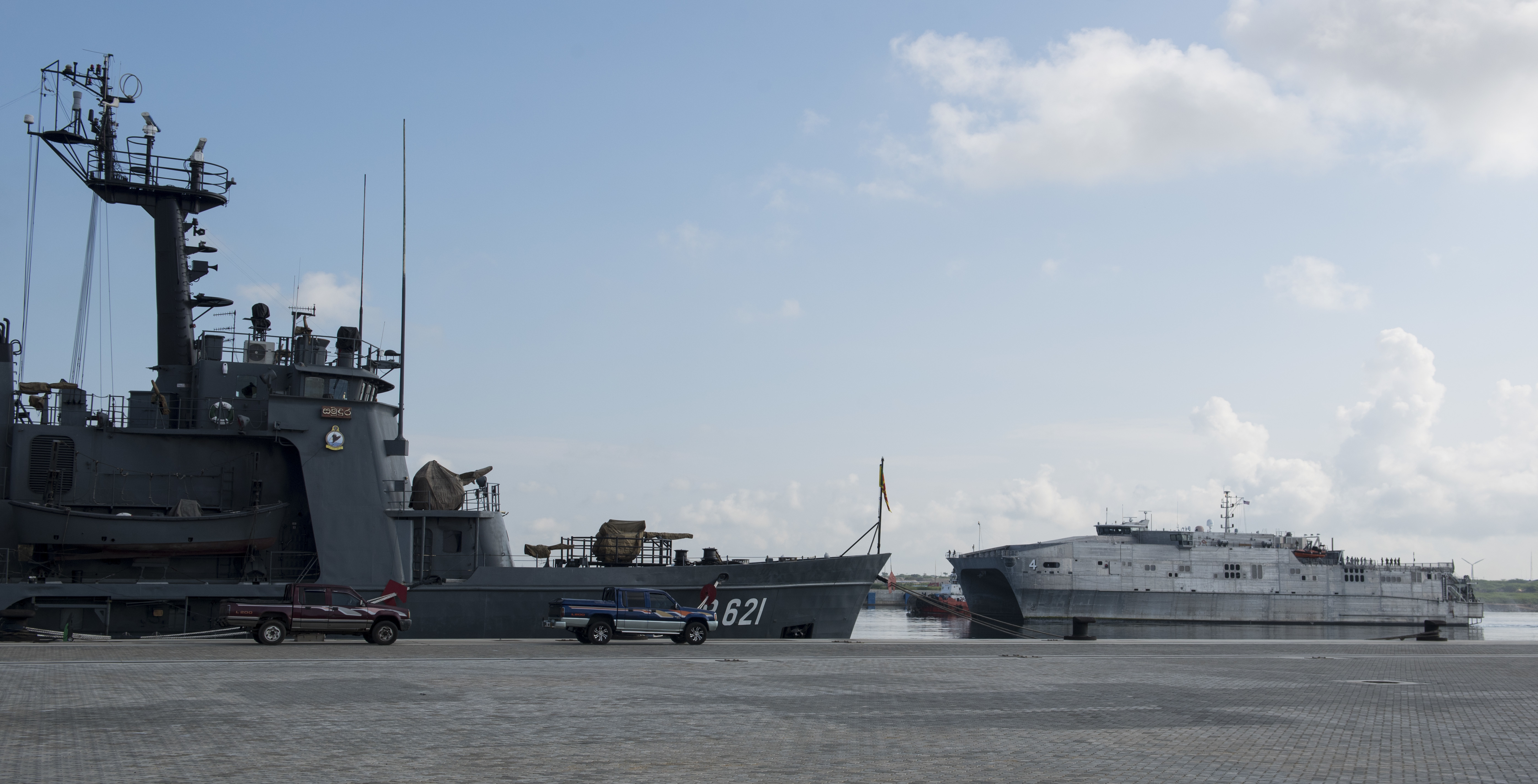
SLNS Samudura and USNS Fall River (T-EPF-4) at Hambanthota Port in 2017
