= Jayasagara-class patrol craft =

Class overview
- Name: Jayasagara
- Builders: Colombo Dockyard
- Completed: Two

General characteristics
- Type: Offshore patrol vessel
- Displacement: 330 tons full load
- Length: 39.8 metres
- Beam: 7 metres
- Draught: 2.2 meters
- Propulsion: 2 × diesel engines, 2 shafts, 2,040 bhp
- Speed: 15 knots
- Complement: 52
- Sensors & processing systems: civil navigation radar and day/night Optics.
- Armament: 1 dual 25mm, 2 dual 14.5mm, 1 40mm L/70? and additional armaments.
- Aircraft carried: none
- Aviation facilities: none

The Jayasagara class was a class of Offshore patrol vessels that were part of the Sri Lankan Navy built by the Colombo Dockyard.

== History ==
Built by Colombo Dockyard Limited for the Sri Lankan Navy in the early 1980s, these were the first warships built in Sri Lanka in modern times. Designed for off shore patrol and naval fire support on coastal areas they have seen action with the Sri Lankan Navy for more than 20 years.

Two ships of this class were built. They were used during the Sri Lankan Civil War and the SLNS Sagarawardena was lost due to a suicide attack carried out by the LTTE. Mostly used for patrol duties, the class have been deployed on many occasions to support amphibious operations carried out by the navy along with the Sri Lanka Army.

On October 2, 2021, the SLNS Jayesagara was decommissioned.

== Ships ==
Name	Builder	Launched	Commissioned	Status
SLNS Jayesagara (P601)	Colombo	1983	1983	Decommissioned
SLNS Sagarawardena (P602)	Colombo	1983	1983	Sunk
