= SLNS Jayasagara =

Sri Lankan Offshore Patrol Vessel

History

Sri Lanka
- Builder: Colombo Dockyard Limited
- Launched: 1983
- Commissioned: 1983
- Decommissioned: 30 September 2021
- Status: will be handed over to Sri Lanka coast guard

General characteristics
- Type: Offshore patrol vessel
- Displacement: 330 tons full load
- Length: 39.8 metres
- Beam: 7 metres
- Draught: 2.2 meters
- Propulsion: 2 × diesel engines, 2 shafts, 2,040 bhp
- Speed: 15 knots (28 km/h; 17 mph)
- Complement: 52
- Sensors & processing systems: civil navigation radar and day/night Optics.
- Armament: 1 dual 25mm, 2 dual 14.5mm, 1 40mm L/70 and additional armaments.
- Aircraft carried: none
- Aviation facilities: none

SLNS Jayasagara (P-601) (Jayasagara, in Sinhalese: Sea of victory) is an Offshore Patrol Vessel (OPV) of the Sri Lanka Navy. It was the lead ship of the locally built Jayasagara class. She served as the flagship of the fleet in the 1980s and 1990s.

== Operations ==
Since joining the Sri Lankan fleet in 1983, she served as its flagship and was deployed for patrolling the coastal water around Sri Lanka. Due to this she was attached to the 7th Surveillance Command Squadron. During the Sri Lankan Civil War, Jayesagara was involved in anti-arms smuggling patrols and maritime surveillance. In 2004 she took part in a joint naval exercise with the Indian Coast Guard. Since the end of the civil war she has engaged in search and rescue missions in the Indian Ocean.

In October 2021, SLNS Jayasagara relinquishes her service in the Navy and handed over to the Sri Lanka Coast Guard
