= SLNS Sagara =

Sri Lanka Navy Vikram-class offshore patrol vessel

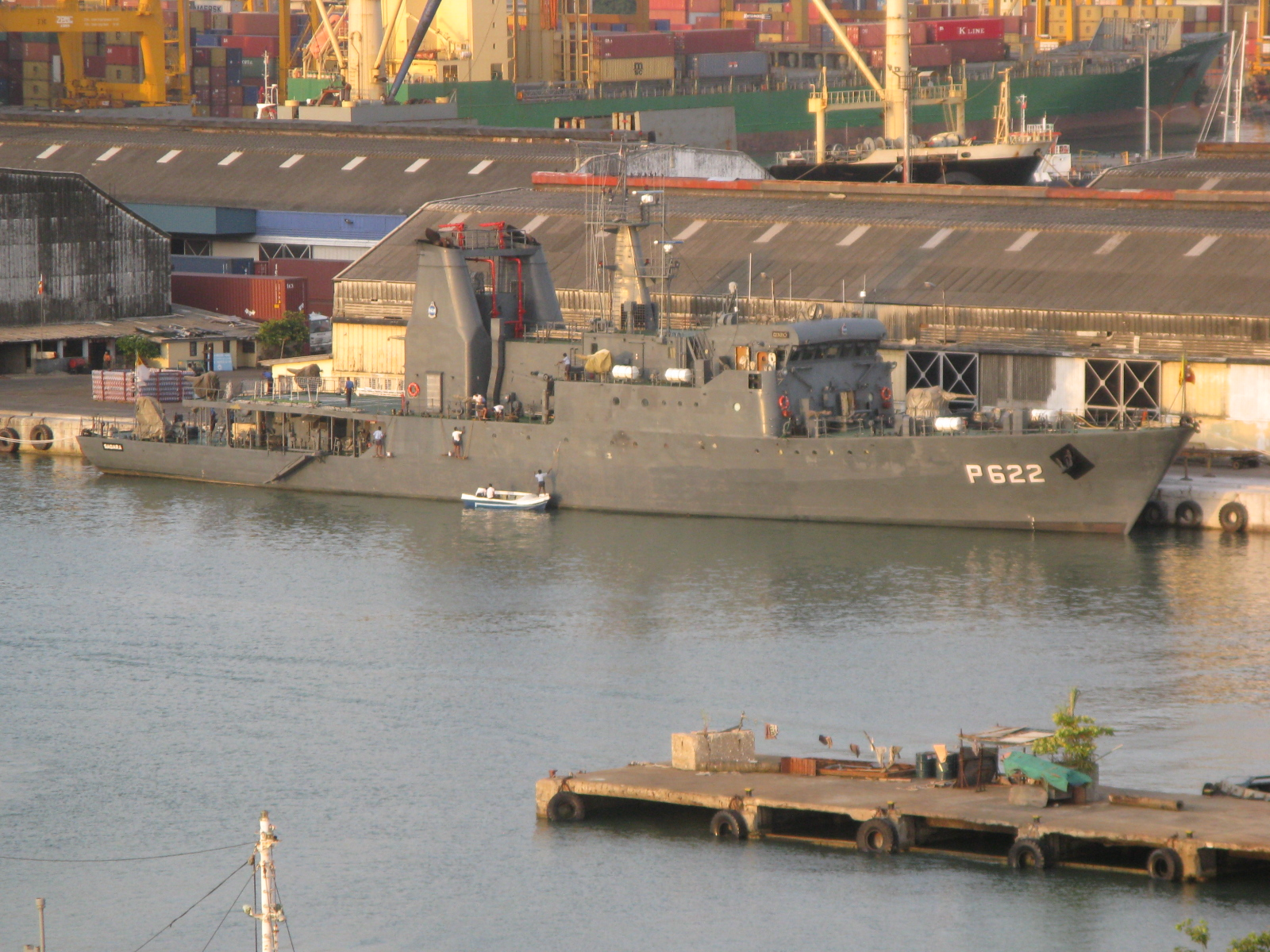
- SLNS Sagara

History

Sri Lanka
- Name: SLNS Sagara
- Operator: Sri Lankan Navy
- Builder: Hindustan Shipyard Limited
- Acquired: 2006
- Commissioned: 2006
- Home port: SLN Dockyard, Trincomalee
- Status: Active

History

India
- Name: ICGS Varaha
- Operator: Indian Coast Guard
- Builder: Goa Shipyard Limited
- Launched: 1992
- Commissioned: 1992
- Decommissioned: 2006
- Home port: Chennai
- Status: Transferred to Sri Lankan Navy

General characteristics
- Class & type: Vikram class
- Displacement: 1,220 long tons (1,240 t)
- Length: 74.1 m (243 ft 1 in)
- Beam: 11.4 m (37 ft 5 in)
- Draught: 3.2 m (10 ft 6 in)
- Propulsion: 2 × diesel engines, 6,200 hp (4.6 MW) sustained, 2 shafts and cp props.
- Speed: 22 kn (41 km/h)
- Range: cruise 16 kn (30 km/h)
- Endurance: 8,500 nmi (15,700 km)
- Complement: 11 officers, 89 enlisted
- Sensors & processing systems: Two Decca 1226 - I band
- Armament: 1x 30 mm automatic CRN 91 Naval Gun in place of the Bofors 40 mm/60 gun; 2x Type 58 14.5mm machine guns, multiple Type 80 machine guns, additional weapon systems added
- Aircraft carried: Not operationally deployed
- Aviation facilities: helicopter deck and enclosed hangar

SLNS Sagara (Sinhala: සාගර, romanized: Sāgara, lit. 'Oceans') is an Offshore Patrol Vessel (OPV) of the Sri Lanka Navy. It was formerly the ICGS Varaha (41), a Vikram class Offshore patrol vessel of the Indian Coast Guard, leased to Sri Lanka in 2006 and was handed over to the Sri Lanka Navy in 2015.

== History ==
Commissioned on 11 March 1992, CGS Varaha (41) served with the Indian Coast Guard until she was leased to Sri Lanka in 2006. In August 2015 Sri Lanka acquired the ship for permanent use.

== Operations ==
Since 2006, SLNS Sagara was tasked with deep sea patrolling both within the Sri Lankan territorial waters and in international waters to curb ongoing arms smuggling by the LTTE during the Sri Lankan Civil War. In the later stages of the war after undergoing a major refit in India, Sagara, along with other OPVs of the Sri Lankan Navy, has been able to successfully intercept several ships smuggling arms for the LTTE. In all these cases the ships were sunk when they attacked the naval vessels with mortars.

Sagara, along with SLNS Nandhimitra, a Sa'ar 4-class fast attack craft participated at the International Fleet Review 2026 held at Visakapatanam, India on 18 February 2026 and Exercise MILAN held between 19–21 February. The ships departed Sri Lanka on 11 February and reached Visakhapatnam on 16 February.
