= List of active ships of the Sri Lanka Navy =

This is a list of active ships of the Sri Lanka Navy, the naval warfare branch of the Sri Lanka Armed Forces.

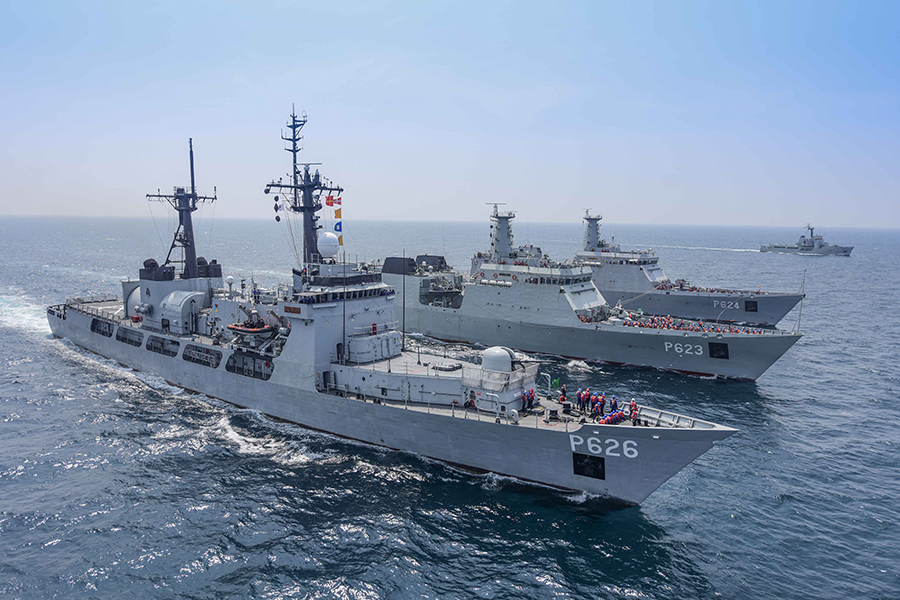
SLNS Gajabahu, SLNS Sayurala, SLNS Sindurala and SLNS Samudura of the Sri Lanka Navy

== Surface fleet ==
=== Advanced Offshore Patrol Vessels (AOPV) ===
Class	In service	Origin	Picture	Builder	Boats	Comm.	Disp. (t)	Notes
Hamilton class	2	(United States)		Avondale Shipyard	SLNS Gajabahu (P626)	2019	3,250	ex-USCGC Sherman
Hamilton class	2	(United States)		Avondale Shipyard	SLNS Vijayabahu (P627)	2022	3,250	ex-USCGC Douglas Munro
Saryu class	2	(India)		Goa Shipyard	SLNS Sayurala (P623)	2017	2,230	
Saryu class	2	(India)		Goa Shipyard	SLNS Sindurala (P624)	2018	2,230	
Type 053H2G	1	(China)		Hudong–Zhonghua Shipbuilding	SLNS Parakramabahu (P625)	2019	2,393	ex-CNS Tongling; entire gun armament had been retained.

=== Offshore Patrol Vessels (OPV) ===
Class	In service	Origin	Picture	Builder	Boats	Comm.	Disp. (t)	Notes
Reliance class	2	(United States)		American Ship Building Company	SLNS Samudura (P621)	2004	1,145	ex-USCGC Courageous
Reliance class	2	(United States)		Coast Guard Yard	SLNS Samudravijaya (P628)	2026	1,145	ex-USCGC Decisive
Sukanya class	1	(India)		Hindustan Shipyard	SLNS Sayura (P620)	2000	1,890	ex-INS Sarayu; upgraded to light frigate standard.
Vikram class	1	(India)		Goa Shipyard	SLNS Sagara (P622)	2006	1,180	ex-ICGS Varaha

=== Fast Missile Vessels ===
Class	In service	Origin	Picture	Builder	Boats	Comm.	Disp. (t)	Notes
Sa'ar 4 class	2	(Israel)		Israel Shipyards	SLNS Nandimithra (P701)	2000	415	ex-INS Komemiyut
Sa'ar 4 class	2	(Israel)		Israel Shipyards	SLNS Suranimala (P702)	2000	415	ex-INS Moledet

=== Fast Gun Boats ===
Class	In service	Origin	Picture	Builder	Boats	Comm.	Disp. (t)	Notes
Bay class	2	(Australia)		Austal	SLNS Mihikatha (P350)	2014	134	ex-ACV Corio Bay
Bay class	2	(Australia)		Austal	SLNS Rathnadeepa (P351)	2014	134	ex-ACV Hervey Bay
Lushun class	2	(China)			SLNS Prathapa (P340)	1998	212	
Lushun class	2	(China)			SLNS Udara (P341)	2000	212	
Shanghai II class	3	(China)			SLNS Abeetha II (P316)	2000	135	
Shanghai II class	3	(China)			SLNS Edithara II (P317)	2000	135	
Shanghai II class	3	(China)			SLNS Wickrama II (P318)	2000	135	
Shanghai III class	4	(China)			SLNS Ranarisi (P322)	1992	170	
Shanghai III class	4	(China)			SLNS Ranajaya (P330)	1996	170	
Shanghai III class	4	(China)			SLNS Ranadheera (P331)	1996	170	
Shanghai III class	4	(China)			SLNS Ranawickrema (P332)	1996	170	

=== Fast Attack Crafts (FAC) ===
Class	In service	Origin	Picture	Builder	Boats	Comm.	Disp. (t)	Notes
Colombo class	22	(Sri Lanka)		Colombo Dockyard	Unknown		52–56	
Dvora – Mk I	4	(Sri Lanka) (Israel)		Colombo Dockyard	P440	1988	45	
Dvora – Mk I	4	(Sri Lanka) (Israel)		Colombo Dockyard	P441	1988	45	
Dvora – Mk I	4	(Sri Lanka) (Israel)		Colombo Dockyard	P442	1988	45	
Dvora – Mk I	4	(Sri Lanka) (Israel)		Colombo Dockyard	P443	1988	45	
Super Dvora Mk II	3	(Israel)		IAI-Ramta	Unknown		60	
Shaldag class	7	(Israel)		Israel Shipyards	P470	Unknown	72	
Shaldag class	7	(Israel)		Israel Shipyards	P471	Unknown	72	
Shaldag class	7	(Israel)		Israel Shipyards	P472	Unknown	72	
Shaldag class	7	(Israel)		Israel Shipyards	P473	Unknown	72	
Shaldag class	7	(Israel)		Israel Shipyards	P474	Unknown	72	
Shaldag class	7	(Israel)		Israel Shipyards	P475	Unknown	72	
Shaldag class	7	(Israel)		Israel Shipyards	P476	Unknown	72	
Super Dvora Mk III	6	(Israel)		IAI-Ramta	P4442	Unknown	60	
Super Dvora Mk III	6	(Israel)		IAI-Ramta	P4443	Unknown	60	
Super Dvora Mk III	6	(Israel)		IAI-Ramta	P4444	Unknown	60	
Super Dvora Mk III	6	(Israel)		IAI-Ramta	P4445	Unknown	60	
Super Dvora Mk III	6	(Israel)		IAI-Ramta	P4446	Unknown	60	
Super Dvora Mk III	6	(Israel)		IAI-Ramta	P4447	Unknown	60	

=== Inshore Patrol Crafts ===
Class	In service	Origin	Picture	Builder	Boats	Comm.	Disp. (t)	Notes
Cedric class	154+	(Sri Lanka)		Naval Boat Building Yard	Unknown			Use by its littoral warfare units RABS and SBS.
Trinity Marine class	5	(United States)			P480	Unknown		
Trinity Marine class	5	(United States)			P481	Unknown		
Trinity Marine class	5	(United States)			P483	Unknown		
Trinity Marine class	5	(United States)			P484	Unknown		
Trinity Marine class	5	(United States)			P485	Unknown		
Wave Rider class	38+	(Sri Lanka)		Naval Boat Building Yard	Unknown			

== Amphibious Warfare fleet ==
=== Landing Ship Tanks (LST) ===
Class	In service	Origin	Picture	Builder	Boats	Comm.	Disp. (t)	Notes
Yuhai class	1	(China)		Qingdao Shipyard	SLNS Shakthi (L880)	1996	800	

=== Landing Craft Utility (LCU) ===
Class	In service	Origin	Picture	Builder	Boats	Comm.	Disp. (t)	Notes
Ranavijaya class	2	(Sri Lanka)		Colombo Dockyard	SLNS Ranagaja (L836)	1991	128	
Ranavijaya class	2	(Sri Lanka)		Colombo Dockyard	SLNS Ranavijaya (L839)	1994	128	

=== Landing Craft Mechanized (LCM) ===
Class	In service	Origin	Picture	Builder	Boats	Comm.	Disp. (t)	Notes
Yunnan class	2	(China)		Huangzhou Shipyard	L820	Unknown	137	
Yunnan class	2	(China)		Huangzhou Shipyard	L821	Unknown	137	

== Auxiliary Vessels fleet ==
=== Fast Personnel Carrier (FPC) ===
Class	In service	Origin	Picture	Builder	Boats	Comm.	Disp. (t)	Notes
High-speed catamaran	2	(Singapore)			SLNS Hansaya (A540)	1987	169	
High-speed catamaran	2	(Norway)		Kvaerner Fjellstrand	SLNS Lanka Rani (A543)		444	

=== Diving Support Vessels ===
Class	In service	Origin	Picture	Builder	Boats	Comm.	Disp. (t)	Notes
—N/a	1	(Poland)		Gdynia Shipyard	A521	Unknown	591	ex-Simon Keghian; Gifted by a French organization.

== Future ships ==
Class	On order	Origin	Picture	Builder	Boats	Disp. (t)	Notes
Frigates
Gepard Class	N/A	(Russia)		Zelenodolsk Shipyard	Unknown	1,360	In 2017, it was reported that Sri Lanka had ordered a Gepard-class frigate from Russia.
Floating dock
Floating Dock Navy	1	(India)		Goa Shipyard	Unknown	4,000	Launched 19 February 2026. To be based at SLN Dockyard. Indian grant of ~US$20 million. Designed for vessels up to 115m.

== See also ==
- List of Sri Lanka Army equipment
- List of Sri Lanka Air Force active aircraft

== External links & sources ==
- Sri Lank Navy website
- Defenders of the ocean receive heroes’ welcome on their triumphant return to home base
- Sri Lanka Navy destroys the 10th LTTE arms ship 1700 km off Dondra
- lankanavy.blogspot.com
