= SLNS =

SLNS may refer to:

- SLNS (Sri Lanka), Sri Lanka Navy equipment
- Signed Logarithmic Number System, a type of logarithmic number system
