= GSL-class power barge =

GSL class of power barge are series of four yardcrafts built by Goa Shipyard Limited for Indian Navy.

GSL class power barge
Yard Number	Name	Delivery
1163	P B I	28 October 1988
1164	P B II	28 December 1988
1165	P B III	23 March 1989
1166	P B IV	23 March 1989
