= GSL-class service barge pontoon =

A GSL service barge pontoon is a non self-propelled yardcraft built by Goa Shipyard Limited for the Indian Navy.

The pontoon is a catamaran having rectangular shaped, flat-bottomed hulls. The hulls are connected by trusses of round pipes and steel deck transverse beams. Each hull is divided into eight watertight compartments. The pontoon have cylindrical rubber fenders of 600 mm O.D. installed on both sides to absorb impacts and low reaction loads. Structural provisions have been made for vertical roller fenders at the forward and aft corners on the side facing the ship. The fenders are not installed/fitted. The pontoon is intended for berthing service barges on a ship by serving as spacers between the service barge and the ship. The pontoon deck is used for temporary storage of cargos during handling/mooring.

It was built as part of an order to construct four berthing pontoons, one service barge pontoon and four gangways. The request for proposal was issued on 7 March 2011 and the contract was signed in June 2011. By February 2013 it had been delivered and was stationed at Naval Dockyard, Mumbai. GSL class berthing pontoons are its cousin sister ships.

== Dimension ==
- Length overall : 40.0 m
- Breadth without fenders : 9.0 m
- Depth moulded : 4.0 m
- Design draught : 1.4 m
- Lightweight : 300 tons

=== Operating Performance ===
- Towing speed : 6 knots .
- Sea state during mooring : Sea state 5
- Design wave height under sea state 5 : 3.5 m
- Maximum wind speed : 35 m/s
- Permissible load on pontoon deck : 8 T/m

== See also ==
- GSL class berthing pontoon
