= Saryu-class patrol vessel =

Offshore patrol vessels of Indian Navy

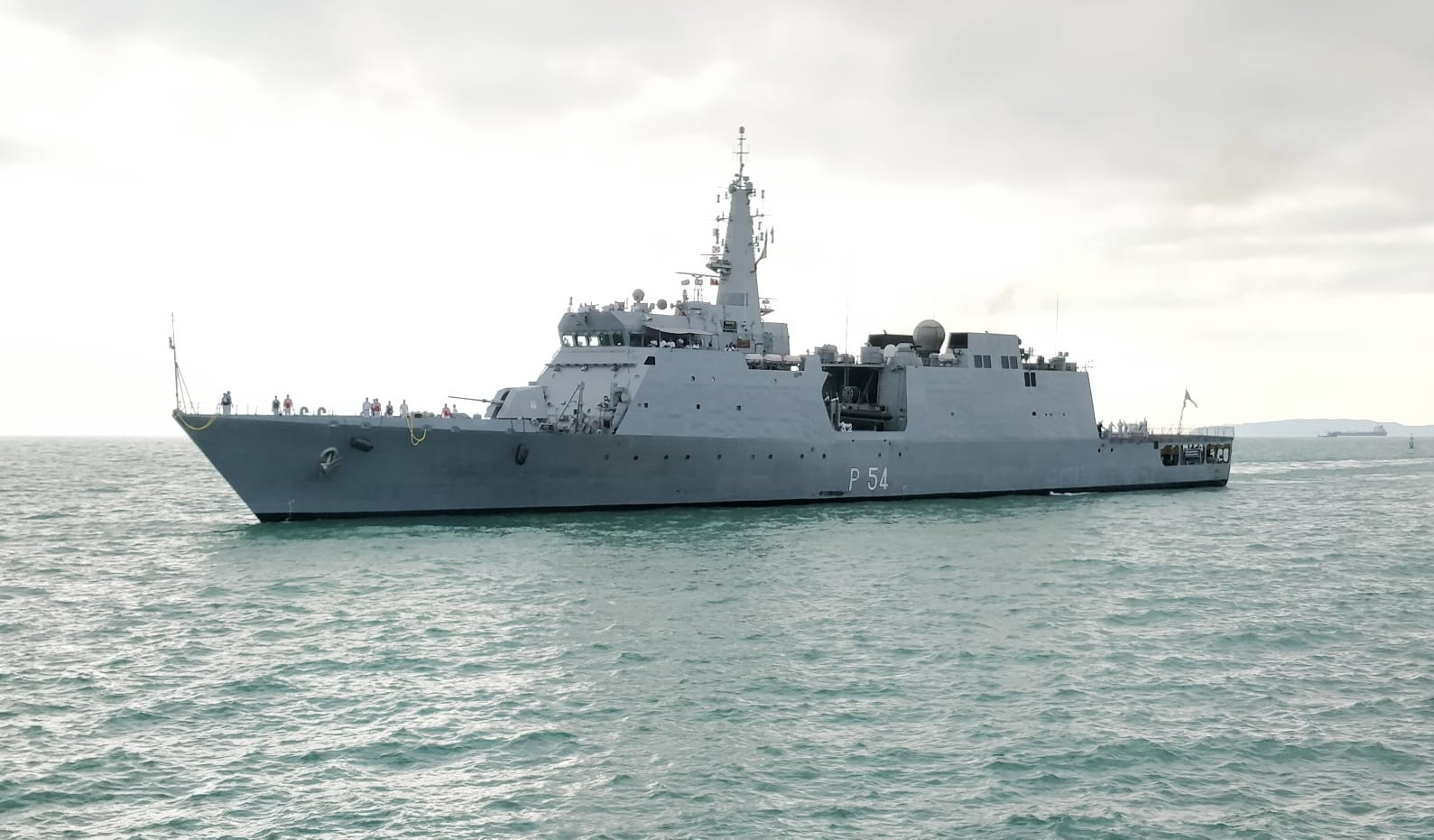
- INS Saryu en-route to Phuket, Thailand.

Class overview
- Name: Saryu class
- Builders: Goa Shipyard Limited
- Operators: Indian Navy; Sri Lanka Navy
- Preceded by: Sukanya class
- Succeeded by: Shachi class (2017) (cancelled); Shachi class (2026)
- In commission: 2013 – present
- Planned: 6
- Completed: 6
- Active: 6

General characteristics
- Type: Offshore patrol vessel
- Displacement: 2,230 t (2,190 long tons; 2,460 short tons)
- Length: 105 m (344 ft)
- Beam: 12.9 m (42 ft)
- Draught: 4.9 m (16 ft)
- Propulsion: 2 × Pielstick PA 6B STC diesel engines, 21,725 PS (15,979 kW)
- Speed: 25 kn (46 km/h)
- Range: 6,000 nmi (11,000 km) at 16 kn (30 km/h)
- Complement: 16 officers and 102 sailors
- Sensors & processing systems: Sperry Bridgemaster I-band navigation radar; EON-51 electro-optical FCS
- Electronic warfare & decoys: Sanket Mk III Electronic Support System; Communication Intelligence System ELK 7036; 4 × Kavach chaff launchers
- Armament: 1 × 76 mm/62 Oto Melara gun; 2 × 30 mm/65 AK-630 CIWS
- Aircraft carried: 1 × HAL Dhruv

The Saryu class of offshore patrol vessels (OPV) are advanced patrol ships of the Indian Navy built at the Goa Shipyard Limited. These vessels are capable of ocean surveillance and monitoring and can maintain control of shipping lanes. They can also be deployed to provide security to offshore oil installations, and other naval assets.

== Design and development ==
Saryu class was derived from Sankalp-class vessels built for the Indian Coast Guard. The ships were designed by GSL's in-house design team and built at a cost of ₹2,452 crore (equivalent to ₹60 billion or US$620 million in 2026). The vessels are powered by two Pielstick diesel engines rated at a combined 21,725 metric horsepower (15,979 kW), each driving a Wärtsilä WCP 5C10 controllable-pitch propeller through a reduction gearbox.

== Construction ==
The first ship, INS Saryu was launched on 30 March 2009 in the presence of Chief of the Naval Staff, Admiral Sureesh Mehta. INS Saryu was handed over to the Navy on 21 December 2012 and was commissioned on 21 January 2013 at Vasco da Gama, by the Commander-in-Chief of Andaman and Nicobar Command, Air Marshal P K Roy.

The second ship, INS Sunayna, was handed over to the Indian Navy on 2 September 2013; her first CO was to be Cdr Aftab Ahmed Khan. The three remaining ships were delivered subsequently with an interval of six months each. INS Sumitra, the fourth and last OPV, was delivered to the Navy by GSL on 16 July 2014. Two ships were delivered to Sri Lankan Navy in 2017 and 2018.

== Ships of the class ==
Name	Pennant	Keel laid	Launched	Delivered	Commissioned	Status	Notes
Indian Navy
Saryu	P54	15 December 2006	30 March 2009	21 December 2012	21 January 2013	Active	
Sunayna	P57	25 September 2007	14 November 2009	2 September 2013	15 October 2013	Active	
Sumedha	P58	7 May 2008	21 May 2011	14 January 2014	7 March 2014	Active	
Sumitra	P59	28 April 2010	6 December 2010	16 July 2014	4 September 2014	Active	
Sri Lanka Navy
Sayurala	P623	10 September 2014	11 June 2016	22 July 2017	2 August 2017	Active	
Sindurala	P624	9 May 2015	2 May 2017	22 March 2018	19 April 2018	Active	

== Operators ==
- Indian Navy
- Sri Lanka Navy

== Gallery ==
Saryu-class ships at sea
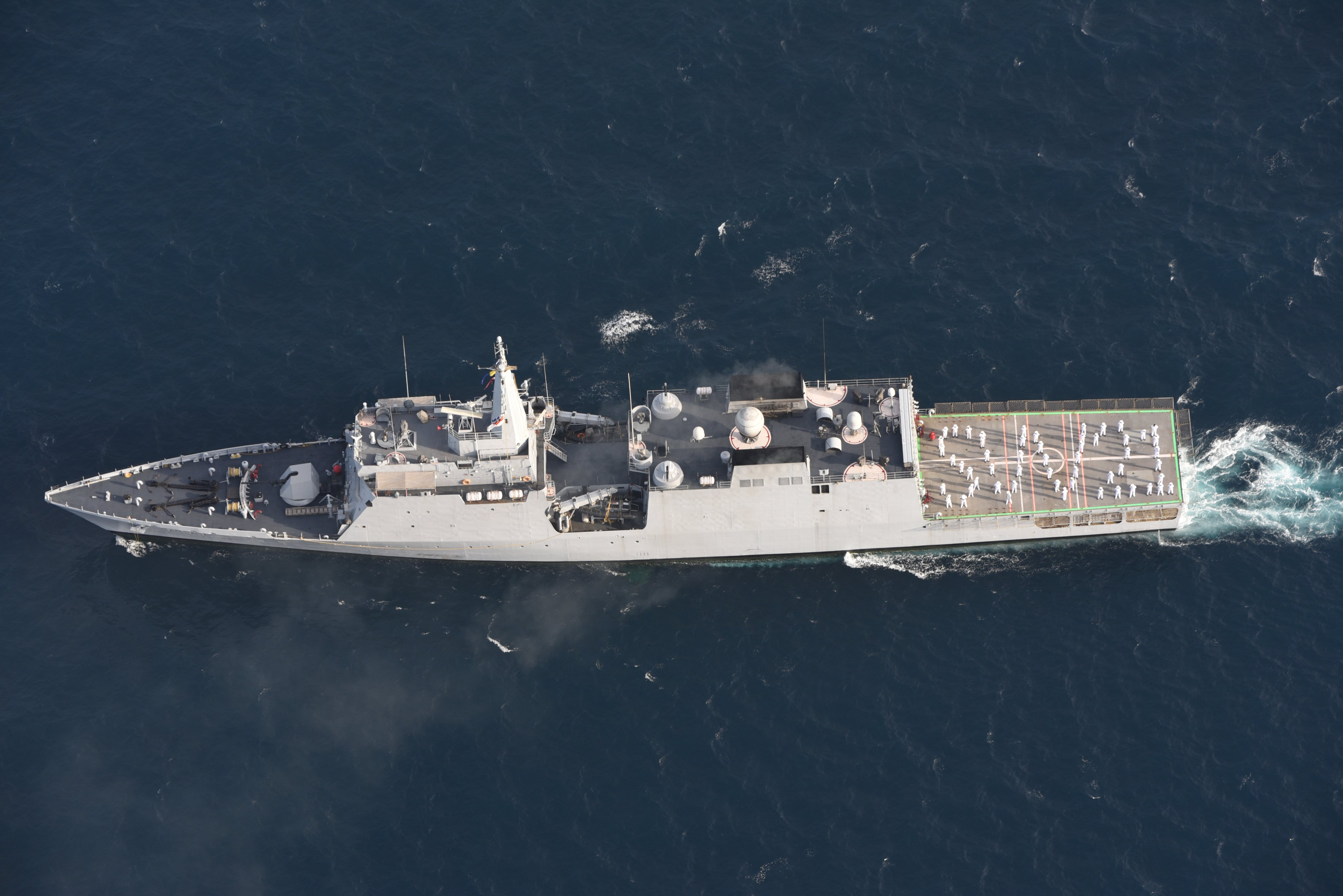
Top view of Saryu

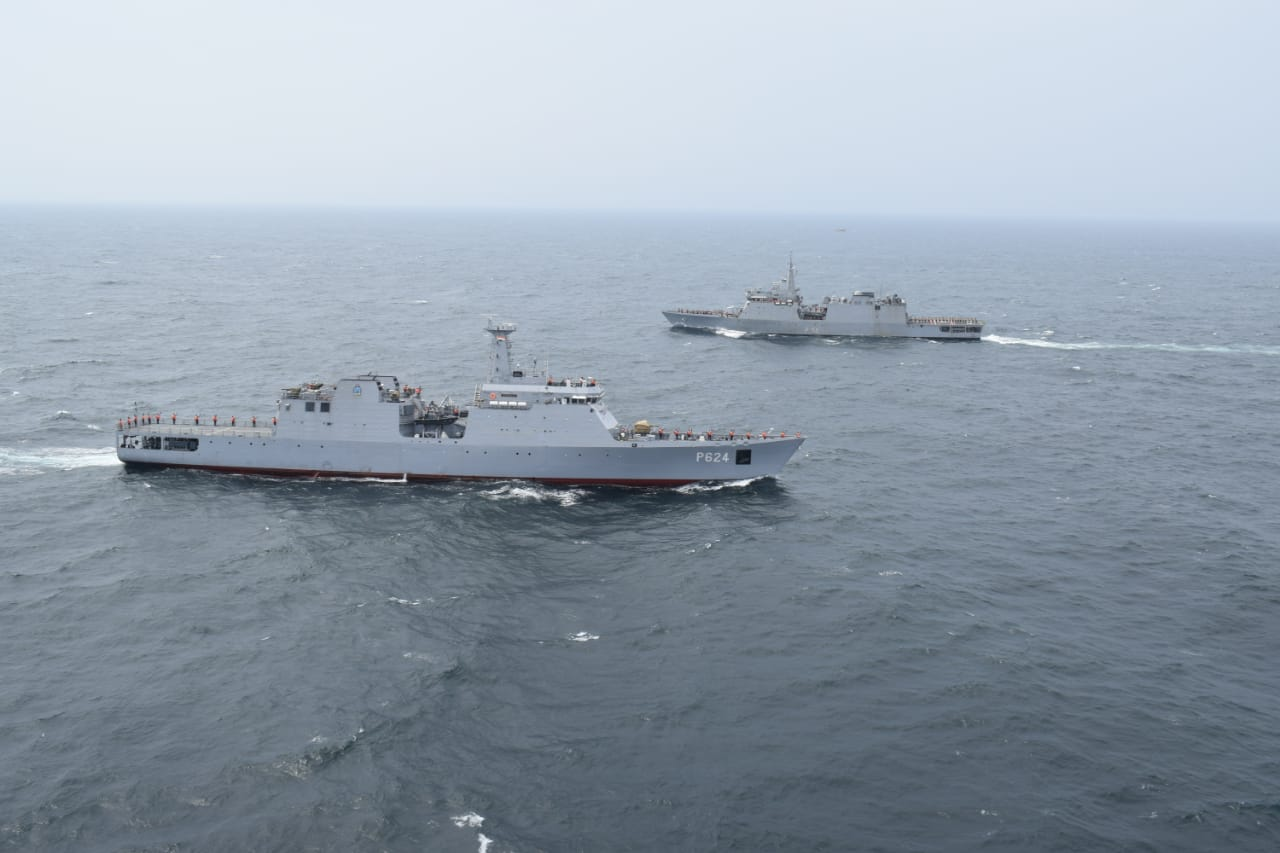
SLNS Sindurala and Sumedha during SLINEX 2019

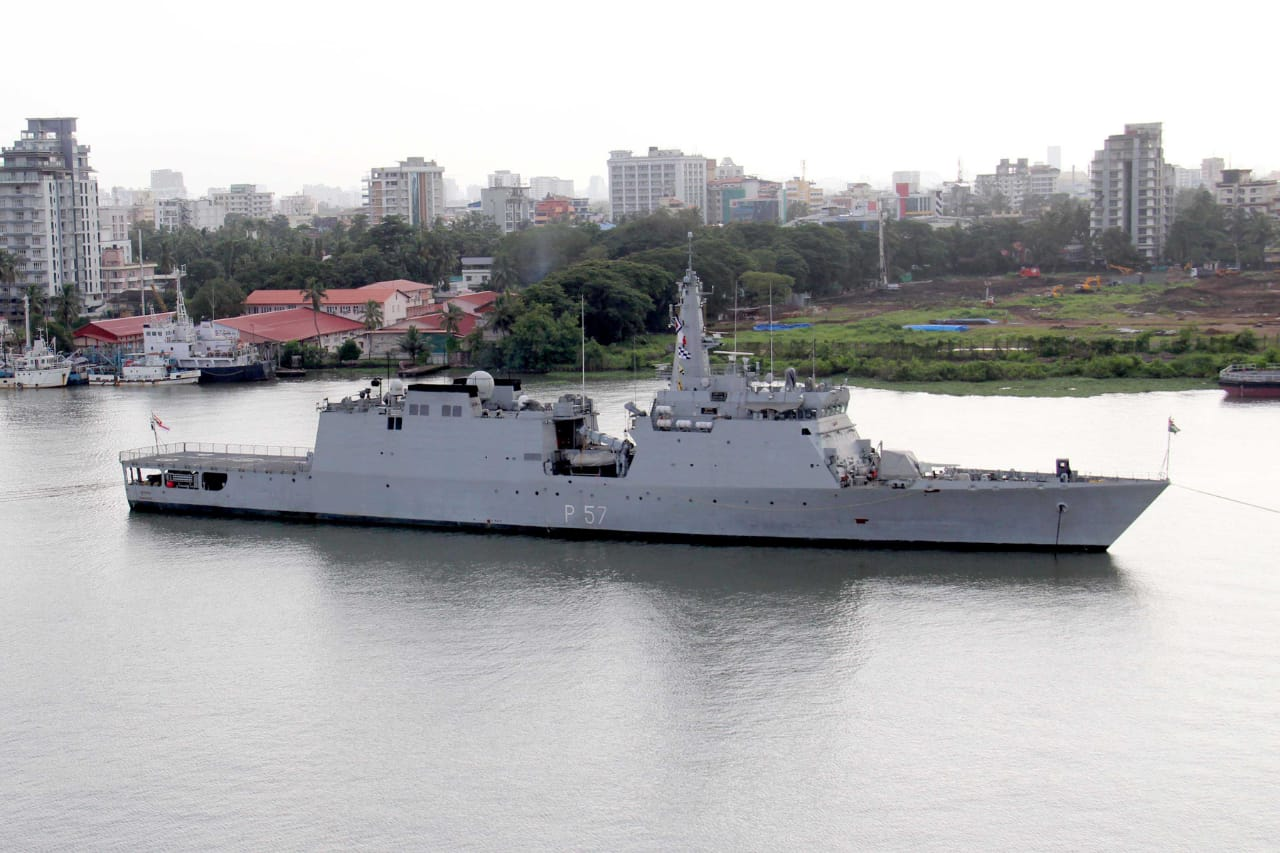
Sunayna returns to Kochi post an 80 day anti piracy patrol in the Gulf of Aden.

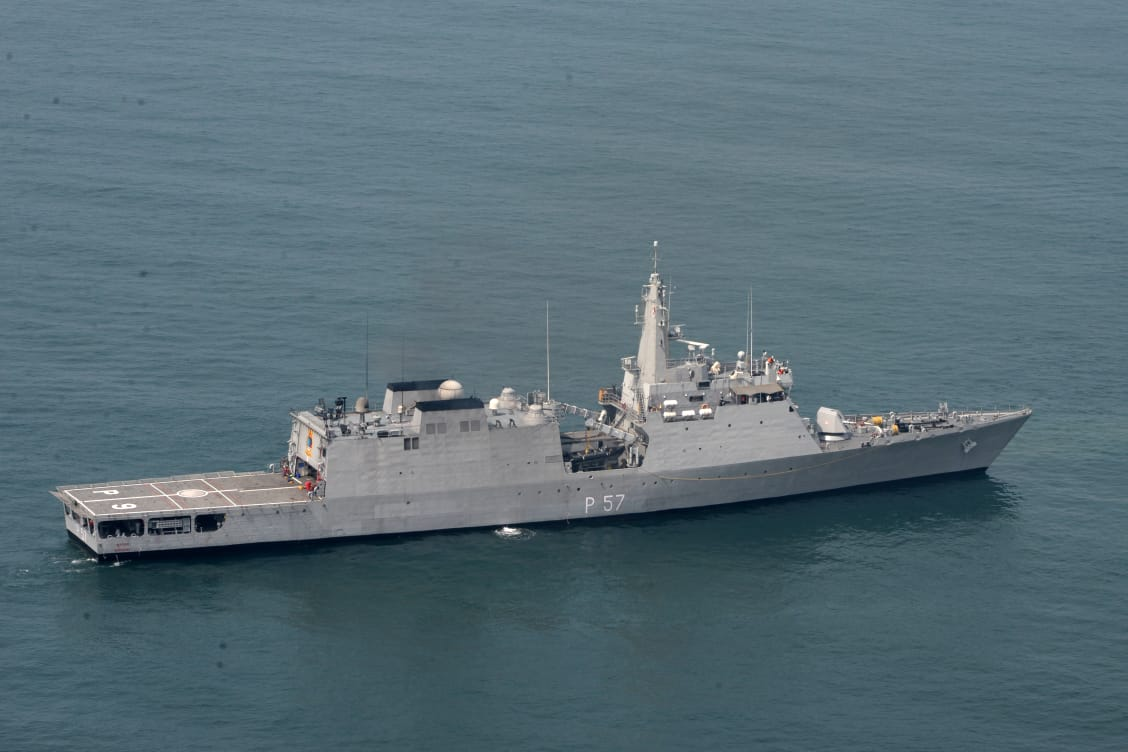
Sunayna at sea.

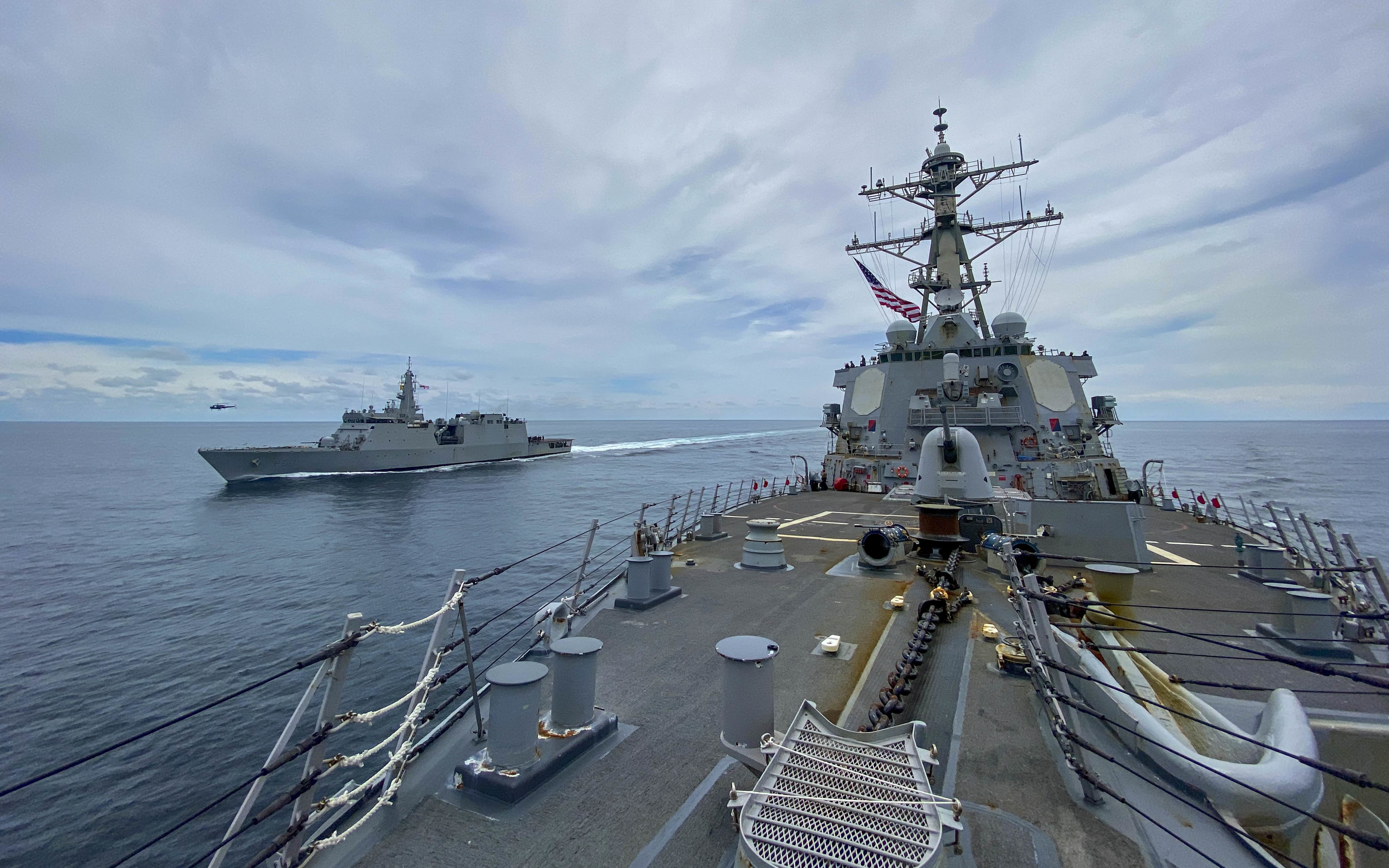
USS Russell (DDG-59) with Sumitra during a passex exercise.

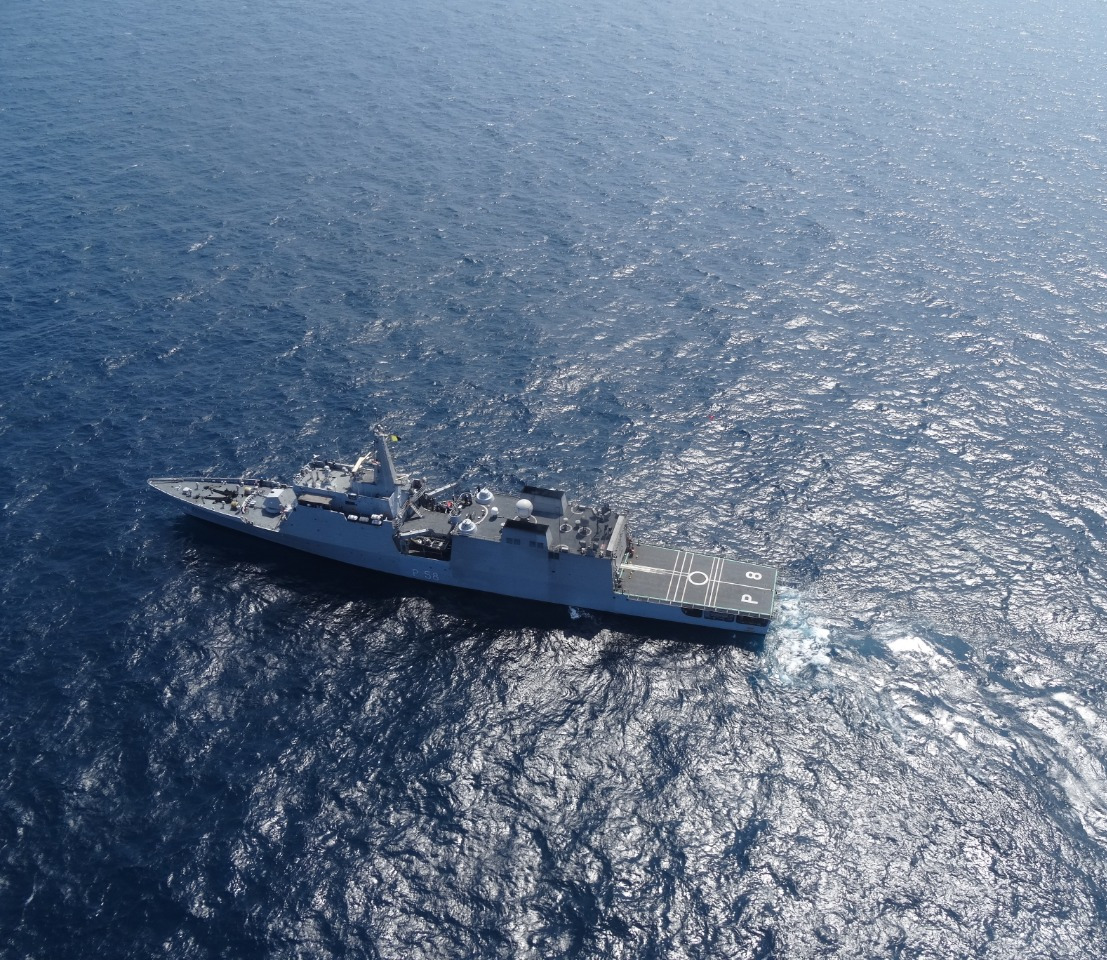
Sumedha en-route to Mongla, Bangladesh

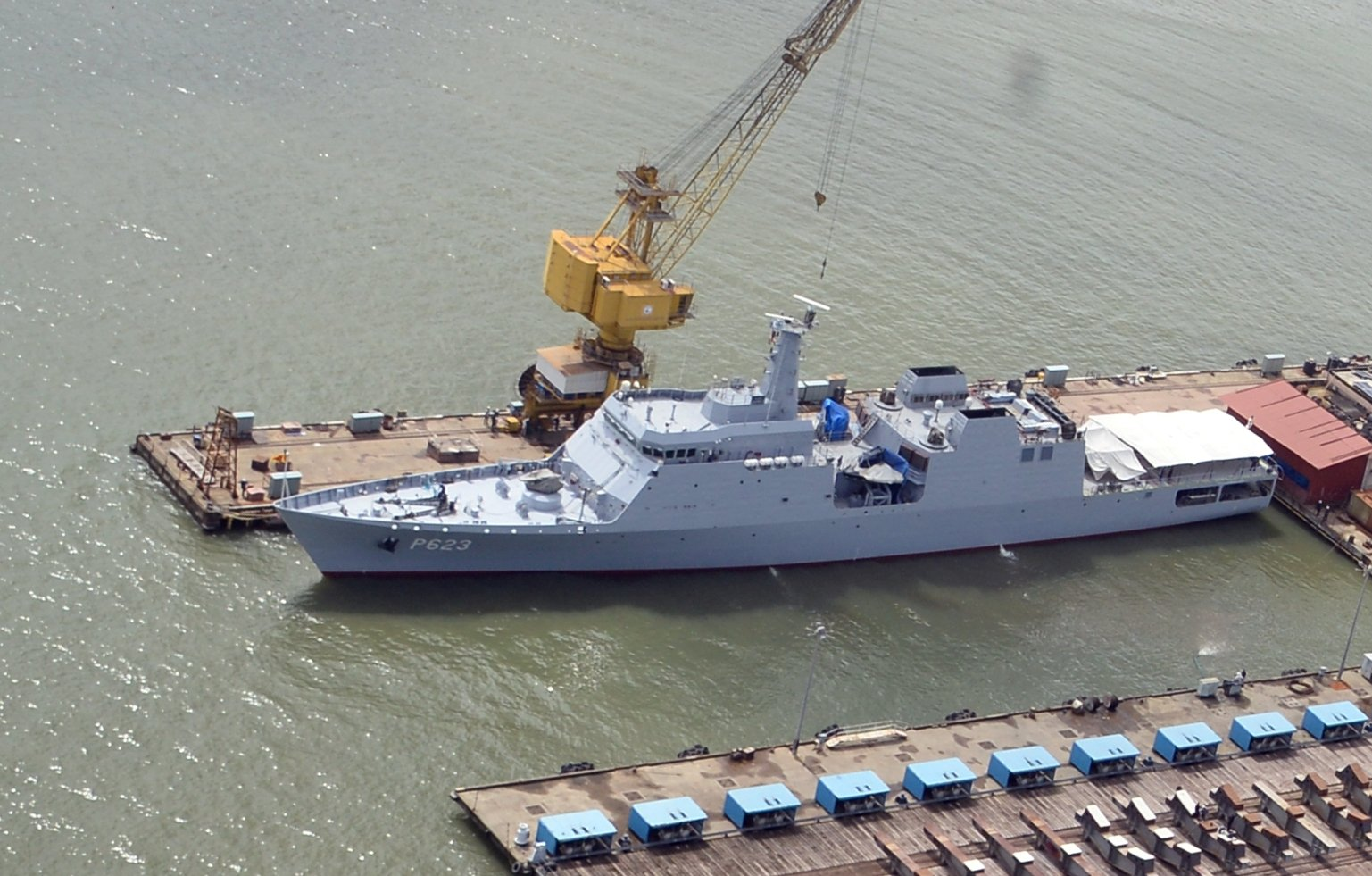
SLNS Sayurala at Goa Shipyard.

== See also ==
- List of active Indian Navy ships
- List of Sri Lanka Navy equipment
