= GSL-class berthing pontoon =

Class of jetty berthing pontoons

External image
- GSL class pontoon
- GSL Pontoon For INS Vikramaditya

The GSL class of jetty berthing pontoons are a series of four non self-propelled yardcraft built by Goa Shipyard Limited for the Indian Navy.

The pontoons are catamarans with rectangular shaped twin flat-bottomed hulls. The twin hulls are connected by trusses of round pipes with a steel deck covering the transverse beams. Each hull is divided into eight watertight compartments. The pontoons have hydro-pneumatic fenders on both sides to facilitate high energy absorption and low reaction loads. Two vertical roller fenders are located at the forward and aft corners, on the side, for corner protection. They are intended for berthing vessels having displacement up to 40,000 tons on a jetty by serving as spacers between the jetty and the ship.

They were built as part of an order to also construct one Service Barge Pontoon and four gangways. The request for proposal was issued on 7 March 2011 and the contract was signed in June 2011. By February 2013 all four pontoons had been delivered. Two pontoons were stationed at Naval Dockyard, Mumbai and two at the Naval Base in Karwar.

== Dimension ==
- Length overall : 40.0 m
- Breadth without fenders : 9.0 m
- Depth moulded : 4.0 m
- Design draught : 1.4 m
- Lightweight : 300 tons

=== Operating Performance ===
- Towing speed : 6 knots .
- Sea state during mooring : Sea state 5
- Design wave height under sea state 5 : 3.5 m
- Maximum wind speed : 35 m/s
- Permissible load on pontoon deck : 8 T/m

== See also ==
GSL service barge pontoon
