= INS Jyoti =

Komandarm Fedko class replenishment oilers

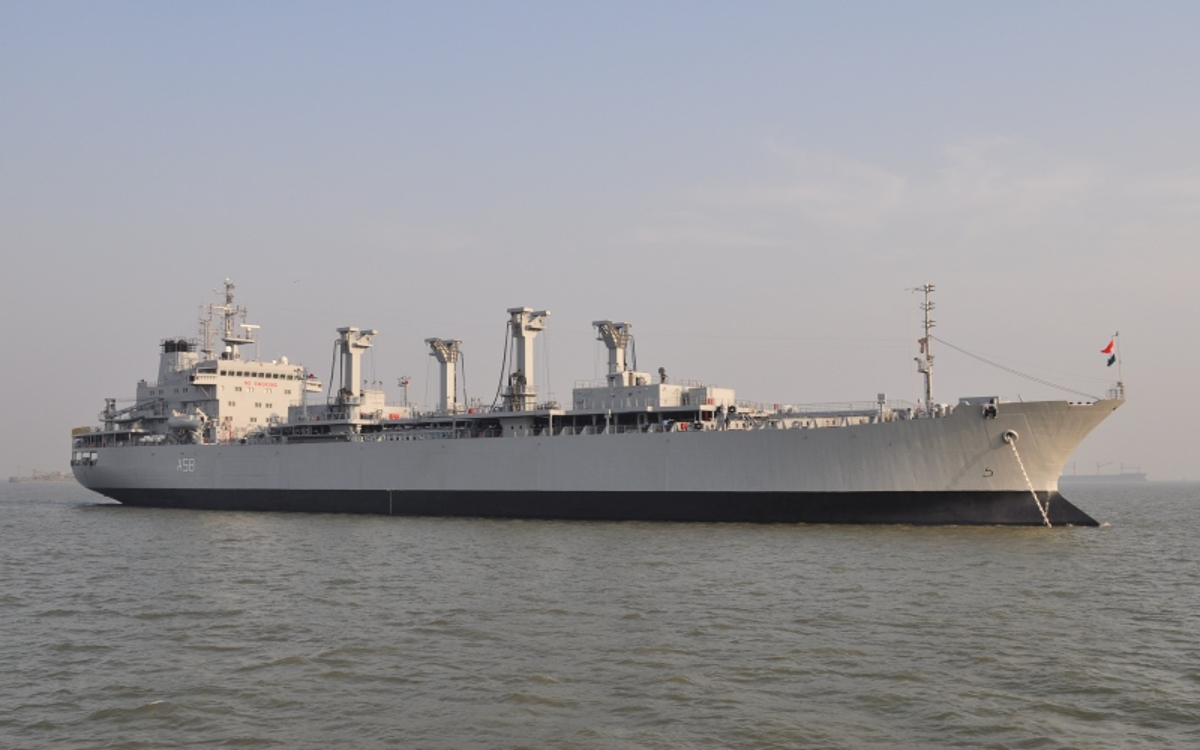
- INS Jyoti

History

India
- Name: Jyoti
- Operator: Indian Navy
- Builder: Admiralty Shipyard, St. Petersburg
- Laid down: September 1993
- Launched: 8 December 1995
- Completed: 1995
- Commissioned: 20 July 1996
- Identification: IMO number: 9063029; MMSI number: 419000003; Callsign: VVXY
- Status: Active

General characteristics
- Class & type: Komandarm Fedko-class replenishment oiler
- Displacement: 35,900 tonnes (35,300 long tons; 39,600 short tons) full load
- Length: 178 m (584 ft)
- Beam: 25.3 m (83 ft)
- Draught: 11.35 m (37.2 ft)
- Propulsion: One Bryansk–Burmeister & Wain 6DKRN60/195 diesel, 10,948 bhp. 1 fixed pitch propeller.
- Speed: 15 knots (28 km/h; 17 mph)
- Range: 12,000 nautical miles (22,000 km; 14,000 mi) at 15 knots (28 km/h; 17 mph)
- Complement: 208 (incl. 23 officers)
- Sensors & processing systems: 2 x Decca 1226 navigation radars
- Armament: Close-in weapons systems for self-protection
- Armor: Twin-hulled
- Aircraft carried: 1 Alouette III helicopter
- Aviation facilities: A helicopter deck
- Notes: Cargo capacity: 28,000 tons at full load

INS Jyoti (A58) (meaning: sacred light) is the third of four Komandarm Fedko-class replenishment oilers. She was modified for naval use and is now being operated by the Eastern Naval Command of the Indian Navy. Jyoti was the largest ship in the navy until INS Vikramaditya (R33) was commissioned in November 2013. It is the third largest ship in the Indian Navy after the aircraft carriers INS Vikrant and INS Vikramaditya. Its primary role is fleet replenishment and sustaining blue-water operations. It was later fitted with close-in weapon systems for self-defence.

It is a major force multiplier in sustaining the navy's blue water operations. It can increase the range of a naval task force without tanker support from seven days and 2400 nautical miles to 50 days and 16,800 nautical miles.

== Design and description ==
=== General characteristics and propulsion ===
INS Jyoti has a length of 178 m (584 ft) overall, a beam of 25.3 m (83 ft) and a draft of 11.35 m (37.2 ft). The ships displaces about 35,900 tonnes (35,300 long tons; 39,600 short tons) at full load. The complement is about 208, including 23 officers.

The ship is powered by a Bryansk–Burmeister & Wain 6DKRN60/195 diesel (a licence-built MAN-B&W 6L60MC) delivering 10,948 hp (8,164 kW) to a single fixed pitch propeller. This allows the ship to reach a maximum speed of 15 knots (28 km/h; 17 mph) for an endurance of 12,000 nautical miles (22,000 km; 14,000 mi).

=== Capacity ===
Displacing 39,900 tons at full load, the Jyoti is the second largest ship of the navy, even larger than the decommissioned 28,500 tons aircraft carrier INS Viraat. The ship can carry 28,000 tons at full load, consisting of fuel diesel, aviation fuels, oils, and water of different grades. The fresh water carried for use in steam turbines is of much higher grade than drinking water.

Jyoti has two replenishment positions on each side, with the option of stern refueling and can replenish three ships simultaneously. It can refuel at a rate of 300 tonnes per hour. It has a range of 12,000 nautical miles at the top speed of 15 knots. It has a double-skin hull, which prevents sea pollution in case of damage to any fuel tank, and carries eco-friendly equipment on board to prevent marine and environmental pollution. The space between the double-hull is used for ballast tanks. The fuel and water levels in the cargo tanks are checked to maintain the ship's stability during loading and discharging of supplies.

=== Armament ===
It was initially armed with light and medium machine guns. In 2000, self-defence capabilities were added by installing new close-in weapons like anti-aircraft and anti-missile guns and missiles. This was done to enhance the survivability of the ship during surface warfare operations on India's western seaboard. It also has a helicopter deck.

== Procurement and service ==
INS Jyoti was constructed by the Admiralty Shipyard of St. Petersburg, Russia. It was built to be a Project 15966M merchant tanker, but was modified and purchased by the Indian Navy, and was commissioned on 20 July 1996.

=== Service history ===
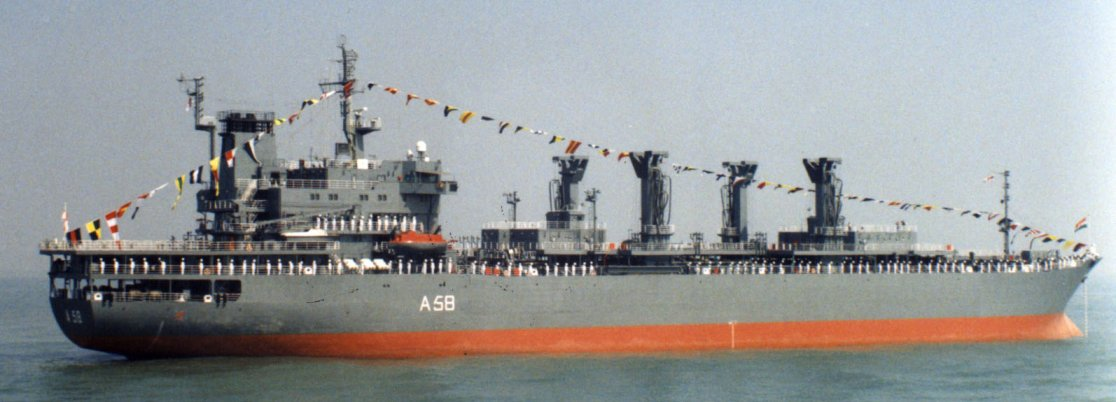
INS Jyoti in a previous grey livery

==== 1998 ====
Growth in the India-Philippines relations broadened ways for the cooperation between navies. Three Indian naval ships - INS Delhi, INS Khanjar and INS Jyoti visited the Philippines from 24–27 October 1998.

On 28 March 1998, four civilian workmen were killed in a gas explosion on-board the Jyoti at the naval dockyard.

==== 2001 ====
INS Jyoti and INS Mumbai were deployed to South East Asia and the South West Pacific. The ships made port calls at Fremantle, Sydney, Wellington and Ho Chi Minh City.

==== 2003 ====
INS Jyoti visited the Shanghai naval base in 2003 as part of a three-vessel fleet, for a five-day official visit. The fleet was commanded by flag officer Rear Admiral R. P. Suthan of India's Eastern Naval Command. It comprised a guided missile destroyer INS Ranjit, a guided missile corvette INS Kulish and the INS Jyoti. The fleet held airborne and surface search and rescue exercises with China's East Sea Fleet, which were code-named Dolphin 0311. Before the joint exercise, the Chinese and Indian ships also conducted maritime communication and formation maneuvers. These were the first joint naval exercises between China and India. The fleet left Shanghai on 14 November 2003.

==== 2007 ====
In early 2007, a fleet of ships from the navy's Eastern command conducted a two-month-long deployment in the South-East and East Asia. The ships, guided-missile destroyers INS Mysore, INS Rana and INS Ranjit, the guided-missile corvette, INS Kuthar and the fleet tanker INS Jyoti, were under the command of Flag Officer Commanding Eastern Fleet, Rear Admiral R K Dhowan. From 18 March to 23 May, the fleet made port-calls at a number of ports, including Singapore, Yokosuka in Japan, Qingdao located on the southern coast of the Shandong peninsula of China, Ho Chi Minh City in Vietnam, and Vladivostok in Russia. The fleet left Qingdao on 16 April 2007, and then conducted joint anti-terror exercises with the Russian Navy.

During September 2007, the navy deployed three ships - INS Delhi, INS Beas and INS Jyoti on a four-day goodwill mission to Oman, to strengthen maritime relations and develop maritime cooperation. The deployment was led by Rear Admiral Shekhar Sinha, Flag Officer Commanding Western Fleet.

==== 2009 ====
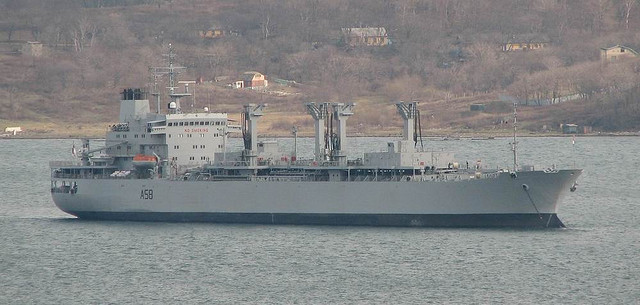
INS Jyoti in 2009

In 2009, the Jyoti, along with INS Mumbai, INS Ranvir and INS Khanjar took part in an international fleet review at Qingdao, conducted by China's People's Liberation Army Navy (PLAN) on its 60th anniversary. Twenty one naval vessels from 14 nations and delegations from 29 countries took part in the review, which lasted from 20 to 24 April. The fleet then proceeded to Okinawa in Japan, and took part in Malabar 2010 with the US Navy's Seventh fleet and the Japanese Maritime Self-Defense Force. The other ships were the USS Blue Ridge, guided missile destroyers USS Fitzgerald and USS Chafee, fast-attack submarine USS Seawolf of the US Navy, and two guided-missile destroyers, including JDS Asayuki of the JMSDF, along with various P-3C and SH-60 aircraft. The exercise involved air defence, anti-submarine and surface warfare.

==== 2010 ====
By 2010, the ship had completed thirteen years in the navy, during which time it had undertaken 2504 underway replenishment runs and travelled 375,282 nautical miles. It had operated in the Indian Ocean, South China Sea, Red Sea, Persian Gulf and the Pacific Ocean and had participated in numerous multinational exercises with the navies of the United States of America, South Korea, Philippines, Japan and Singapore etc.

In April 2010, it took part in the 17th Singapore-Indian Maritime Bilateral Exercise (SIMBEX) with the Singapore Navy. SIMBEX-2010 was held in the Andaman Sea and the Bay of Bengal. Five platforms of the Indian Navy took part, namely INS Batti Malv, a fast-attack craft and INS Mahish, a landing ship tank from the Andaman & Nicobar Command, destroyer INS Ranvir, the tanker INS Jyoti and a submarine from the Eastern Naval Command. The Singapore Navy was represented by two ships, RSS Intrepid, a Formidable-class frigate and RSS Victory, a Victory-class corvette. During the exercise, Jyoti simultaneously refueled INS Ranvir and RSS Intrepid. The fleet later called at Port Blair and Visakhapatnam.

In May 2010, the navy’s Eastern Fleet deployed INS Jyoti, along with the guided-missile destroyers INS Rana and INS Ranjit and missile corvette INS Kulish from Port Blair to South East Asia, where the fleet undertook passage exercises with the navies of Indonesia, Singapore and Australia. Jyoti was under the command of Captain A Venugopal NM and carried a complement of 19 officers and 170 sailors. The fleet sailed under the command of Flag Officer Commanding Eastern Fleet, Rear Admiral P N Murugesan and made port calls at Jakarta (Indonesia), Hai Phong (Vietnam), Manila (Philippines), Muara (Brunei), Bangkok (Thailand), Fremantle (Australia), Singapore and Port Kelang (Malaysia). At Port Kelang, the fleet conducted anti-piracy exercises with the Malaysian Navy from 20 to 23 June, and left port on 23 June.

==== 2011 ====
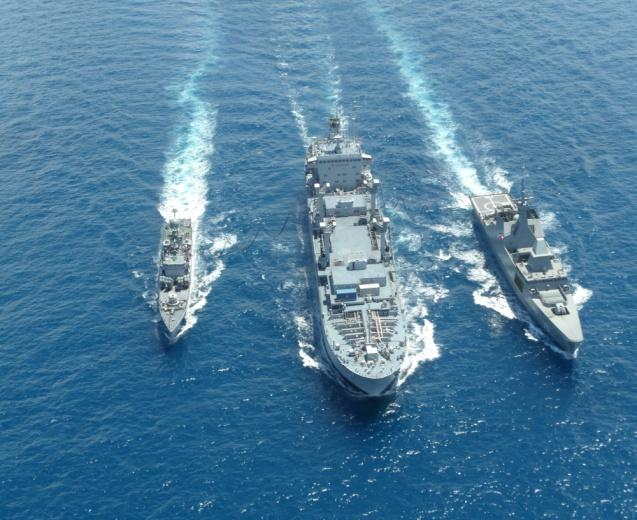
Corvette INS Kirch (P62) and fleet tanker INS Jyoti (A58) of the Indian Navy with a frigate of the Singaporean Navy during SIMBEX 2011 in the South China Sea.

In early 2011, the ship was part of a fleet of warships from the Eastern Fleet which went on an operational deployment in South East Asia and the Western Pacific. The flotilla was composed of the INS Delhi, INS Ranvijay, INS Ranvir, INS Jyoti and INS Kirch, and carried 1,400 naval personnel on board. They were commanded by Rear Admiral Harish Chandra Singh Bisht. The flotilla, along with an Indian Navy maritime reconnaissance aircraft took part in a five-day exercise SIMBEX 2011 with the Singapore Navy in the South China Sea. Four naval ships including a submarine of the Singapore Navy were commanded by Rear Admiral Joseph Leong, Fleet Commander of the Republic of Singapore Navy. The Indian fleet then proceeded on its forward deployment, and made port calls at Alava pier in Subic Bay (Philippines), Vlapostok (Russia), Manila (Philippines), Ho Chi Minh City (Vietnam), Bandar Seri Begawan (Brunei), Kota Kina Balu (Malaysia) and Jakarta (Indonesia). The ships also visited China, Japan and South Korea. After exercising with the U.S. Navy, the fleet conducted drills at Vladivostok with the Russian Navy's Pacific Fleet. This was the second time the Indian Navy had made a port call at Vladivostok.

From 2–10 April, the ship as part of the flotilla took part in the Malabar 2011 exercise with the U.S. Navy's 7th Fleet.

In May 2011, Jyoti and Ranvir, led by Captain Sunil Balakrishnan, were deployed to Brunei, and docked at Muara port. The purpose of the visit was to build on cultural and diplomatic relations between the two countries.

==== 2025 ====
On 14 August 2025, INS Jyoti along with INS Rana (D52) arrived at the Port of Colombo, Sri Lanka, for the 12th edition of Sri Lanka–India Naval Exercise (SLINEX-25). The edition was hosted by Sri Lanka between 14 and 18 August 2025. The harbour phase was conducted from 14 to 16 August at the Port of Colombo followed by the sea phase on 17 and 18 August. Two advanced offshore patrol vessels SLNS Gajabahu (P626) and SLNS Vijayabahu (P627) represented Sri Lanka. A Special Forces team of both the navies also participated in the exercise. While the 180.16 m-long, 200 crew-strong INS Jyoti is being commanded by Captain Chetan R Upadhyay, the 147 m-long, 300 crew-strong INS Rana is being commanded by Captain KP Sreesan. The Indian Naval Ships also displayed the tricolour at Colombo on the 79th Indian Independence Day on 15 August. The ships were also complemented by a Sri Lanka Air Force Bell 412 helicopter during the sea phase of the exercise.

==== 2026 ====
INS Jyoti participated at the International Fleet Review 2026 held at Visakapatanam. She also took part in Sri Lanka–India Naval Exercise (SLINEX-26) from 17 to 21 September 2026 at the Visakhapatnam Port along with INS Kavaratti (P31) and SLNS Sindurala (P624) of the Sri Lanka Navy.

== See also ==
- INS Deepak
- INS Shakti
- INS Aditya
