= INS Saryu =

Indian Saryu-class patrol vessel

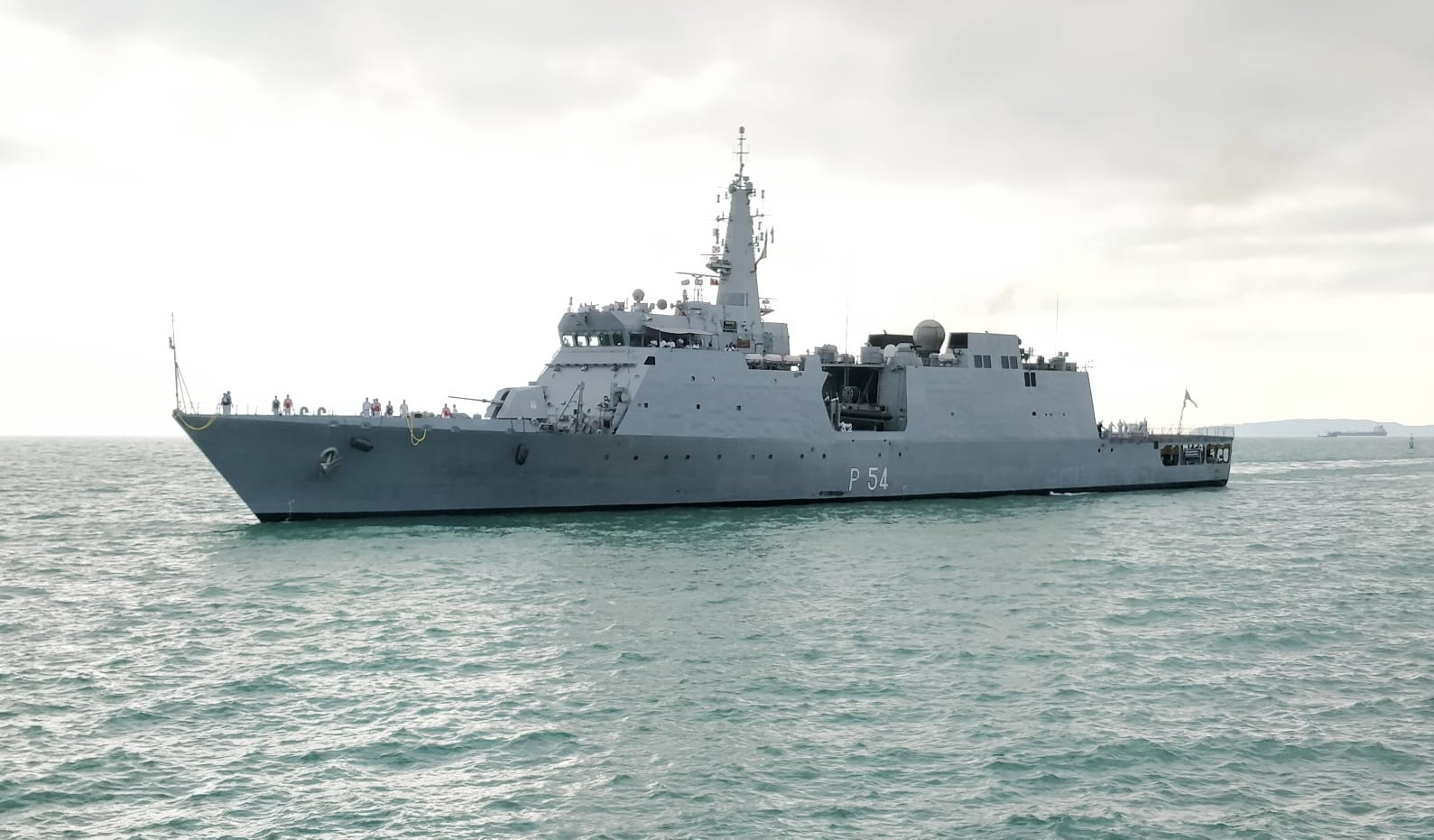
- INS Saryu en-route to Phuket.

History

India
- Name: INS Saryu
- Namesake: Saryu river
- Operator: Indian Navy
- Builder: Goa Shipyard Limited
- Cost: ₹6.2 billion (US$64 million)
- Launched: 30 March 2009
- Completed: 21 December 2012
- Commissioned: 21 January 2013
- Identification: Pennant number: P54
- Status: Active

General characteristics
- Class & type: Saryu-class patrol vessel
- Tonnage: 2,300 tonnes (2,300 long tons; 2,500 short tons)
- Length: 105 m (344 ft)
- Beam: 12.9 m (42 ft)
- Height: 3.6 m (12 ft)
- Installed power: 2 x 7790 kW engines
- Propulsion: Two SEMT Pielstick diesel engines
- Speed: 25 knots (46 km/h; 29 mph)
- Range: 6,000 kilometres (3,700 mi) at 16 knots (30 km/h; 18 mph)
- Endurance: Two months
- Complement: Eight officers and 105 sailors
- Armament: 1 × OTO Melara 76 mm gun; 2 × AK-630 (30 mm Close-in weapon systems (CIWS); 6 × self-protection chaff launchers; Fire-control system
- Aircraft carried: 1x HAL Dhruv or 1x HAL Chetak

INS Saryu is the first Saryu-class patrol vessel of the Indian Navy, designed and constructed indigenously by the Goa Shipyard Limited. The ship is home-ported at Port Blair, under the Andaman and Nicobar Command (ANC). She is the largest offshore patrol vessel in the navy.

== Design and development ==
The Saryu-class patrol vessels were ordered for the navy by the Ministry of Defence in December 2008, for performing coastal patrol. Goa Shipyard Limited (GSL) became the first Indian shipyard to have designed and constructed this class of warship completely indigenously.

Saryu is the most advanced vessel to be constructed by GSL in terms of design, performance and quality. The ship has been designed by an in-house team and was built at the cost of ₹6.2 billion (US$64 million). Construction of the vessel took three and a half years, and was delayed due to late supply of gearboxes by the Indian supplier. A new order for the gearboxes was then placed with another manufacturer, which delivered them in early December 2011. Saryu was then completed by November 2012. Three more vessels of the class are being constructed for the navy, and all will be delivered by 18 months (from the commissioning of Saryu), each at an interval of six months.

INS Saryu was launched on 30 March 2009 by the Chief of Naval Staff, Admiral Sureesh Mehta. The navy took delivery of the ship on 21 December 2012 and she was commissioned on 21 January 2013 at Vasco da Gama, by the Commander-in-Chief of the Andaman and Nicobar Command (ANC), Air Marshal P.K. Roy.

== Description ==
The ship has a range of 6,000 kilometres (3,200 nmi), and can remain deployed at sea for two months without replenishment. She is crewed by eight officers and 105 sailors. She is armed with an Italian-made OTO Melara 76-millimetre (3.0 in) gun; two Russian-made AK-630 six-barrelled 30-millimetre (1.2 in) close-in weapon systems (CIWS), and six self-protection chaff launchers, all of which are controlled by an on-board electro-optic fire-control system. She also has navigational and early warning radars, and an integrated electronic warfare system. She carries two rigid inflatable fast-motor boats alongside a multi-role helicopter like the HAL Dhruv or HAL Chetak.

Propulsion and power are electronically controlled by a remote-control system, and the power management system is automatic. A fully integrated LAN and a CCTV management system is used to increase efficiency of the crew and optimally utilise the ship's equipment. Propulsion is provided by two SEMT Pielstick diesel engines, which are the largest engines of their type in the Indian Navy, and propel the ship to more than 25 knots (46 km/h; 29 mph).

== Service history ==
Saryu is home-ported at Port Blair in the Andaman and Nicobar Islands, under the ANC. Her first commanding officer is Commander Amanpreet Singh, who will be commanding a ship for the second time. The ship will enhance the off-shore surveillance and maritime patrolling capability of the A&N command, where she will be used to patrol India's exclusive economic zone (EEZ) and sea lines of communication. She will also perform anti-piracy patrols and fleet-support operations like providing security to off-shore installations and escorting high-value assets.

== Gallery ==
Saryu-class ships at sea
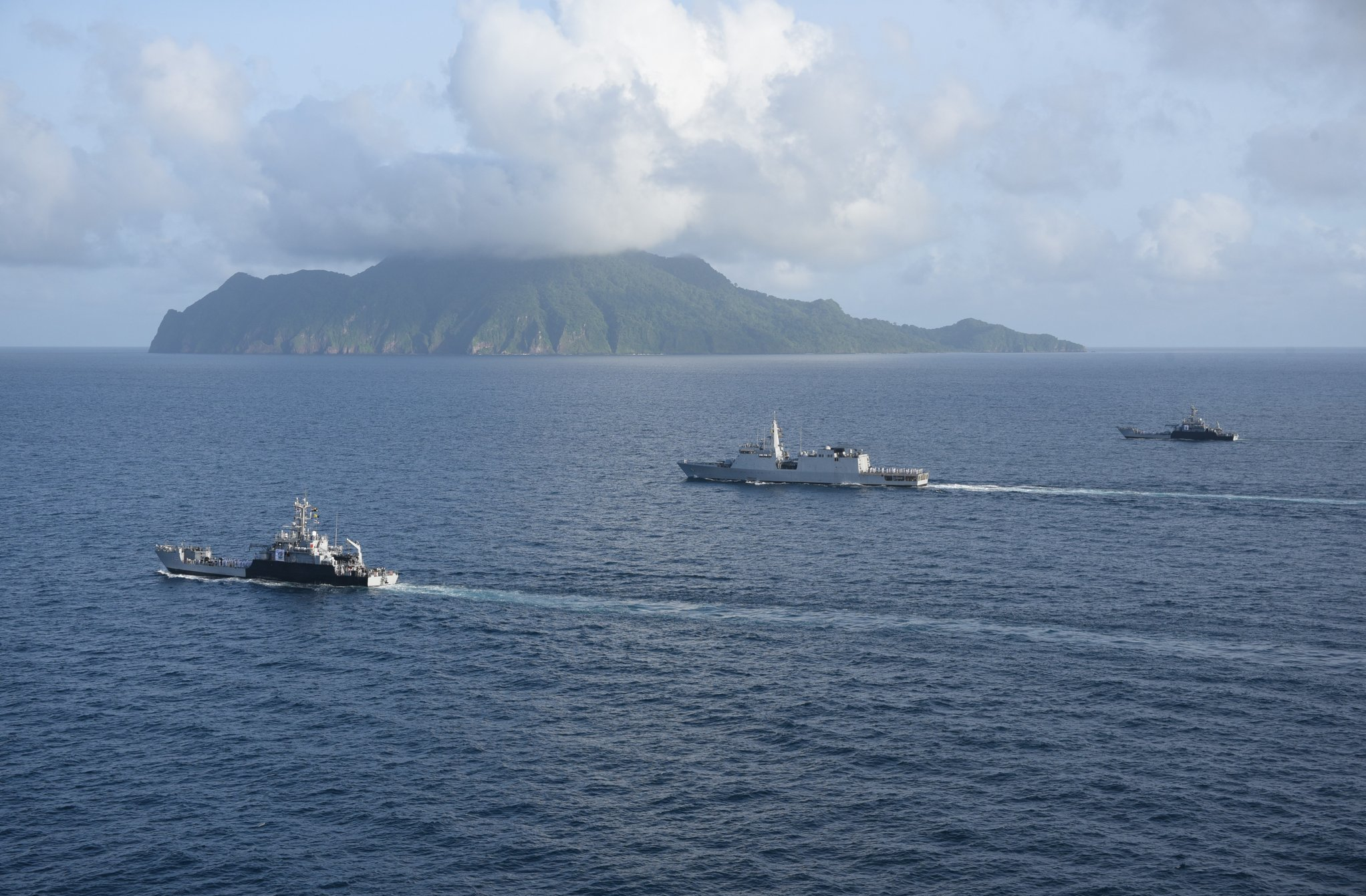
Indian Navy Landing Craft Utility IN LCU 58 & IN LCU 54 accompanied by INS Saryu (P54).

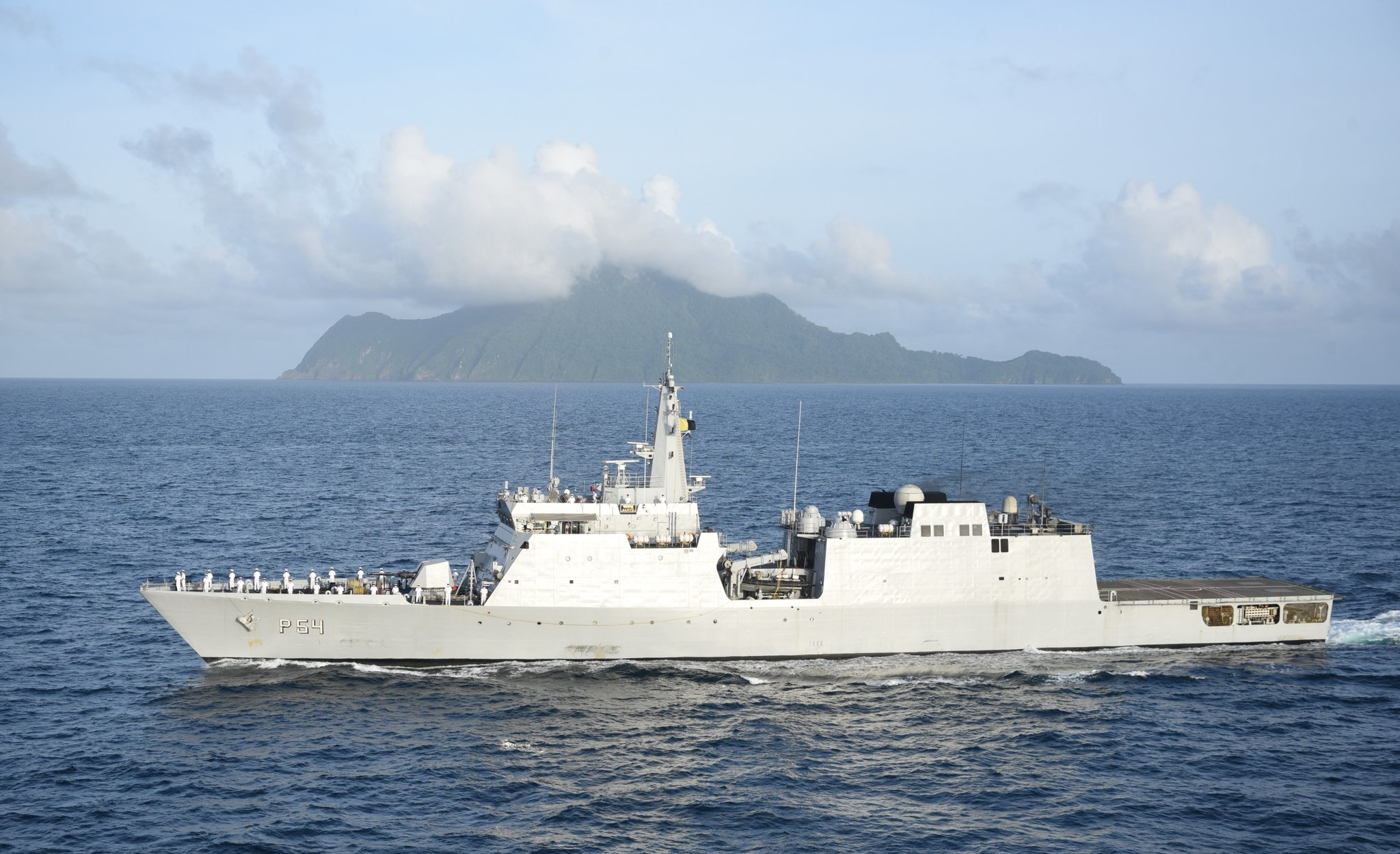
INS Saryu (P54) carrying the victory flame of Swarnim Vijay Varsh through the Andaman & Nicobar Islands
