= INS Rana (D52) =

Rajput class destroyer

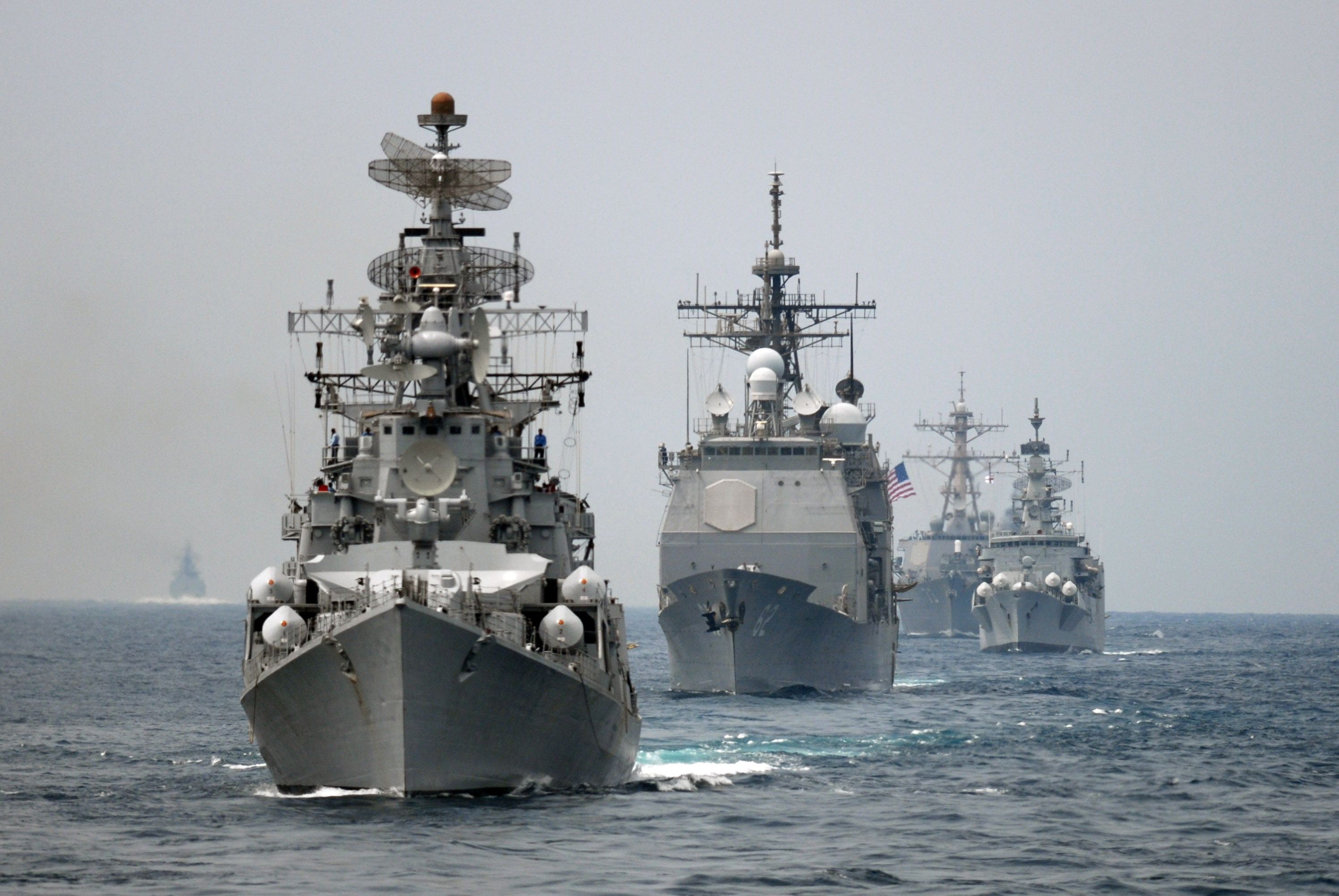
- INS Rana leads the passing exercise formation

History

India
- Name: Rana
- Namesake: Maharana Pratap
- Builder: 61 Kommunara Shipbuilding Plant
- Commissioned: 19 February 1982
- Identification: Pennant number: D52; MMSI number: 419100003; Callsign: ATZL
- Status: Active

General characteristics
- Class & type: Rajput-class destroyer
- Displacement: 3,950 tons standard, 4,974 tons full load
- Length: 147 m (482 ft)
- Beam: 15.8 m (52 ft)
- Draught: 5 m (16 ft)
- Propulsion: 4 x gas turbine engines; 2 shafts, 72,000 hp (54,000 kW)
- Speed: 35 knots (65 km/h)
- Range: 4,000 miles (6,400 km) at 18 knots (33 km/h); 2,600 miles (4,200 km) at 30 knots (56 km/h)
- Complement: 320 (including 35 officers)
- Sensors & processing systems: Navigation: 2 x Volga (NATO: Don Kay) radar at I-band frequency, Air: 1 x MP-500 Kliver (NATO: Big Net-A) radar at C-band or 1 x Bharat RAWL (Dutch Signaal LW08) radar at D-band, Air/Surface: 1 x MR-310U Angara (NATO: Head Net-C) radar at E-band, replaced by 1 x EL/M-2238 STAR (Removed by 2025), replaced by indigenous Multi-Functional AESA Radar; Communication: Inmarsat, Sonar: 1 x hull mounted Vycheda MG-311 (NATO: Wolf Paw) sonar replaced with Bharat HUMSA during MLR, 1 x Vyega MG-325 (NATO: Mare Tail) variable depth sonar
- Armament: Anti-surface: 4 × SS-N-2D Styx AShM missiles (Removed by March 2025); Air-defence: 16 × VL-SRSAM; 1 × S-125M SAM launcher (Removed by March 2025); Guns: OTO Melara 76 mm naval gun (formerly AK-726 twin 3" naval gun); 4 × 30 mm AK-630M CIWS; Anti-submarine: 1 × 533 mm PTA 533 quintuple torpedo tube launcher, 2 × RBU-6000 anti-submarine mortars,
- Aircraft carried: 1 x HAL Chetak helicopter

INS Rana (lit. 'King') is a Rajput-class destroyer in active service with the Indian Navy. She was commissioned on 19 February 1982.

She was the only ship of her class which was not upgraded like the other two ships, which had been upgraded with Israeli Barak 1 missiles and EL/M-2238 STAR radars. An upgrade in 2022 armed her with new short range SAM VL-SRSAM in 8 × 2 cell VLS configuration replacing one S-125 Neva/Pechora launcher in the Aft. It was also seen with 4 panels of AESA radar as fire-control radar.

By early 2025, Rana was first modified, with the forward S-125M SAM launcher and her Styx missile tubes being removed, with the ship also serving as a test ship for new systems.

== Service history ==
=== 2007 ===
The Rana, the INS Ranjit, the corvette INS Kuthar and maritime patrol aircraft represented the Indian Navy at the Singapore - India Maritime Bilateral Exercise (SIMBEX) held from 23 to 28 March. The Republic of Singapore Navy was represented by the missile corvettes RSS Valour and RSS Vigour, missile gunboat RSS Sea Dragon, anti-submarine patroller RSS Gallant and submarine RSS Chieftain, along with maritime patrol aircraft.

The Rana, Ranjit, Kuthar, destroyer INS Mysore, tanker INS Jyoti and Indian naval aircraft represented the Indian Navy at the first 2007 edition of the Malabar naval exercise held off the coast of Okinawa Island from 6 to 11 April. The US Navy was represented by the guided missile destroyers USS John S. McCain, USS Mustin, USS Curtis Wilbur, USS Fitzgerald, and USS Stethem; frigate USS Gary, nuclear submarine USS Greenville, three SH-60B helicopters, one SH-60F helicopter and a P-3C maritime patrol.

The Rana and the Ranjit made a call at Qingdao Port, China in from 12 to 16 April 2007. The two ships conducted passage exercises with the PLAN Qingdao as the latter escorted them during their departure from the port.

The Rana, Ranjit, Kuthar, Mysore and Jyoti along with multiple naval aircraft represented the Indian Navy at Indra 2007, an annual bilateral exercise between India and Russia. The Russian Navy was represented by the two anti-submarine destroyers Marshal Shaposhnikov and Admiral Vinogradov, the Dubna-class tanker Pechenga, one missile boat, one diesel submarine, several minesweepers and a pair of tugboats, all unnamed, along with two Ka-27 anti-submarine helicopters and an IL-38 maritime patrol aircraft. Rear Admiral Viktor Chirkov led the Russian Flotilla. The exercise was held in Vladivostok from 22 to 26 April.

Rear Admiral Robin K. Dhowan commanded the Indian ships for the entirety of their deployments in 2007, in his role as Flag Officer Commanding Eastern Fleet (FOCEF).

In April 2008, she visited Bangkok with the Kirpan. Later that month she visited Manila in the Philippines.

From 5–6 June 2010, she made a friendly visit to Fremantle, Australia to enhance bilateral cooperation between the Indian and Australian navies.

Vice admiral Karambir Singh, Flag Officer Commanding in Chief of Eastern Naval Command, who assumed duty as the 24th Chief of the Naval Staff (India), after Admiral Sunil Lanba, on 31 May 2019, had sea commands of the Guided Missile Destroyers INS Rana and INS Delhi (D61).

=== 2011 ===
On 17 January, which is Navy Day in India, the Rana and the corvette INS Kulish showcased their capabilities to the public off the coast of Chennai, performing exercises like search and rescue operations and anti-aircraft fire among other drills.

=== 2012 ===
==== South China Sea and the North West Pacific ====
The ships, as part of a battle group of 4 ships began a sustained operational deployment to the South China Sea and the North West Pacific Ocean. The other three ships were the Shakti, a Deepak-class fleet tanker, the Shivalik, a stealth frigate, and the Karmuk, a Kora-class corvette. This battle group was under the command of Rear Admiral Ajit Kumar P, Flag Officer Commanding, Eastern Naval Command. According to the Ministry of Defence, the two-month deployment, far from India's usual area of operations, along with naval exercises with a number of countries, aimed to demonstrate the Indian navy's operational reach.

During the deployment, the battle group participated in passage exercises with the navies of the countries visited. The passage exercises focused on humanitarian aid & disaster relief operations and visit, board, search and seizure (VBSS) drills for anti-piracy operations. These exercises aimed to increase naval interoperability, enabling the two navies to function together smoothly during possible disaster-relief operations.

==== JIMEX 2012 ====
The ship was deployed in the North West Pacific for JIMEX 2012 (Japan-India Maritime Exercise) with the four ship group, and took part in India's first bilateral maritime exercise with Japan held off Yokosuka. The Japanese Maritime Self-Defence Force (JMSDF) was represented by the two destroyers JS Onami and JS Hatakaze, one maritime patrol aircraft and a helicopter.

The four ships entered Tokyo on 5 June after visiting Singapore, Vietnam, Philippines and Republic of Korea. They stayed in Tokyo for 3 days. This visit coincided with commemoration of 60 years of diplomatic relations between India and Japan. Then Vice Admiral Anil Chopra, Flag Officer Commanding-in-Chief Eastern Naval Command also visited Tokyo to witness the first JIMEX.

==== Southeast Asia ====
After the deployment in the North Pacific, the battle group was deployed in the South China Sea. As part of India's Look East policy, the ships visited the Shanghai port on 13 June 2012, for a five-day goodwill tour. Shakti served as the fuel and logistics tanker to the three destroyers. The ships left the port on 17 June 2012. Before leaving the port, the ships conducted routine passage exercise with the People's Liberation Army Navy.

After the visits to Singapore, Vietnam, Philippines, Japan, South Korea and China, the ships visited Port Klang, Malaysia. This was the last port call of the battle group, after which it returned to the Eastern fleet of the Indian Navy, after being on a two-month-long deployment which started in May 2012.

=== 2018 ===
The Rana visited Ho Chi Minh City, Vietnam as part of a goodwill visit from 27 to 30 September. The Rana visited Jeju Naval Base in South Korea to participate in an International Fleet Review, as part of its operational deployment to the North West Pacific from 8 to 15 October. The ship took part in passing exercises with the ROK Navy when it departed from South Korea in November. The Rana docked at Manila in the Philippines for a four-day goodwill visit beginning 24 October.

On 1 November, the Rana arrived in Singapore for a four-day goodwill visit. The Rana visited Surabaya port in Indonesia to participate with the Indonesian Navy in the bilateral exercise Samudra Shakti held from 12 to 18 November. The harbor phase was held from 12 to 15 November, while the sea phase was held from 16 to 18 November. The operations conducted include joint maneuvers, helicopter operations, and drills for surface warfare, anti submarine warfare and anti piracy missions.

=== 2020 ===
The Rana and the Kulish conducted exercises with the JMSDF training ship JS Kashima and destroyer JS Shimayuki on 27 June. Vice Admiral Pradeep Chauhan noted that "Exercises like these remind Beijing that the Indian military can quickly deny air cover for Chinese naval assets in the Indian Ocean - and that such plans are ready. They are still far away from deploying an (aircraft) carrier in the Indian Ocean.”

On 20 July, the Rana along with other Indian ships participated in cooperative exercises with US Navy ships off the coast of the Andaman and Nicobar Islands. The other ships from the Indian Navy were the stealth frigates INS Sahyadri and INS Shivalik, and the missile corvette INS Kamorta. The US Navy was represented by Carrier Strike Group 11 (CSG 11), comprising the flagship aircraft carrier USS Nimitz, the guided missile cruiser USS Princeton (CG-59), and the guided missile destroyers USS Sterett (DDG-104) and USS Ralph Johnson. The Indian ships were commanded by Rear Admiral Sanjay Vatsayan, the Flag Officer Commanding Eastern Fleet. The US contingent was commanded by Rear Admiral Jim Kirk, commander of CSG 11. The exercises aimed to achieve maximal interoperability between the two navies. The Indian press saw the exercises as signaling offensive capabilities to China following the Galwan incident; the exercises were held in a region where ships can blockade the Malacca Strait, through which most of China's oil imports and a high percentage of other trade passes.

The Rana was part of the Indian contingent for the 27th edition of SIMBEX. The other ships from the Indian Navy were the corvettes INS Kamorta and INS Karmuk, and the submarine INS Sindhuraj; Chetak helicopters on board the Rana and P8I maritime patrol aircraft were also part of this group. The Republic of Singapore Navy was represented by the frigates RSS Intrepid and RSS Steadfast, landing ship tank RSS Endeavour and S70B helicopters. The drills conducted during the exercise were for advanced, anti-air and anti-submarine warfare. The exercise was held in the Andaman Sea from 23 to 25 November.

=== 2023 ===
On 30 June, the Rana and the patrol craft INS Sumedha took part in a Maritime Partnership Exercise with the FS Surcouf while the latter was on a visit to Visakhapatnam. The three ships conducted tactical manoeuvres, replenishment at sea approaches, air defence drills and cross deck helicopter operations.

=== 2025 ===
Between 28 March and 2 April 2025, Rana and INS Kuthar (P46) participated in Exercise INDRA with the Russian Navy's Pechanga (Dubna class), Rezkiy (Steregushchiy class), Aldar Tsydenzhapov (Steregushchiy class).

On 11 August 2025, Rana arrived at the Port of Trincomalee, Sri Lanka, on a formal visit. After completing its official engagements, the vessel departed the port on 14 August 2025. On 14 August 2025, INS Rana along with INS Jyoti (A58) arrived at the Port of Colombo, Sri Lanka, for the 12th edition of Sri Lanka–India Naval Exercise (SLINEX-25). The edition was hosted by Sri Lanka between 14 and 18 August 2025. The harbour phase was conducted from 14 to 16 August at the Port of Colombo followed by the sea phase on 17 and 18 August. Two advanced offshore patrol vessels SLNS Gajabahu (P626) and SLNS Vijayabahu (P627) represented Sri Lanka. A Special Forces team of both the navies also participated in the exercise. While the 147 m-long, 300 crew-strong INS Rana is being commanded by Captain KP Sreesan, the 180.16 m-long, 200 crew-strong INS Jyoti is being commanded by Captain Chetan R Upadhyay. The Indian Naval Ships also displayed the tricolour at Colombo on the 79th Indian Independence Day on 15 August. The ships were also complemented by a Sri Lanka Air Force Bell 412 helicopter during the sea phase of the exercise.

=== 2026 ===
INS Rana participated at the International Fleet Review 2026 held at Visakapatanam.

== Essence of INS Rana ==
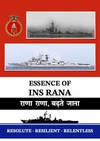
Front Cover of Book Titled "Essence of INS Rana"

A book titled Essence of INS Rana was published on 24 December 2024. The book reflects upon the glorious history of INS Rana and the significance of being associated with the ship.

== Controversy ==
On Thursday, 1 June 2017, a 21-year-old naval sailor, Vikash Yadav, of Bhind, Madhya Pradesh, an electrical mechanic of power class 1, was found dead at 5 am, with bullet injuries, on board the INS Rana in Visakhapatnam, while on duty as a security sentry. A formal inquiry was ordered by the Indian Navy and a case was registered with the Malkapuram police.
