= SLINEX =

Indian and Sri Lankan Navy exercises

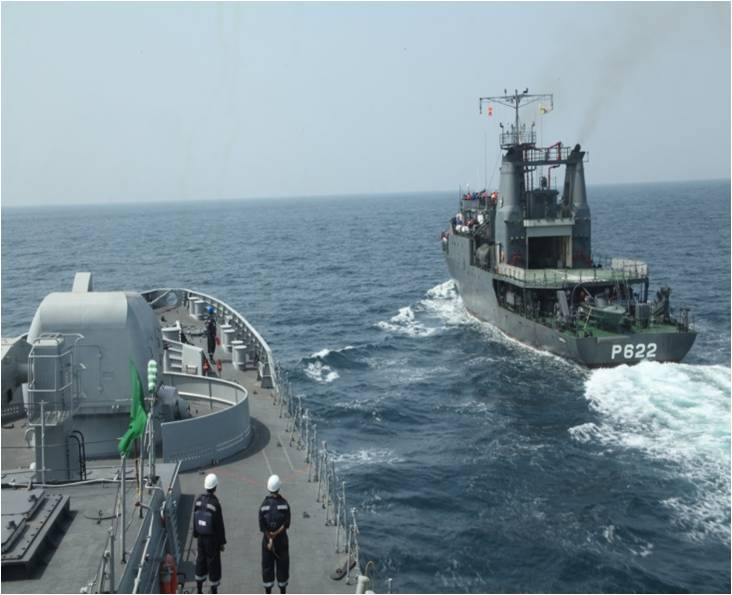
INS Talwar and SLNS Sagara during SLINEX 2013.

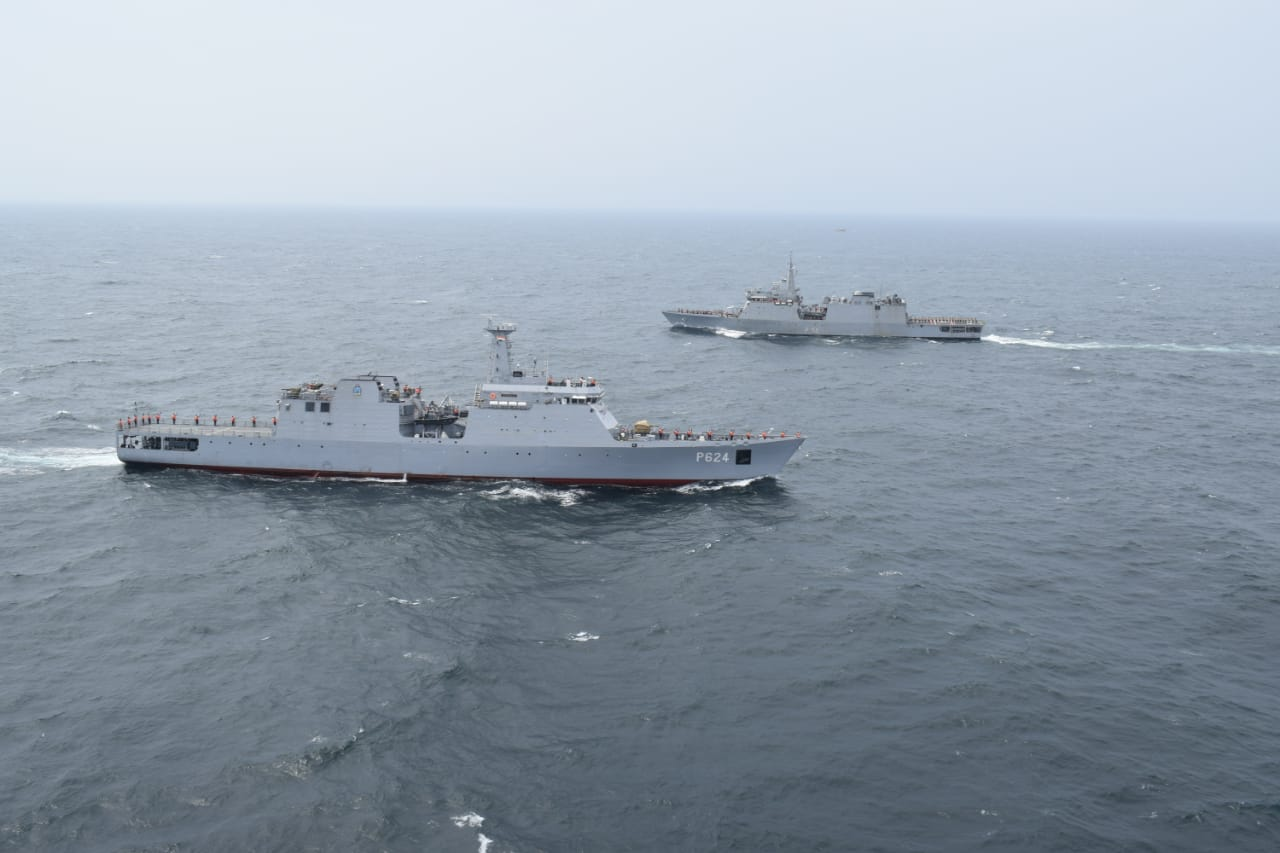
SLNS Sindurala and INS Sumedha during SLINEX 2019

SLINEX (Sri Lanka India Naval Exercise) are a series of naval exercises between the Indian Navy and the Sri Lanka Navy. The first SLINEX exercise took place in 2005. The 12th edition took place in 2025.

== SLINEX 2013 ==
SLINEX-13 was conducted off the coast of Goa from 4 to 7 November 13.

INS Talwar and SLNS Sagara participated in the exercise. The exercise was conducted over two phases with the harbour phase from 4 to 5 November 13 and the sea phase with debrief from 6 to 7 November 13.

The major activities conducted as part of the exercise were replenishment at sea approaches, visit, board, search, and seizure exercise, surface firing on a floating target, flying operations and asymmetric threat operations.

== SLINEX 2015 ==
The fourth SLINEX took place between 27 October and 15 November 2015, off Trincomalee, Sri Lanka. The vessels taking part included SLNS Sayura, SLNS Samudura, SLNS Sagara, INS Kora, INS Kirpan and INS Savitri.

== SLINEX 2018 ==
SLINEX 2018 took place between 7 and 13 September 2018, off Trincomalee, Sri Lanka. The vessels taking part included SLNS Sayurala, SLNS Samudura, SLNS Suranimala, INS Sumitra, INS Kirch and INS Cora together with two Dornier 228 aircraft and a helicopter of the Indian Navy.

== SLINEX 2020 ==
The navies of India and Sri Lanka with anti-submarine warfare corvettes INS Kamorta and INS Kiltan as well as offshore patrol vessel Sayura and training ship Gajabahu respectively begin a three-day exercise Slinex 2020 to highlight growing congruence. The eighth edition was scheduled off Trincomalee, Sri Lanka from 19 to 21 October.

== SLINEX 2024 ==
The exercise was conducted between 17 and 20 December 2024 which included the Harbour Phase (17 to 18 December) and Sea Phase (19 to 20 December). The exercise will be conducted from Visakhapatnam. Both the countries will deploy an Offshore Patrol Vessel each embarked with a Special Forces team. INS Sumitra and SLNS Sayura will take part in the exercise. The Sea Phase will include joint exercises with Special Forces operations, gun firing, communication drills, and helicopter operations among others.

== SLINEX 2025 ==
This was the 12th edition of the SLINEX and was hosted by Sri Lanka between 14 and 18 August 2025. The harbour phase was conducted from 14 to 16 August at Port of Colombo while the sea phase was held on 17 and 18 August. A Special Forces team of both the navies also participated in the exercise. The Indian Naval Ships also displayed the tricolour at Colombo on the 79th Indian Independence Day on 15 August.

The following assets participated in the exercise

- Indian Navy
  - INS Rana (D52) — guided missile destroyer with a crew of 300 commanded by Captain KP Sreesan
  - INS Jyoti (A58) — replenishment oiler with a crew of 200 commanded by Captain Chetan R Upadhyay
- Sri Lanka Navy
  - SLNS Gajabahu (P626) — advanced offshore patrol vessel
  - SLNS Vijayabahu (P627) — advanced offshore patrol vessel
- Sri Lanka Air Force
  - Bell 412 (during sea phase)

== SLINEX 2026 ==
This was the 13th edition of the SLINEX and was hosted by India between 17 and 21 September 2026. The harbour phase was conducted the Visakhapatnam Port.

The following assets participated in the exercise

- Indian Navy
  - INS Kavaratti (P31) — anti-submarine warfare corvette
  - INS Jyoti (A58) — replenishment oiler
- Sri Lanka Navy
  - SLNS Sindurala (P624) — advanced offshore patrol vessel
