= SLNS Sindurala =

Sri Lanka Navy Saryu-class patrol vessel

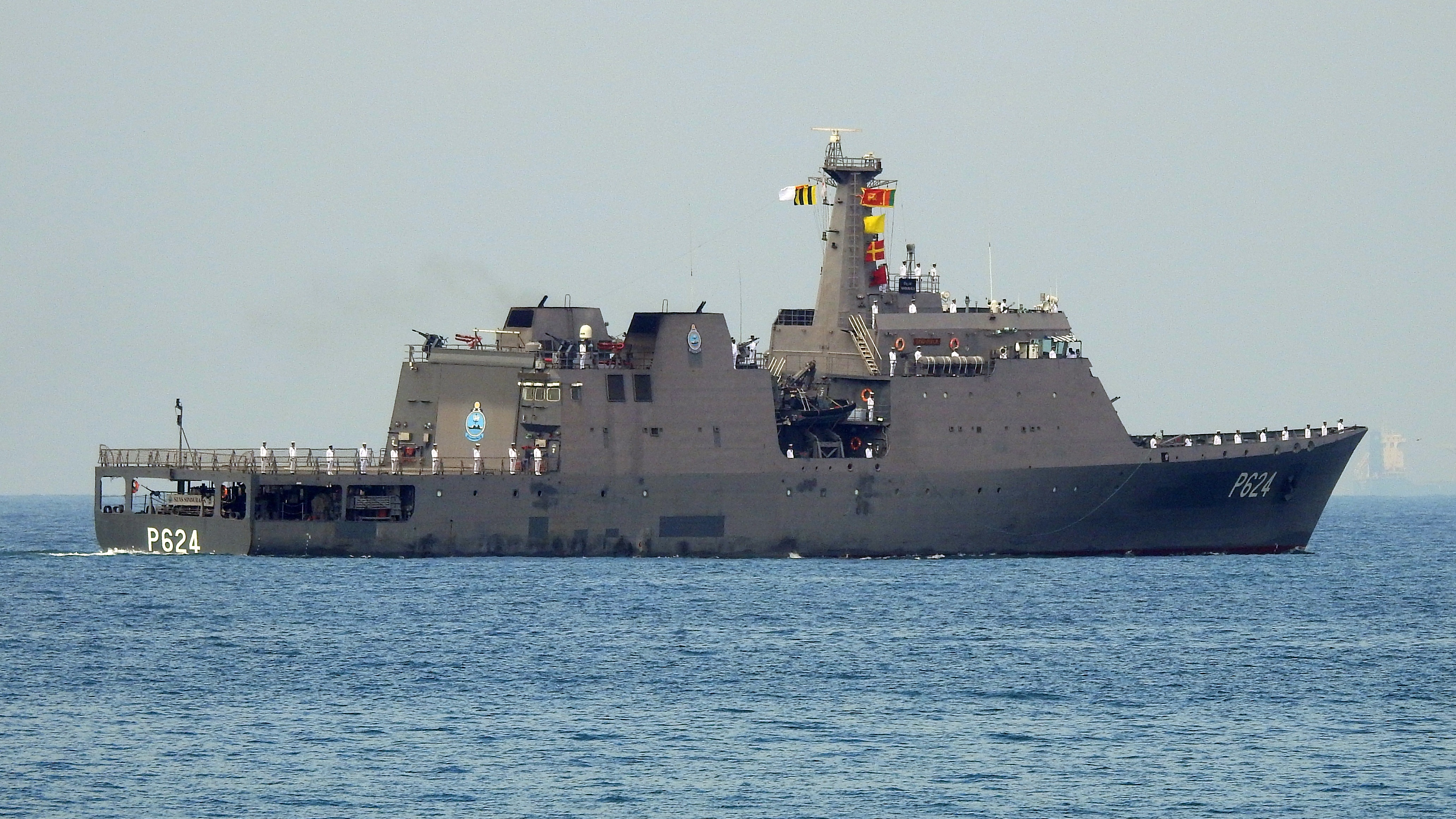
- SLNS Sindurala leaves for India to take part in SLINEX 2019

Sri Lanka
- Name: Sindurala
- Operator: Sri Lanka Navy
- Builder: Goa Shipyard
- Cost: $74 Million
- Yard number: Y 1218
- Laid down: 10 September 2014
- Launched: 11 June 2016
- Acquired: 22 March 2018
- Commissioned: 19 April 2018
- Identification: MMSI number: 417222970; Callsign: 4QRB
- Status: Active

General characteristics
- Class & type: Saryu-class patrol vessel
- Type: Advanced Offshore Patrol Vessel
- Displacement: 2,350 tons
- Length: 105.7 m (347 ft)
- Beam: 13.6 m (45 ft)
- Draught: 3.6 m
- Propulsion: 2 × MTU 20V 8000 M71 diesel engines
- Speed: 24 knots (44 km/h; 28 mph)
- Range: 7,000 nmi (13,000 km; 8,100 mi) at 15 knots (28 km/h; 17 mph)
- Complement: 127 (incl. 19 officers)
- Armament: One Type 76 twin 37 mm naval gun, two Typhoon Mk-30c equipped with the 30mm Mk44 Bushmaster II, two Type 58 14.5 mm dual AA machine guns, multiple W85 heavy machine guns, multiple Type 80 machine guns
- Aviation facilities: Landing deck and Hangar for Advanced Light Helicopter

SLNS Sindurala (Sinhala: සිඳුරළ, romanized: Sin̆durala) pennant number P624 (Sindurala, in English: Soft Waves) is an advanced offshore patrol vessel (AOPV) of the Sri Lankan Navy. It is the sister ship of SLNS Sayurala.

On February 2014 contract was signed by Government of Sri Lanka and Goa Shipyard for the two Advanced Offshore Patrol Vessels (AOPVs) for the Sri Lankan Navy and the production of the first AOPV began on 15 May 2014.

== Operations ==
After the Sri Lankan Navy received the ship, it was equipped with the Israeli Intercepting Equipment. Although the ships of the Saryu class mount a OTO Melara 76 mm gun as its main armament, the Navy decided to mount a Chinese Type 76 twin 37 mm naval gun as its main armament and two Typhoon Mk-30c equipped with the 30mm Mk44 Bushmaster II as its secondary armament in place of the AK-630 CIWS used in the Indian Navy. It was commissioned into the Navy on 19 April 2018.

As its first overseas deployment, SLNS Sindurala took part in Australian maritime exercise, KAKADU 2018 with a complement of 150 personnel, including 26 officers and 124 sailors.

Sindurala took part in Sri Lanka–India Naval Exercise (SLINEX-26) from 17 to 21 September 2026 at the Visakhapatnam Port along with INS Kavaratti (P31) and INS Jyoti (A58) of the Indian Navy.

== Gallery ==
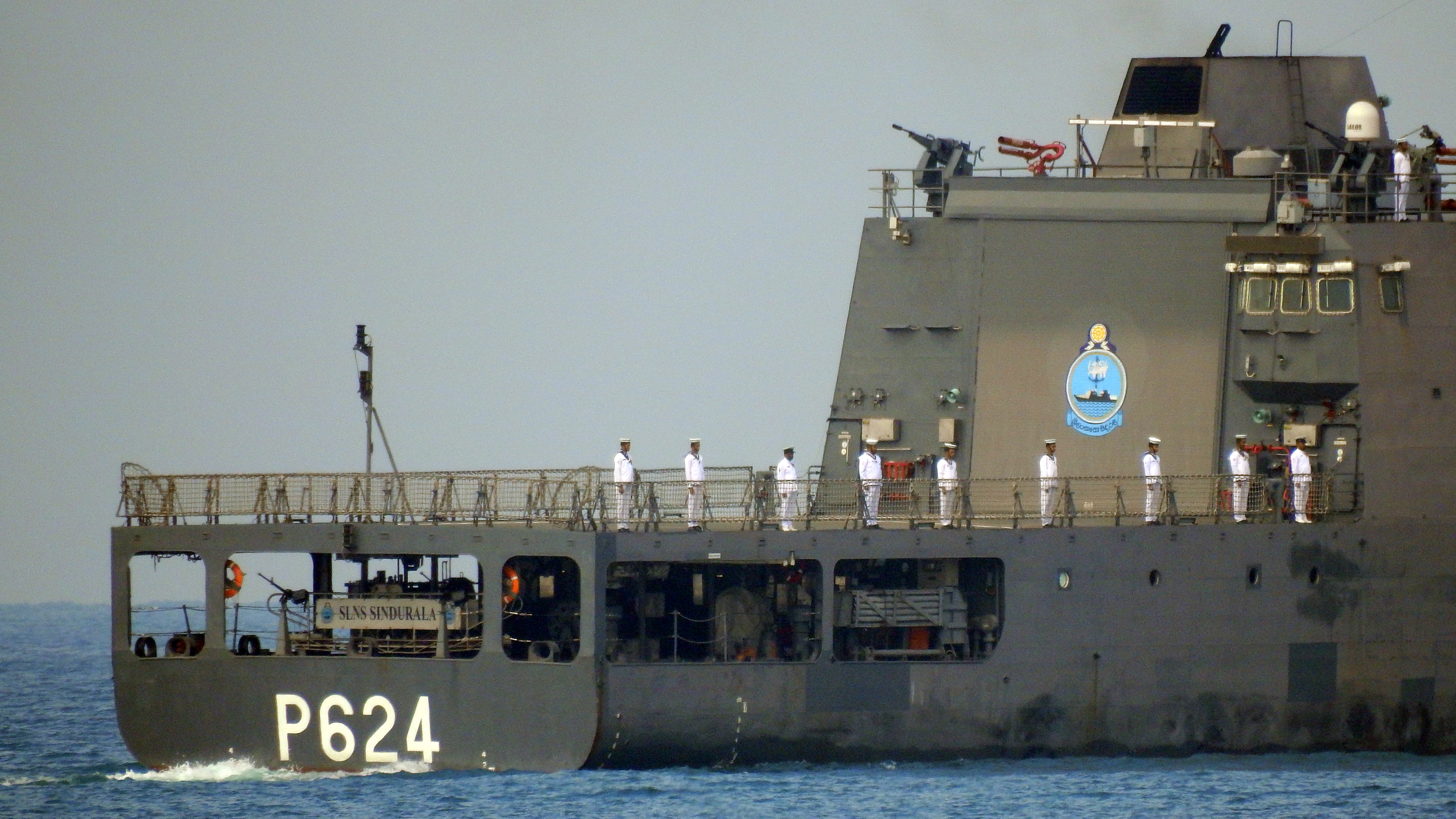
SLNS Sindurala during Independence Day parade

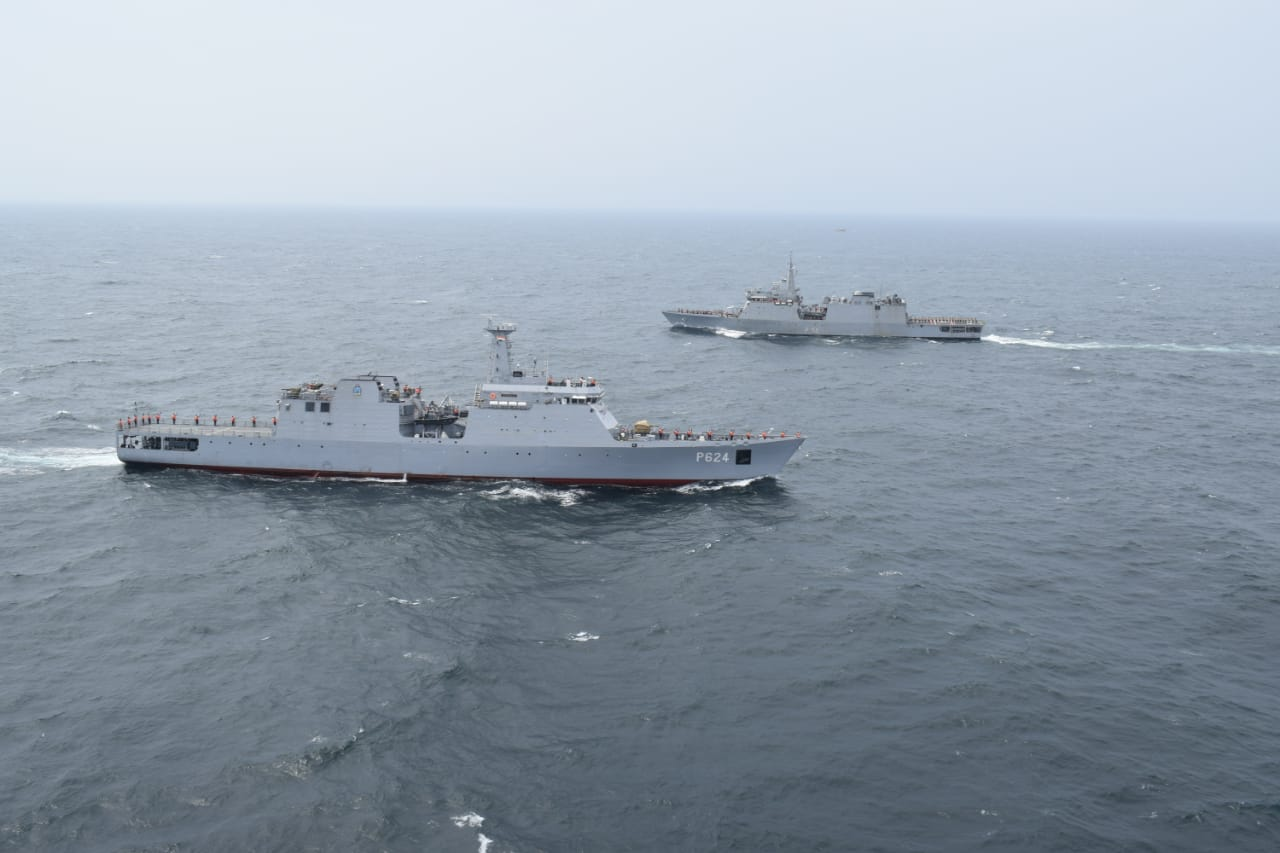
SLNS Sindurala and INS Sumedha during SLINEX 2019
