= SLNS Gajabahu =

Sri Lanka Navy Hamilton-class cutter

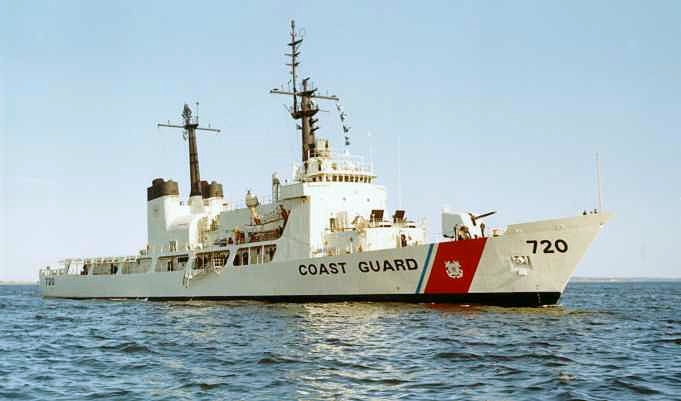
- Sherman seen in 1969

History

United States
- Name: USCGC Sherman (WHEC-720)
- Namesake: John Sherman
- Builder: Avondale Shipyards
- Laid down: January 25, 1967
- Launched: September 23, 1967
- Commissioned: September 3, 1968
- Recommissioned: July 1989
- Decommissioned: May 1986
- Home port: Honolulu, HI
- Motto: “Honorable and Faithful”
- Honors and awards: Golden Eagle award by White House Drug Czar
- Status: Active in service as of 2011
- Notes: In July 2001, Sherman became the first Coast Guard cutter to circumnavigate the world.
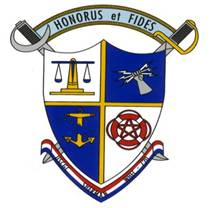
- Badge: Crest of the USCGC Sherman

Sri Lanka
- Name: SLNS Gajabahu
- Namesake: King Gajabahu I
- Operator: Sri Lanka Navy
- Acquired: 27 August 2018
- Commissioned: 6 June 2019
- Status: Active
- Identification: MMSI number: 367879000; Callsign: NMMJ

General characteristics
- Displacement: 3,250 tons
- Length: 378 ft (115 m)
- Beam: 43 ft (13 m)
- Draft: 15 ft (4.6 m)
- Propulsion: Two diesel engines; Two gas turbine engines
- Speed: 29 knots
- Range: 14,000 miles
- Endurance: 45 days
- Complement: 133 personnel (including 22 officers)
- Sensors & processing systems: AN/SPS-78 Surface Search Radar; MK 92 Fire Control System
- Armament: Otobreda 76 mm, 6 × .50 caliber machine guns; ZU-23-2

SLNS Gajabahu (P626) (Sinhala: ගජබාහු, romanized: Gajabāhu) is an Advanced Offshore Patrol Vessel of the Sri Lanka Navy. The ship is the second ship named after King Gajabahu I, the warrior king of the medieval Sri Lankan Kingdom of Anuradhapura.

Formerly, it was USCGC Sherman (WHEC-720) a United States Coast Guard Hamilton-class high endurance cutter named for John Sherman, the 32nd United States Secretary of the Treasury and author of the Sherman Antitrust Act.

== United States Coast Guard ==
Logbook USCG Sherman November 1970

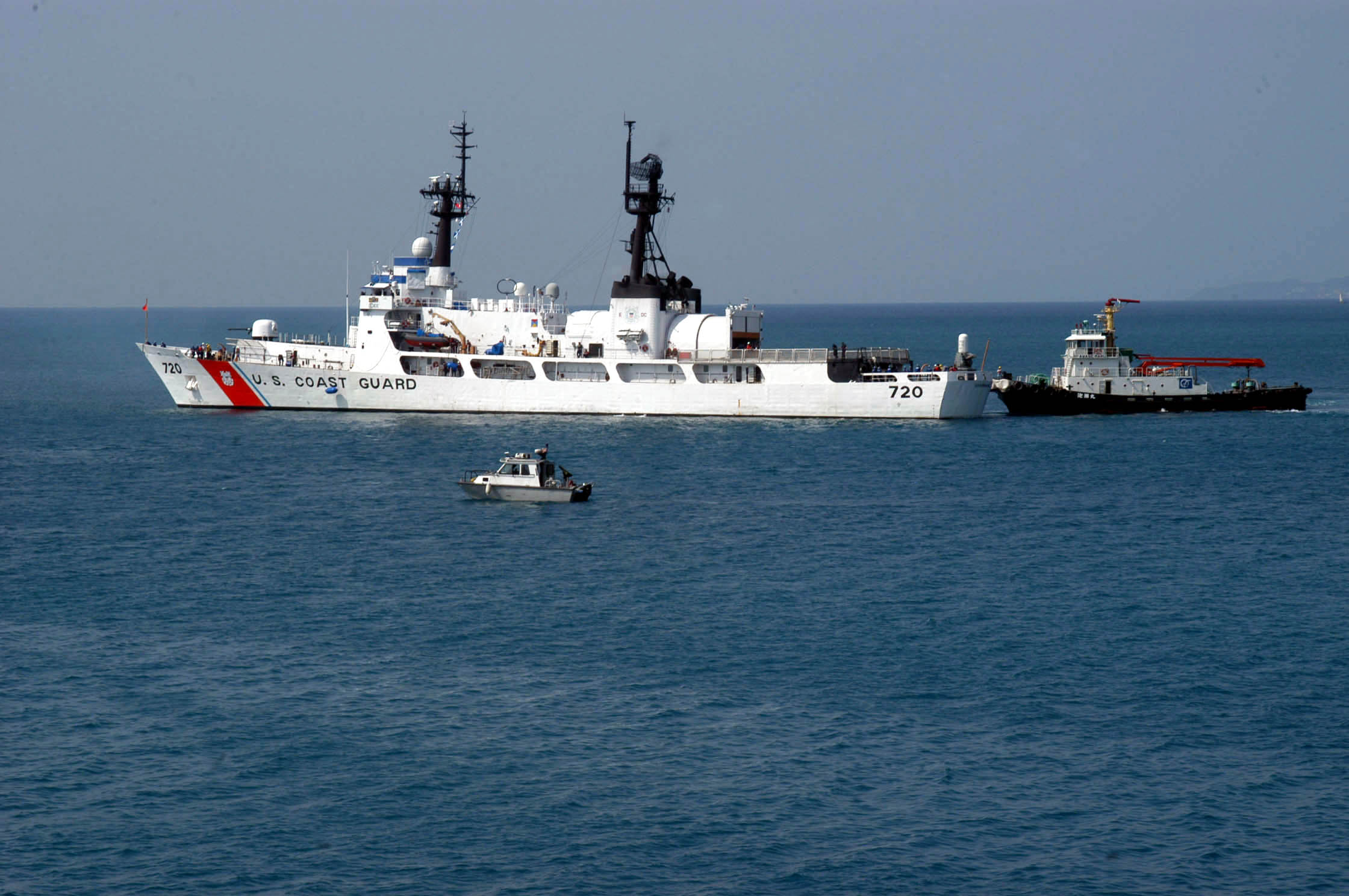
USCGC Sherman in 2006.

CGC Sherman's keel was laid on January 25, 1967 at Avondale Shipyards in New Orleans, Louisiana. She was launched on September 3, 1968.

CGC Sherman was originally homeported in Boston, Massachusetts where her primary mission was ocean station patrol in the North Atlantic.

In 1970, Sherman was assigned to Coast Guard Squadron Three in Vietnam. Her tasking during the conflict was primarily in support of Operation Market Time, which involved sorting through hundreds of small vessels off the Vietnamese coast in search of enemy weapons smugglers. Sherman's crew inspected some 900 vessels during her 10-month tour in Southeast Asia. The old 5" gun (now replaced by a 76mm mount) answered 152 calls for naval gunfire support, including a running fight on the night of 21 November 1970 which resulted in sinking the North Vietnamese armed freighter SL-3, which was carrying tons of enemy munitions.

In 1971, Sherman returned to Boston. With satellite technology reducing the need for ocean station patrols and amid concern of the rising American drug problem, the emphasis shifted to drug interdiction. In October 1976, Sherman seized the 275-foot Panamanian freighter Don Emilio and confiscated 82 tons of marijuana, the largest drug seizure in history at the time. Responding to a need for greater operational resources in the Pacific, Sherman was transferred to her next homeport in Alameda, California in May 1979. Sherman's primary missions shifted to Alaskan Patrols (ALPAT) involving fisheries law enforcement (LE), drug interdiction, search and rescue (SAR), and military readiness in the Bering Sea and Gulf of Alaska. Sherman was decommissioned from May 1986 until July 1989 to complete a three-year Fleet Renovation and Modernization (FRAM) project at Todd Shipyard in Seattle, Washington. The project upgraded Sherman's weapons, communications, aviation and other operating systems and completely renovated crew living and berthing spaces. Sherman completed ready-for-sea trials in July 1990 and once again commenced operational missions in the Pacific.

In July 2001, Sherman became the first Coast Guard cutter to circumnavigate the world, after conducting U.N. sanctions enforcement duty in the Persian Gulf and goodwill projects in Madagascar, South Africa, and Cape Verde.

Sherman was involved in search and rescue efforts following the sinking of F/V Big Valley near Saint Paul Island, Alaska, on January 15, 2005.

CGC Sherman appeared in the 2005 film Yours Mine & Ours.

In May 2006, the cutter participated with a U.S. Navy task group during a five-month deployment to Singapore, Thailand, Indonesia, Malaysia, Brunei and the Philippines. In March 2007, Sherman received worldwide attention when her boarding team discovered more than 17 metric tons of cocaine aboard the Panamanian freighter Gatun, a record seizure in the Eastern Pacific. Sherman was awarded the Golden Eagle award by the White House for combined interdiction successes during 2007.

In May 2011, Sherman was transferred to San Diego, California. Sherman continued her operations by accomplishing three drug interdiction deployments in the Eastern Pacific, a winter Alaskan patrol in the Bering Sea to enforce U.S. fisheries regulations and to provide search-and-rescue support during the Alaskan red king crab harvest, and by earning the Pacific Area Operational Readiness Award.

In May 2015, Sherman transferred her homeport to Honolulu, Hawaii.

After a final patrol in the Bering Sea, Sherman returned to Honolulu on January 23, 2018 to await decommissioning on March 29, 2018. Two new National Security Cutters will replace Sherman and the previously-retired Morgenthau in Honolulu.

== Sri Lanka Navy ==
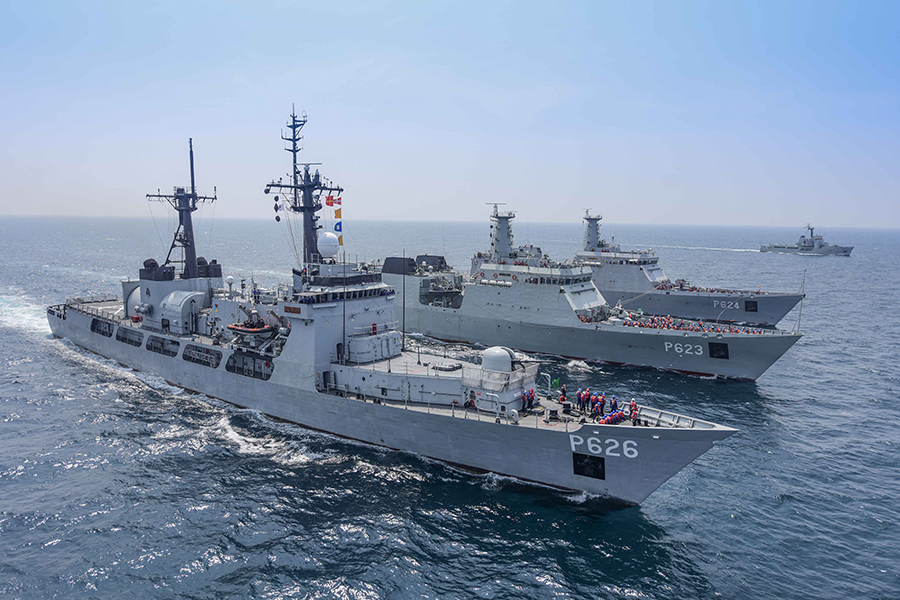
SLNS Gajabahu (P626) during Sri Lanka Navy Exercise

On 27 August 2018, at Honolulu, the ex-Sherman was transferred to the Sri Lanka Navy. Ex-Sherman was recommissioned 6 June 2019 as SLNS Gajabahu (P626). The ship is the second ship named after King Gajabahu I, the warrior king of the medieval Sri Lankan Kingdom of Anuradhapura. The ship retained its Otobreda 76 mm gun and MK 92 Fire Control System, while the Phalanx CIWS was removed and was replaced with a rear mounted dual 23mm cannon.

During the 2022 Sri Lankan protests, SLNS Gajabahu evacuated President Gotabaya Rajapaksa and his wife from Colombo, hours before the President's House was stormed and occupied by thousands of protesters on 9 July. Departing from the Colombo harbour and sailed within Sri Lankan territorial waters allowing President Rajapaksa to maintain communications while being safely out of reach of the protesters. President Rajapaksa left the island a few days later on the morning of 13 July on an Antonov An-32 military transport aircraft of the Sri Lanka Air Force to Maldives.

In 2024 March, SLNS Gajabahu deployed for Operation Prosperity Guardian during Red Sea crisis.

Between 14 August and 18 August 2025, SLNS Gajabahu along with SLNS Vijayabahu (P627) participated in the 12th edition of Sri Lanka–India Naval Exercise (SLINEX-25). The edition was hosted by Sri Lanka between 14 and 18 August 2025. The harbour phase was conducted from 14 to 16 August at the Port of Colombo followed by the sea phase on 17 and 18 August. Meanwhile, the Indian Navy was represented by a guided missile destroyer, INS Rana (D52), a replenishment oiler, INS Jyoti (A58). The Indian Navy ships arrived at the port on 14 August. A Special Forces team of both the navies also participated in the exercise. The ships were also complemented by a Sri Lanka Air Force Bell 412 helicopter during the sea phase of the exercise.

== See also ==
- SLNS Gajabahu
- SLNS Vijayabahu (P627)
- SLNS Parakramabahu (P625)
