= SLNS Sayurala (2016) =

Sri Lanka Navy Saryu-class patrol vessel

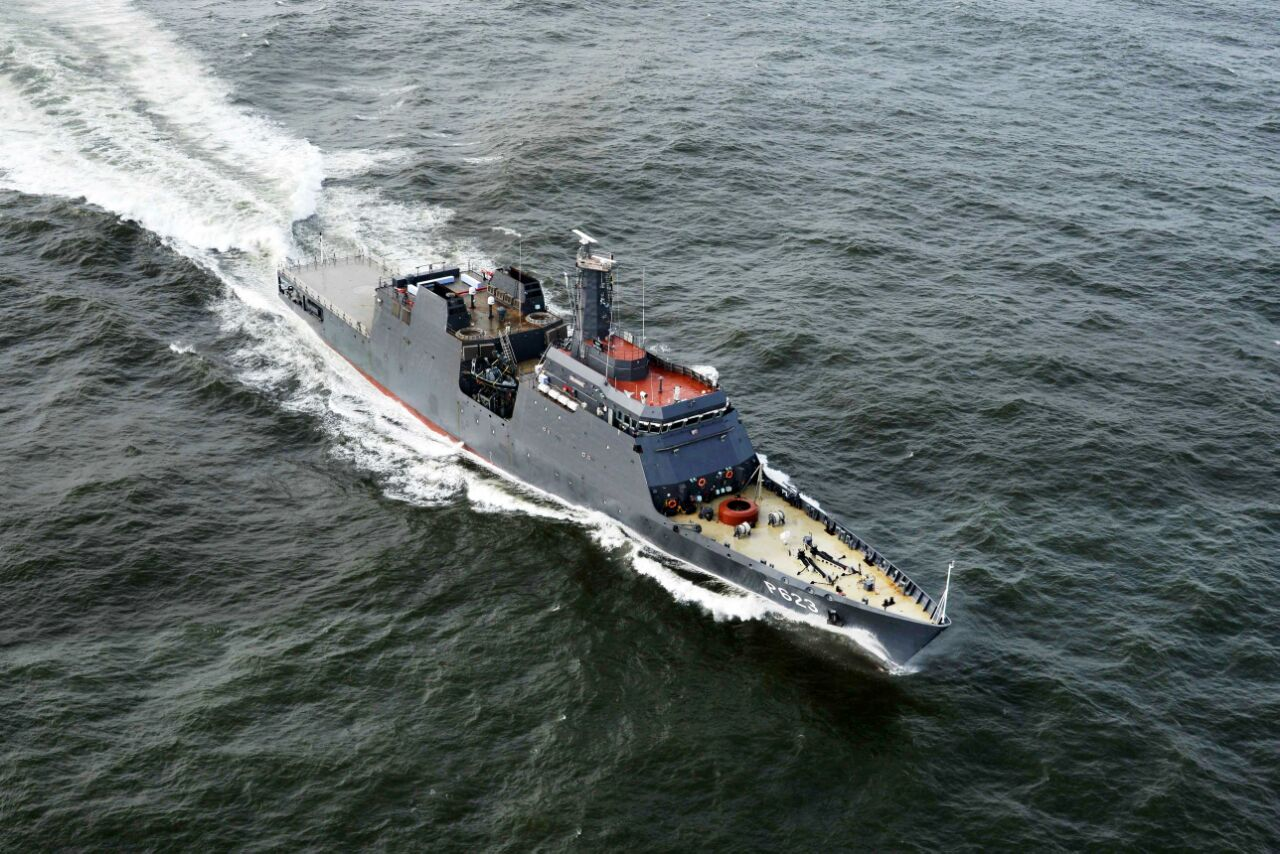
- SLNS Sayurala en-route to Colombo for delivery.

Sri Lanka
- Name: Sayurala
- Operator: Sri Lanka Navy
- Builder: Goa Shipyard
- Cost: $74 Million
- Yard number: Y 1217
- Laid down: 10 September 2014
- Launched: 11 June 2016
- Commissioned: 2 August 2017
- Maiden voyage: 26 July 2017
- In service: 02 August 2017
- Identification: MMSI number: 417222955; Callsign: 4QRI
- Status: Active

General characteristics
- Class & type: Saryu-class patrol vessel
- Type: Advanced Offshore Patrol Vessel
- Displacement: 2,350 tons
- Length: 105.7 m (347 ft)
- Beam: 13.6 m (45 ft)
- Draught: 3.6 m
- Propulsion: 2 × MTU 20V 8000 M71 diesel engines
- Speed: 24 knots (44 km/h; 28 mph)
- Range: 7,000 nmi (13,000 km; 8,100 mi) at 15 knots (28 km/h; 17 mph)
- Complement: 118 (incl 18 officers)
- Armament: DS30 30mm dual gun, Rheinmetall Mk 20 RH-202, Type 63 multiple rocket launcher, Heckler & Koch GMG Automatic Grenade Launcher, W85 heavy machine gun, Type 80 machine gun,
- Aviation facilities: Landing deck and Hangar for Advanced Light Helicopter

SLNS Sayurala (Sinhala: සයුරළ, romanized: sayuraḷa, lit. 'Sea waves') pennant number P623 is the flagship and an advanced offshore patrol vessel (AOPV) of the Sri Lanka Navy. It is the sister ship of SLNS Sindurala.

In February 2014 contract was signed by Government of Sri Lanka and Goa Shipyard for the two Advanced Offshore Patrol Vessels (AOPVs) for the Sri Lanka Navy and the production of the first AOPV began on 15 May 2014. The Keel of the vessel was laid on 10 September 2014 and was ceremonially launched on 10 June 2016.

== Operations ==
After the Sri Lanka Navy received the ship, it has been equipped with the Israeli Intercepting Equipment.

As its first deployment Sayurala took part in Southeast Asian Nations (ASEAN) International Fleet Review 2017 in Thailand. This is the longest foreign tour (21 days) an SLN Ship undertook after the year 1965 with 127 sailors including 18 officers.

In 2018, Sayurala took part SLINEX 2018 together with SLNS Samudura, SLNS Suranimala, INS Sumitra.

In February, 2019 Sayurala took part Aman Naval Exercise in Karachi, Pakistan and International Defense Exhibition in Abu Dhabi.

== Commanding Officers ==
The first Sri Lankan Navy officer to Captain the ship was Captain Nishantha Amarosa.

The present commanding officer is Capt(ASW) N.A.C.C Munasinghe psc

== Gallery ==
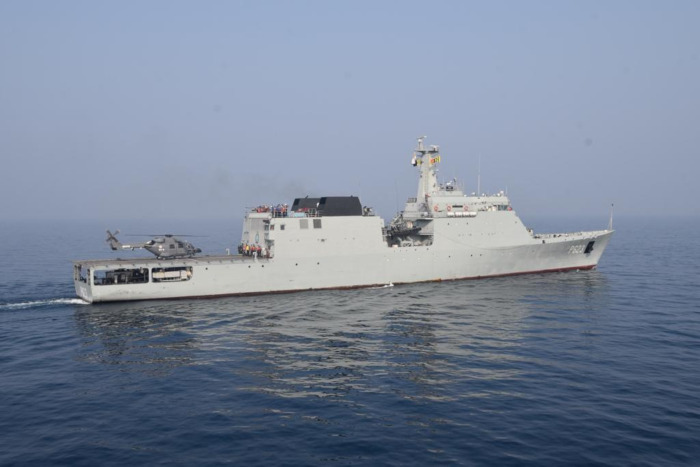
Sayurala during SLINEX 2022

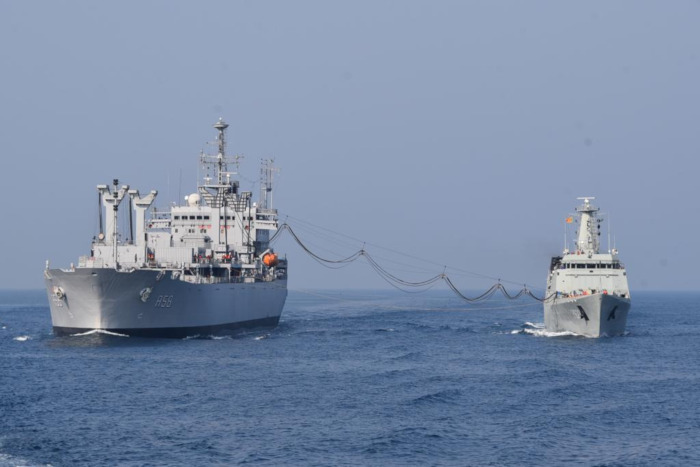
INS Jyoti (A58) replenishes Sayurala
