= Goa Shipyard =

Indian ship building company

Goa Shipyard Limited
- Type: Public sector undertaking
- Industry: Defence ship building
- Founded: 1957 as Estaleiros Navais de Goa
- Headquarters: Vasco da Gama, Goa
- Key people: Brajesh Kumar Upadhyay (chairman & MD)
- Products: Frigates; Offshore patrol vessels Patrol boat Berthing pontoon Tugboat; Pollution control vessel Fast attack craft Survey vessel Powership
- Revenue: ▲₹4,004.41 crore (US$430 million) (2026)
- Operating income: ▲₹442.28 crore (US$47 million) (2026)
- Net income: ▲₹331.45 crore (US$35 million) (2026)
- Total assets: ▼₹6,786.31 crore (US$720 million) (2026)
- Total equity: ▲₹1,936.13 crore (US$210 million) (2026)
- Number of employees: ▼1381 (2026)
- Website: Goa Shipyard

Goa Shipyard Limited (GSL) is a public sector undertaking for defence ship building located on the West Coast of India at Vasco da Gama, Goa. It was established in 1957, originally by the colonial government of the Portuguese in India as the "Estaleiros Navais de Goa", to build barges to be used in Goa's growing mining industry, which took off after the establishment of India's blockade of Goa in 1955. In the wake of Portugal's defeat and unconditional surrender to India following the 1961 Indian annexation of Goa, it was requisitioned to manufacture warships for the Indian Navy and the Indian Coast Guard.

GSL is undergoing a modernisation of its yard to adapt to the latest technology in shipbuilding. To this purpose it is negotiating with well-known shipbuilders for an arrangement to collaborate. To date it has built 167 vessels, including barges, tugs, landing craft, offshore patrol vessels and other vessels for the Indian Navy and Coast Guard and for export to countries like Yemen. Goa Shipyard unlike Cochin Shipyard and Hindustan Shipyard cannot manufacture big vessels of capacity above 15,000 DWT, the average Deadweight Tonnage (DWT) capacity of a ship worldwide is around 60,000 to 80,000 DWT.

A new slipway has been commissioned to take up major repair jobs of ships in the dry dock area. A damage control simulator and two double boom level luffing cranes for heavy lifting have been constructed.

== Military ships built ==
GSL has built the following ships for military use:

=== Landing craft Mark II ===
- L34 – 28 January 1980
- L33 – 1 December 1980
- L35 – 11 December 1983
- L36 – 18 July 1986
- L37 – 18 October 1986
- L38 – 10 December 1986
- L39 – 25 March 1987

=== Saryu class offshore patrol vessel ===
- INS Saryu (P54)
- INS Sunayna (P58)
- SLNS Sayurala (P623)
- SLNS Sindurala (P624)

=== Vikram class offshore patrol vessel ===
- CGS Varad (40) – 19 July 1990
- CGS Varaha (41) – 19 July 1990

=== Samar class offshore patrol vessel ===
- CGS Samar (42) – 14 February 1996
- CGS Sangram (43) – 29 March 1997
- CGS Sarang (44) – 21 June 1999
- CGS Sagar (45) – 3 November 2003

=== Tarantul I class missile corvette (Veer class) ===
- INS Vinash (K47) – 20 November 1993
- INS Vidyut (K48) – 16 January 1995
- INS Prahar (K98) – 1 March 1997 Lost at sea on 22 April 2006
- INS Pralaya (K91) – 18 December 2002

=== Sarojini Naidu class extra fast patrol vessel ===
- CGS Sarojini Naidu (229) – 11 November 2002
- CGS Durgabai Deshmukh (230) – 29 April 2003
- CGS Kasturba Gandhi (231) – 28 October 2005
- CGS Aruna Asaf Ali (232) – 28 January 2006
- CGS Subhadra Kumari Chauhan (233) – 28 April 2006

=== Samarth-class offshore patrol vessel ===
- ICGS Samarth – 10 November 2015
- ICGS Shoor – 11 April 2016
- ICGS Sarathi – 9 September 2016
- ICGS Shaunak – 21 February 2017
- ICGS Shaurya – 12 August 2017
- ICGS Sujay – 21 December 2017
- ICGS Sachet – 15 May 2020
- ICGS Sujeet – 15 December 2020
- ICGS Sajag – 10 November 2015
- ICGS Sarthak – 28 October 2021
- ICGS Saksham – 16 March 2022

=== GSL-class pollution control vessel ===
- ICGS Samudra Pratap

=== Sailing vessels ===
In 1997, GSL built the three-masted barque INS Tarangini for use as a sail training ship for the Indian Navy.A sister ship, INS Sudarshini was also built in 2011. Both ships are based with the Southern Naval Command in Kochi.

== Future ships ==
GSL has been nominated to build the following class of ships for the Indian Navy and Coast Guard:

=== Talwar-class frigates ===
GSL is building two Talwar-class frigates in collaboration with Russia's United Ship Building. The two vessels were launched in July 2024 and March 2025, respectively. The first is expected to be delivered in 2026.

=== Fast patrol boats for Indian Army ===
GSL has bagged an order of Rs.65 crore from Indian Army to build 12 fast patrol boats for the surveillance and patrolling at large water bodies. The first vessel was expected to be delivered by July 2021.

=== Floating dry dock ===
A 4,000 ton floating dock constructed by Goa Shipyard was acquired by the Sri Lanka Navy as part of a grant from India, to facilitate repair and maintenance of larger fleet units based at Trincomalee instead of having to depend dry dock facilities in Colombo. The dock is classified by the Indian Register of Shipping which is the first defence-export project for the classification society. It was launched on 19 February 2026.

== Other products ==
- Tugboat
- Surface effect ships
- Hovercraft
- High-speed aluminium-hulled vessels
- Pollution control vessels
- Advanced deep sea commercial trawlers
- Fish factory vessels, catamarans
- Ferry

== See also ==
- Cochin Shipyard
- Garden Reach Shipbuilders and Engineers
- Hindustan Shipyard
- Mazagon Dock Limited
