= List of shipwrecks in 2023 =

The list of shipwrecks in 2023 includes ships sunk, foundered, grounded, or otherwise lost during 2023.

table of contents
2023
Jan	Feb	Mar	Apr
May	Jun	Jul	Aug
Sep	Oct	Nov	Dec

== January ==
=== 3 January ===
List of shipwrecks: 3 January 2023
Ship	State	Description
Long Shun	Mongolia	The cargo ship foundered off the Matsu Islands, Taiwan. One of her five crew was rescued; the others were reported missing.
Michigan	United States	The towing vessel flooded and sank at Milwaukee, Wisconsin after sitting idle since April 2022.

=== 4 January ===
List of shipwrecks: 4 January 2023
Ship	State	Description
Kebo Iwa Express	Indonesia	The ferry sank off Sanur, Bali. All 29 people on board were rescued.

=== 7 January ===
List of shipwrecks: 7 January 2023
Ship	State	Description
PL Arthena	Thailand	The tugboat sank in Gulf of Thailand some 10–12 nautical miles (19–22 km; 12–14 mi) off Koh Phangan Island, near Samui Island, Surat Thani Province, Thailand in rough weather. Nine crew went into life rafts and were picked up by the nearby tanker Namapapa (Thailand).

=== 10 January ===
List of shipwrecks: 10 January 2023
Ship	State	Description
Hong Pu 6	China	The tanker broke in two in the Yellow Sea (35°22′N 120°44′E) after an explosion. The forward section possibly sank. Fifteen crew were rescued and two were reported missing.
JS Inazuma	Japan Maritime Self-Defense Force	The Murasame-class destroyer hit an underwater rock off Suō-Ōshima, Yamaguchi Prefecture in Seto Inland Sea in the midday, causing an oil spill and disabled her propulsion and steering. The destroyer immediately dropped anchor afterwards. Reportedly none of the crew suffered injury.

=== 15 January ===
List of shipwrecks: 15 January 2023
Ship	State	Description
Manta	United States	The 180-foot (55 m) retired oil and gas research vessel was sunk as an artificial reef in 100 feet (30 m) of water 16 miles (26 km) south of Destin, Florida in the Gulf of Mexico (30°08′N 86°39′W).

=== 16 January ===
List of shipwrecks: 16 January 2023
Ship	State	Description
Hao Feng	China	The cargo ship sprang a leak, capsized and sank in the Taiwan Strait 90 nautical miles (170 km; 100 mi) west of Kaohsiung. The crew were rescued.
WB Wood	United States	The 135-foot (41 m), 134-ton non self-propelled dredging vessel capsized and partially sank near Mile Marker 85 in the Mississippi River (29°54′N 89°55′W) 10 miles (16 km) below New Orleans, Louisiana. The tugboat Omaha rescued the only crewman onboard. WB Wood was recovered on 28 January and placed on a barge for examination. She was declared a total loss.

=== 18 January ===
List of shipwrecks: 18 January 2023
Ship	State	Description
Echigo	Japan Coast Guard	The Tsugaru-class patrol vessel ran aground on, or struck a reef off Kashiwazaki, Niigata Prefecture, Honshu, in the Sea of Japan. Later anchored.

=== 19 January ===
List of shipwrecks: 19 January 2023
Ship	State	Description
Sea Voyager	Tanzania	The tugboat sank in the Caribbean Sea some 50 nautical miles (93 km; 58 mi) west of Cartagena, Colombia. Five of the crew were rescued, four reported missing.

=== 20 January ===
List of shipwrecks: 20 January 2023
Ship	State	Description
LCT Regency 101	Philippines	The tank landing craft went ashore in rough weather in southern Luzon. The crew was safe.

=== 22 January ===
List of shipwrecks: 22 January 2023
Ship	State	Description
Mark E. Kuebler	United States	The tugboat ran aground, or was beached, in the Corpus Christi, Texas Channel after reportedly in a collision with the VLCC tanker Nisalah (Saudi Arabia).

=== 24 January ===
List of shipwrecks: 24 January 2023
Ship	State	Description
Anil	Tanzania	The container ship capsized and sank on her port side at dock at Asaluyeh, Iran. The crew was safe.
Tuzla	Turkey	Russian invasion of Ukraine: The cargo ship was severely damaged by Russian shelling while in port at Kherson.
Xin Hai Zhou 2	Panama	The bulk carrier drifted aground between Ishigaki Island and Kohama Island, Okinawa after becoming disabled. The crew were evacuated by Japanese Coast Guard helicopter.

=== 25 January ===
List of shipwrecks: 25 January 2023
Ship	State	Description
Jin Tian	Hong Kong	The cargo ship capsized and sank some 75 nautical miles (139 km; 86 mi) south of Jeju Island, South Korea, 110 kilometres (68 mi) west of the Danjo Islands in the East China Sea in rough weather. Thirteen crew were rescued, five by commercial vessels cruising nearby, two by Japan Air Self-Defense Force helicopters and six by the South Korean maritime police. Nine crew were reported missing.

=== 26 January ===
List of shipwrecks: 26 January 2023
Ship	State	Description
Hoang Gia 46	Vietnam	The cargo ship struck a reef off Quảng Ngãi Province, Vietnam, and suffered a hull breach with ensuing water ingress. The ship was disabled, drifted ashore and grounded on the beach. The crew were safe.

=== 28 January ===
List of shipwrecks: 28 January 2023
Ship	State	Description
Wan Hai 272	Singapore	The container ship collided with the container ship Santa Loukia (Malta) off Bangkok, Thailand and ran aground or was beached. Still aground as of 3 February.

=== 31 January ===
List of shipwrecks: 31 January 2023
Ship	State	Description
MSC Faith	Liberia	The container ship ran aground in the Singapore Strait and was floated off afterward.

== February ==
=== 3 February ===
List of shipwrecks: 3 February 2023
Ship	State	Description
São Paulo	Brazilian Navy	The decommissioned Clemenceau-class aircraft carrier was scuttled in the Atlantic Ocean some 350 kilometres (190 nmi; 220 mi) off the coast in 5,000 metres (16,400 ft) of water.

=== 4 February ===
List of shipwrecks: 4 February 2023
Ship	State	Description
Anemos	Panama	The general cargo ship ran aground at Pulau Karangjamuang while approaching Surabaya, Indonesia. The vessel was still aground as of 10 February.

=== 5 February ===
List of shipwrecks: 5 February 2023
Ship	State	Description
TQ Ordu	Turkey	The bulk carrier ran aground near Istanbul, Turkey.

=== 11 February ===
List of shipwrecks: 11 February 2023
Ship	State	Description
My Princess	Comoros	The general cargo ship reportedly sank at Sharjah, United Arab Emirates, in the Persian Gulf.

=== 16 February ===
List of shipwrecks: 16 February 2023
Ship	State	Description
Antoineta	Cameroon	The cargo ship listed and sank in shallow water, mostly above water, at/near Libreville, Gabon. The crew was safe.

=== 18 February ===
List of shipwrecks: 18 February 2023
Ship	State	Description
Livana	Cameroon	The general cargo ship drifted onto a breakwater, at Marina Smir, Morocco, in the Strait of Gibraltar after a breakdown. One crew member was reported missing.

=== 19 February ===
List of shipwrecks: 19 February 2023
Ship	State	Description
Nakoa	United States	The 94-foot (29 m) yacht ran aground on a reef off Maui, Hawaii. She was pulled off and scuttled in 800 feet (240 m) of water on 5 March.

=== 20 February ===
List of shipwrecks: 20 February 2023
Ship	State	Description
Lien Sheng Fa	Taiwan	The fishing trawler Lien Sheng Fa went missing during Cyclone Freddy hundreds of kilometres northeast of Mauritius around 4:00 a.m. on 20 February. The vessel was found capsized on 23 February with its crew of 16 missing.

=== 21 February ===
List of shipwrecks: 21 February 2023
Ship	State	Description
Nazmehr	Iran	The general cargo ship ran aground in the Caspian Sea and was still aground as of 26 February.
Seamark	Comoros	The general cargo ship broke in two and sank at Novorossiysk, Russia.
Tiyam	Iran	The general cargo ship ran aground while trying to assist Nazmehr and was still aground as of 26 February.

=== 22 February ===
List of shipwrecks: x February 2023
Ship	State	Description
Escape	Netherlands	The container ship caught fire in the Gulf of Riga and was abandoned. Her fifteen crew were rescued by Kairit (Malta).

=== 23 February ===
List of shipwrecks: 23 February 2023
Ship	State	Description
Yong Xing 56	China	The bulk carrier was holed by ice while at anchor in the Tatar Strait south of Vanino, Khabarovsk Krai. The ship sank on 1 March in 253 metres (830 ft) of water.

=== 28 February ===
List of shipwrecks: 28 February 2023
Ship	State	Description
Linggar Petak 89	Indonesia	The longline fishing vessel capsized and sank in the Indian Ocean 30–35 miles (48–56 km) off Bali in stormy weather. Four crew were rescued, one was found dead, and ten were reported missing.
Princess Empress	Philippines	The tanker sank in 1,300 feet (400 m) of water off the northeast coast of Mindoro, Philippines, in rough weather. The ship's crew was rescued by Efes (Panama).

== March ==
=== 9 March ===
List of shipwrecks: 9 March 2023
Ship	State	Description
Esther Miracle	Gabon	The ferry sank along the coast of Gabon after she left Libreville, bound for Port-Gentil carrying 151 passengers and crew. Two people were killed, 121 were rescued, and 28 people were reported missing.

=== 11 March ===
List of shipwrecks: 11 March 2023
Ship	State	Description
Tuan Tu 09	Vietnam	The cargo ship sank in rough weather between Vũng Tàu and Phu Quy Island. Five people were rescued, and two were reported missing.

=== 13 March ===
List of shipwrecks: 13 March 2023
Ship	State	Description
Raindancer	United States	During a voyage from the Galapagos Islands to the Marquesas Islands in French Polynesia, the 44-foot (13 m) sailboat sank in the Pacific Ocean about 1,000 nautical miles (1,900 km; 1,200 mi) from the Bay of Virgins (Hana Vave) on Fatu-Hiva 15 minutes after colliding with a whale. All four people on board were uninjured and abandoned ship in a liferaft and a dinghy. The catamaran Rolling Stones (United States) rescued them 10 hours later after they had drifted 9 nautical miles (17 km; 10 mi).

=== 15 March ===
List of shipwrecks: 15 March 2023
Ship	State	Description
Dolphin	United States	The 190-foot (58 m) retired oil and gas research vessel was sunk as an artificial reef in 200 feet (61 m) of water 16 nautical miles (30 km; 18 mi) south of Destin, Florida in the Gulf of Mexico (30°07′N 86°24′W).

=== 20 March ===
List of shipwrecks: 20 March 2023
Ship	State	Description
Unknown tugboat	United States	A derelict tugboat sank at dock at Salmon Bay, Seattle, Washington.

=== 21 March ===
List of shipwrecks: 21 March 2023
Ship	State	Description
Unknown fishing vessel	Thailand	A fishing vessel was sunk in a collision with the tanker Ocean Marine (Thailand) in the Gulf of Siam 33 nautical miles (61 km; 38 mi) north west of Koh Samui, Thailand. Three people were rescued, one dead, and one was reported missing.

=== 22 March ===
List of shipwrecks: 22 March 2023
Ship	State	Description
Petrel	Isle of Man	The research vessel heeled over in a dry dock at Leith, Lothian, United Kingdom. Twenty-five people were injured. The ship was righted then refloated by 4 May 2023.

=== 23 March ===
List of shipwrecks: 23 March 2023
Ship	State	Description
Noorderlicht	Netherlands	The schooner ran aground off Rugholmen, Norway. Twenty-four of the 26 people on board were rescued; her captain and mate remained aboard to await the assistance of a tug. There was no damage done to the schooner with an ice strengthened hull.

=== 26 March ===
List of shipwrecks: 26 March 2023
Ship	State	Description
Herca 1	Panama	The cargo ship ran aground on Turneffe Atoll reefs, eight nautical miles (15 km; 9.2 mi) due east of Belize City, Belize, in the Caribbean Sea. Still aground as of 28 March.

=== 27 March ===
List of shipwrecks: 27 March 2023
Ship	State	Description
Silver Whale	Russia (probably not flagged)	The floating restaurant sank in the Neva River in St. Petersburg, Russia after springing leaks, probably from ice floes.

=== 29 March ===
List of shipwrecks: 29 March 2023
Ship	State	Description
Lady Mary Joy 3	Philippines	The ferry caught fire and was abandoned off Basilan Provence. She was towed to the coast of Basilan and beached. 31 people were killed. Survivors were rescued by the coast guard, navy, another ferry and local fishermen.

=== 31 March ===
List of shipwrecks: 31 March 2023
Ship	State	Description
Sea Cypress	United States	The 71-foot (22 m) tugboat capsized in Sabine Pass, Gulf of Mexico. The crew were rescued.

== April ==
=== 1 April ===
List of shipwrecks: 1 April 2023
Ship	State	Description
KM Labitra Karina	Indonesia	The anchored ferry was damaged in a collision with KM Mabuhay Nusanta (Indonesia) in the Port of Merak anchorage, Java, in the Sunda Strait and was beached to prevent sinking.

=== 3 April ===
List of shipwrecks: 3 April 2023
Ship	State	Description
Batiwakkal Permai	Indonesia	The tank landing craft sprung a leak in rough weather and sank in the Celebes Sea in the Sitaro Islands Regency off North Sulawesi. Nine survivors were rescued on 8 April from a raft by the fishing vessel Mentari 888 (Indonesia) off Morotai 160 nautical miles (300 km; 180 mi) from the site of the sinking. Two crew were reported missing.

=== 5 April ===
List of shipwrecks: 5 April 2023
Ship	State	Description
Joe 2	Guinea Bissau	The cargo ship sank in the Mediterranean Sea off Kumluca, Antalya Province, northwest coast of Cyprus. Five crew were rescued and nine reported missing.

=== 14 April ===
List of shipwrecks: 14 April 2023
Ship	State	Description
Cosmina 1	Romania	The anchored inland cargo ship was damaged when struck by the livestock carrier Mina (flag unknown) and had to be run aground to avoid sinking off Reni, Ukraine, in the Danube River.

=== 15 April ===
List of shipwrecks: 15 April 2023
Ship	State	Description
Walla Walla	United States	The Jumbo-class ferry ran aground in Rich Passage near Bainbridge Island, Washington, after a generator failure. No injuries or hull damage were reported; passengers were loaded onto Kitsap Fast Ferries to return to Bremerton, Washington. Refloated that night. The ferry returned to its route 3 May 2023.

=== 16 April ===
List of shipwrecks: 16 April 2023
Ship	State	Description
Raja 10	Mongolia	The ferry listed at dock settling on the dock and the bottom at Surat Thani port, Surat Thani Province, Thailand, in the Gulf of Siam.

=== 18 April ===
List of shipwrecks: 18 April 2023
Ship	State	Description
RMS Cyclops	United States	The retired 102-foot (31 m) offshore supply vessel was sunk as an artificial reef eight miles (13 km) south of East Pass, Destin, Florida (30°20′N 86°26′W).
Wilson Skaw	Barbados	The cargo ship ran aground north of Hvammstangi, northwest coast of Iceland. The vessel's hull was breached.
Zhe Hai 168	China	The bulk carrier ran aground off the southeast coast of Samar, Philippines. Salvage operations began on 22 April. The vessel was still aground as of 26 April.

=== 20 April ===
List of shipwrecks: 20 April 2023
Ship	State	Description
Filipinas Cebu	Philippines	The ferry ran aground off Ozamiz City, Misamis Occidental, Philippines. 85 passengers were taken off. The vessel was still aground as of 25 April.

=== 23 April ===
List of shipwrecks: 23 April 2023
Ship	State	Description
Indian Partnership	United Kingdom	The bulk carrier ran aground on a reef off Misool Island, Raja Ampat Regency, Southwest Papua, New Guinea, Indonesia in the Ceram Sea and rested on the bottom.

=== 24 April ===
List of shipwrecks: 24 April 2023
Ship	State	Description
Petra L.	Antigua and Barbuda	The cargo ship collided with a wind turbine in the Gode Wind Farm, in the North Sea north west of Norderney, Germany and was severely damaged. She was on a voyage from a Polish port to Merksem, Belgium. She put in to Emden, Germany.

=== 25 April ===
List of shipwrecks: 25 April 2023
Ship	State	Description
Carlton Queen	Egypt	The 36-or-42-or-45-metre (118 ft 1 in or 137 ft 10 in or 147 ft 8 in) (depending on source) dive yacht sank in the Red Sea between Shaʽb Abu Nuħas Reef, Hurghada, Egypt, and the Sinai Peninsula on her second voyage.

=== 28 April ===
List of shipwrecks: 28 April 2023
Ship	State	Description
Diamond Highway	Panama	The former car carrier caught fire while being scrapped at Cebu, the Philippines.
Hong Hai 189	Sierra Leone	The vessel, possibly a cargo ship or dredge, capsized and sank in shallow water with her bottom above water after a collision with the tanker Petite Soeur (Marshall Islands) off Corregidor, in Manila Bay, Luzon, the Philippines. 16 people were rescued, 1 person was killed, and 3 were reported missing.

=== 29 April ===
List of shipwrecks: 29 April 2023
Ship	State	Description
Pentalina	United Kingdom	The ferry ran aground near a pier at St. Margaret's Hope, Orkney Islands, off the north coast of Scotland after a fire broke out in her engine room. All passengers were evacuated. The vessel was still aground on 30 April. The ferry returned to service just over six weeks later.

== May ==
=== 1 May ===
List of shipwrecks: 1 May 2023
Ship	State	Description
Pablo	Gabon	The tanker caught fire off Singapore. Twenty-five of her 28 crew were rescued, three were reported missing. She was on a voyage from a port in China to the United Arab Emirates.

=== 2 May ===
List of shipwrecks: 2 May 2023
Ship	State	Description
Alpha Optimism	Malta	The bulk carrier caught fire at A Coruña, Spain. The fire was extinguished. The ship returned to service and was travelling between ports in Malaysia, Vietnam and Indonesia in August and September 2023.

=== 7 May ===
List of shipwrecks: 7 May 2023
Ship	State	Description
Atlantic	India	2023 Tanur boat disaster: The tourist boat capsized in a river at Tanur, India. At least 22 people were killed. The boat was later hauled out of the river.

=== 10 May ===
List of shipwrecks: 10 May 2023
Ship	State	Description
True Conrad	Liberia	The bulk carrier ran aground between the islets Grande and Marambala, Itaguaí, Brazil. The vessel was still aground as of 17 May.

=== 16 May ===
List of shipwrecks: 16 May 2023
Ship	State	Description
Lu Peng Yuan Yu 028	China	Lu Peng Yuan Yu sinking: The longliner fishing vessel capsized in the Indian Ocean south of the Maldive Islands. The crew of 39 was reported missing.

=== 19 May ===
List of shipwrecks: 19 May 2023
Ship	State	Description
Leafde fan Fryslân	Netherlands	The sailing ship was holed at the bow off the coast of Vlieland, Friesland. Twenty-five of the 27 people on board were rescued by lifeboat.

=== 28 May ===
List of shipwrecks: 28 May 2023
Ship	State	Description
Goduria	Italy	The houseboat (used as a party boat) capsized and sank off Sesto Calende on Lake Maggiore after a burst of wind and rain. Four people died. The boat had 25 people on board, including two employees of the national intelligence agency. The vessel had a capacity of 15. The owner of the boat is under investigation for shipwrecking and manslaughter.

== June ==
=== 3 June ===
List of shipwrecks: 3 June 2023
Ship	State	Description
KRI Teluk Hading	Indonesian Navy	The Teluk Gilimanuk-class landing ship caught fire 8 nautical miles (15 km; 9.2 mi) off Bira, Bulukumba Regency, South Sulawesi at 14:15 Central Indonesian Time.

=== 5 June ===
List of shipwrecks: 5 June 2023
Ship	State	Description
MSC Rita	Panama	The container ship caught fire off Dubai. A crew member was airlifted off and taken to hospital. She was on a voyage from Dubai to Abu Dhabi.

=== 6 June ===
List of shipwrecks: 6 June 2023
Ship	State	Description
Mekhanik Pogodin	Russia	Russian invasion of Ukraine: The tanker washed ashore on Kinburn Spit after the Kakhovka Dam was destroyed. The vessel was still aground when destroyed by a Ukrainian air strike on 11 March 2024.

=== 12 June ===
List of shipwrecks: 12 June 2023
Ship	State	Description
LCT Cipta Harapan IX	Indonesia	The tank landing craft capsized and sank in the Java Sea 70 nautical miles (130 km; 81 mi) off the north coast of Java halfway between Jakarta and Surabaya. Six crew were rescued, five were reported missing.

=== 13 June ===
List of shipwrecks: 13 June 2023
Ship	State	Description
Hurricane	Egypt	The motor yacht caught fire in the Red Sea off Port Ghalib with the loss of three of the 29 people on board.
Kwara boat disaster	Nigeria	A vessel travelling between Niger State and Kwara State capsized and sank in the Nigerian part of the Niger River.

=== 14 June ===
List of shipwrecks: 14 June 2023
Ship	State	Description
Adriana	Greece	A boat carrying migrants capsized and sank in the Ionian Sea off the coast of Pylos, Messenia. The boat was transporting 400–750 people, of whom 104 were rescued.

=== 16 June ===
List of shipwrecks: 16 June 2023
Ship	State	Description
Unknown tugboat	United States	A tug struck an object, capsized and sank in rough weather just north of Mount Vernon, Alabama in the Alabama River between mile markers 27 and 28. The ship was later salvaged. Her captain died and one deck hand was rescued.

=== 18 June ===
List of shipwrecks: 18 June 2023
Ship	State	Description
Titan	United States	The deep-sea submersible disappeared on a dive to the wreck of Titanic (United Kingdom) with five people on board. On 22 June, the United States Coast Guard announced the discovery of her wreck about 1,600 feet (490 m) from Titanic's bow.

=== 21 June ===
List of shipwrecks: 21 June 2023
Ship	State	Description
Un-named inflatable boat	Spain	A migrant boat sank off the coast of the Canary Islands. Thirty-five to 39 people were reported missing and presumed dead.

=== 29 June ===
List of shipwrecks: 29 June 2023
Ship	State	Description
RMS Atlantis	United States	The retired 125-foot (38 m) offshore supply vessel was sunk as an artificial reef eight point one four miles (13.10 km) south of East Pass, Destin, Florida (30°14′N 86°30′W) in 78 feet (24 m) of water. Prior to being sunk she was aground in Santa Rosa Sound off Hurlburt Field, Florida for a few months.

== July ==
=== 3 July ===
List of shipwrecks: 3 July 2023
Ship	State	Description
O. T. Shagor Nandini-2	Bangladesh	The tanker's superstructure was destroyed by fire on 30 June in the Sugandha River, Bangladesh, with four crew reported missing. While fuel was being transferred off the vessel on 3 July there was an explosion in the cargo tanks of the diesel and petroleum fuel the vessel was carrying. The fire turned the ship into an inferno, with at least 14 more people injured.

=== 5 July ===
List of shipwrecks: 3 July 2023
Ship	State	Description
Grande Costa D'Avorio	Italy	The car carrier caught fire while offloading at the port of Newark, New Jersey, United States with two firefighters dying and six injured. The fire was extinguished on 12 July and all cargo was unloaded. The vessel is being salvaged and is expected to return to service.

=== 6 July ===
List of shipwrecks: 6 July 2023
Ship	State	Description
Pangaon Express	Bangladesh	The container ship sank, partially above water, in the Bhasan Char area of Bangladesh in the Bay of Bengal. The ship's cargo will be lightered and there are plans to refloat the vessel. The crew were rescued.

=== 7 July ===
List of shipwrecks: 7 July 2023
Ship	State	Description
Unknown barge	Unknown	A barge went aground on the southern coast of Mannar Island, Sri Lanka, in the Gulf of Mannar after breaking loose from Avadh (Palau).

=== 10 July ===
List of shipwrecks: 10 July 2023
Ship	State	Description
Mazarine	Malta	The ro-ro ship ran aground at the Wolf Rock Lighthouse, Cornwall, United Kingdom. She was on a voyage from Ireland to Zeebrugge, West Flanders, Belgium. She was refloated and towed in to Falmouth Bay, Cornwall.

=== 11 July ===
List of shipwrecks: 11 July 2023
Ship	State	Description
Beks Bebek	Marshall Islands	The tanker ran aground near Skhira, Tunisia, in the Gulf of Gabes, in the Mediterranean Sea. The vessel was refloated on 22 July.

=== 14 July ===
List of shipwrecks: 14 July 2023
Ship	State	Description
Karya Budi Terang VI and Sjumber Jaya 01	Indonesia	The coastal tankers were driven ashore together by strong currents near the Batang Harau River mouth, Padang, Sumatra. The crews were safe.
BRP Lake Caliraya	Philippine Navy	The decommissioned Philippine Navy tanker ran aground off Morong, Bataan, Philippines while being sent to be used as a target in a military exercise. The vessel was later refloated.

=== 15 July ===
List of shipwrecks: 15 July 2023
Ship	State	Description
USNS Alan Shepard	United States Navy	The Lewis and Clark-class dry cargo ship ran aground off Al Hidd, Bahrain, and was refloated the following day. Alan Shepard was not significantly damaged.
Time	United States	The 127-foot (39 m) yacht was sunk 15 miles (24 km) southeast of the Fort Pierce Inlet, Florida, in the Atlantic Ocean as an artificial reef.

=== 17 July ===
List of shipwrecks: 17 July 2023
Ship	State	Description
Unknown sand carrier	Unknown	A sand carrier was sunk in a collision with Xin Yuan Long 6 (China) off Ningbo, China. Xin Yaun Long 6 was at least partially sunk with a list.

=== 20 July ===
List of shipwrecks: 20 July 2023
Ship	State	Description
Ternopil	Russia	The captured Grisha-class anti-submarine corvette was sunk as a target during live fire exercises by the Black Sea Fleet. She was reportedly struck by a SS-N-22 missile fired by the Tarantul III missile boat Ivanovets (Russian Navy) in the northwestern part of the Black Sea.
Tung Sung	Malaysia	The cargo ship capsized and sank near Pulau Burung, Sebuyau, Sarawak, Malaysia. The crew of nine were reported missing.

=== 21 July ===
List of shipwrecks: 21 July 2023
Ship	State	Description
Angel	Palau	The container ship, which had been evacuated on 19 July, capsized and sank 5 km (3.1 mi) off Kaohsiung, Taiwan.

=== 22 July ===
List of shipwrecks: 22 July 2023
Ship	State	Description
Grande Senegal	Italy	The roll on-roll off ship ran aground on Madagascar reefs off northwest Yucatan, Mexico in the Gulf of Mexico. The vessel was still aground as of 25 July.

=== 24 July ===
List of shipwrecks: 24 July 2023
Ship	State	Description
Unknown ferry	Indonesia	A small ferry capsized off Sulawesi Island, Indonesia. At least 15 people died and 19 others were reported missing.

=== 26 July ===
List of shipwrecks: 26 July 2023
Ship	State	Description
Fremantle Highway	Panama	The car carrier caught fire in the North Sea north of Ameland, Friesland, Netherlands with the loss of one of her 24 crew. She was on a voyage from Bremerhaven, Germany to an Egyptian port. She was taken in tow for a point 16 nautical miles (30 km) north of Schiermonnikoog, Friesland on 31 July. After the fire had burned out, Freemantle Highway was towed into Eemshaven, Groningen (Netherlands) on 3 August.

=== 29 July ===
List of shipwrecks: 29 July 2023
Ship	State	Description
Cujo	Flag unknown	The yacht sank in 2,500 metres (8,200 ft) of water 19 nautical miles (35 km) off the coast of Beaulieu-sur-Mer, France.

=== Unknown date ===
List of shipwrecks: Unknown date in July 2023
Ship	State	Description
Micheal R	United States	The tugboat sank at dock in the Tennessee River near the O'Neil Bridge, Florence, Alabama between 14 and 15 July. The vessel was expected to be raised.

== August ==
=== 5 August ===
List of shipwrecks: 5 August 2023
Ship	State	Description
Fahd	Egypt	The Suez Canal tugboat was sunk in the Suez Canal in a collision with the LPG tanker Chinagas Legend (Hong Kong). One crewman was killed. The wreck was raised on 8 August.

=== 6 August ===
List of shipwrecks: 6 August 2023
Ship	State	Description
BG Labanan 6	Indonesia	The barge broke loose from the tugboat Atlantic Star 11 (Indonesia) in the Java Sea in rough weather. The barge ran aground onto reefs off Masalembu Island, and was partially sunk. The vessel was still aground as of 7 August.

=== 8 August ===
List of shipwrecks: 8 August 2023
Ship	State	Description
Jacqueline A	United States	The 59-foot (18 m) tug sank 3 miles (4.8 km) off Myrtle Beach, South Carolina in 31 feet (9.4 m) of water. Three crewmembers were rescued by the United States Coast Guard.

=== 12 August ===
List of shipwrecks: 12 August 2023
Ship	State	Description
Irmao	Spain	The 27-metre (89 ft) motor yacht was destroyed by fire off Formentera, in the Mediterranean Sea she was towed out to sea and sank early the next morning. All on board were rescued.

=== 14 August ===
List of shipwrecks: 14 August 2023
Ship	State	Description
Un-named pirogue	Senegal	2023 Cape Verde migrant boat disaster

=== 15 August ===
List of shipwrecks: 15 August 2023
Ship	State	Description
Unnamed sailboat		A sailboat sank near Cay Sal island, the Bahamas. The 64-year old Dutchman who was sailing the boat was found three days later and rescued from the island.

=== 24 August ===
List of shipwrecks: 24 August 2023
Ship	State	Description
Izumi Maru	Japan	The cargo ship capsized in a collision with Contship Uno (Liberia) in the Kii Strait, Honshu, Japan. Three crew were rescued, two were reported missing.

=== 25 August ===
List of shipwrecks: 25 August 2023
Ship	State	Description
Timp No. 13302	Taiwan	The harbor tug was sunk in shallow water in a collision with the ferry New Taima (Taiwan) that she was assisting at Fuao port, Matsu Islands, Taiwan. The crew was safe.

=== 27 August ===
List of shipwrecks: 27 August 2023
Ship	State	Description
Anita DJ II	Philippines	Typhoon Saola: The fishing vessel capsized and sank seven nautical miles (13 km; 8.1 mi) off Cape Santiago, Calatagan, Batangas Province, Luzon, Philippines. All 13 crew were rescued.

=== 28 August ===
List of shipwrecks: 28 August 2023
Ship	State	Description
Hua Hai 601	China	Typhoon Saola: The bulk carrier capsized and sank off Jiangsu Province just north of Shanghai in the East China Sea. All crew were rescued.
Zheng He 9	China	Typhoon Saola: The bulk carrier sprung a leak in the cargo hold, capsized, and sank, or sank upright in shallow water with superstructure above water, off Jiangsu Province just north of Shanghai in the East China Sea. All ten crew were rescued.

== September ==
=== 1 September ===
List of shipwrecks: 1 September 2023
Ship	State	Description
Leonie	Finland	The coaster ran aground on an islet in the Åland archipelago. Her hull was holed.

=== 3 September ===
List of shipwrecks: 3 September 2023
Ship	State	Description
Unknown patrol boat	Russian Navy	Russian invasion of Ukraine: A Project KS-701 Tunets-class patrol boat was sunk in the Black Sea by a Ukrainian Bayraktar TB-2 armed drone.

=== 4 September ===
List of shipwrecks: 4 September 2023
Ship	State	Description
Mazapeta	United States	The abandoned former Woban-class tugboat sank in Little Potato Slough in the San Joaquin Delta, northwest of Stockton, California. Raised for disposal on 14 January 2024.

=== 11 September ===
List of shipwrecks: 11 September 2023
Ship	State	Description
Chiapa Star	Malta	The container ship listed and sank at dock at Mazatlán, Mexico, resting on the bottom.
Ocean Explorer	Bahamas	The cruise ship ran aground in Alpefjord, Northeast Greenland National Park. Refloated on 14 September.
Unknown	Nigeria	A vessel capsized in the Niger River Gbajibo community, in the Mokwa District, Niger State, Nigeria located 251 kilometres (156 mi) from Minna. Thirty people were killed, 30 rescued, and dozens reported missing.

=== 12 September ===
List of shipwrecks: 12 September 2023
Ship	State	Description
Der Hae No. 66	Taiwan	The fishing vessel sank in the Indian Ocean 320 nautical miles (590 km) southeast of Durban, South Africa. The crew were rescued from life rafts.

=== 13 September ===
List of shipwrecks: 13 September 2023
Ship	State	Description
Minsk	Russian Navy	Russian invasion of Ukraine: The Ropucha-class landing ship was severely damaged in a Ukrainian missile attack while in drydock at Sevastopol.
Rostov-on-Don	Russian Navy	Russian invasion of Ukraine: The Kilo-class submarine was severely damaged in a Ukrainian missile attack while in drydock at Sevastopol.
Unknown patrol boat	Russian Navy	Russian invasion of Ukraine: A Project KS-701 Tunets-class patrol boat was sunk in the Black Sea in a Ukrainian attack.

=== 18 September ===
List of shipwrecks: 18 September 2023
Ship	State	Description
KMP Gerbang Samudra	Indonesia	The ferry ran aground in the Bali Strait. All passengers were evacuated. The ferry was still aground as 20 September.

=== 24 September ===
List of shipwrecks: 24 September 2023
Ship	State	Description
Castlemore	Ireland	The recently sold trawler, crewed by two apparently inexperienced hands, ran aground on a sandbank while allegedly en route to rendezvous with MV Matthew, a cargo ship carrying 2,253 kilograms (4,967 lb) of South American cocaine, worth approximately €157 million.
NACC Argonaut	Canada	The cement carrier ran aground in the St. Lawrence River between St. Regis Island and Cornwall Island off Cornwall, Ontario. This caused the closure of the St. Lawrence Seaway. The ship was refloated on 26 September.

== October ==
=== 2 October ===
List of shipwrecks: 2 October 2023
Ship	State	Description
Dearyn	Philippines	The fishing vessel Dearyn was sunk in a hit-and-run collision north west of Scarborough Shoal in the South China Sea. The oil crude tanker Pacific Anna collided with Dearyn killing three people.

=== 4 October ===
List of shipwrecks: 4 October 2023
Ship	State	Description
Bonnie G	Vanuatu	The tugboat drifted aground just south of the airport, off the southern coast of St. Thomas Island, US Virgin Islands after being abandoned. Her hull was breached and the engine room flooded.

=== 10 October ===
List of shipwrecks: 10 October 2023
Ship	State	Description
Navis One	Malaysia	The mega yacht caught fire on the evening of 9 October off Koufonisi Island, Greece in the Aegean Sea. The vessel burned out and sank in the morning of 10 October. All 22 on board were rescued.

=== 11 October ===
List of shipwrecks: 11 October 2023
Ship	State	Description
Pavel Derzhavin	Russian Navy	Russian invasion of Ukraine: The Project 22160 patrol ship was hit by a naval drone and damaged off Sevastopol, Russian-occupied Crimea.

=== 17 October ===
List of shipwrecks: 17 October 2023
Ship	State	Description
Aleksander Gusev	Russia	The 28-metre (92 ft) cargo ship ran onto, or drifted aground, on the coast of Karelinskaya Guba Inlet, Kola Peninsula, Russia in a storm. Due to bottom damage unable to be salvaged, a total loss. Crew taken off.
Australia	Australia	The yacht, owned by Clive Palmer, ran aground in the Buran Channel off Sentosa Island in Singapore. The ship was later refloated.

=== 21 October ===
List of shipwrecks: 21 October 2023
Ship	State	Description
Moon Dragon	Flag unknown	The catamaran sailing yacht capsized about 140 miles (230 km) from Wilmington, North Carolina after hatches broke in winds reported to be at 35 mph (56 km/h) and seas at 11 to 12 feet (3.4 to 3.7 m). The vessel is still partially floating as a hazard to navigation. Four Canadians on board were rescued by a United States Coast Guard Sikorsky MH-60 Jayhawk helicopter.

=== 22 October ===
List of shipwrecks: 2 October 2023
Ship	State	Description
Unknown boat	Democratic Republic of Congo	A boat capsized on the Congo River while travelling from Ngondo, killing at least 28 people.
Unknown fishing vessel	South Korea	A fishing vessel was sunk in a collision with an unknown tugboat near Buan, South Korea. Four crew were killed and 14 slightly injured.

=== 24 October ===
List of shipwrecks: 24 October 2023
Ship	State	Description
Verity	United Kingdom	2023 North Sea incident: The cargo ship collided with Polesie (Bahamas) and sank 14 nautical miles (26 km; 16 mi) south west of Helgoland, Germany in the German Bight. Four of her crew are missing, two were rescued, one dead. Verity was on a voyage from Bremen, Germany to Immingham, North East Lincolnshire.

=== 25 October ===
List of shipwrecks: 25 October 2023
Ship	State	Description
Arca Ray	Unknown	Hurricane Otis: The vessel sank in Acapulco Bay during the hurricane, apparently lost with at least 20 crew.
Litos	Unknown	Hurricane Otis: The 94-foot (29 m) motor yacht sank in Acapulco Bay during the hurricane, apparently lost with all four crew.
Unknown cargo ship	Unknown	Hurricane Otis: A cargo ship was driven aground and probably sunk in Acapulco Bay during the hurricane.
Unknown tugboat	Unknown	Hurricane Otis: A tugboat was driven aground and sank in Acapulco Bay during the hurricane.

=== 27 October ===
List of shipwrecks: 2 October 2023
Ship	State	Description
Unknown fishing vessel	South Korea	A 24-ton fishing vessel capsized in high waves near Jeju Island, South Korea. Her captain died of cardiac arrest. The other seven crew were rescued.

=== 30 October ===
List of shipwrecks: 30 October 2023
Ship	State	Description
Flying Eagle	United States	The sailing vessel (a.k.a. Blackbeard Pirate Ship) was sunk as an artificial reef sixteen miles (26 km) south of East Pass, Destin, Florida (30°08′N 86°33′W) after being burned out sometime in the past.

=== 31 October ===
List of shipwrecks: 31 October 2023
Ship	State	Description
Nuevo Abeijón	Spain	The fishing vessel sank off Monte Louro, Spain area due to poor sea conditions. The four crew members who were on board were rescued safely.

== November ==
=== 3 November ===
List of shipwrecks: 3 November 2023
Ship	State	Description
Unknown yacht	Denmark	Storm Ciaran: A sailing yacht capsized around one kilometre (0.62 mi) off Santa Cruz, Torres Vedras, roughly 60 kilometres (37 mi) north of Lisbon, Portugal, later drifting ashore. Four people on board died.

=== 4 November ===
List of shipwrecks: 4 November 2023
Ship	State	Description
Askold	Russian Navy	The Karakurt-class corvette was severely damaged during a missile attack on Crimea by Ukrainian forces.

=== 10 November ===
List of shipwrecks: 10 November 2023
Ship	State	Description
Victoria	Russia	The tanker ran aground some two cable lengths off southwest Sakhalin, Russia near Cape Lopatino, in the Sea of Japan. The ship's cargo of oil began to be transferred to shore on 14 November.

=== 14 November ===
List of shipwrecks: 14 November 2023
Ship	State	Description
Blue Lagoon Island	The Bahamas	A Blue Lagoon Island ferry taking over 100 tourists to Blue Lagoon Island in The Bahamas sank, killing one person and injuring two others.

=== 17 November ===
List of shipwrecks: 17 November 2023
Ship	State	Description
Unknown barge	United States	A barge sank in shallow water partially above water at LaSala Boatyard, Copiague, New York in Great Neck Creek.
Unknown tugboat	United States	A tug sank in shallow water partially above water at LaSala Boatyard, Copiague, New York in Great Neck Creek.

=== 18 November ===
List of shipwrecks: 18 November 2023
Ship	State	Description
Here and Now	United States	During a voyage from Port Canaveral, Florida, to Biloxi, Mississippi, with multiple stops along the way, the sailboat began flooding 30 hours after departing St. Petersburg, Florida, and was abandoned without loss of life in the Gulf of Mexico 90 nautical miles (170 km) off Hernando Beach, Florida. A United States Coast Guard helicopter rescued a married couple and their dog from the sailboat.

=== 19 November ===
List of shipwrecks: 19 November 2023
Ship	State	Description
Kafkametler	Turkey	The cargo ship dragged anchor in a storm striking a breakwater and sinking at Ereğli, Turkey in the Black Sea. One crewman was reported killed.
Pallada	Cameroon	The river-sea cargo ship dragged anchor in a storm, went aground, and broke in two at Ereğli, Turkey in the Black Sea. The crew were rescued.
Susan Rose	United States	The 77-foot (23 m) fishing trawler sank in 48 feet (15 m) of water one-half mile (0.80 km) off Manasquan Inlet during salvage operations after running aground on 17 November.

=== 21 November ===
List of shipwrecks: 21 November 2023
Ship	State	Description
Viet Hai Star	Vietnam	The cargo ship sprang a leak in the South China Sea and sank in shallow water with her superstructure above water after being run into Calandorang Bay, on the eastern coast of Balabac Island, Philippines, to prevent sinking in deep water.

=== 26 November ===
List of shipwrecks: 26 November 2023
Ship	State	Description
Blue Shark	Belize	The cargo ship was beached in a storm at Vityazevo, Russia in the Black Sea.
Raptor	Comoros	The cargo ship sank in rough seas off the southwest coast of Lesvos Island, Greece, in the Aegean Sea. One crewman was rescued by a Hellenic Navy helicopter. 13 crew were reported missing.
Unknown ferries or barges	Russia	Seven barges or ferries were anchored in August in the Kerch Strait to protect the Crimean Bridge from Ukrainian seaborn drone attacks. During a severe storm three sank, one partially sank (possibly sunk in shallow water), and two "washed away".

=== 27 November ===
List of shipwrecks: 27 November 2023
Ship	State	Description
FR Pearl	Palau	The cargo ship was beached by a storm after dragging anchor at Hopa, Turkey in the Black Sea.
Vamos	Cameroon	The cargo ship broke free from her moorings in a storm at Inebolu port, Turkey, and drifted ashore in Filli Kosk area in the Black Sea.

=== 28 November ===
List of shipwrecks: 28 November 2023
Ship	State	Description
Nam Phat 01	Vietnam	The cargo ship sprung a leak and was beached on the coast of Thăng Bình district to prevent sinking.

=== 29 November ===
List of shipwrecks: 29 November 2023
Ship	State	Description
Xiang Shun 899	China	The 200-ton cargo ship sank partially submerged in shallow waters with a list, off Gageo Island, South Korea.

=== Unknown date ===
List of shipwrecks: Unknown date November 2023
Ship	State	Description
King Rich	Sierra Leone	The tanker was found on the coast of Cu Lao Cham Island, Vietnam, on the morning of 1 December after she was abandoned on 18 November after springing a leak 81 nautical miles (150 km) north west of Badoc Island, Luzon, drifting some 620 nautical miles (1,150 km) in west south west direction. The crew was rescued from a life raft by Sheng An (Hong Kong).

== December ==
=== 2 December ===
List of shipwrecks: 2 December 2023
Ship	State	Description
Liberty	Cameroon	The tanker ran aground in the Strait of Malacca in Indonesian waters. Refloated on 14 December.

=== 13 December ===
List of shipwrecks: 13 December 2023
Ship	State	Description
KMT-3	United States	The tug capsized and sank in the Willamette River at Gladstone, Oregon (45°22′N 122°36′W).
Two Brothers	Unknown	The ro-ro cargo ship capsized and sank approximately 30 miles (48 km) north of Puerto Plata, Dominican Republic. Six crew were rescued by Carnival Vista (Panama) and six by a United States Coast Guard Sikorsky MH-60 Jayhawk helicopter.

=== 16 December ===
List of shipwrecks: 16 December 2023
Ship	State	Description
Miss Jordi	United States	The 63-foot (19 m) shrimp boat sank in a storm near McKay Bay, off the Tampa Shrimp Docks, Tampa, Florida. One body was recovered.
Unknown barge	United States	A barge sank at Brooklyn, New York, in Newtown Creek (40°43′N 73°55′W).
Unknown tugboat	United States	A tug sank at Brooklyn, New York, in Newtown Creek (40°43′N 73°55′W).

=== 17 December ===
List of shipwrecks: 17 December 2023
Ship	State	Description
Gia Bao 19	Vietnam	The cargo ship sank in the South China Sea 35 nautical miles (65 km) north of Đà Nẵng, Vietnam.
Tumberry C	Spain	The 48-metre (157 ft) yacht sprung a leak in her engine room ad was run aground to prevent sinking in deeper water at Pontevedra, Spain.

=== 19 December ===
List of shipwrecks: 19 December 2023
Ship	State	Description
Global Vision	Indonesia	The cargo ship sank in the Bali Sea northeast of Bali, 25 nautical miles (46 km; 29 mi) south of Panjang Island, East Java, Indonesia. Five crew were rescued, and eight reported missing, or 13 were rescued and 8 reported missing.

=== 21 December ===
List of shipwrecks: 21 December 2023
Ship	State	Description
New Bright	South Korea	The tanker ship suffered a major explosion and fire in the Yangtze River, near Sutong Bridge, Shanghai, China. The vessel was run aground to prevent sinking. The crew was evacuated.
T Sandeemanethup	Thailand	The ferry sank in 30 metres (98 ft) of water in rough weather 5.5 nautical miles (10.2 km) off Koh Tao in the Gulf of Thailand. The ship was expected to be raised. The crew and passengers were rescued.

=== 26 December ===
List of shipwrecks: 26 December 2023
Ship	State	Description
Novocherkassk	Russian Navy	Russian invasion of Ukraine: The Ropucha-class landing ship was blown up and sunk by an anti-ship missile at Feodosia. There were reported casualties of 74 crew killed and 27 wounded. The wreck was apparently removed in late January/early February 2024.
Unknown fishing vessel	China	A fishing vessel was sunk in a collision with Pearl Kenzo (Singapore) off Chengshan Jiao, China. Eight crew were reported missing.
UTS-150	Russian Navy	Russian invasion of Ukraine: The training ship, a former T43-class minesweeper, was sunk by the explosion of Novocherkassk (Russian Navy) at Feodosia.

=== 27 December ===
List of shipwrecks: 27 December 2023
Ship	State	Description
Vyssos	Panama	Russian invasion of Ukraine: The freighter struck a naval mine off Bystre at the entrance to the Danube Delta. The ship was grounded to prevent sinking. One crewman was injured.

== Unknown date ==
List of shipwrecks: Unknown date 2023
Ship	State	Description
Compton Castle	United Kingdom	The derelict paddle steamer sank at dock at Lemon Quay, Truro, Cornwall sometime in 2023. She is scheduled to be broken up in place starting on 25 June 2025.

== See also ==
- 2023 in the environment
