= 2023 Heligoland ship collision =

Fatal crash in the North Sea

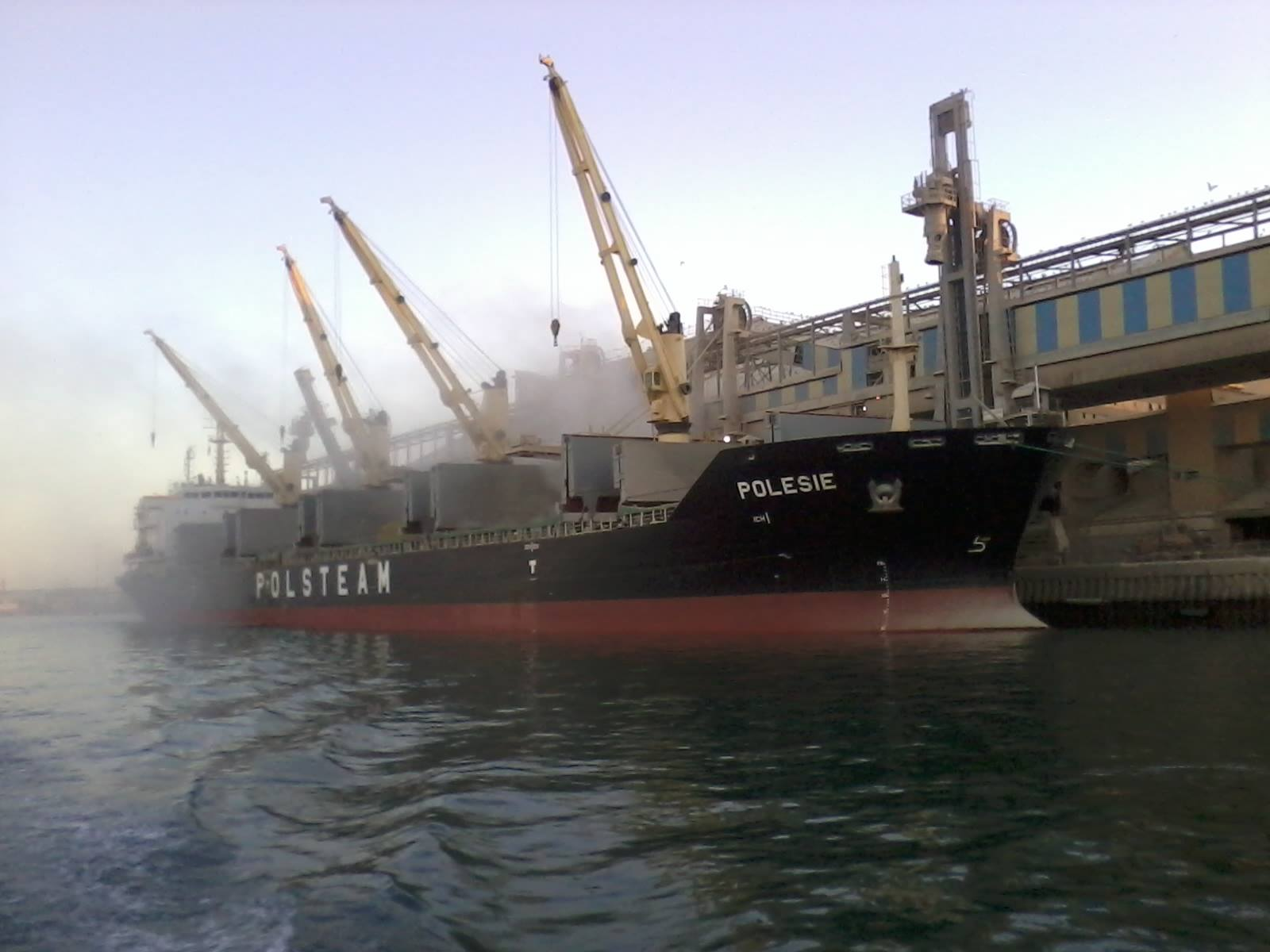
Polesie in 2016

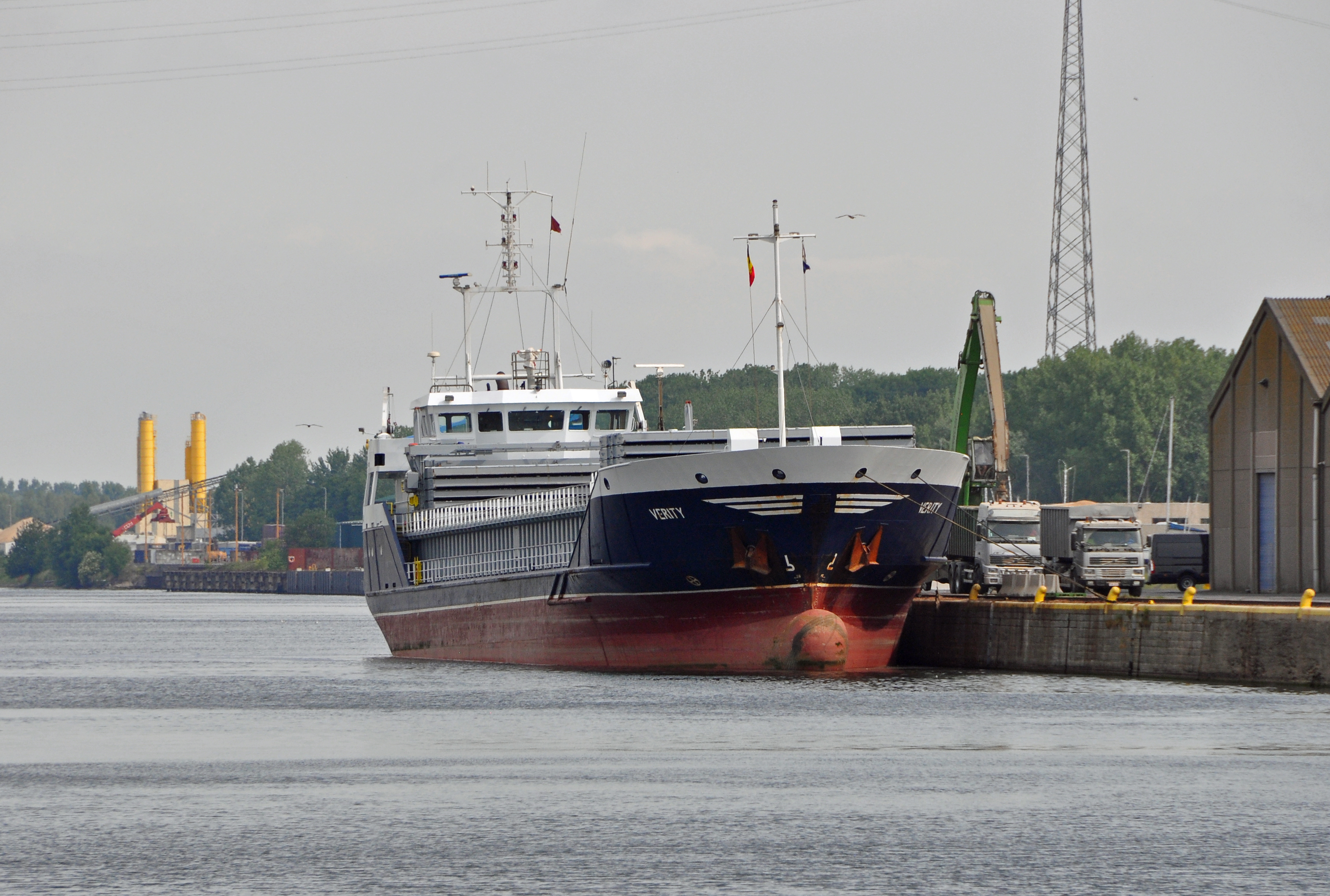
Verity in 2020

On 24 October 2023, two cargo ships collided in the North Sea near Heligoland in Germany. Three people were killed, and as of February 2026 two remain missing and presumed dead. The two vessels were the Isle of Man-flagged Verity, which sank, and the Bahamian-flagged Polesie.

== Background ==
Verity was carrying steel from the northern German port of Bremen to Immingham in Lincolnshire, England, when it was involved in a collision with Polesie, which had departed from Hamburg port, northern Germany, for La Coruña in northwestern Spain. Verity was built in The Netherlands in 2001 and operated since 2008 by the Anglo-Dutch shipping company Faversham Ships, based at Cowes, Isle of Wight. It was a general cargo ship, measured 2,601 GT, had an overall length of 91.25 m (299.4 ft) and capacity of 3,676 DWT; Verity was registered in the Isle of Man and carried IMO number 9229178. There was a crew of seven on board.

The 'handysize' bulk carrier Polesie belongs to the Polish shipping company Polsteam, based in Szczecin. It was built in China in 2009 for Polsteam, measuring 24,055 GT, with an overall length of 189.99 m (623.3 ft) and capacity of 38,056 DWT; Polesie is registered in the Bahamas, carries IMO number 9488097 and has 22 crew.

== Collision ==
The collision took place in the German Bight, North Sea, 14 nautical miles (26 km; 16 mi) southwest of Heligoland and 17 nautical miles (31 km; 20 mi) northeast of the island of Langeoog at around 05:00 Central European Summer Time (CEST) (UTC+2) on 24 October 2023. Verity's automatic identification system (AIS) transmissions ceased at 04.56 CEST, suggesting that it sank immediately after the collision. It was dark, and German authorities reported strong winds and three-metre waves in the area. Polesie was not seriously damaged and was able to return to Cuxhaven, all crew members remaining uninjured.

== Search ==
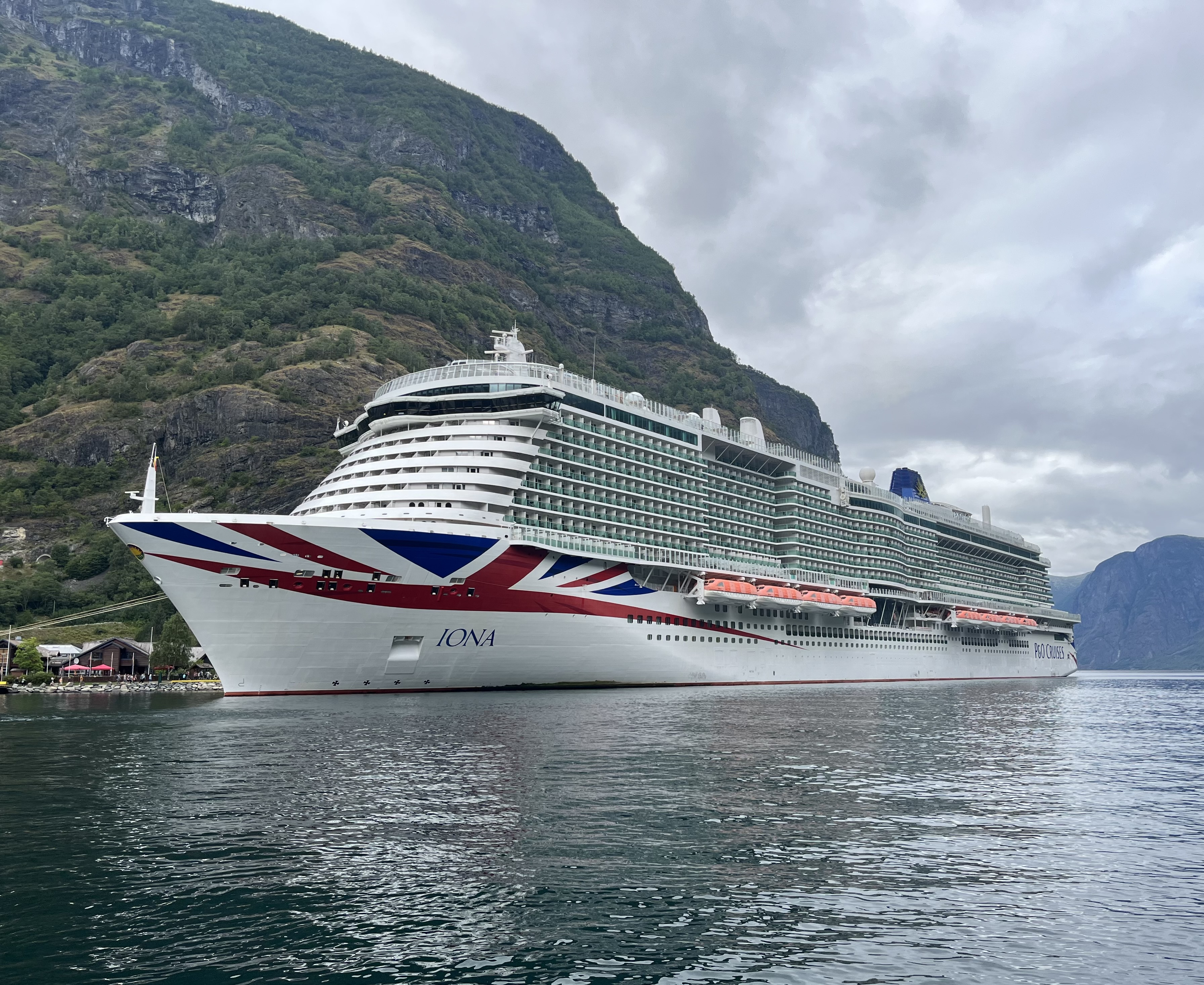
P&O Iona

P&O Cruises confirmed that a ship in its fleet, Iona, had been in the area and was involved in the subsequent search. The German Central Command for Maritime Emergencies deployed two sea rescue cruisers and coordinated a German Navy helicopter and a water police boat, resulting in the rescue of two survivors. One of Verity's crew was found dead in the water; the remaining four of an original total of seven crew were missing. A search was called off the next day.

The Deutsche Gesellschaft zur Rettung Schiffbrüchiger (German Maritime Search and Rescue Service) sent the SAR-cruisers Hermann Marwede (Station Heligoland) and Bernhard Gruben (Station Hooksiel). The Federal emergency tug Nordic, and the pilot tender Wangerooge, as well as the water police boat Sylt and a SAR helicopter from the German Navy were involved in the SAR operation. The P&O cruise liner Iona spent the day and night scouring the sea off the north German coast for the missing crew.

The sea area where the missing sailors might be was searched during the night of 25-26 October without success, and rescuers then stopped the search. The search during the night of 25-26 October was documented in two parts as part of a television documentary series 'Die Seenotretter' ('The Sea Rescuers') produced by Norddeutscher Rundfunk ('North German Broadcasting').

A remotely operated underwater vehicle (ROV) was lowered to the wreck of Verity to search for signs of life from the missing sailors. For a while after the sinking there was considered to be a possibility that sailors could be in an air bubble in the ship and still be alive.

In 2024 the wreck of Verity was lifted in two sections. Two crewmembers were found dead in the wreckage, leaving two still missing.

== Salvage ==
The hull of Verity was retrieved in two parts from the seabed in September 2024 in a lifting operation involving the floating crane HEBO-Lift 10. During the operation, further two bodies were recovered, which left two crew members unaccounted for. As of February 2026, the date of publication of MAIB Investigation report 5-2026, two crew members were still unaccounted for.

== Investigation ==
The German Federal Bureau for Maritime Casualty Investigation (Bundesstelle für Seeunfalluntersuchung, BSU) in Hamburg began investigating the cause of the accident. The BSU says it is a "very serious maritime accident" and that the investigation is being conducted together with the freighters' two flag states - Bahamas and Great Britain. On 25 October 2023 it was reported that the responsible maritime accident investigation authority in Great Britain, the Marine Accident Investigation Branch, was taking over the management of the joint investigation; the general manager of the Verband Deutscher Reeder (Association of German Shipowners), Martin Kröger, stated that it is "far too early to say what was the cause of the accident".

In October 2024, the UK MAIB released its preliminary investigation report.

In February 2026, the UK MAIB released the final investigation report. The synopsis of the report states "Analysis of the application of the IRPCS by Verity's and Polesie's watchkeepers indicated significant shortcomings. Specifically, both watchkeepers were willing to accept inappropriately close passing distances given that their room for manoeuvre was not overly constrained by navigational hazards or limited by other traffic. The early use of very high frequency radio could have avoided ambiguity as to each vessel's actions. When actions were eventually taken to avoid a collision, they were neither positive, so as to be readily apparent to other observers, nor made in ample time."

However, what made the accident unusual was that the collision was in fact 'assisted' by Vessel Traffic Service (VTS) 'German Bight'. "Its initial intervention was relatively late; (...), and the use of a duplex radio channel hampered the passing of crucial information." When VTS assistant first called Verity the VTS display indicated a closest point of approach (CPA) of less than 0.1nmi within 8 minutes time to closest point of approach (TCPA) and a distance between vessels of less than 1.3nmi.

"The VTS supervisor's second instruction to Polesie's officer of the watch (OOW) was given when the vessels were so close that VTS intervention was counterproductive." According to the final investigation report, post-accident reconstruction shows that, had Polesie's OOW continued the turn to port instead of altering course hard to starboard as instructed by the VTS supervisor, the two vessels would not have collided. "Polesie's OOW had decided to alter course to port to avoid collision with Verity, and their change of mind to instead alter course hard to starboard proved catastrophic. (...) The investigation has concluded that the OOW felt compelled to obey the VTS supervisor's instruction.

The German Federal Bureau for Maritime Casualty Investigation (Bundesstelle für Seeunfalluntersuchung, BSU) announced in the official maritime publication 'Notices to Mariners', published on 20 February 2026, that it 'believes that some of the technical assessments and conclusions need to be supplemented. For this reason, the BSU will publish its own supplementary statement on the MAIB investigation report at a later date. This statement will present the findings of its own analysis of the accident and the external circumstances.

== See also ==
- List of shipwrecks in 2023
