= SLNS Vijayabahu =

Sri Lanka Navy Hamilton-class cutter

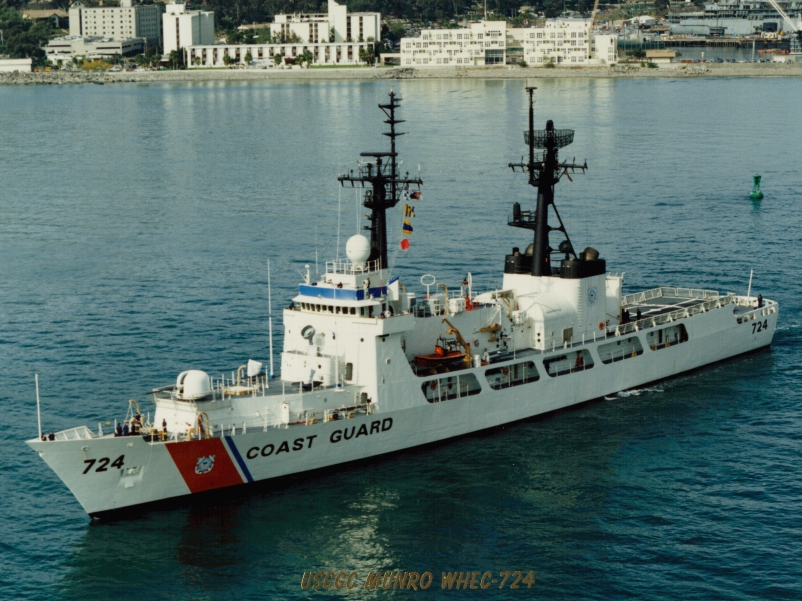
- USCGC Douglas Munro (WHEC-724)

History

United States
- Name: USCGC Douglas Munro
- Namesake: Douglas Albert Munro
- Operator: United States Coast Guard
- Builder: Avondale Shipyards
- Commissioned: September 27, 1971
- Decommissioned: April 24, 2021
- Home port: Kodiak, Alaska
- Identification: MMSI number: 367278000; Callsign: NGDF
- Motto: Honoring the Past by Serving the Present
- Status: Decommissioned
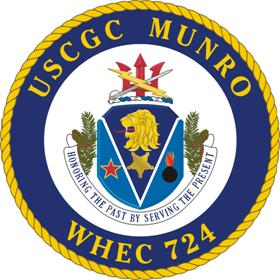
- Badge: Crest of USCGC Douglas Munro

Sri Lanka
- Name: SLNS Vijayabahu
- Namesake: King Vijayabahu
- Acquired: 26 October 2021
- Commissioned: 22 November 2022
- Status: Active

General characteristics
- Type: High Endurance Cutter
- Displacement: 3,250 tons
- Length: 378 ft (115 m)
- Beam: 43 ft (13 m)
- Draught: 15 ft (4.6 m)
- Propulsion: Two diesel engines and two gas turbine engines
- Speed: 27 knots (50 km/h; 31 mph)
- Range: 14,000 mi (23,000 km)
- Endurance: 45 days
- Complement: 167 personnel
- Sensors & processing systems: AN/SPS-40 air-search radar
- Armament: Otobreda 76 mm gun; Phalanx CIWS (during USCG service); 6 × M2HB 12.7 mm heavy machine guns; Dual 23 mm cannon
- Aircraft carried: MH-65
- Aviation facilities: Helicopter pad, retractable hangar bay

SLNS Vijayabahu (P627) (Sinhala: විජයබාහු, romanized: Vijayabāhu) is an advanced offshore patrol vessel of the Sri Lanka Navy. The ship is named after King Vijayabahu I, founder of the medieval Sinhala kingdom of Polonnaruwa.

Formerly called USCGC Douglas Munro (WHEC-724) and USCGC Munro (WHEC-724), a high-endurance cutter of the United States Coast Guard, she was then named for Signalman First Class Douglas A. Munro (1919–1942), the only coast guardsman to be awarded the Medal of Honor.

Munro was commissioned on September 27, 1971, at Avondale Shipyard in New Orleans, Louisiana. The tenth of 12 378-foot (115 m) cutters, she was the first to be named after a Coast Guard hero. The previously commissioned 378-footers had been named for former secretaries of the treasury, a tradition that began in 1830, when a cutter was named for Alexander Hamilton. Secretary of Transportation John A. Volpe and Douglas Munro's mother, Edith, were on hand to commission Munro. The ship's original complement included 17 officers and 143 enlisted men.

Douglas Munro was placed into in-commission special status on March 31, 2021, beginning the process of decommissioning the final Hamilton-class cutter. Douglas Munro was decommissioned on April 24, 2021, and was transferred to the Sri Lanka Navy on October 26, 2021, under pennant number P 627. She was commissioned by President Ranil Wickramasinghe on 20 November 2022 as SLNS Vijayabahu, becoming the second Hamilton-class cutter in Sri Lanka Navy.

== United States Coast Guard ==
=== 1970s ===
The dedication of the ship took place on April 15, 1972, at Munro's first homeport of Boston, Massachusetts. Secretary Volpe attended the ceremony. Her first commanding officer was Captain John T. Rouse. While operating out of Boston, the ship's original missions included ocean station patrol and search and rescue.

The stay in Boston was not to last long, however, as Munro shifted to a new homeport of Seattle, Washington, on August 29, 1973. The Seattle Post-Intelligencer hailed the arrival of "Two (Munro and Boutwell) of the newest, finest ships in the Coast Guard fleet." Seattle was also especially receptive to Munro because Douglas Munro himself had been a resident of Cle Elum, a small town in Washington. While operating out of Seattle, Munro became more active in the fisheries enforcement mission and less active in the ocean station mission, which was quickly being made obsolete by technological advances. Alaskan fisheries were especially busy and controversial at this time. In 1971, for instance, the combined Japanese, Russian, Canadian, and South Korean fishing fleets had caught about 10 times as many fish as the U.S. fleet did. Coast Guard action was badly needed to regulate the practices of these foreign fleets. Munro performed this mission with great success, including the seizure of the Korean longliner Dong Won No. 51 in June 1979.

=== 1980s ===
In 1980, the ship moved to yet another new homeport - Honolulu, Hawaii. While conducting training with the Japan Coast Guard in 1983, Munro was called upon to aid in the rescue and salvage operations for Korean Air Flight 007 in the Sea of Japan. In 1986, Munro interdicted the motor vessel Line Island Trader, which had been attempting to enter the U.S. with 4.5 tons of marijuana. Later that same year, the ship underwent an extensive three-year fleet rehabilitation and modernization program. Weapons systems were upgraded and many portions of the cutter were remodeled. Upon being recommissioned in November 1989, Munro was homeported at Coast Guard Island in Alameda, California.

=== 1990s and 2000s ===
In 1997, the cutter seized the Russian fishing trawler Chernyayevo in the Bering Sea for violation of the Magnuson-Stevens Fisheries Conservation and Management Act of 1976, setting an important precedent for law enforcement along the U.S./Russia maritime boundary. In 1998, Munro intercepted the Chinese vessel Chih Yung, carrying 172 people attempting to illegally enter the U.S. In 1999, the cutter interdicted the fishing vessel Eduardo I, carrying 83 illegal Ecuadorian migrants. Also in 1998, Munro interdicted the Mexican vessel Xolescuintle, seizing 11.5 tons of cocaine, one of the largest drug seizures in Coast Guard history. In 1999, the cutter seized the motor vessel Wing Fung Lung, carrying 259 illegal Chinese migrants. In 2003, the cutter interdicted the fishing vessel Candy I with 4 tons of cocaine. In 2003, the cutter interdicted two "go-fast" boats with 2 tons of cocaine using warning shots across the bow of one with an MH-68 "Stingray" Helicopter Interdiction Tactical Squadron (HITRON). Munro traveled on turbines for 16 hours to intercept the second, using dead reckoning based on the suspect vessel's course and speed to find it. The crew of the second "go-fast" then proceeded to light their vessel on fire to destroy the bales on board the vessel, but Munro's crew quickly sank the vessel and later recovered around 139 bales of cocaine. Four traffickers were recovered, with two needing medical assistance from Munro's corpsman.

From December 2004 to June 2005, Munro operated in the Persian Gulf with the Bonhomme Richard Expeditionary Strike Group. During the Out of Hemisphere patrol, Munro contributed to the relief efforts of the 2004 tsunami, providing food and water to Indonesia and later seizing a vessel overtaken by pirates off the Horn of Africa. In 2006, the cutter interdicted two "go-fast" boats working in tandem with 2 tons of cocaine using disabling shots with an MH-68 "Stingray" HITRON.

As of September 4, 2007, Munro was home-ported in Kodiak, Alaska.

On March 23, 2008, Munro rescued survivors of FV Alaska Ranger when it sank 180 miles (290 km) west of Dutch Harbor. Munro deployed its HH-65 Dolphin helicopter to the sinking site, and received 20 of the surviving fishermen. The story of this rescue is detailed in Deadliest Sea: The Untold Story Behind the Greatest Rescue in Coast Guard History by Kalee Thompson. As Aviation Week & Space Technology states, "The USCG deems the operation the largest cold-water rescue in its history."

Munro was renamed to Douglas Munro to allow the new Legend-class cutter Munro, launched in 2015, to assume the former name of the Hamilton-class cutter.

Douglas Munro also made an appearance in an episode of the Discovery Channel series Deadliest Catch, conducting search-and-rescue operations following the loss of the fishing vessel Ocean Challenger. It was also featured in the BBC series Full Circle with Michael Palin in 1997, as the presenter was on the ship at the end of his documentary circumnavigation of the Pacific Rim.

Douglas Munro completed her final deployment on March 13, 2021, and was decommissioned on April 24, 2021, in a ceremony held at Coast Guard Base Kodiak in Kodiak, Alaska.

== Sri Lanka Navy ==
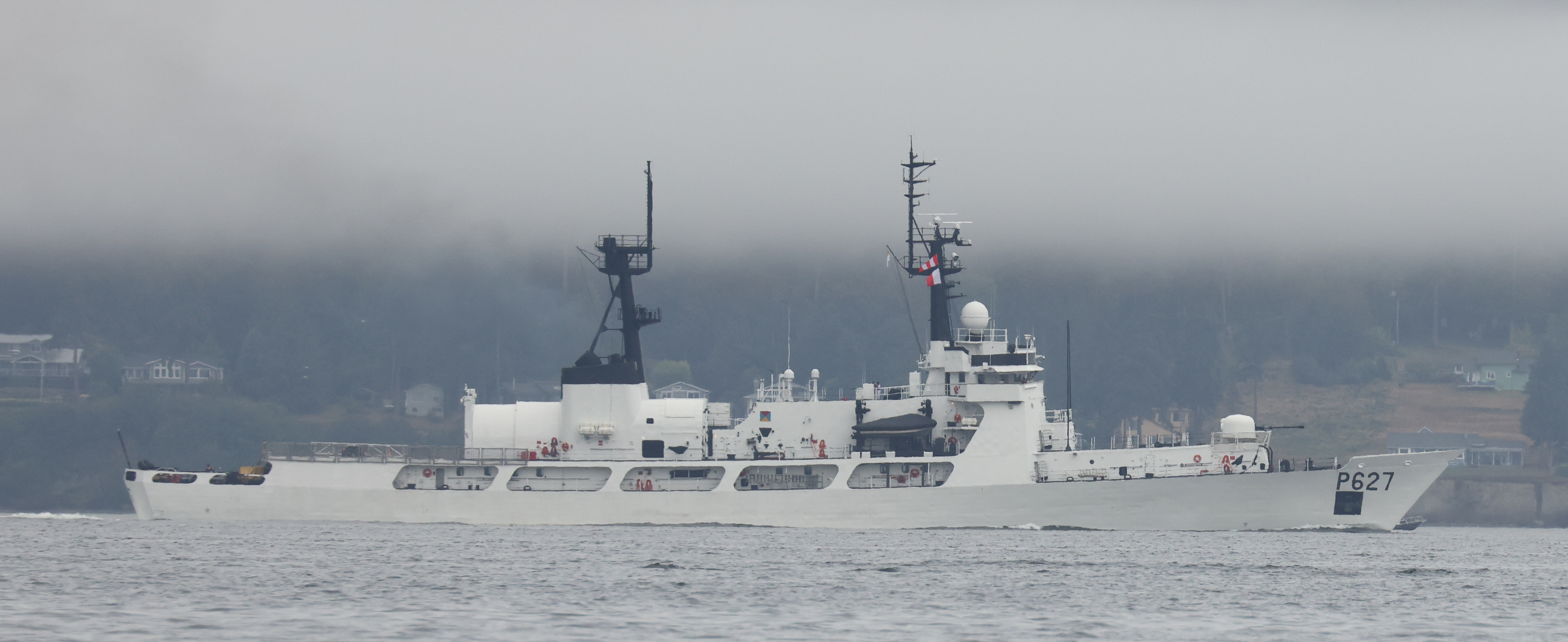
Vijayabahu in Puget Sound, September 2022

Following her decommissioning, she was transferred to the Sri Lanka Navy on October 26, 2021, at USCG Station Seattle, where she was assigned the pennant number P 627. She becomes the second Hamilton-class cutter to be transferred to the Sri Lanka Navy after USCGC Sherman. Like her sister ship, she retained her Otobreda 76 mm gun and MK 92 Fire Control System, while the Phalanx CIWS was removed and was replaced with a rear-mounted dual 23 mm cannon. She underwent an extensive refit at Seattle before sailing to her new home in Sri Lanka, covering a long sea voyage around 10,656 nautical miles (19,735 km) and transiting the Pacific and Indian Oceans. The ship finally arrived in Colombo on November 2, 2022. She was commissioned as SLNS Vijayabahu by President Ranil Wickramasinghe, in the presence of U.S. Ambassador to Sri Lanka Julie Chung on November 20, 2022.

In May 2023, she was deployed to the location of the Lu Peng Yuan Yu sinking with a team of divers to attempt a rescue. The operation did not detect survivors, but was able to recover several bodies.

Vijayabahu participated in the multinational naval exercise AMAN–2025, hosted by the Pakistan Navy from 7 to 11 February 2025 in Karachi, Pakistan.

Between 14 August and 18 August 2025, SLNS Vijayabahu, along with SLNS Gajabahu (P626), participated in the 12th edition of Sri Lanka–India Naval Exercise (SLINEX-25). The edition was hosted by Sri Lanka between 14 and 18 August 2025. The harbour phase was conducted from 14 to 16 August at the Port of Colombo followed by the sea phase on 17 and 18 August. Meanwhile, the Indian Navy was represented by a guided missile destroyer, INS Rana (D52), a replenishment oiler, INS Jyoti (A58). The Indian Navy ships arrived at the port on 14 August. A Special Forces team of both the navies also participated in the exercise. The ships were also complemented by a Sri Lanka Air Force Bell 412 helicopter during the sea phase of the exercise.

== See also ==
- SLNS Gajabahu
- SLNS Parakramabahu
