= Fremantle Highway =

Ro-ro cargo ship burning in 2023 off the coast of the Netherlands

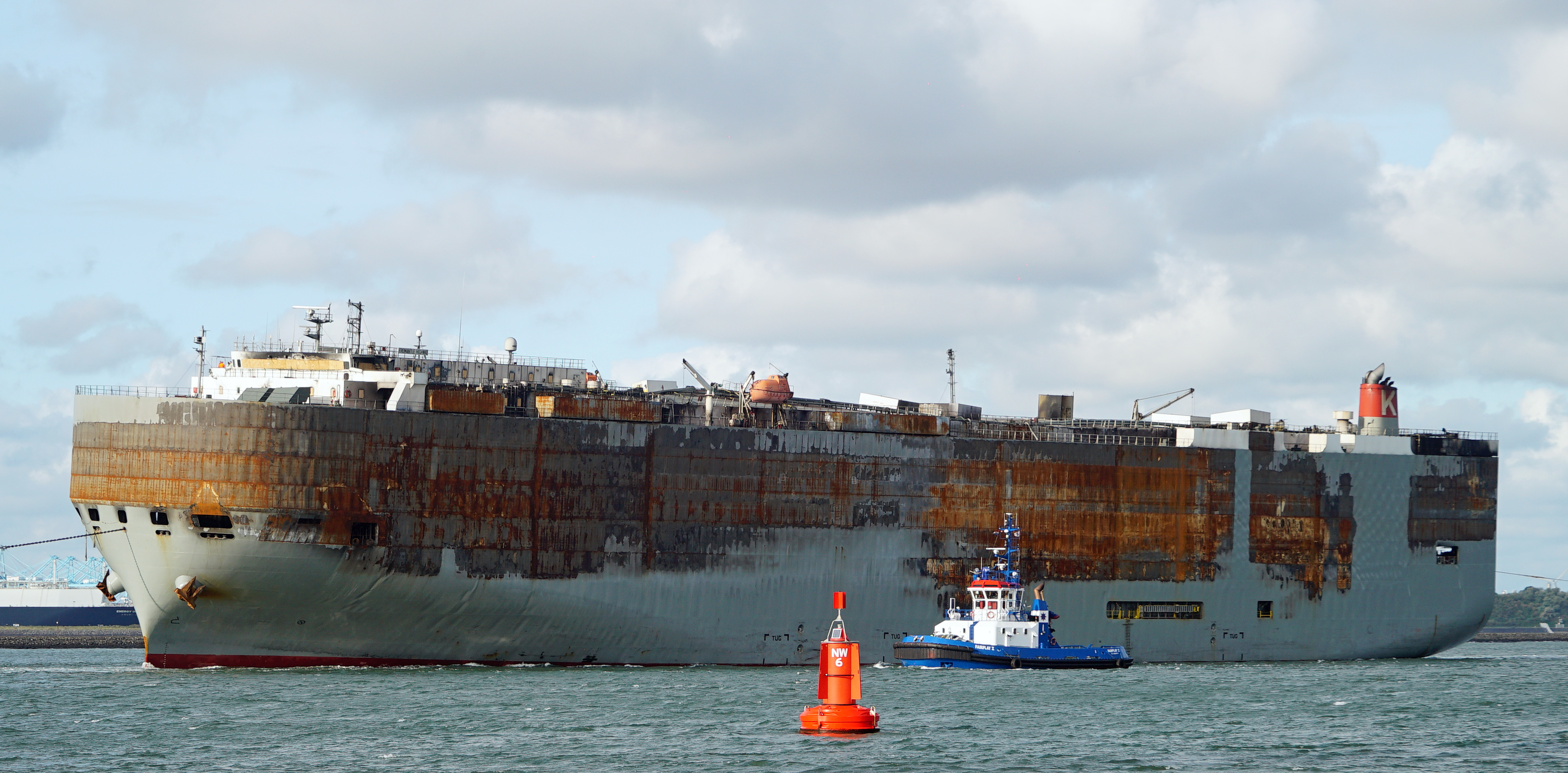
- Fremantle Highway after the 2023 fire

History
- Name: 2013–2024 Fremantle Highway; from 2024 Floor
- Owner: Shoei Kisen
- Operator: K Line
- Builder: Imabari Shipbuilding
- Launched: 30 September 2013
- Identification: IMO number: 9667344; MMSI number: 356651000; Callsign: 3EYO5
- Status: Under repair in China

General characteristics
- Type: Ro-ro/car carrier
- Tonnage: 59,525 GT 18,549 DWT
- Length: 199 m (653 ft)
- Beam: 32 m (105 ft)
- Installed power: 12.240 kW (16.642 PS)
- Propulsion: single shaft, 1 screw
- Speed: 21 kn (39 km/h; 24 mph)
- Capacity: 6,200 cars
- Crew: 23

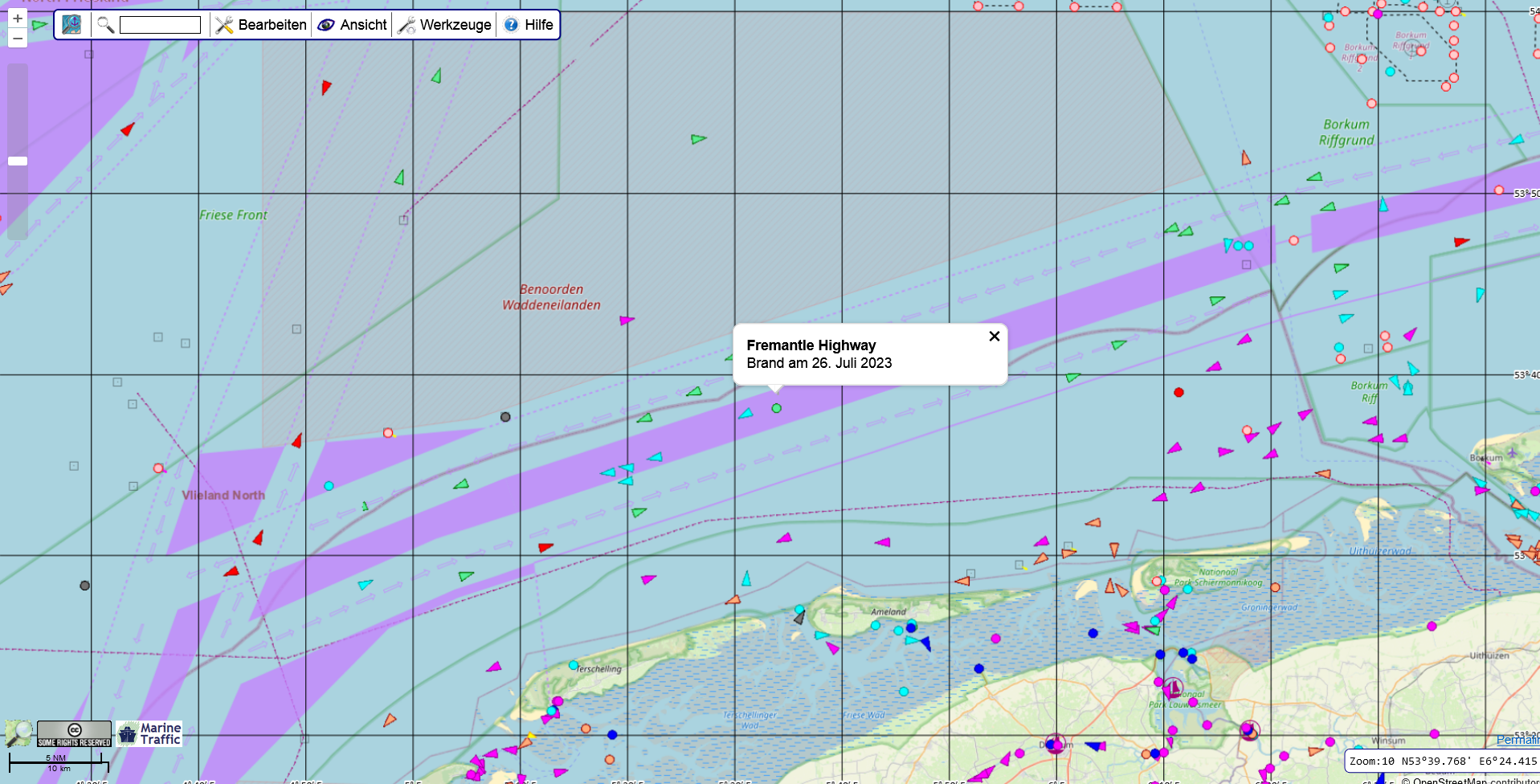
Burning ship location on 27 July 2023

Fremantle Highway is a car carrier owned by the Japanese tonnage provider Shoei Kisen Kaisha, while the vessel is technically managed by Wallem Shipmanagement Japanese and operated by "K"-Line. Fremantle Highway is Panamanian-flagged.

On the night of 25 July 2023, a fire broke out in the loading area of the ship in the North Sea off the coast of the Netherlands. One of the 23-man crew died; the rest were rescued. A salvage operation to prevent sinking and an oil spill lasted until 3 August 2023. The vessel was shipped in 2024 to China for rebuilding, as Floor.

== Design and description ==
The ship, which is 199 m (652 ft 11 in) long with a beam of 32 m (105 ft), is powered by a two-stroke eight-cylinder diesel engine with an output of 12,240 kW (16,410 hp). The engine acts on a propeller. Four diesel generators with a total output of 4,750 kW are available for power generation. A stern ramp on the starboard side and a side ramp approximately in the middle on the starboard side are available for cargo handling. The rear ramp can be loaded with up to 100 t. The maximum ceiling height on the vehicle decks is 5.1 m (17 ft).

== History ==
Fremantle Highway was built in 2013 under the yard number 1617 at the Japanese shipyard Imabari Zōsen. The keel was laid on 17 May and the launch took place on 30 September 2013. She was completed on 17 December 2013.

=== 2023 fire ===
Fremantle Highway caught fire off the coast of the Dutch island of Ameland around 11.45 pm (CET) on 25 July 2023 while en route from Bremerhaven, Germany, due to arrive in Egypt's Port Said on 2 August 2023. K Line and Shoei Kisen Kaisha stated that the ship was bound for Singapore and carried approximately 3,000 cars.

One of the 23-man crew died, while the others were all evacuated on a helicopter and lifeboat by the Netherlands Coastguard. All the seafarers were Indian nationals; 16 of them were injured. Fremantle Highway was subsequently towed out of the main shipping lanes.

The German company BLG stated that they had loaded 2,500 cars and "high and heavy" cargo on Fremantle Highway at the port of Bremerhaven in addition to already loaded cars. On 28 July, it was reported that there were almost 500 electric cars on the ship, which was significantly more than originally assumed, although all were recovered without significant damage and did not contribute to the fire. A total of 3,783 new cars were on the ship, as reported by the Dutch media.

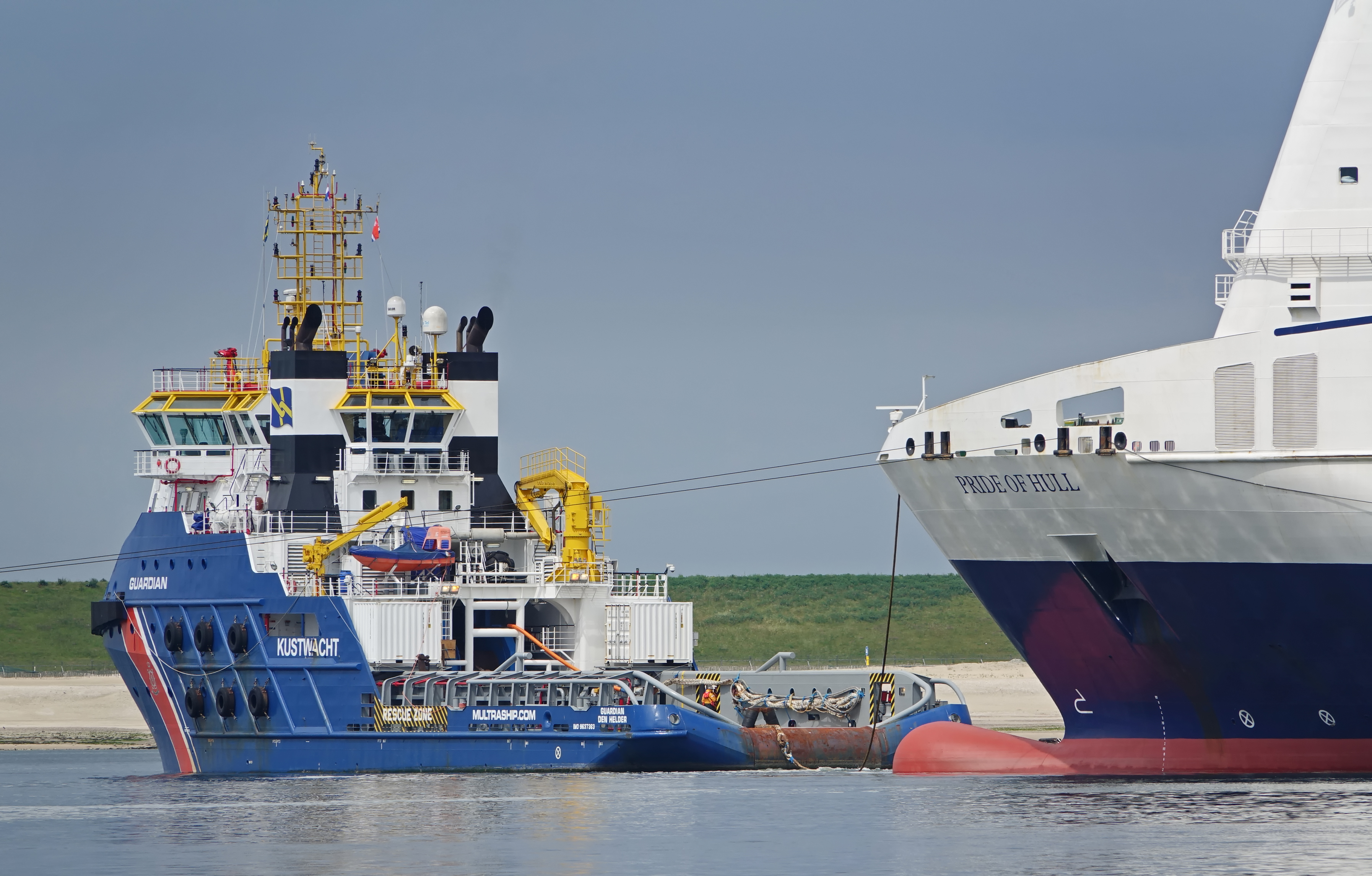
Netherlands Coastguard heavy towboat Guardian was one of the first ships on the scene.

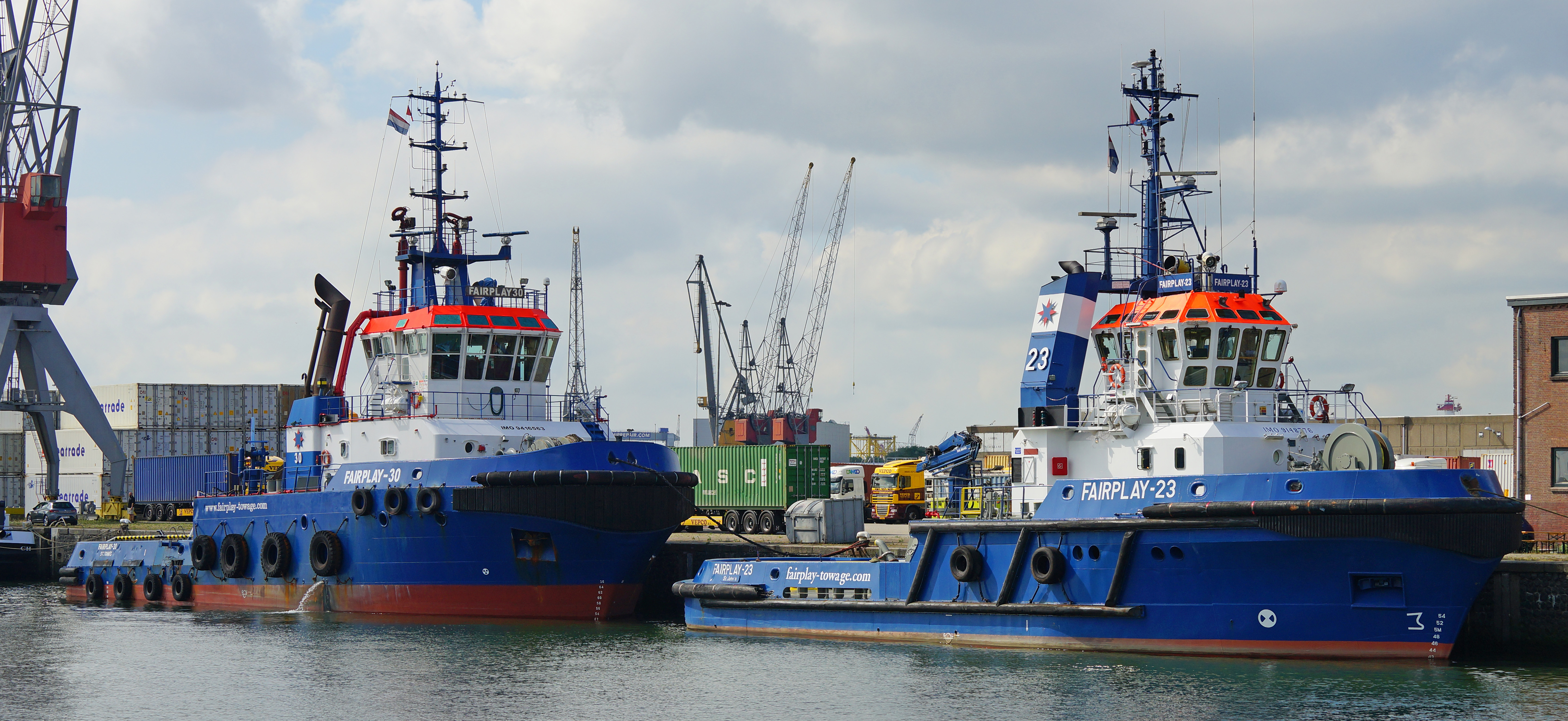
Fairplay-30 (left) was one of the towboats that were controlling and finally towing Fremantle Highway for days.

==== Environmental risks ====
The fire and resulting unmanned ship posed environmental risks to Ameland and the Wadden Sea area spanning the Netherlands, Denmark and Germany, which is a UNESCO World Heritage Site.

According to the German Federal Environment Ministry, there were 1,600 tons of heavy fuel oil (1.6 million litres) and a further 200 tons of marine diesel oil on board as ship bunkers.

==== Salvage operation ====
Dutch and German tugboats and fireboats were ordered to attend to the burning ship, as well as an oil-recovery vessel in case of a leak. The ship was at a position north of the island of Terschelling, between two very busy shipping routes to and from Germany. The salvage operation was led by the Netherlands’ Rijkswaterstaat, joined by the Netherlands Coastguard and salvage companies contracted by the owner, including Dutch heavy lift company Royal Boskalis, and the Dutch company Multraship Towage and Salvage.

Since there was a risk of the ship becoming unstable due to water accumulation, only the bow was cooled with water. A towing connection was established on 28 July. Since the fire broke out, the ship could not be dragged because of the effects of streaming conditions, tide and wind to the 199 m long and 30 m (98 ft 5 in) high ship. However, the position could be altered by the tugboats Fairplay-30 and others.

On 29 July, Fremantle Highway was towed away from its dangerous berth, eastward off the Wadden Sea island of Schiermonnikoog. Strong south-westerly winds blew smoke from the cargo ship directly over the tug. The authorities temporarily stopped the operation.

On the afternoon of 30 July, two tugs managed to start towing to the provisional sea position north of Schiermonnikoog. The ship remained there until a port was found. The still-burning freighter arrived at its new provisional anchorage around midday on 31 July after a risky transport along the Wadden Sea islands.

On 1 August, a team of experts went on board of Fremantle Highway and deemed there were no remaining visible fires and that the hull of the ship was in an acceptable condition. That night, the wind picked up and the waves got bigger. It became more difficult for the salvage team to keep the ship in position. Another towing connection was fitted on 2 August to connect the ship to tugs from the front and from the rear. The CEO of the salvage company Boskalis warned that enormous forces were already acting on the ship's high flanks. If the wind got any stronger, there was a risk that the ship would no longer be controllable. The north-west wind forecast for the following days would drive the ship towards the coast, said Peter Berdowski of Boskalis. The company wanted the ship to move to the port of Eemshaven on short notice, which was the closest to reach.

Wind forces of 7 to 8 Beaufort were forecasted for the first weekend in August 2023. The high hull and thus very large surface wind attack surface caused the Dutch Minister of Infrastructure and Water Management, Mark Harbers, to have the ship towed to the port of Eemshaven, 64 km (40 mi) away from the latest holding position. The towing operation began on the morning of 3 August around 5 am. The towing convoy with the wrecked ship arrived there at noon.

==== Investigations ====
Initial news reports speculated that the fire was caused by electric car The Dutch coastguard said on its website that the cause of the fire was unknown, but an emergency responder is heard in a recording released by Dutch broadcaster RTL saying, "The fire started in the battery of an electric car". Ship charter company "K" Line said that there were 3,783 vehicles on board the ship - including 498 battery electric vehicles, significantly more than the 25 initially reported.

The cause of the fire has not been definitively established, but salvage company Boskalis said that the electric cars appear to be in good condition . Investigations started when the ship was moored in Eemshaven.

==== Reactions ====
A spokesperson for the International Maritime Organization (IMO) said that, in light of the growing number of fires on cargo ships, IMO will announce new safety standards for those transporting electric vehicles in 2024. The guidelines could include specifications on how fully a battery can be charged. The IMO said that chemicals for extinguishing fires, special fire blankets, equipment such as battery-penetrating jet extinguishers, and bigger gaps left between electric vehicles on ships, could also become mandatory.

Christian Meyer, minister for the environment of Lower Saxony, a German coastline state, demanded better safety and environmental standards for commercial ships. High-risk ships should not take any coastal routes and thus endanger the Wadden Sea National Park. Meyer recalled the past ship disasters with the MSC Zoe, in which several containers fell overboard and landed near Borkum in 2019, and the Pallas, which was wrecked off the German island of Amrum in 1998.

German nature conservation organization NABU demanded that the protection of the Wadden Sea should have priority over economic interests. They also stated that maritime traffic had to be reorganized around marine protected areas in order to comply with the EU biodiversity strategy, and that the transport of battery-powered vehicles had to be carried out under much stricter transport and fire protection regulations. Germany should play an active advocate for these regulations at the IMO in cooperation with the Netherlands and Denmark.

Politicians of the Wadden Sea islands and nature conservationists are demanding that the southern route into the German Bight, which runs through the Wadden Sea, be closed to dangerous transport.

=== Rebuild ===
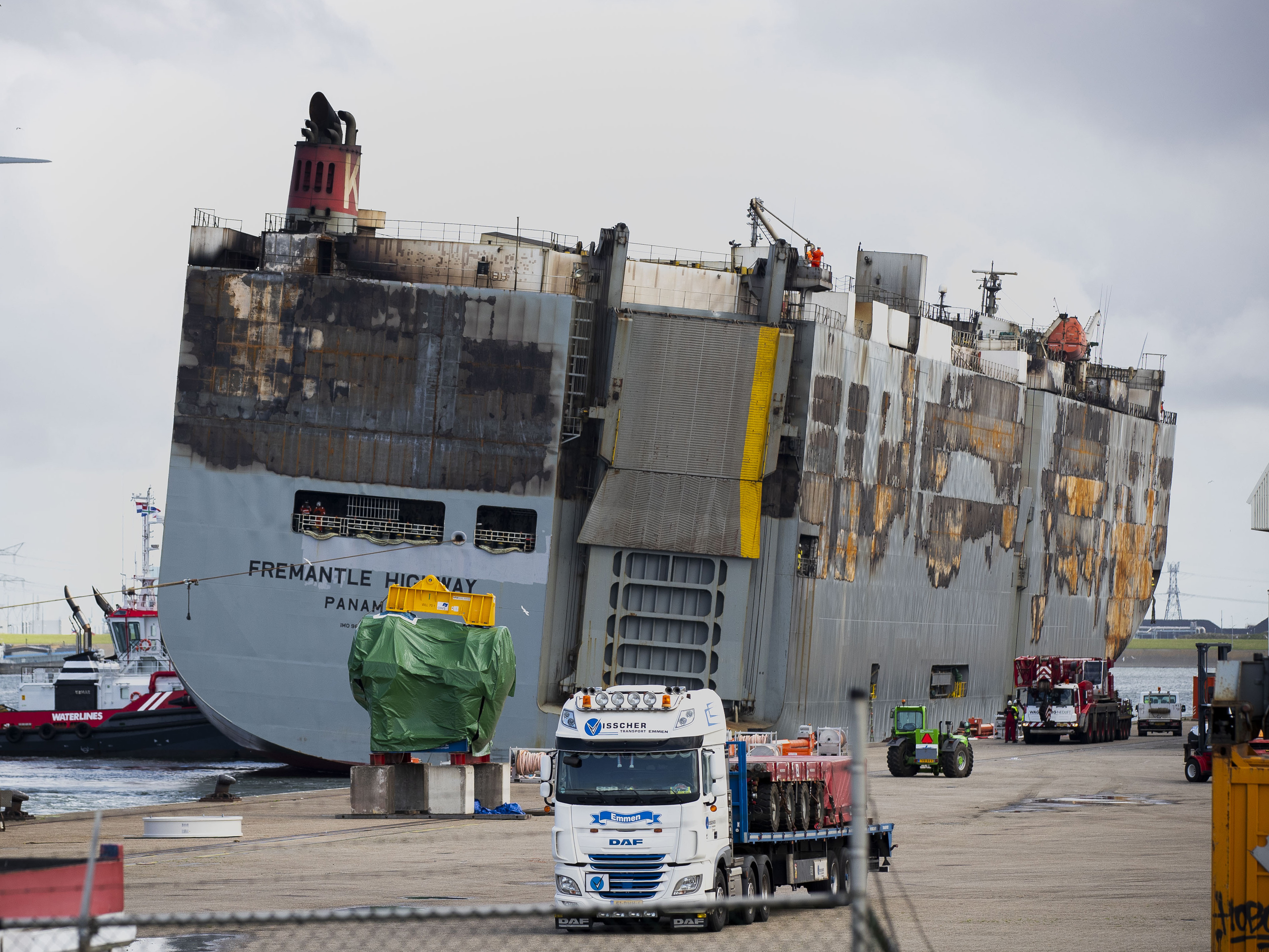
Fremantle Highway at Eemshaven

After the ship's cargo was unloaded in Eemshaven, the Japanese shipping company wanted to clarify in August 2023 whether the ship could be repaired or whether it had to be scrapped. Following the first sightings in Eemshaven, insurance companies were assuming that the freight was a total loss. It was estimated at around 300 million euros. However assessment by a salvage contractor showed that decks 1 to 5 and the engine room were unaffected.

On 19 August 2023, the unburned vehicles from the lower decks began to be disembarked. Before leaving the ship, the cars were washed to remove any remaining pollutants.

On 8 September 2023, Boskalis reported that the ship had been returned to its owner.

Later the ship was bought by Koole Contractors from the insurer at a price of €1.

The ship was towed to Rotterdam, where it arrived on 23 September 2023. There the ship was cleaned and about a third of the ship was dismantled, including most of the upper decks. Around 2800 burned car wrecks were removed from the ship.

In the meantime the ship was bought by Qingshan Shipyard Group of Xiamen, China for €11 million, and renamed to Floor. In October 2024, the ship was placed upon the semi-submersable salvage ship Boka Vanguard and transported to China, where new upper-decks will be built. Due to a global shortage of car carriers, the one-year rebuild would be cost effective compared to €100 million and 4 years of build time for a new car carrier. The vessel is expected to return to service in 2025.

== See also ==
- List of shipwrecks in 2023
- List of roll-on/roll-off vessel accidents
- Felicity Ace, a car carrier that caught fire and sank in 2022
