= FV Alaska Ranger =

American fishing factory ship launched 1973 sunk 2008

Coordinates: 53°53′N 169°58′W

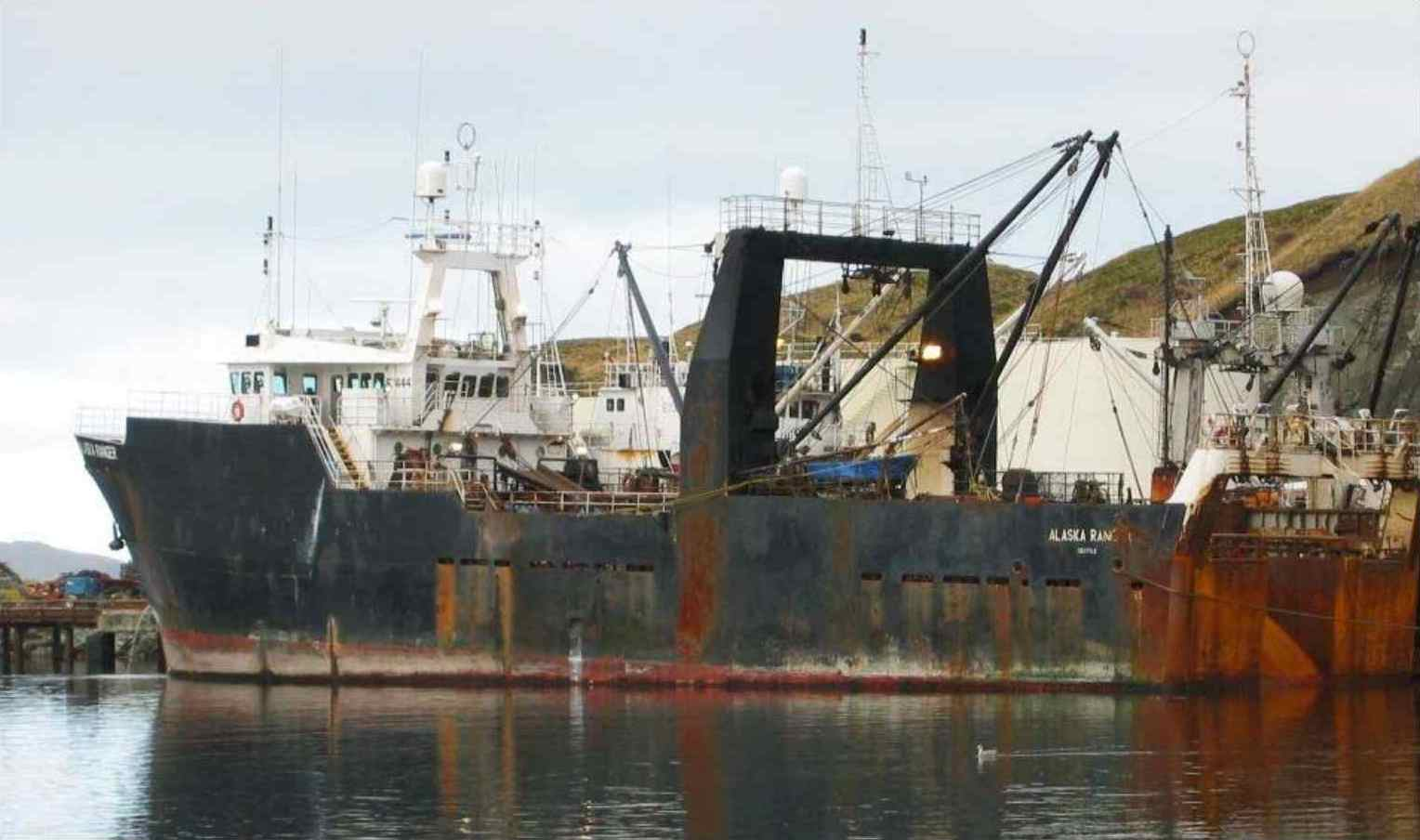
- Fishing Vessel Alaska Ranger

History

- Name: Ranger, renamed Alaska Ranger
- Owner: Fishing Company of Alaska
- Port of registry: Seattle, Washington, United States
- Builder: McDermott Shipbuilding Company, Morgan City, Louisiana
- Yard number: 182
- Completed: 1973
- Fate: Sunk 23 March 2008 180 miles west of Dutch Harbor
- Notes: IMO number: 7303970

General characteristics
- Tonnage: 1,577 GT (ITC)
- Length: 189.4 ft (57.7 m)
- Beam: 40.0 ft (12.2 m)
- Draft: 28.0 ft (8.5 m)
- Crew: 47 (at time of sinking)
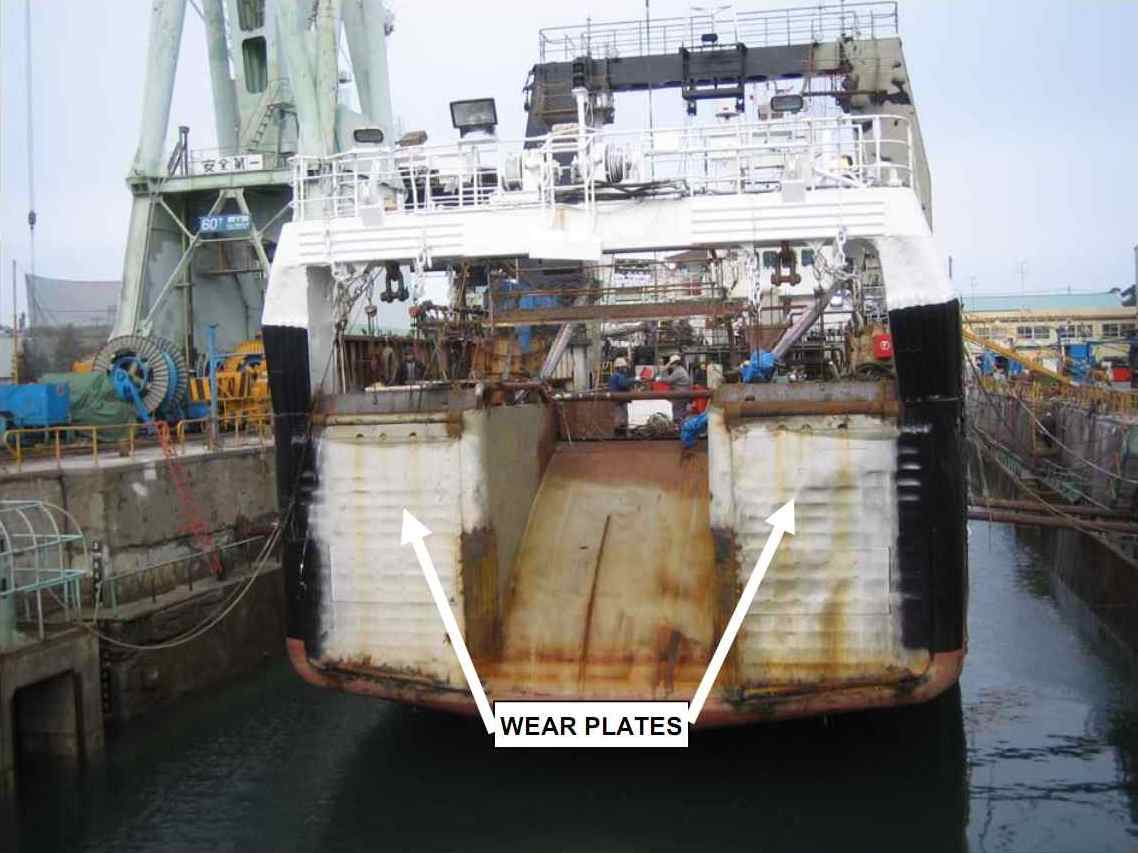
- Wear plates fitted over stern of Alaska Ranger, shown in 2005. Stern ramp in the center allowed nets to be launched into the sea and then hauled on board with their catch.

FV Alaska Ranger was a fishing factory ship owned and operated by the Fishing Company of Alaska of Seattle, Washington. The ship was constructed in 1973 for use as an oil field service vessel. The ship sank 23 March 2008, after reporting progressive flooding only hours earlier. Of the 47 on board, 42 were rescued. Of the five fatalities, four were recovered dead, and one was never found. The Coast Guard was initially misinformed about the number of persons on board the vessel, and secured the search with one crew member still unaccounted for. After realizing there was still one person missing, the Coast Guard reinstated the search, but did not find the crew member.

== Sinking ==
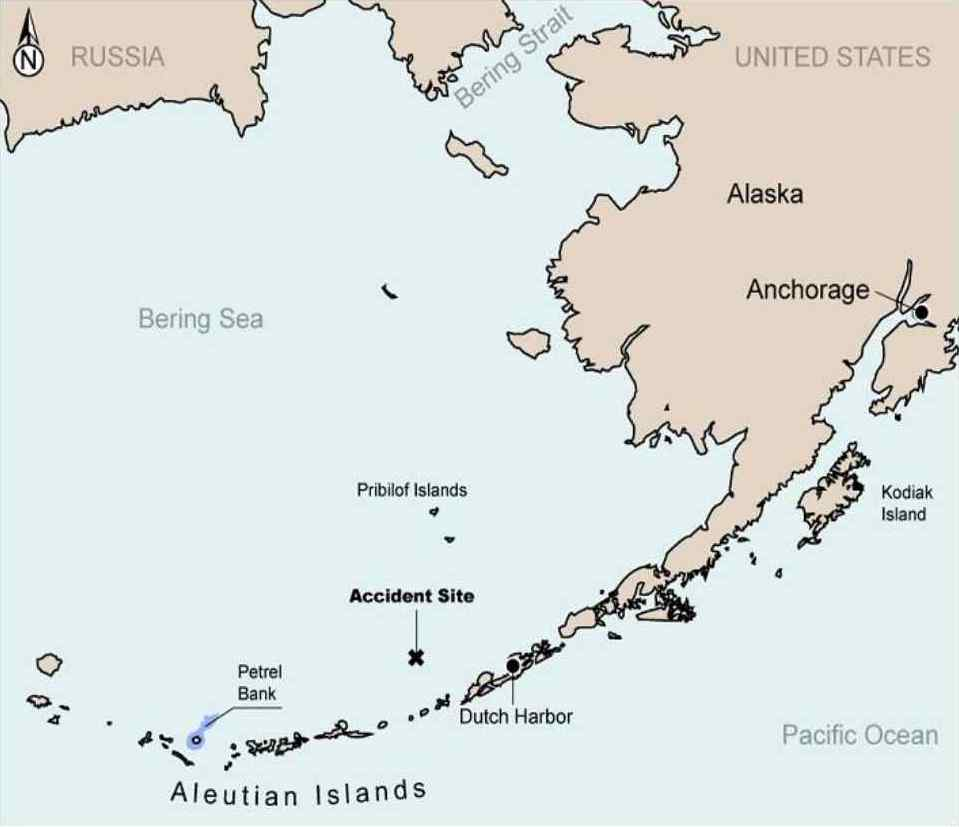
Location of Alaskan Ranger sinking.

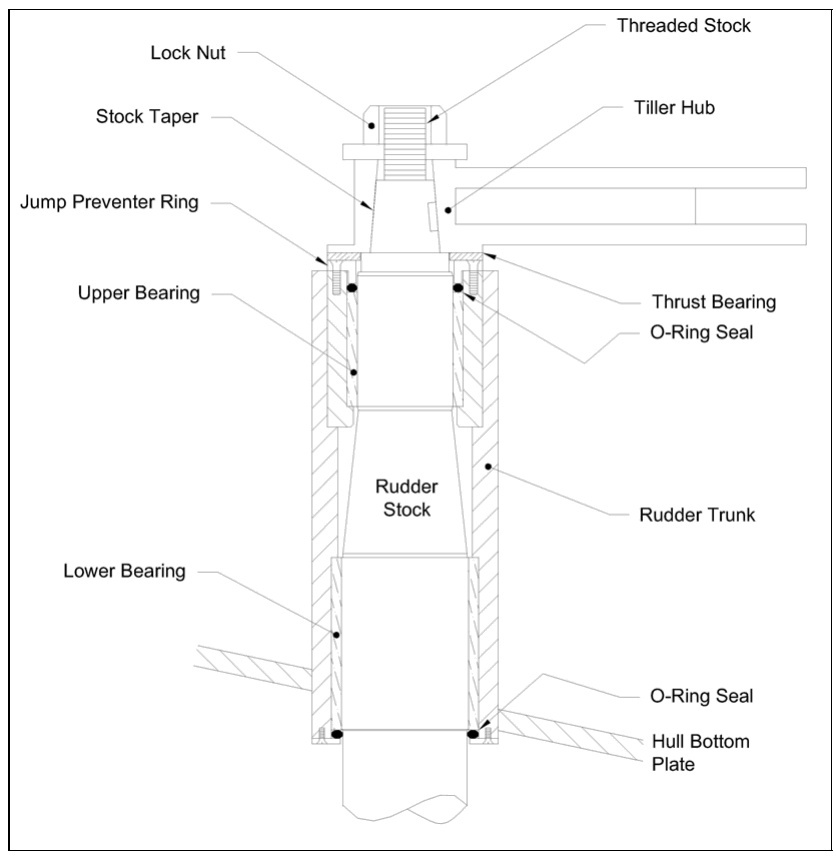
Section view of Alaska Ranger rudder assembly, developed from original ship’s drawings. The rudder assembly extended about 5 feet above the hull bottom plate.

According to the United States NTSB (National Transportation Safety Board), the triggering event in the sinking was the loss of one of the two rudders. This allowed water to pour into the rudder room by way of the 9-inch diameter rudder trunk. The marine architect designed the opening of the rudder trunks to be above the waterline so that water would not enter the rudder room should a rudder fall out. However, United Marine Shipbuilding changed the ship from an oil well service vessel to a fishing vessel in 1988. The changes raised the waterline 2.5 feet. This put the rudder trunk openings below the water line. The ceiling of the rudder room was only 20 inches above the trunk openings.

Flooding of the rudder room should not have sunk the ship since there was a watertight bulkhead. The NTSB can only speculate that the door was left open, the seals or latching dogs failed, or that the holes cut in the bulkhead for refrigeration lines needed for fish processing were not watertight. If the conversion had installed a watertight bulkhead between sections of the fish processing area the ship would not have sunk.

Whatever the reason, the water flooded the engine room. At some point the water level became high enough to short out the main electrical distribution panel. This caused the loss of electrical power throughout the ship.

Other experts suspect that modifications made to the housing surrounding the propeller failed due to poor installing causing the rapid flooding. Evidence of the failure is shown through maintenance records indicating multiple repairs on the propeller housing where it joins the hull.

The ship had variable-pitch propellers. This means the captain can keep the diesel engines at a constant RPM needed for the AC electrical generators, and use the variable pitch to change vessel speed or reverse direction. The variable-pitch propellers used a hydraulic actuation system. As designed, there was one electrical hydraulic pump and one engine-driven mechanical hydraulic pump for each propeller. In 1989, Transmarine Propulsion Systems replaced both mechanical pumps with electric pumps, saying they could not get parts for the mechanical pumps.

With electrical power lost, all 4 hydraulic pumps stopped. With no hydraulic pressure, hydrodynamic forces on the propellers caused the pitch to reverse. This made the ship run full astern. The rearward motion of the vessel drove the sinking aft section further under water. It also exacerbated water entry into the air intake vents on the trawl deck.

The captain of Alaska Ranger died in the sinking, so it is unknown why he did not stop the diesel engines. The Coast Guard had tested the engine emergency shutoff system a year before the sinking and reported that it functioned properly. The vessel moving full astern meant that two of the three inflatable liferafts were separated from the ship. This meant that 25 crew members that had jumped into the water never got to one of the three liferafts.

=== United States Coast Guard Marine Board of Investigation ===
The United States Coast Guard also investigated the sinking through a Marine Board of Investigation. The Marine Board's Report of Investigation determined a different scenario related to the cause of the casualty. The Marine Board reviewed thousands of pages of documents and photographs related to the maintenance and repair of the vessel, and examined in-depth the installation of the Kort nozzles. The Marine Board also examined in detail the rudder installation.

As a result of this analysis the report concluded that

"Though the exact initiating event that created the source of flooding is unknown, it was likely related to the poor material condition of the vessel and may have been related to the Kort nozzle struts which are believed to have experienced excessive stresses where they were attached to the hull."

The report added that the owners of the ship "failed to properly maintain the structural condition of the Alaska Ranger".

== Crew rescue ==
The unexpected and unexplained flooding of the ship meant that the crew had to abandon the vessel at night, into the frigid waters of the Bering Sea. Radio pleas for help were forwarded to a US Coast Guard vessel, which moved toward the area while dispatching helicopters. By the end of the effort, 42 of the 47-person crew had been located and brought safely to shore, most suffering severe hypothermia.

The rescue was carried out by a USCG HH-60 Jayhawk which was stationed on Saint Paul Island, AK and a HH-65 Dolphin which was attached to the USCGC Douglas Munro, which rescued 20 people, and 22 were rescued by Alaska Ranger’s sister ship FV Alaska Warrior. The ship sank 180 miles west of Dutch Harbor.

Aviation Week & Space Technology magazine awarded its 2009 Aviation Week Heroism Award to the U.S. Coast Guard Rescue Team involved in this rescue operation, stating: "The two helicopter crews displayed exceptional risk mitigation and airmanship in fighting time, distance and weather – including snow squalls, a −24°F wind chill, 15 ft seas and 30 kt winds – to rescue survivors. The USCG deems the operation the largest cold-water rescue in its history."

== In pop culture ==
The story of the sinking and subsequent rescue was published in 2010 as Deadliest Sea: The Untold Story Behind the Greatest Rescue in Coast Guard History by Kalee Thompson.

A brief version of the Alaska Ranger story was told at the conclusion of the Deadliest Catch season 4 finale.

A Discovery Channel program Mayday! Bering Sea covers the accident and rescue.

Featured in season 1, episode 5 of Disasters at Sea-Shipwrecked in Alaska that aired on Quest (UK) and Smithsonian (US).

== Ship layout ==
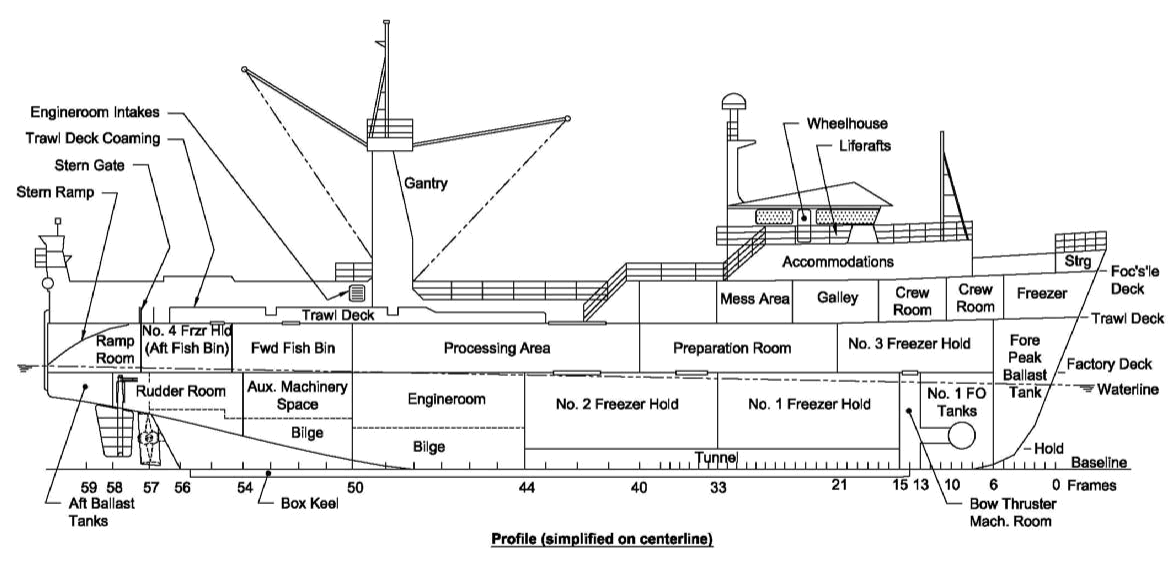
Profile view of Alaska Ranger. Flooding involved the aft compartments on the hold and factory decks. Most crewmembers were asleep in quarters on the foc’s’le and forward trawl decks when flooding began. Life rafts were stored next to the wheelhouse above the foc’s’le deck. (FO means fuel oil.)
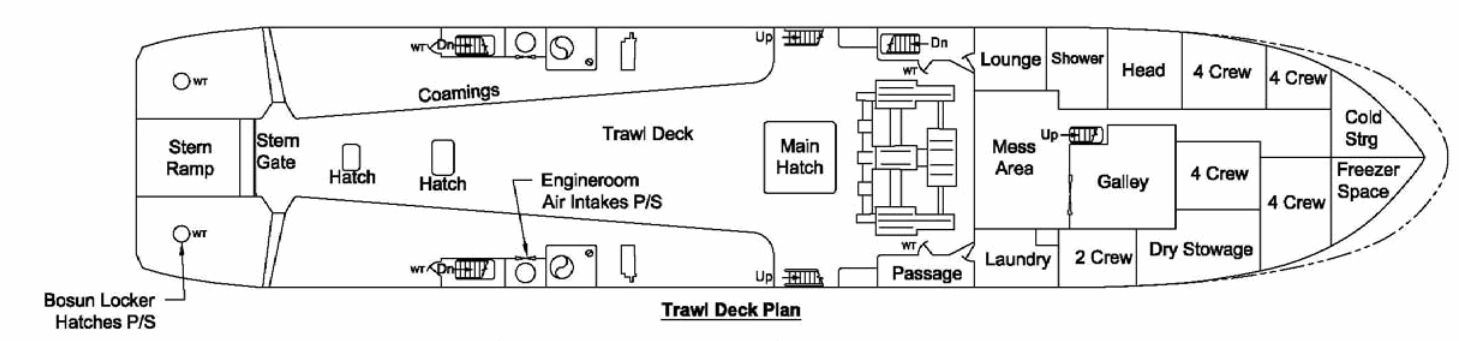
Plan view of Alaska Ranger trawl deck. (P/S means port and starboard; WT means watertight)
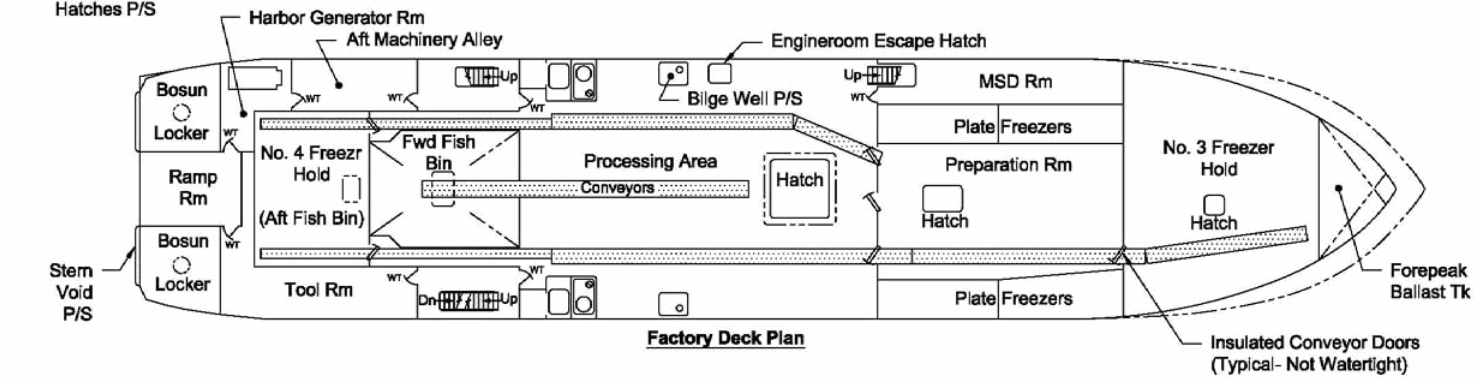
Plan view of Alaska Ranger factory deck. (MSD means marine sanitation device; P/S means port and starboard; Tk means tank; WT means watertight)
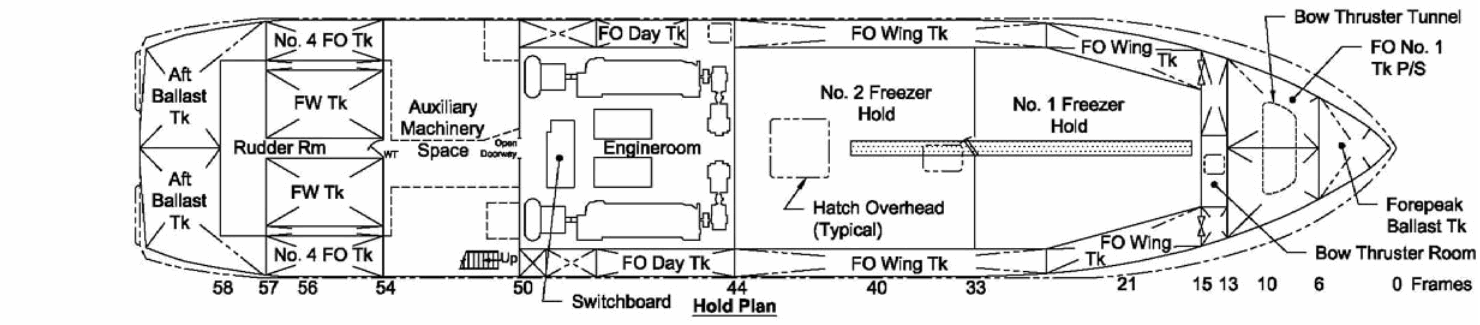
Plan view of Alaska Ranger hold. (FW means fresh water; FO means fuel oil; Tk means tank; WT means watertight)
