= Lu Peng Yuan Yu sinking =

2023 sinking of a Chinese fishing boat in the Indian Ocean

Sinking of Lu Peng Yuan Yu 028
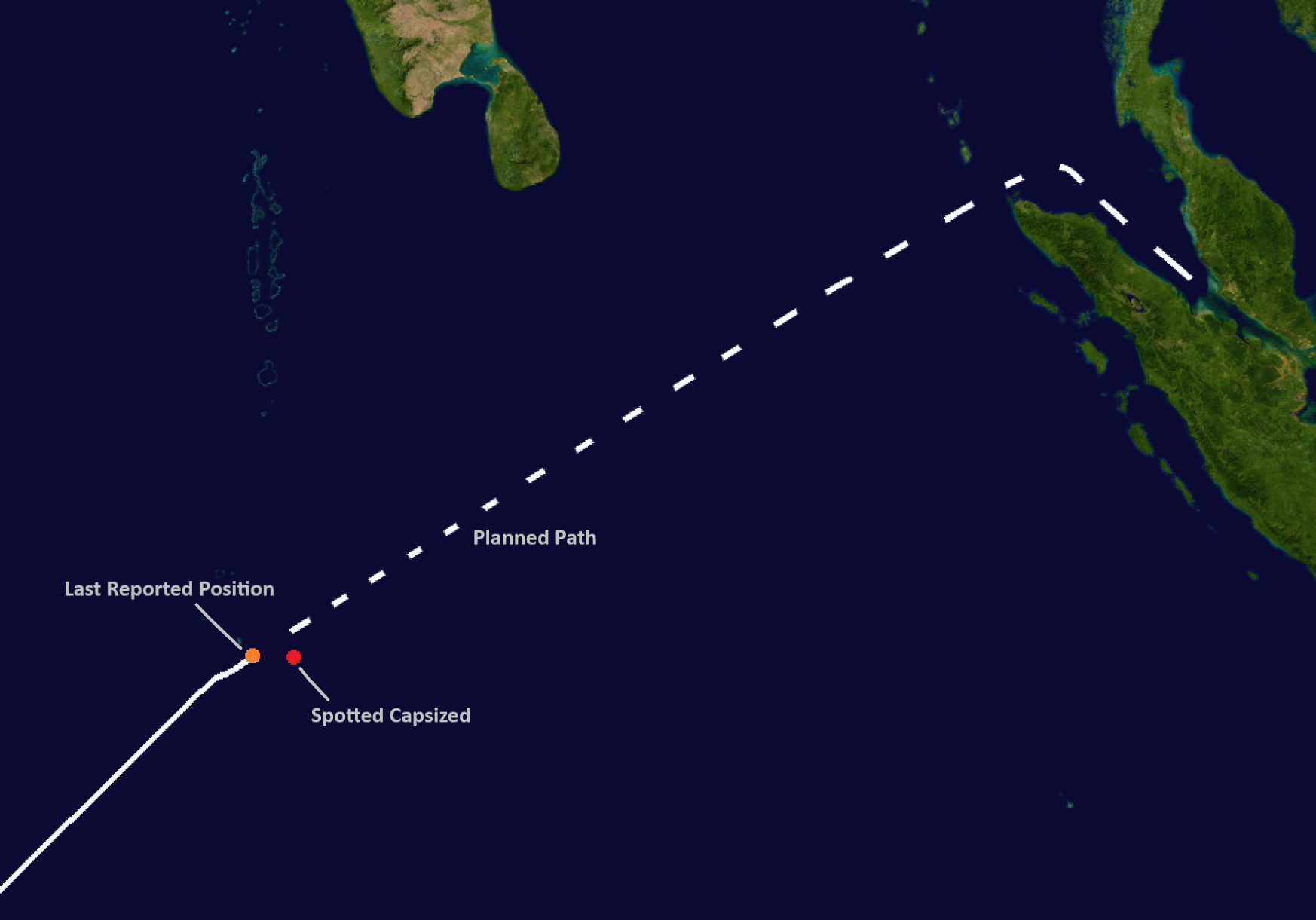
- Path of the Lu Peng Yuan Yu
- Date: 16 May 2023
- Time: ~3:00 A.M. CST (~7:00 P.M. GMT on 15 May)
- Location: Central Indian Ocean, south of Sri Lanka
- Type: Capsizing
- Cause: Cyclone Fabien
- Deaths: 16
- Missing: 23

On 16 May 2023, a Chinese fishing boat sank in the Indian Ocean, killing 16 people and leaving 23 missing. The boat, the Lu Peng Yuan Yu 028 (Chinese: 鲁蓬远渔028), was operating in the central Indian Ocean, about 1,000 kilometers (620 miles) south of Sri Lanka. The boat was carrying a crew of 17 Chinese nationals, 17 Indonesian nationals, and 5 Filipino nationals.

The boat capsized around 3:00 A.M. CST (7:00 P.M. GMT on 15 May) during 7 m (23 ft) waves while Cyclone Fabien passed over the area. The remains of two people were found two days after the sinking while 37 people still remain missing. No survivors have been reported.

== Reactions and search ==
General Secretary of the Chinese Communist Party Xi Jinping instructed the Ministry of Transport to maximize rescue efforts. In a tweet, Bongbong Marcos expressed his sympathies to the victims' families and pledged them of assistance. The Philippine Coast Guard expressed condolences and promised aid to the families of Filipino sailors who perished.

On 22 May, Sri Lanka Navy divers from the SLNS Vijayabahu (P627) recovered two bodies from the captain's cabin and accommodation area and they were handed over to the Tug De Tian on scene. Navy divers also located 12 more bodies of the crew from various compartments of the vessel.

== See also ==
- MV Derbyshire – a British oil carrier that sunk during Typhoon Orchid in 1980.
- F/V Andrea Gail – an American fishing vessel that was lost at sea during the Perfect Storm in 1991
- MV Princess of the Stars – a passenger vessel that capsized as Typhoon Fengshen passed over the Philippines in 2008.
- SS El Faro – a cargo ship that sunk in the eyewall of Hurricane Joaquin in 2015.
- Bourbon Rhode – a tugboat that sunk during the passage of Hurricane Lorenzo in 2019.
- Gulf Livestock 1 – a livestock carrier that capsized during Typhoon Maysak in 2020.
- LV Lien Sheng Fa – a Taiwanese fishing boat that capsized during Cyclone Freddy just three months prior.
- M/V Los Llanitos – a Mexican bulk carrier that was grounded in its country of origin during Hurricane Patricia in 2015.
- SS Central America – an American sidewheel steamer that sank during a hurricane in 1857.
