= MV TQ Ordu =

Turkish cargo ship

History
- Name: TQ Ordu
- Owner: Turkey
- Port of registry: Palau
- Laid down: 25 June 1999
- Launched: 29 May 2000
- Completed: 22 July 2000
- Identification: IMO number: 9199206; MMSI number: 271050995; Call sign: TCA7340

General characteristics
- Type: Dry goods bulk carrier
- Tonnage: 46,541 DWT
- Length: 183 m (600 ft 5 in)
- Beam: 31 m (101 ft 8 in)
- Draught: 11 m (36 ft 1 in)

MV TQ Ordu is a Turkish-owned, Palau-flagged cargo ship that ran aground in 2023 while in the Black Sea.

== Description ==
The ship is a Supramax-size dry goods bulk carrier with a deadweight tonnage of 46,541. It has an overall length of 183 m (600 ft), a width of 31 m (102 ft), and a draft of 11 m (36 ft). TQ Ordu is powered by one diesel engine which supplies 7,487 kW (10,040 hp) of power to a single screw propeller, for an average speed of 16.2 knots.

== History ==
The ship was built as Zilos in 2000 by Oshima Shipbuilding in Japan. Its keel was laid down on 25 June 1999, the ship was launched on 29 May 2000, and construction work finished on 22 July. The ship was renamed to Los Vilos, and then again to its current name of TQ Ordu.

On 5 February 2023, TQ Ordu was sailing along the northern coast of Turkey in the Black Sea, on its way from Ereğli to Istanbul. While the ship was underway, severe winter weather developed with thirteen to nineteen foot wave swells and winds of up to thirty knots. At around 2330 local time, the ship was driven aground at Şile. it did not request immediate assistance, and none of its 23 crewmembers were injured. A rescue team was assembled on the shore, and coast guard ships were sent to the grounded ship as a precautionary measure.
