= MV Verity =

British Cargo ship

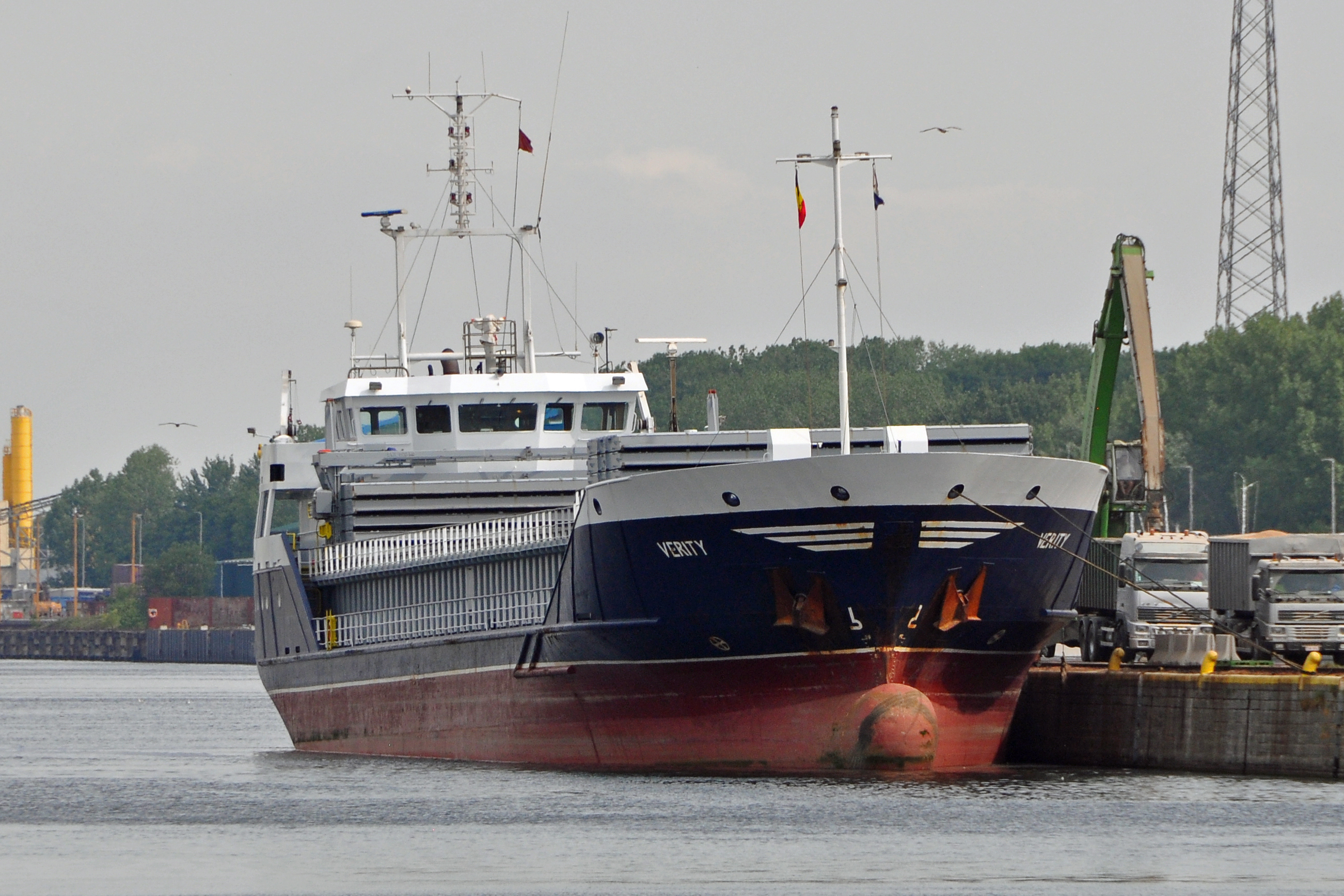
- Verity at Bruges in 2020

History

United Kingdom
- Name: Verity
- Owner: Faversham Ships Ltd. (2023)
- Operator: Faversham Ships Ltd.
- Port of registry: Douglas, Isle of Man
- Builder: Tille Shipyards, Kootstertille, Netherlands
- Yard number: 336
- Launched: 20 April 2001
- Completed: 9 June 2001
- In service: 2001
- Out of service: 2023
- Identification: IMO number: 9229178
- Fate: Sunk in collision, 24 October 2023, salvaged and scrapped in 2024

General characteristics
- Type: Cargo ship
- Tonnage: 2,601 GT and 1,428 NT
- Length: 91.3 m (299.4 ft)
- Beam: 13.7 m (45.1 ft)
- Draught: 5.2 m (17.1 ft)
- Depth: 7.9 m (26 ft)
- Installed power: 1,710 kW (2,293 hp)
- Propulsion: Single propeller MaK Caterpillar engine, 2 x bow thrusters
- Speed: 12.6 knots (23.3 km/h; 14.5 mph)
- Capacity: 5,168 m^{3} (182,500 cu ft)
- Crew: Approximately 7

MV Verity was a British cargo ship built in 2001 under the name Estime. She was renamed to Union Mercury in 2004, Veqxui in 2008 and finally Verity in 2017. She had a typical general cargo ship design, though she was strengthened for heavy cargo up to 15 tonnes per square metre (1.4 long ton/sq ft). She had two bulkheads, dividing her single cargo hatch, with six different lockable locations. This made her suitable to carry any grain. Additionally, she could carry 1,533 t (1,509 long tons) of ballast, and 284.72 t (280.22 long tons) of fuel.

== Career and sinking ==
On 28 January 2016, the Verity's engine had failed, rendering her crippled at sea. She began drifting towards the Devon coast, towards Hartland Point. The following day, she was taken under tow by HNLMS De Ruyter, before changing to be towed by the tugboat Bremen Fighter to Swansea.

On 23 October 2023 at 7:07 PM UTC time, the ship departed Bremen, Germany, en route for Immingham, England. On 24 October, around 2:55 AM UTC, the cargo ship Polesie collided with the starboard side of Verity, which sunk with two survivors, one confirmed dead and four reported missing.

On 30 August 2024, the stern of the ship was raised. Her bow half was raised on 3 September. During the operation, two more bodies were recovered, leaving two crew members unaccounted for.

After salvaging the ship was transported in parts to Rotterdam for recycling. The scrapping of the ship was completed in November 2024.
