= Bombay (ship) =

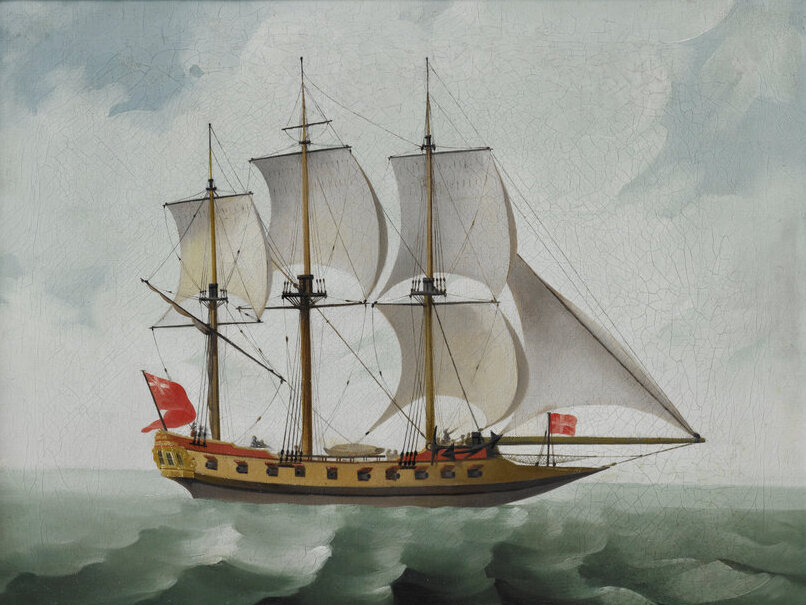
c. 1780 illustration of the Bombay Marine grab HCS Bombay

Several ships have been named after Bombay (now Mumbai):

- Bombay c. 1700 – Merchant ship of the British East India Company attacked by Kanhoji Angre
- HCS Bombay was a 90-foot (27 m), 24-gun grab launched in 1739 and burnt by accident in 1789 at Bombay. She was built at the Bombay Dockyard of teak from Malabar for the British East India Company's naval forces. She was the second largest ship in the EIC's Bombay Marine at the time.
- Bombay 1742 – Sloop of the Bengal Pilot Service as a non-combatant vessel
- Bombay 1750 – Grab armed 90-foot (27 m) cruiser of 32 guns
- Bombay: frigate launched in 1793 at Bombay Dockyard; of 639 or 693 tons (bm), and 38 or 42 guns. Sold to the Admiralty in 1805, renamed HMS Ceylon in 1808, and broken up in 1861.
- Bombay (1801 ship) was launched at Daman/Demaun. Her early career is obscure. From 1821 on she assumed Calcutta registry. Between 1832 and 1840 she made three voyages from London as a whaler. In 1842 she carried settlers for the New Zealand Company. She was last listed in 1853.
- Bombay (1808 EIC ship) was an East Indiaman launched at Bombay Dockyard 8; of 1,228 or 1,242 tons (bm) and 26 guns. Traded with China and fought at the Malacca Straits in 1810. Sold for a hulk in 1860 and was broken up in Bombay in 1870.
- Bombay 1821 – Gunboat of the British East India Company
- Bombay 1835 – 62-ton (bm) schooner involved in coastal trade
- Bombay 1859 East Indiaman, built for owners J. Kerr of Greenock, by Archibald Macmillan & Son of Dumbarton. 890 net tons.
- Bombay a 937-ton, fully rigged ship with dimensions of 186 feet (57 m) x 33 ft 4 in (10.16 m) x 20 feet (6.1 m). Built in Harwich, England by John Henry Vaux, and was the second ship owned by G. D. Tyser and his sons (company Tyser and Haviside). It was then chartered to Shaw Savill. It undertook several trips to New Zealand from London in the 1860s. That included taking emigrants from London to Auckland, who settled in the Bombay Hills region. In 1872, the ship was wrecked on a reef in the Balabac Strait, Philippines.
- Bombay 1872–1905 – Light vessel at the outer limits of Bombay Harbour
- SS Bombay 1889. A steamship built for the P & O Company in 1889; 349 ft (106 m) length and a tonnage of 3,168. There was a fire at the ship while she lay at the Royal Albert Dock in March 1900.

== See also ==
- HMS Bombay
- HMIS Bombay
- INS Bombay
- INS Mumbai
