= INS Bombay =

The following ships of the Indian Navy have been named for Bombay:

- HMIS Bombay (J249) was a Bathurst-class corvette of the Royal Indian Navy, that served in World War II
- INS Mumbai (D62) is a Delhi-class guided-missile destroyer, commissioned in 2001

== See also ==
- HMIS Bombay
