= MV Corals =

Cruise ship

MV Corals is a cruise ship that operates between the city of Cochin and the Lakshadweep islands. The ship was built by Colombo Dockyard in Sri Lanka with Norway-based Global Maritime Brevik. The then Union Minister of Shipping, Road Transport and Highways, Nitin Jairam Gadkari, dedicated the ship on January 10, 2015, to the nation.

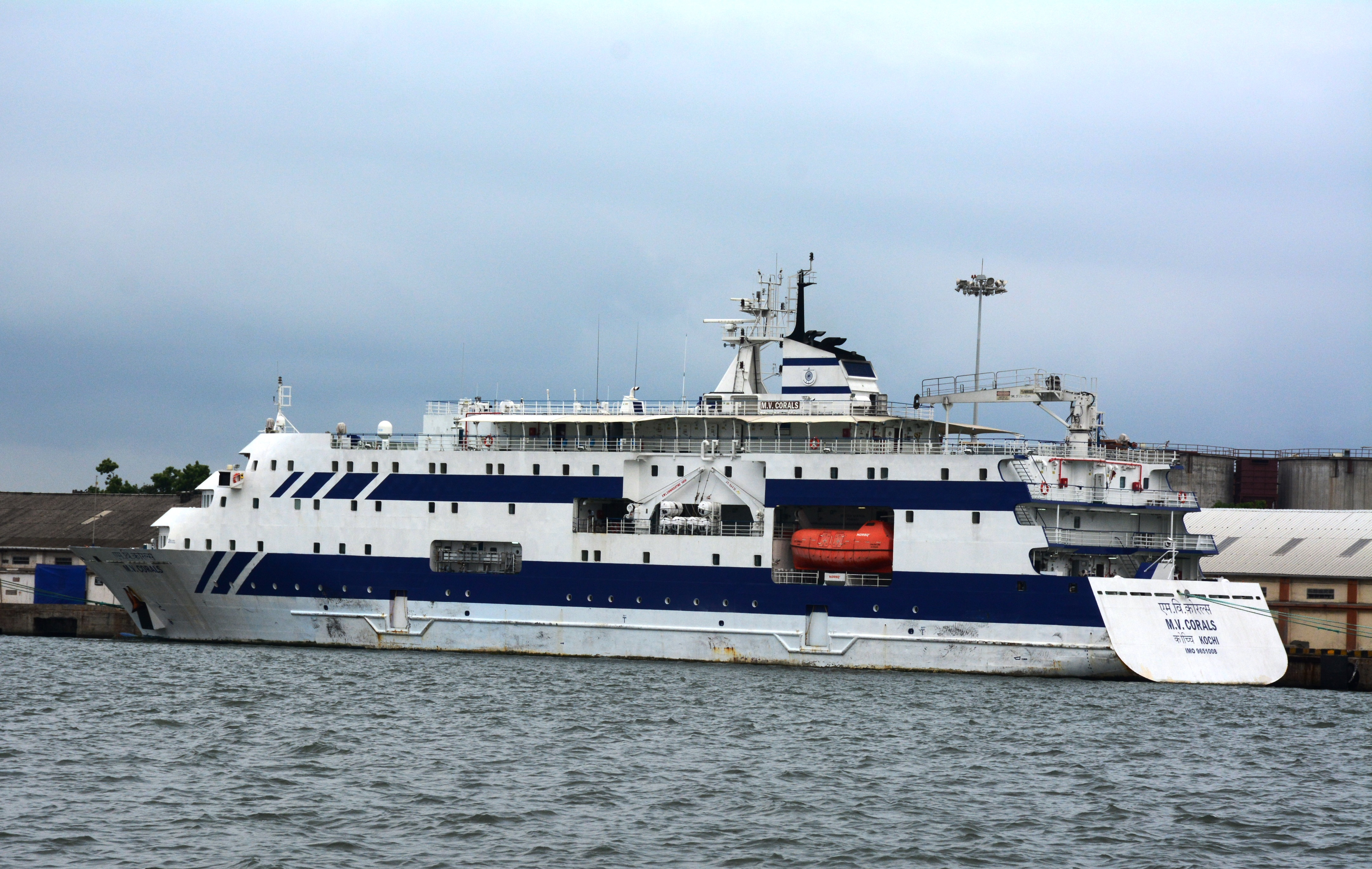
MV Corals at Cochin Port in 2017

== Details ==
Corals has a capacity to carry 400 passengers and 250 tonnes of cargo. The vessel has 10 first class cabin berths, 40 second-class berths and 350 bunks. All the passenger compartments are centrally air-conditioned. The overall length of the vessel is 99.00 m; breadth mld – 17.00 m; depth – 9.20 m; and design Draft – 4.20 m. The ship has a top speed of 16 knots and covers the distance between Cochin port and Lakshadweep overnight.

=== Operation Raahat ===
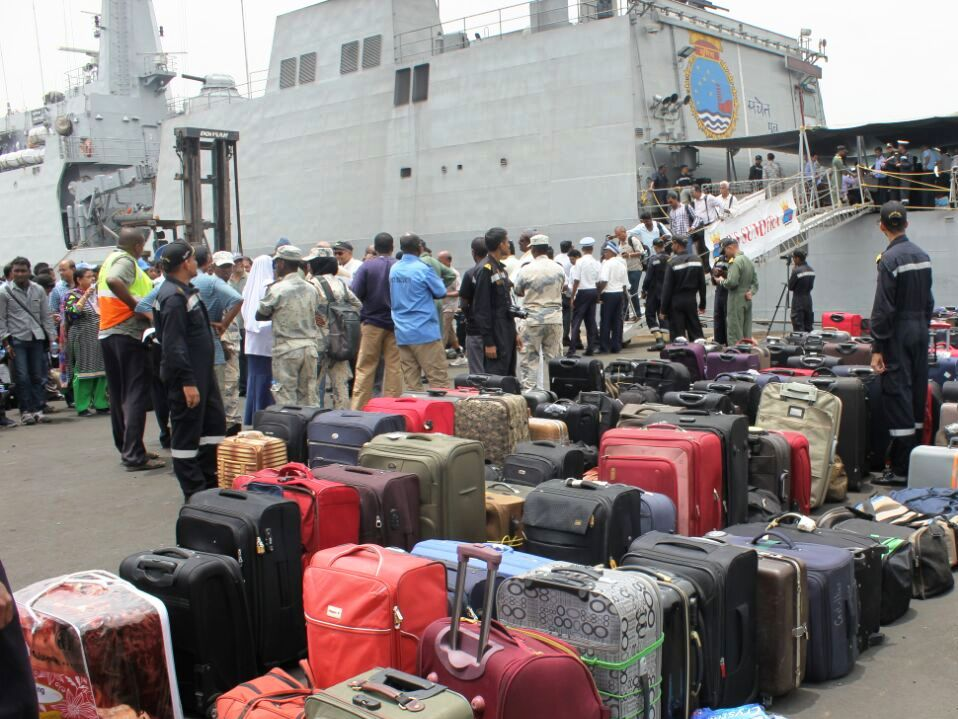
Indian evacuees lining up for embarkation on INS Sumitra.

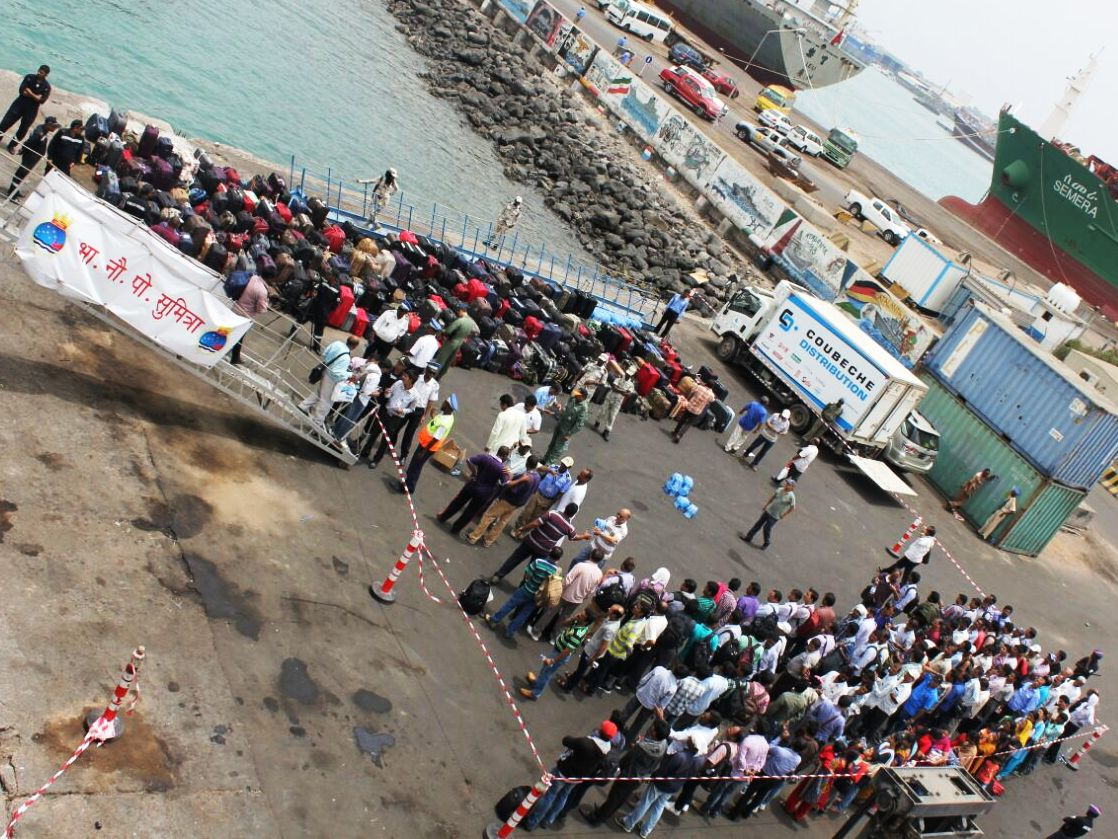
Indian evacuees along with their belongings at jetty before embarking on INS Sumitra.

As Yemen was not accessible by air due to a no-fly zone, India chose Djibouti as a centre for initial evacuation by sea. Indians in Yemen were advised to reach Sana'a and Aden. The Indian Navy redeployed the patrol vessel INS Sumitra (P59) from anti-piracy operations off the coast of Lakshadweep to the Yemeni port of Aden. In addition, it dispatched the destroyer INS Mumbai (D62) (Captain Rajesh Dhankhar) and frigate INS Tarkash (F50) (Captain Pradeep Singh) from Mumbai to provide protection and support to Indian ships and aircraft in the conflict zone. Both sailed 1,350 nautical miles (2,500 km; 1,550 mi) in four days to reach Yemen. The Indian Air Force deployed two C-17 Globemaster cargo aircraft with a capacity of 600 passengers to Djibouti.

Two ferries belonging to the Lakshadweep administration, MV Kavaratti and MV Corals, with a capacity of 1,500 passengers were dispatched to Aden. In addition, two Air India Airbus A320 aircraft were also deployed to Muscat in neighboring Oman.

On 1 April 2015, INS Sumitra reached Aden to evacuate 349 Indians. When Air India was permitted to fly to Yemen on 3 April 2015, it began evacuating people from Sana'a to Djibouti and Djibouti to Mumbai or Kochi. Two C-17 Globemasters flew nine sorties to Mumbai and two to Kochi from Djibouti. On 4 April 2015, INS Mumbai reached Aden but was unable to dock due to shelling, so the people were ferried to the ship in small boats.

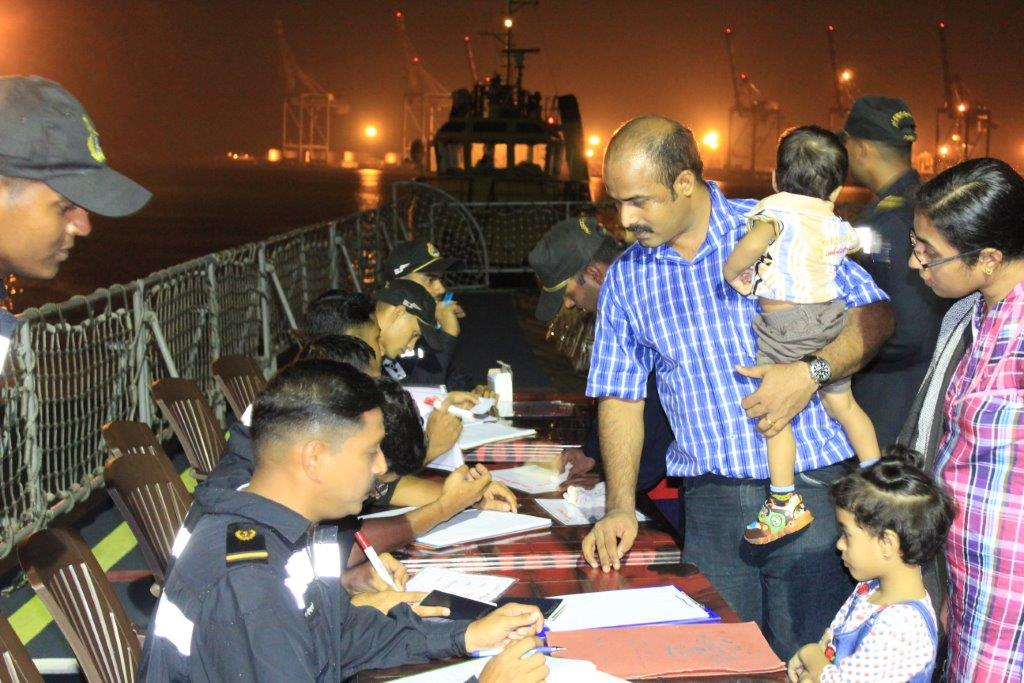
Indian Navy personnel registering Indian citizens evacuating from Yemen.

Over the days more than 4,640 overseas Indians were evacuated along with 960 foreign nationals from more than 41 countries. Some of them did not have the operational capability to carry out a rescue operation, so they sought India's help. These countries included: Bahrain, Bangladesh, Canada, Cuba, Czech Republic, Djibouti, Egypt, France, Hungary, Indonesia, Ireland, Italy, Jordan, Kenya, Lebanon, Maldives, Morocco, Myanmar, Nepal, Pakistan, the Philippines, Romania, Russia, Singapore, Sri Lanka, Slovenia, Sweden, Syria, Turkey, Thailand, Uganda, the United Kingdom, and the United States. Of a total of 5,600 people, 2,900 Indians were evacuated by 18 special flights from Sana'a and 1,670 Indians by Indian Navy ships from four ports. 11 Indians were evacuated by the Pakistan Navy frigate PNS Aslat from Mukalla, reached Karachi, and were flown back to India on 8 April 2015. The air evacuation ended on 9 April 2015 while the sea evacuation ended on 11 April 2015. 200 Indians refused to leave Yemen for various reasons.

The following table gives details of evacuations carried out by the Indian Navy, but does not include air evacuations:

Date of evacuation	Port of evacuation	Ship	Arrival at Djibouti	Evacuees		
Date of evacuation	Port of evacuation	Ship	Arrival at Djibouti	Indians	Foreigners	Total
31 March	Aden	Sumitra	1 April	349	0	349
2 April	Al Hudaydah	Sumitra	3 April	306	11	317
4 April	Aden	Mumbai	4 April	265	176	441
5 April	Ash Shihr	Sumitra	5 April	182	21	203
6 April	Al Hudaydah	Mumbai	6 April	463	11	474
7 April	Al Hudaydah	Tarkash	8 April	54	20	74
9 April	Al Hudaydah	Sumitra	10 April	46	303	349
10 April	Aden	Tarkash	11 April	42	422	464
15 April	Al Hudaydah	Sumitra	16 April	76	327	403
Total				1783	1291	3074

INS Mumbai and INS Tarkash returned to Mumbai harbour on 16 and 18 April 2015, respectively, after completing Operation Raahat.

MV Kavaratti and MV Corals arrived in Kochi on 18 April. The ships had helped evacuate 475 passengers including 73 Indians, 337 Bangladeshis, and 65 Yemeni citizens of Indian origin.

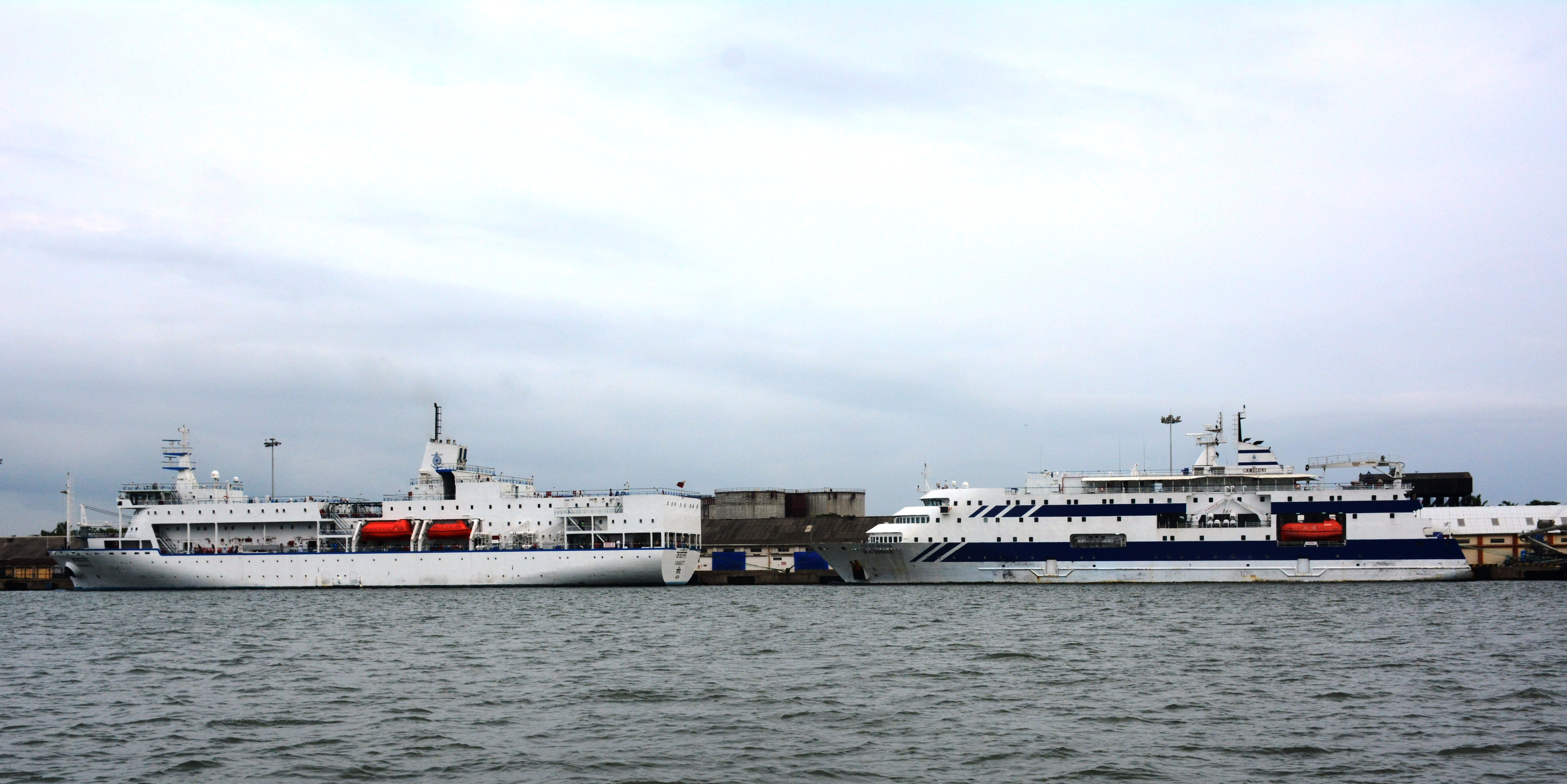
MV Kavaratti with MV Corals docked at Cochin Port
