= MV Kavaratti =

The MV Kavaratti is a cruise ship that operates between the city of Kochi and the Lakshadweep islands. The ship was built in Hindustan shipyard Limited, Visakhapatnam and is painted white.

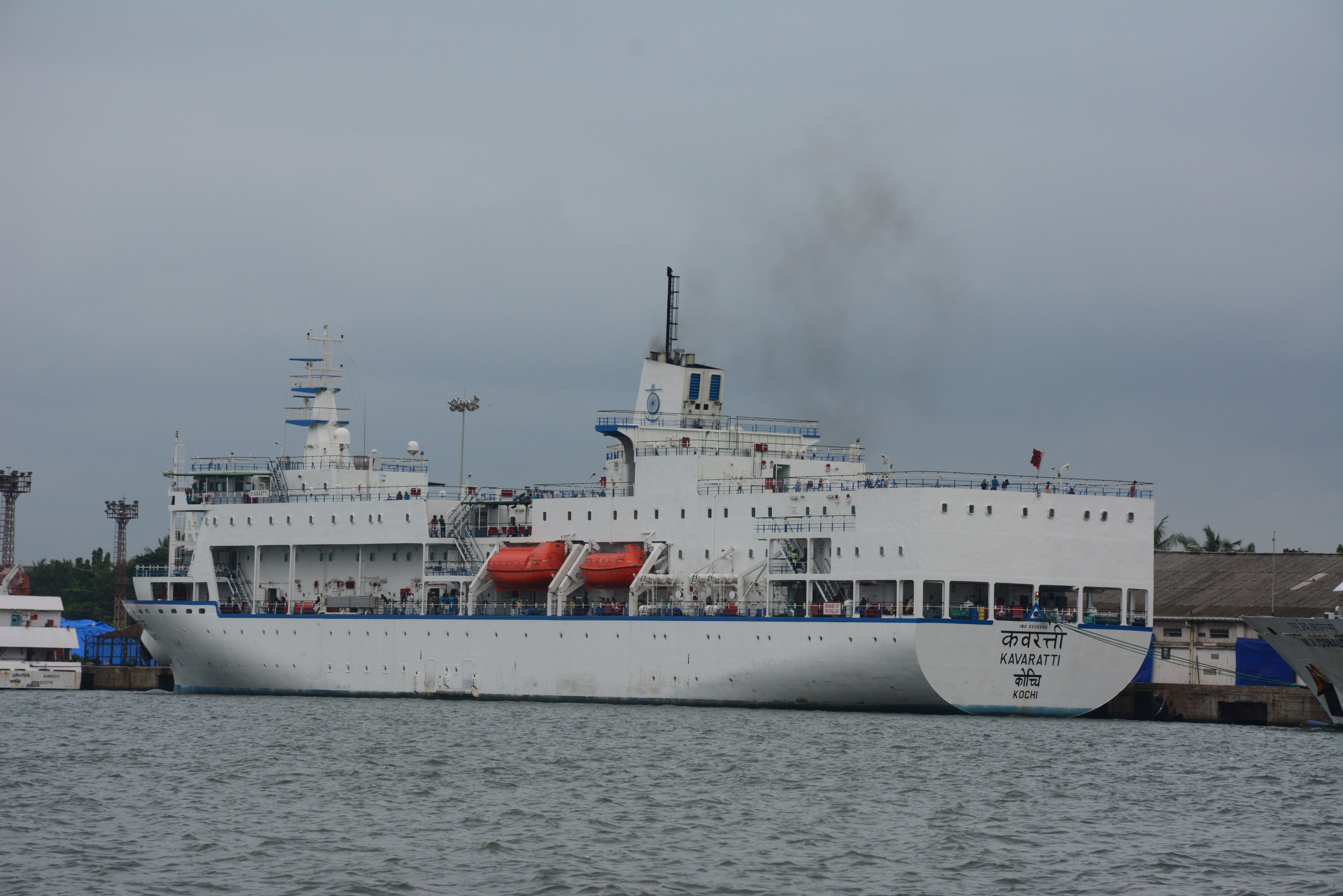
MV Kavaratti is a Cruise Ship which provides service between Kochi and Lakshadweep

MV Kavaratti, was designed especially for the Lakshadweep Islands to promote tourism. The 120 meter long ship with a total carrying capacity of 700 passengers and 200 tons of cargo is the largest passenger vessel ever created in India that is built with a total estimated cost of Rs. 173 crore INR.

The Ship has six decks, the topmost being an open deck with the bridge and a helipad. The 3rd, 4th and the 5th deck have two bed cabins whereas the 1st and the 2nd deck have bunk beds and lower class cabins. There is a swimming pool on the 5th deck. There is a recreation hall at the front side and a cafeteria at the rear side on the 4th deck. A hospital and an information desk are on the 3rd deck. Main embarkation door is at 3rd deck and secondary embarkation doors are at the 1st deck.

== Operation Raahat ==
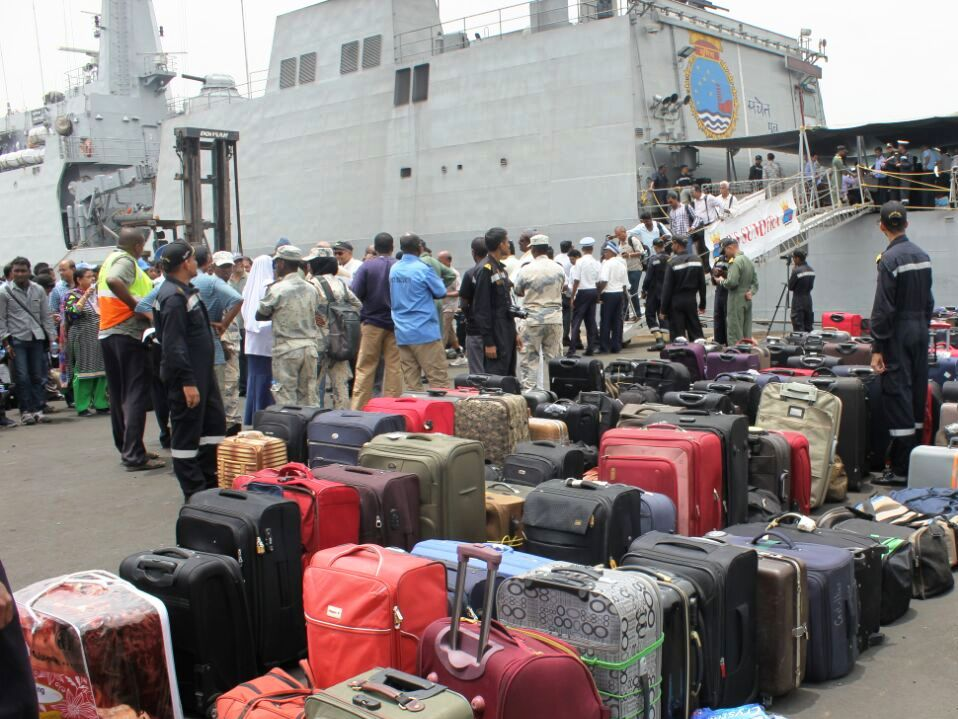
Indian evacuees lining up for embarkation on INS Sumitra.

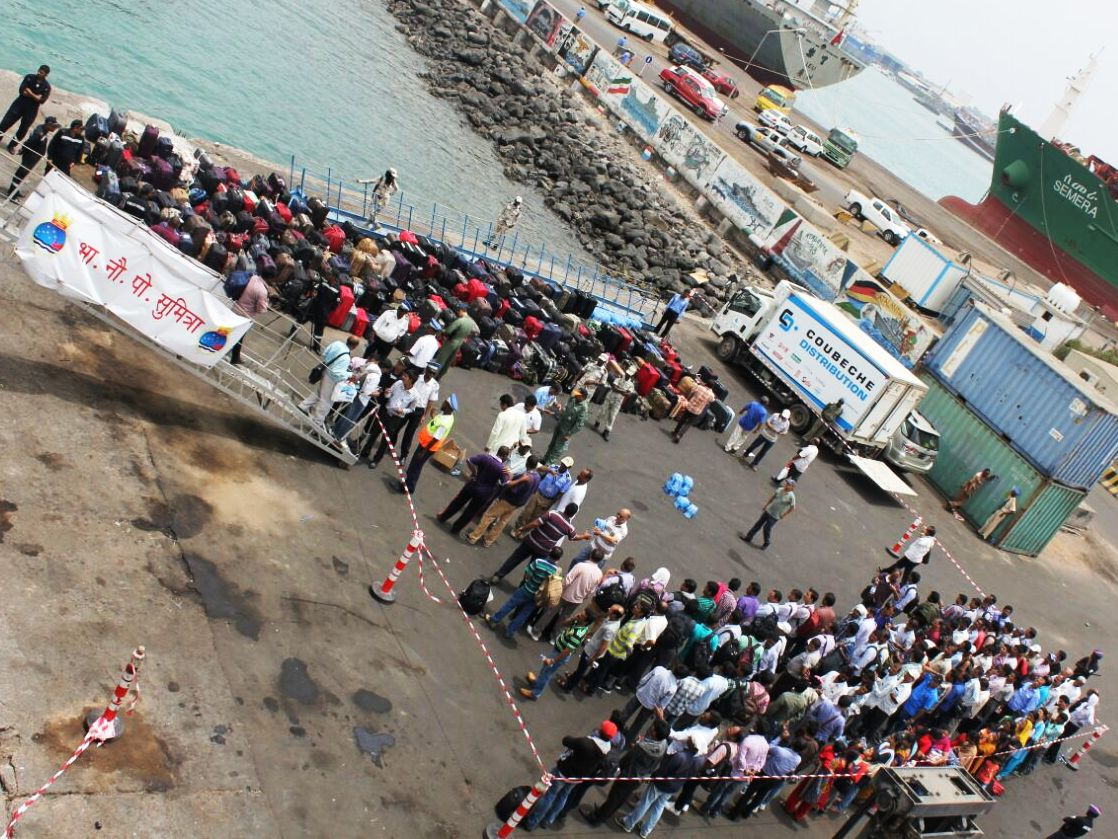
Indian evacuees along with their belongings at jetty before embarking on INS Sumitra.

As Yemen was not accessible by air due to a no-fly zone, India chose Djibouti as a centre for initial evacuation by sea. Indians in Yemen were advised to reach Sana'a and Aden. The Indian Navy redeployed the patrol vessel INS Sumitra (P59) from anti-piracy operations off the coast of Lakshadweep to the Yemeni port of Aden. In addition, it dispatched the destroyer INS Mumbai (D62) (Captain Rajesh Dhankhar) and frigate INS Tarkash (F50) (Captain Pradeep Singh) from Mumbai to provide protection and support to Indian ships and aircraft in the conflict zone. Both sailed 1,350 nautical miles (2,500 km; 1,550 mi) in four days to reach Yemen. The Indian Air Force deployed two C-17 Globemaster cargo aircraft with a capacity of 600 passengers to Djibouti.

Two ferries belonging to the Lakshadweep administration, MV Kavaratti and MV Corals, with a capacity of 1,500 passengers were dispatched to Aden. In addition, two Air India Airbus A320 aircraft were also deployed to Muscat in neighboring Oman.

On 1 April 2015, INS Sumitra reached Aden to evacuate 349 Indians. When Air India was permitted to fly to Yemen on 3 April 2015, it began evacuating people from Sana'a to Djibouti and Djibouti to Mumbai or Kochi. Two C-17 Globemasters flew nine sorties to Mumbai and two to Kochi from Djibouti. On 4 April 2015, INS Mumbai reached Aden but was unable to dock due to shelling, so the people were ferried to the ship in small boats.

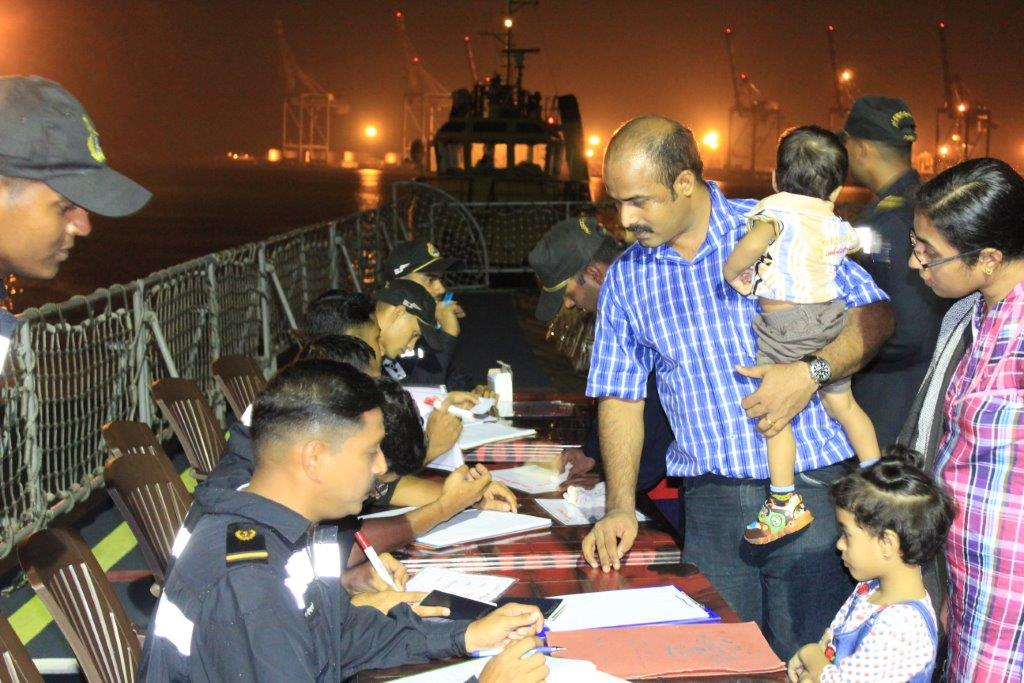
Indian Navy personnel registering Indian citizens evacuating from Yemen.

Over the days more than 4,640 overseas Indians were evacuated along with 960 foreign nationals from more than 41 countries. Some of them did not have the operational capability to carry out a rescue operation, so they sought India's help. These countries included: Bahrain, Bangladesh, Canada, Cuba, Czech Republic, Djibouti, Egypt, France, Hungary, Indonesia, Ireland, Italy, Jordan, Kenya, Lebanon, Maldives, Morocco, Myanmar, Nepal, Pakistan, the Philippines, Romania, Russia, Singapore, Sri Lanka, Slovenia, Sweden, Syria, Turkey, Thailand, Uganda, the United Kingdom, and the United States. Of a total of 5,600 people, 2,900 Indians were evacuated by 18 special flights from Sana'a and 1,670 Indians by Indian Navy ships from four ports. 11 Indians were evacuated by the Pakistan Navy frigate PNS Aslat from Mukalla, reached Karachi, and were flown back to India on 8 April 2015. The air evacuation ended on 9 April 2015 while the sea evacuation ended on 11 April 2015. 200 Indians refused to leave Yemen for various reasons.

The following table gives details of evacuations carried out by the Indian Navy, but does not include air evacuations:

Date of evacuation	Port of evacuation	Ship	Arrival at Djibouti	Evacuees		
Date of evacuation	Port of evacuation	Ship	Arrival at Djibouti	Indians	Foreigners	Total
31 March	Aden	Sumitra	1 April	349	0	349
2 April	Al Hudaydah	Sumitra	3 April	306	11	317
4 April	Aden	Mumbai	4 April	265	176	441
5 April	Ash Shihr	Sumitra	5 April	182	21	203
6 April	Al Hudaydah	Mumbai	6 April	463	11	474
7 April	Al Hudaydah	Tarkash	8 April	54	20	74
9 April	Al Hudaydah	Sumitra	10 April	46	303	349
10 April	Aden	Tarkash	11 April	42	422	464
15 April	Al Hudaydah	Sumitra	16 April	76	327	403
Total				1783	1291	3074

INS Mumbai and INS Tarkash returned to Mumbai harbour on 16 and 18 April 2015, respectively, after completing Operation Raahat.

MV Kavaratti and MV Corals arrived in Kochi on 18 April. The ships had helped evacuate 475 passengers including 73 Indians, 337 Bangladeshis, and 65 Yemeni citizens of Indian origin.
