= Bangladesh–Somalia relations =

- Bangladesh: Somalia

Bangladesh–Somalia relations refer to the current and historical relationship between Bangladesh and Somalia.

== Political relations ==
=== 2021 ===
- Bangladesh and Somalia agree to begin working together in Education, IT, and Agriculture.

=== 2023 ===
- Bangladesh gives financial aid to Somalia, aiming to improve its international image and support a fellow Muslim-majority country.
- Bangladesh completes a two-year term as Chair of the Indian Ocean Rim Association.

=== 2024 ===
- Ahmed Moallim Fiqi is appointed as the new "Minister of the Ministry of Foreign Affairs and International Cooperation of the Federal Republic of Somalia" by Somali Prime Minister Hamza Abdi Barre, furthering Bangladeshi-Somali relations.

=== 2025 ===
- Red Sea instability due to the Yemen Houthi movement’s actions diverts counter efforts against Somali pirates.

== Military relations ==
- 2009 - Bangladesh announces a military modernization program, strengthening its naval capabilities.
- 2024 - Bangladesh successfully negotiates the release of the MV Abdullah and its 23 crew members from Somali pirates.

== Economic relations ==
=== 2015 ===
- Bangladesh sends exports to Somalia worth $9,520,000.
- Somalia sends exports to Bangladesh worth $124,000.

=== 2024 ===
- MV Abdullah is hijacked by Somali pirates, highlighting security concerns.The MV Abdullah, a Bangladeshi vessel, was transporting 55,000 tons of coal to the UAE from Mozambique.
- Bangladesh agrees to contribute Tk 8.21 crore (~SDR 0.70 million) to the IMF for Somalia's debt relief.
