= India–Yemen relations =

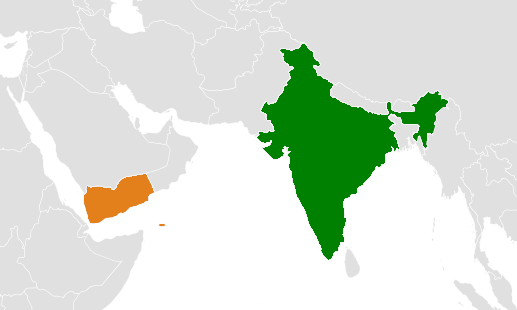
- India: Yemen

India–Yemen relations refer to the current and historical relationship of the Republic of India and Republic of Yemen. Diplomatic relations between these countries were established in November 1967 when India recognized Yemen's independence from the United Kingdom. Relations continue to be in good shape notwithstanding India's close partnership with Saudi Arabia or Yemen's close ties with Pakistan.

India has an embassy in Sana'a, while Yemen has an embassy in New Delhi. As of 2015, Embassy of India, Sana’a temporarily operates out of Camp office Djibouti due to the political and security situation in Yemen.

== History ==
In 1839, Aden became part of the British Raj and was administered by the Bombay Presidency. A garrison of 2000 Indian soldiers was established in the province and the Indian Rupee was made the official currency of Aden. In 1855, a fortnightly steamer service with Bombay was initiated by Peninsular and Orient Line. An engineer of India, Sir Mokshagundam Visvesvaraya was sent by the United Kingdom to Aden in 1906 to lay out an effective underground drainage system and to prepare a scheme for providing drinking water.

=== Yemenite Civil War ===
During the outbreak of the Civil War, India took a neutral stand. Indian doctors and nurses were perhaps the only expatriates who stayed behind and rendered humanitarian services to the people of Yemen. In July 1994, following the successful conclusion of the Civil War, the Government of Yemen sought the help of the Government of India in admitting over 150 war-wounded persons for medical treatment in the hospitals in Bombay, which was readily agreed to by the Indian side.

Following the 2015 military intervention in Yemen led by Saudi Arabia to quell the Houthi Rebellion, India undertook Operation Raahat. In the operation, Indian Armed Forces evacuated more than 4640 Indian citizens along with 960 foreign nationals of 41 countries.

== See also ==
- Chaush
- Foreign relations of India
- Foreign relations of Yemen
- Indians in Yemen
