= Bombay (1801 ship) =

History

United Kingdom
- Name: Bombay
- Namesake: Bombay
- Builder: Bomanjee, Demaun (Daman)
- Launched: 1801
- Fate: Last listed 1853

General characteristics
- Tons burthen: Old Act:310, or 314, or 31577/94 (bm); New Act (post 1836):400 (bm)
- Length: 98 ft 4 in (30.0 m)
- Beam: 26 ft 11 in (8.2 m)
- Propulsion: Sail
- Sail plan: Brig

Bombay was launched in 1801 at Daman/Demaun. Her early career is obscure. From 1821 on she assumed Calcutta registry. Between 1832 and 1840 she made three voyages from London as a whaler. In 1842 she carried settlers for the New Zealand Company. She was last listed in 1853.

== Career ==
At some point Bombay entered the Calcutta registry.

Year	Master	Owner	Source & notes
1821	J.Hill	W. Richardson & Co.	East India register and directory for 1821
1824		Humphreys	East India register and directory for 1824
1827	S.Parker	Lackersteens & Co.	East India register and directory for 1827
1828	S. Parker	Lackersteen & Co.	East India register and directory for 1828
1829	J.Dare	Palmer & Co.	East India register and directory for 1829

From 1827 to 1830 Bombay was sailing in Australian and Indonesian waters firstly under Captain Samuel Parker and then under Captain Joseph Dare.

Bombay first appeared in Lloyd's Register in 1831 with J.Dare, master, Prinsep & Co., owner, and trade Cowes–London. It gave her burthen as 318 tons, and her origin as Calcutta.

Year	Master	Owner	Trade	Source
1832	J.Dare; Lawson	J.Dare	London–Swan River	LR
1832	J.Dare; Lawson	J.Dare; Lawson	London–Swan River; London–Southern Fishery	Register of Shipping (RS)

In May 1830 Bombay was at Swan River. She was coming from Calcutta with general cargo, 25 passengers, and ten convicts, and was sailing on to Sydney. While she was at Swan River gales wrecked many vessels, including James and the Bombay-registered ketch Emelia and Ellen. Bombay remained safe in the harbour and sailed on 23 June. But erroneous reports in Lloyd's List and elsewhere resulted in reports that she had been lost. (Note: The Shipwreck Databases of the Western Australian Museum identifies the wreck of Emelia and Ellen, which it describes as being of 200 tons (bm), as being that of Bombay.) She arrived at Sydney on 26 July with passengers, Mr. Goldsmith, late master of James, and the ten prisoners.

=== Whaler ===
Between 1832 and 1840 Bombay became a whaler.

==== 1st whaling voyage (1832–1834) ====
Captain Edward Lawson sailed from London on 10 July 1832, bound for the Indian Ocean. Bombay returned to London on 3 April 1834.

==== 2nd whaling voyage (1834–1835) ====
Captain Edward Lawson sailed from London on 24 April 1834. Bombay returned at some point in 1835 with 500 or more barrels of whale oil.

==== 3rd whaling voyage (1836–1840) ====
Captain Edward Lawson sailed from London on 22 January 1836, bound for New Zealand and the Pacific. On 17 September 1837 she was in Sydney under Captain Lawson carrying sperm whale oil from the South Seas. She was also refitted at Sydney. She then sailed under Captain Evans for the South Seas on 9 February 1838. Lawson stayed ashore in Sydney until Bombay returned. He re-assumed command and returned to whaling in April 1839. Bombay arrived back at London on 7 September 1840.

=== Merchantman ===
In 1841 she sailed from Australia to Bombay under Captain Kitching.

After the New Zealand Company chartered Bombay she sailed under Captain James Moore from Deptford on 30 July 1842 and Gravesend on 1 August for Wellington and Nelson. She arrived at Nelson on 14 December 1842 with 134 settlers.

On 4 May 1846 Moore sailed Bombay sailed from Greenock for Sydney, arriving on 12 October. She then sailed to Port Phillip on 10 November and returned to Gravesend, arriving on 21 September 1847.

In 1851 Captain Dixon, in Bombay visited the islands of Lobos Afuara (6°59′S 80°42′W) and Lobos de Tierra (6°34′S 80°45′W), off the coast of Peru. He confirmed an observation by Lawson some years earlier that there were commercially viable guano deposits there.

=== Lloyd's Register ===
Year	Master	Owner	Trade	Source & notes
1840	E. Lawson	Lawson	London–South Seas	LR; small damages repaired 1835
1845	J.Moore	E. Lawson	"Sws"–Africa; Clyde–Port Phillip	LR; damages repaired 1842 & 1843
1850	J.Moore	E. Lawson	London–India	LR; damages repaired 1849
1853	J.C. Dixon	E. Lawson		LR
