= MV Abdullah =

Bulk carrier

History
- Name: Golden Hawk
- Owner: Abdirahman Bille Gurigube
- Port of registry: Panama
- Completed: 2015

History
- Name: Abdullah
- Owner: Kabir Group
- Port of registry: Bangladesh
- Acquired: 2023
- Identification: IMO number: 9745598; MMSI number: 405000414
- Notes: Hijacked in March 2024 by pirates

General characteristics
- Class & type: Bulk carrier
- Tonnage: 32714
- Length: 189 m (620 ft 1 in)
- Beam: 32 m (105 ft 0 in)
- Crew: 23

MV Abdullah, originally named MV Golden Hawk, is a Bangladeshi bulk carrier.

== History ==
Built in 2015, the 623-foot (190 m) vessel was acquired in late 2023 from Japanese owners. The MV Abdullah is currently owned by KSRM Shipping Ltd.

=== Hijacking ===
On 12 March 2024, the ship was hijacked by pirates while underway, travelling from the capital of Mozambique, Maputo, to Hamriya Port in the United Arab Emirates. The vessel was carrying 55,000 tonnes according to Kabir Steel Re-Rolling Mills, the ship's owner.

All 23 members of the ship's crew were held hostage. The ship had been 72 nautical miles (133 km; 83 mi) off the coast of Somalia. On 14 March, a ship was deployed by the European Union as part of Operation Atalanta to shadow the cargo carrier.

Some Indian media reports claimed that on 14 March, Indian Navy's INS Tarkash intercepted the hijacked ship to rescue the crew members onboard and dispatched a P-8I maritime patrol aircraft to the location. Somali pirates released the hijacked ship MV Abdullah, a Bangladesh-flagged bulk carrier, and its crew of 23 early on Sunday, April 14, 2024 after a $5 million (€4.7 million) ransom was paid, which did not involve the deployed Indian Navy. Bangladesh Foreign Minister Hasan Mahmud dismissed such media reports of the Indian Navy as "not true at all", and mentioned the government of Bangladesh's ongoing efforts to negotiate with the pirates. Another Bangladeshi official said that the ship was anchored close to the Somali coast, and "was commandeered away from its previous position to another hijacked ship which needs fuel."

On 14 April, the ship along with her crew were released when the pirates claimed that they were paid a ransom of US$5,000,000. The claim was not then independently confirmed, though the vessel's owner did confirm that the ship and her crew were released following negotiations. MV Abdullah was then escorted by two warships to the United Arab Emirates. The ransom payment was arranged by a UK-based marine insurance P&I club. According to the Bangladesh Merchant Marine Officers Association, three waterproof bags containing $5 million in cash were dropped from a chartered plane near where the ship was anchored in the Somali sea.

== See also ==
- Piracy off the coast of Somalia
