= INS Sumitra =

Indian Navy patrol vessel

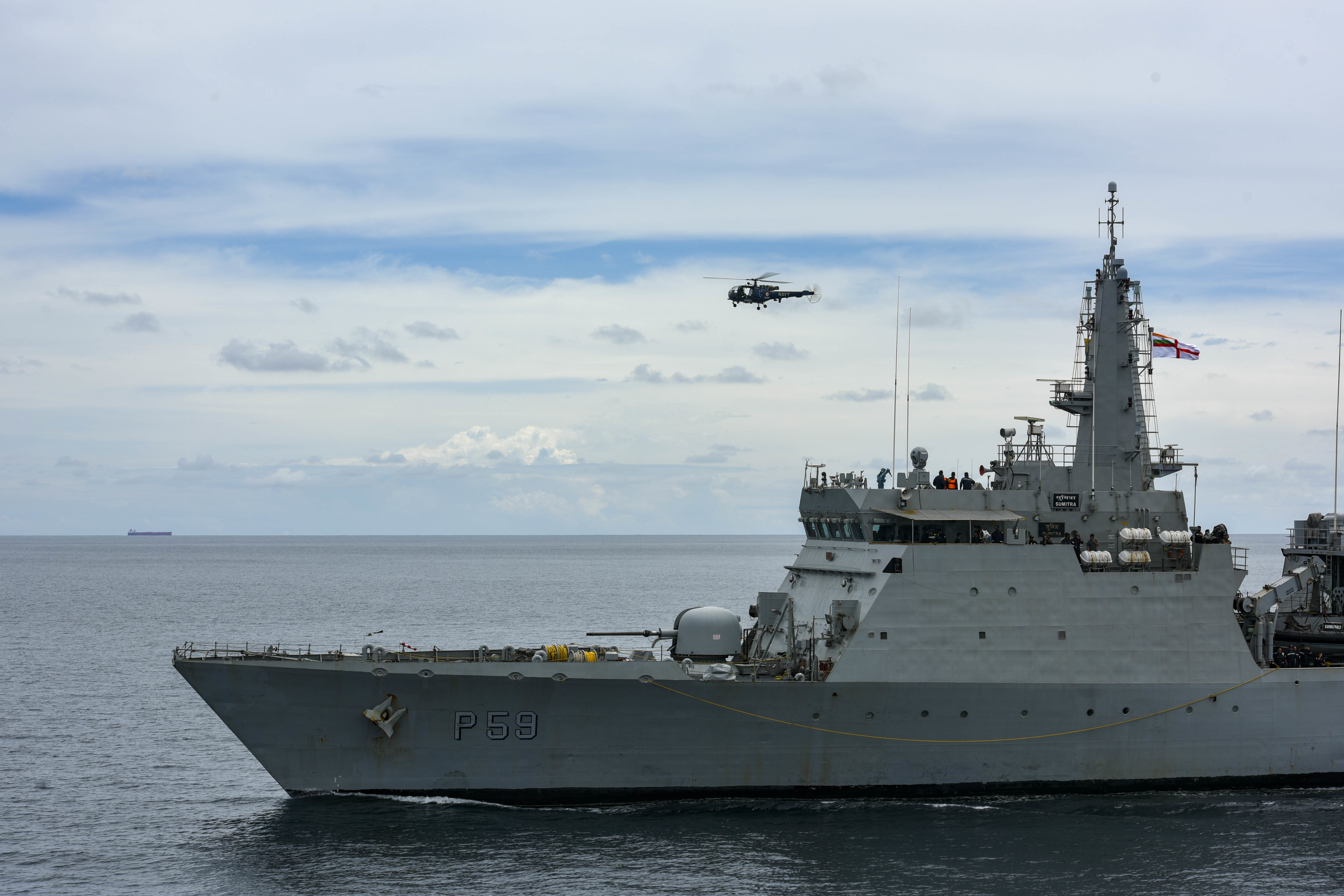
- INS Sumitra during an exercise.

History

India
- Name: INS Sumitra
- Namesake: Sumitra
- Operator: Indian Navy
- Builder: Goa Shipyard Limited
- Laid down: 28 April 2010
- Launched: 6 December 2010
- Commissioned: 4 September 2014
- Identification: MMSI number: 419098800; Callsign: AVEM
- Status: Active
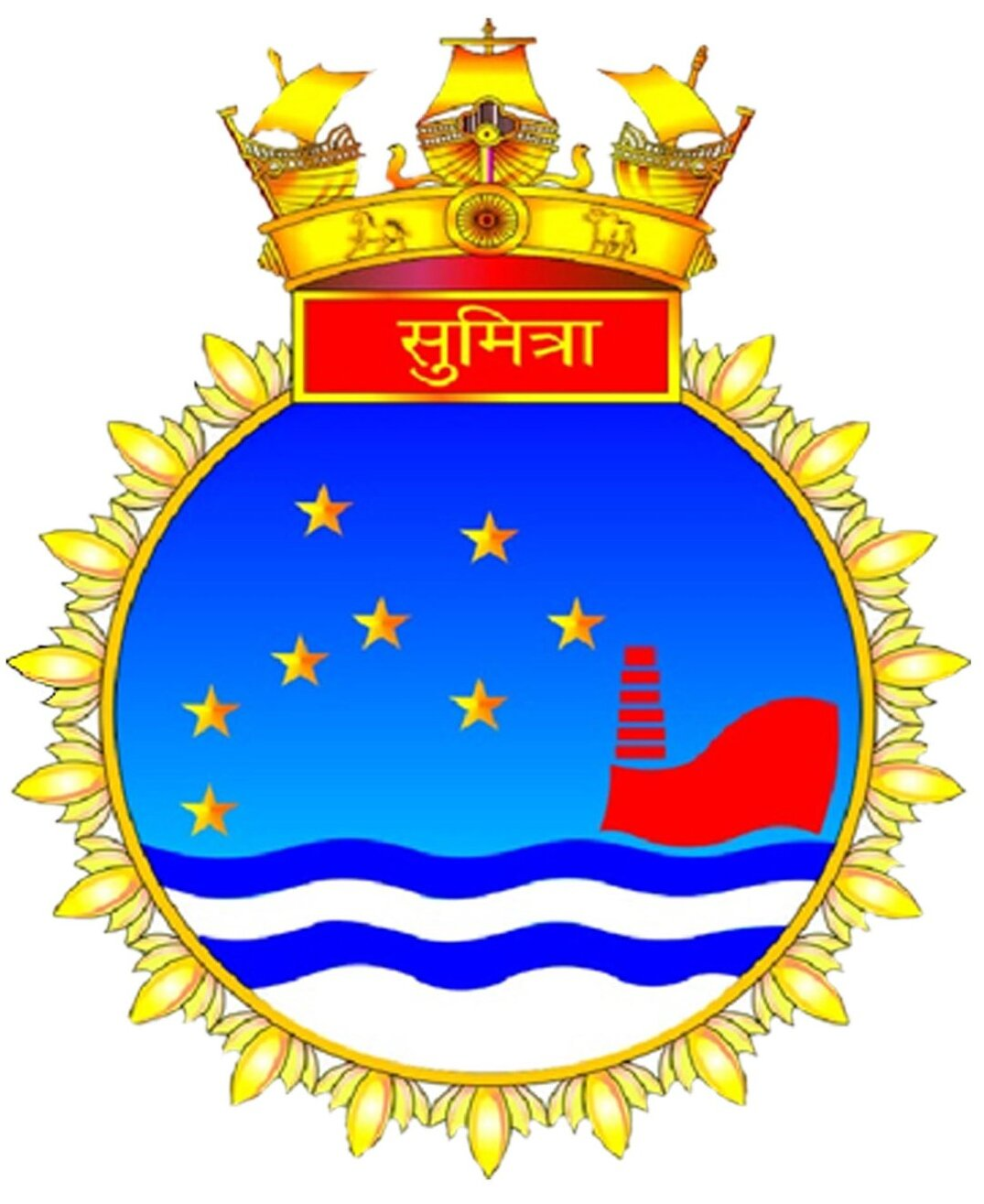
- Badge

General characteristics
- Class & type: Saryu-class patrol vessel
- Tonnage: 2,200 tonnes (2,200 long tons; 2,400 short tons)
- Length: 105 m (344 ft)
- Beam: 13 m (43 ft)
- Propulsion: Two KOEL/Pielstick Diesel engines
- Speed: 25 knots (46 km/h; 29 mph)
- Range: 6,000 nautical miles (11,000 km; 6,900 mi) at 16 knots (30 km/h; 18 mph)
- Complement: Eight officers and 108 sailors
- Armament: 76-mm SRGM (Super Rapid Gun Mount); close-in weapon system; CHAFF launchers
- Aircraft carried: 1 × HAL Dhruv or 1 × HAL Chetak

INS Sumitra is the fourth and last Saryu-class patrol vessel of the Indian Navy, designed and constructed by Goa Shipyard Limited. It is also the presidential yacht of India. It is designed to undertake fleet support operations, coastal and offshore patrolling, ocean surveillance and monitoring of sea lines of communications and offshore assets and escort duties.

== Construction ==
The keel of INS Sumitra was laid at Goa Shipyard Ltd (GSL) on 28 April 2010, and she was launched on 6 December 2010. During her construction at GSL, she was known as Yard 1211.

== Service history ==
INS Sumitra completed her sea trials and was handed over to the Indian Navy on 18 July 2014, and was commissioned into the fleet by the Chief of Naval Staff Admiral RK Dhowan on 4 September 2014 in Chennai. She will operate under the Eastern Naval Command and conduct maritime surveillance and coastal security missions. Her first Commanding Officer is Commander Milind Mokashi.

=== Operation Raahat ===
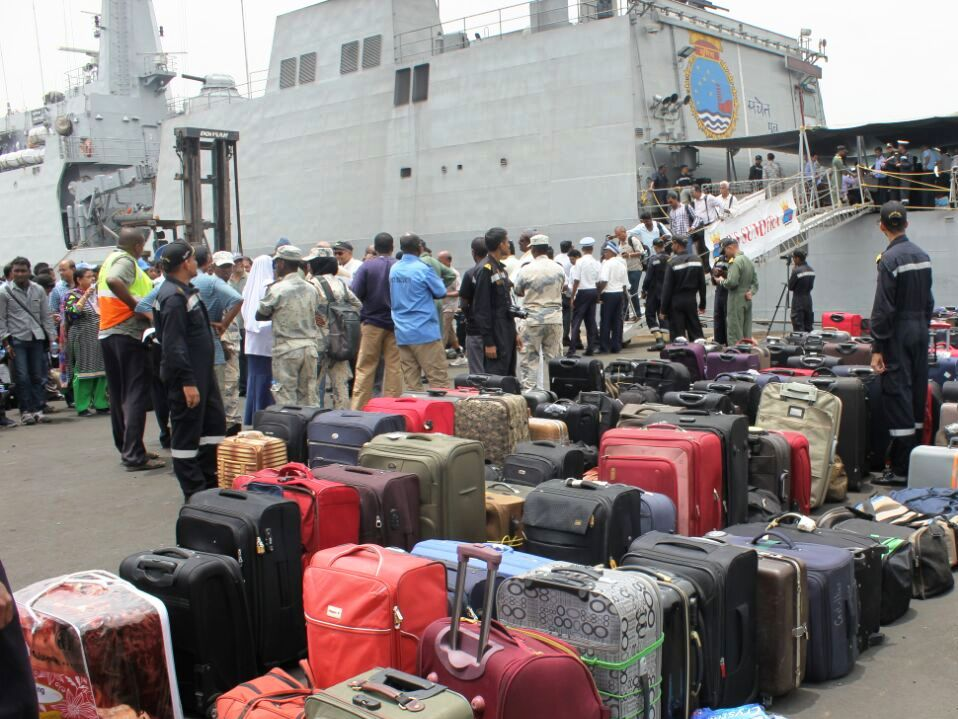
Indian evacuees lining up for embarkation on INS Sumitra.

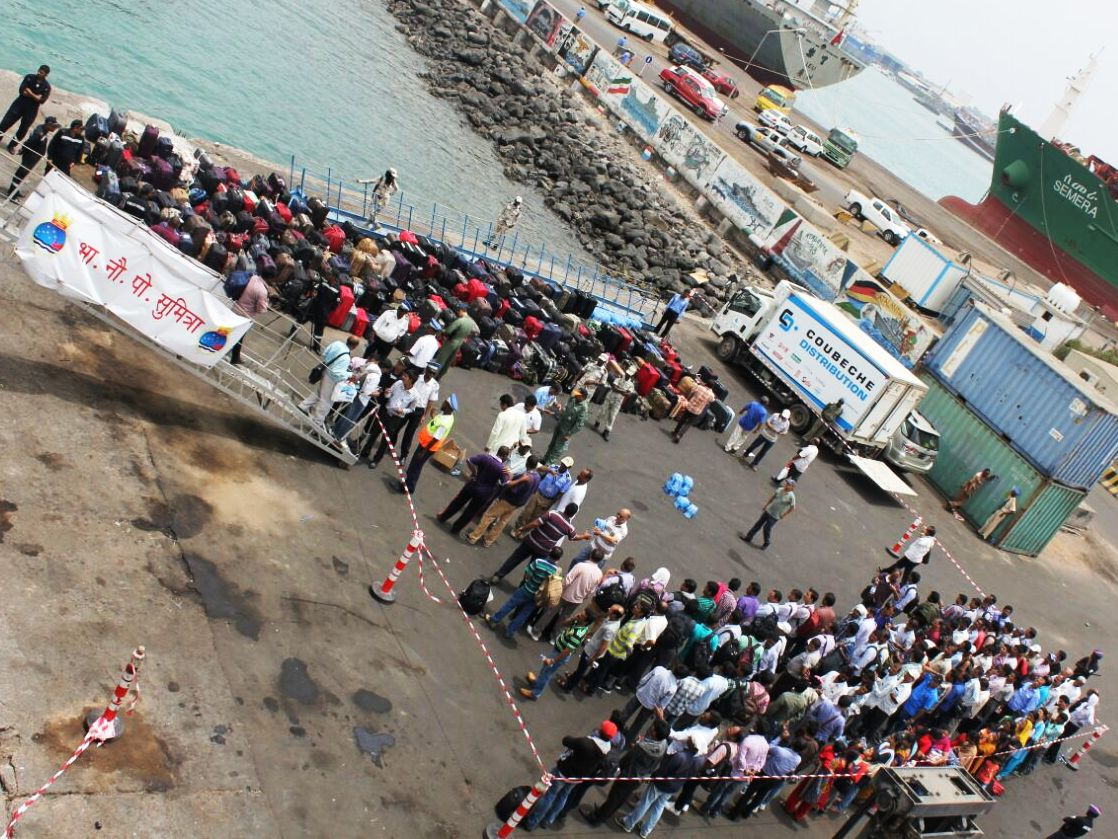
Indian evacuees along with their belongings at jetty before embarking on INS Sumitra.

As Yemen was not accessible by air due to a no-fly zone, India chose Djibouti as a centre for initial evacuation by sea. Indians in Yemen were advised to reach Sana'a and Aden. The Indian Navy redeployed the patrol vessel INS Sumitra (P59) from anti-piracy operations off the coast of Lakshadweep to the Yemeni port of Aden. In addition, it dispatched the destroyer INS Mumbai (D62) (Captain Rajesh Dhankhar) and frigate INS Tarkash (F50) (Captain Pradeep Singh) from Mumbai to provide protection and support to Indian ships and aircraft in the conflict zone. Both sailed 1,350 nautical miles (2,500 km; 1,550 mi) in four days to reach Yemen. The Indian Air Force deployed two C-17 Globemaster cargo aircraft with a capacity of 600 passengers to Djibouti.

Two ferries belonging to the Lakshadweep administration, MV Kavaratti and MV Corals, with a capacity of 1,500 passengers were dispatched to Aden. In addition, two Air India Airbus A320 aircraft were also deployed to Muscat in neighboring Oman.

On 1 April 2015, INS Sumitra reached Aden to evacuate 349 Indians. When Air India was permitted to fly to Yemen on 3 April 2015, it began evacuating people from Sana'a to Djibouti and Djibouti to Mumbai or Kochi. Two C-17 Globemasters flew nine sorties to Mumbai and two to Kochi from Djibouti. On 4 April 2015, INS Mumbai reached Aden but was unable to dock due to shelling, so the people were ferried to the ship in small boats.

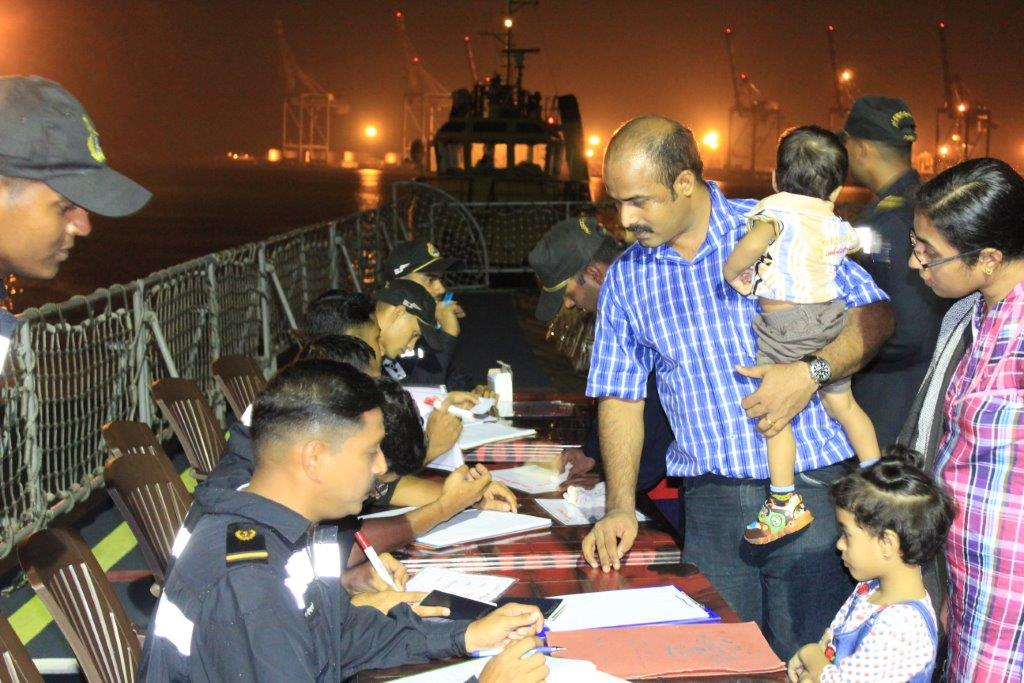
Indian Navy personnel registering Indian citizens evacuating from Yemen.

Over the days more than 4,640 overseas Indians were evacuated along with 960 foreign nationals from more than 41 countries. Some of them did not have the operational capability to carry out a rescue operation, so they sought India's help. These countries included: Bahrain, Bangladesh, Canada, Cuba, Czech Republic, Djibouti, Egypt, France, Hungary, Indonesia, Ireland, Italy, Jordan, Kenya, Lebanon, Maldives, Morocco, Myanmar, Nepal, Pakistan, the Philippines, Romania, Russia, Singapore, Sri Lanka, Slovenia, Sweden, Syria, Turkey, Thailand, Uganda, the United Kingdom, and the United States. Of a total of 5,600 people, 2,900 Indians were evacuated by 18 special flights from Sana'a and 1,670 Indians by Indian Navy ships from four ports. 11 Indians were evacuated by the Pakistan Navy frigate PNS Aslat from Mukalla, reached Karachi, and were flown back to India on 8 April 2015. The air evacuation ended on 9 April 2015 while the sea evacuation ended on 11 April 2015. 200 Indians refused to leave Yemen for various reasons.

The following table gives details of evacuations carried out by the Indian Navy, but does not include air evacuations:

Date of evacuation	Port of evacuation	Ship	Arrival at Djibouti	Evacuees		
Date of evacuation	Port of evacuation	Ship	Arrival at Djibouti	Indians	Foreigners	Total
31 March	Aden	Sumitra	1 April	349	0	349
2 April	Al Hudaydah	Sumitra	3 April	306	11	317
4 April	Aden	Mumbai	4 April	265	176	441
5 April	Ash Shihr	Sumitra	5 April	182	21	203
6 April	Al Hudaydah	Mumbai	6 April	463	11	474
7 April	Al Hudaydah	Tarkash	8 April	54	20	74
9 April	Al Hudaydah	Sumitra	10 April	46	303	349
10 April	Aden	Tarkash	11 April	42	422	464
15 April	Al Hudaydah	Sumitra	16 April	76	327	403
Total				1783	1291	3074

INS Mumbai and INS Tarkash returned to Mumbai harbour on 16 and 18 April 2015, respectively, after completing Operation Raahat.

MV Kavaratti and MV Corals arrived in Kochi on 18 April. The ships had helped evacuate 475 passengers including 73 Indians, 337 Bangladeshis, and 65 Yemeni citizens of Indian origin.

=== Naseem Al Bahr maritime exercise 2022 ===
INS Sumitra took part in the 13th edition of Indo-Oman maritime exercise ‘Naseem Al Bahr’ (Sea Breeze) along with the Indian Navy's INS Trikand and Dornier 228 MPA and RNOS Al-Seeb and Al-Shinas from 19–24 November 2022. BAE Systems Hawk of the Royal Air Force of Oman also participated in the exercise.

=== Operation Sankalp: 2023-24 Anti-piracy patrols ===
On 29 January 2024, INS Sumitra successfully rescued fishermen hijacked by pirates along the East coast of Somalia and the Gulf of Aden. The naval warship was responding to a distress message regarding hijacking of an Iranian-flagged Fishing Vessel (FV) Iman. The fishing boat had been boarded by pirates and its 17-member crew was taken hostage. Acting in accordance with the established Standard Operation Procedures (SOPs) the crew successfully coerced the pirates for the safe release of the crew along with the boat & ensured the successful release of all 17 crew members along with the boat. The FV was subsequently sanitised and released for onward transit.

Less than 24 hours later, INS Sumitra rescued 19 Pakistani sailors after pirates hijacked their fishing vessel off the east coast of Somalia the previous day. Eleven armed pirates climbed onto another Iranian-flagged fishing vessel FV Al Naeemi and took 19 crew members, all Pakistanis, as hostage. The Navy warship intercepted the fishing vessel and coerced the pirates to release the hostages. The Navy warship intercepted the fishing vessel and forced the pirates to release the hostages with the help of MARCOS, a special forces unit of the Indian Navy, onboard. The warship intercepted the vessel on January 29 and surrounded it. The aggressive posturing by INS Sumitra aimed to compel pirates to surrender and leave the ship. Warning shots were then fired in the water to pressurise the Somali pirates who had taken control of the vessel the Indian Navy deployed its Advanced Light Helicopter (ALH) Dhruv, which flew over the ship, a psychological tactic used by the Navy to create fear in the mind of the enemy to force a surrender. The Somali pirates were scared to see the Indian Navy and dumped their weapons when INS Sumitra approached closer. Armed with Tavor TAR-21, an Israeli assault rifle and other combat gear, the MARCOS brought the pirates and were disarmed. No injuries were reported in the swift operation conducted by the Navy, which captured Kalashnikovs and several mobile and satellite phones from their possession. The incident took place in Southern Arabian Sea approximately 850 nautical miles west of Kochi, and prevented misuse of these fishing vessels as mother ships for further acts of piracy on Merchant Vessels.

She participated at the International Fleet Review 2026 held at Visakapatanam.

== Gallery ==
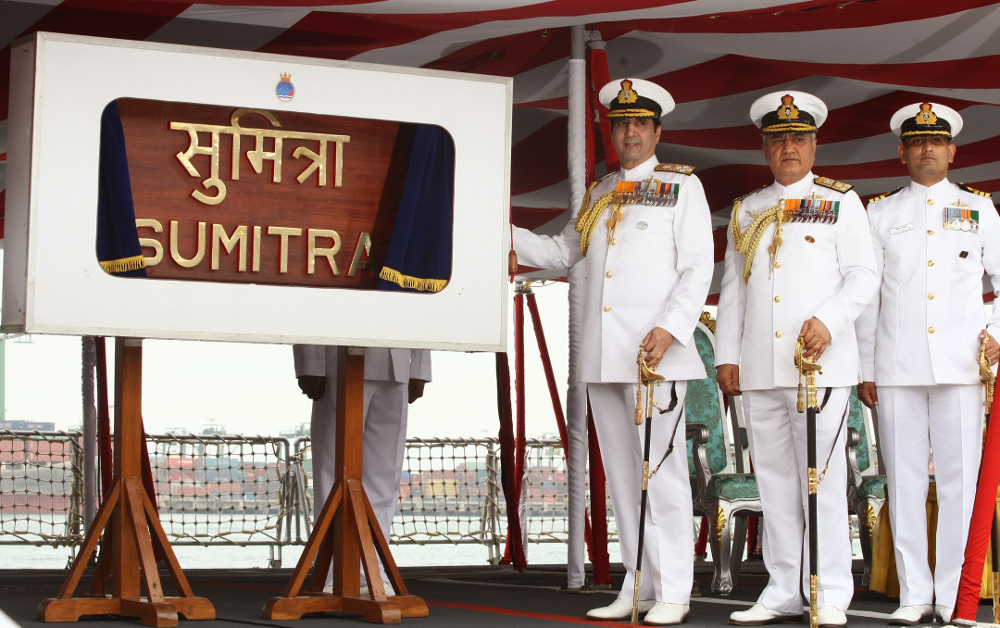
Admiral RK Dhowan, Chief of the Naval Staff, unveiling the plaque of INS Sumitra along with Vice Admiral Satish Soni, FOC-in-C, East and Ships Commanding officer Commander MM Mokashi

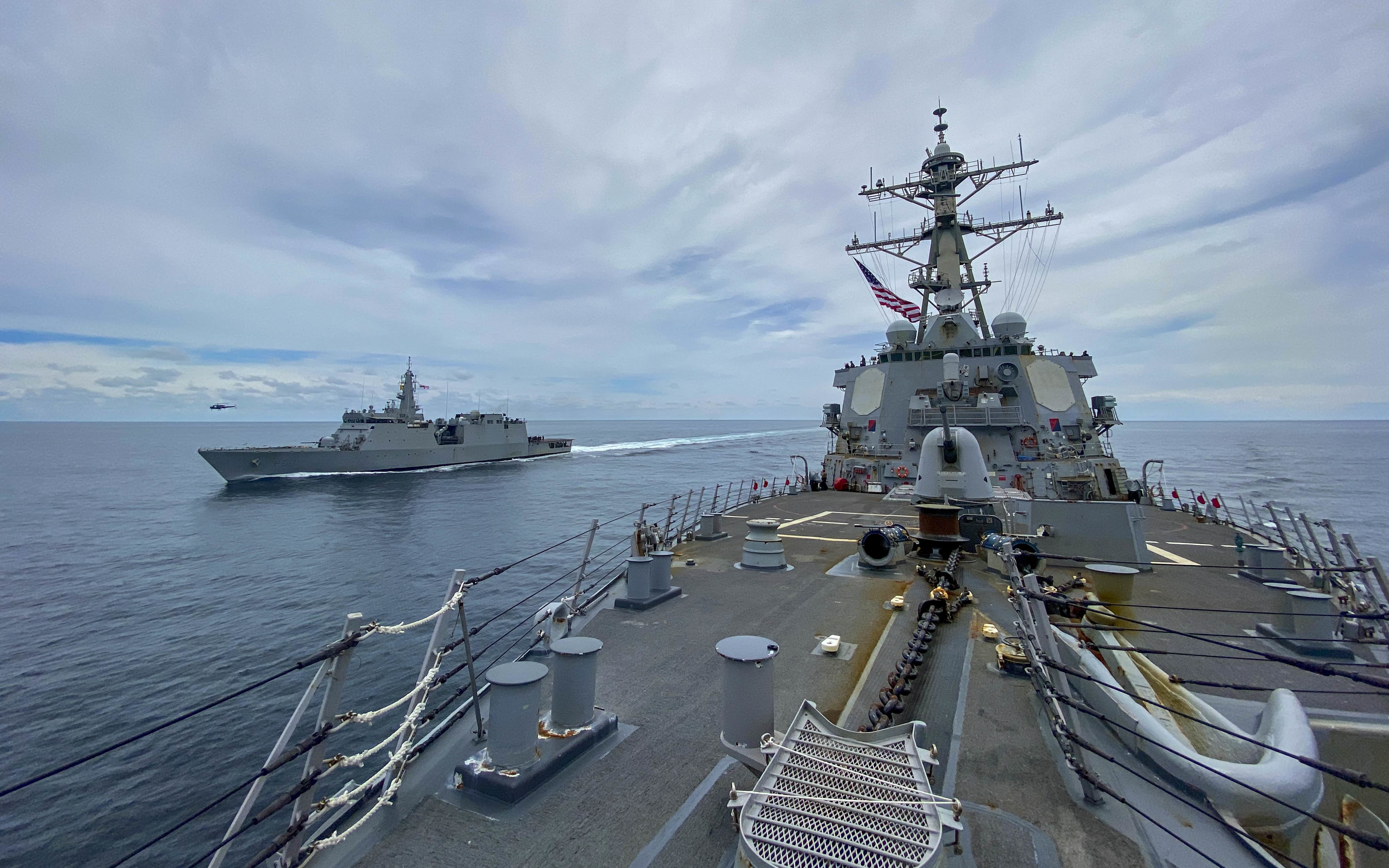
USS Russell (DDG-59) with INS Sumitra during a passex exercise

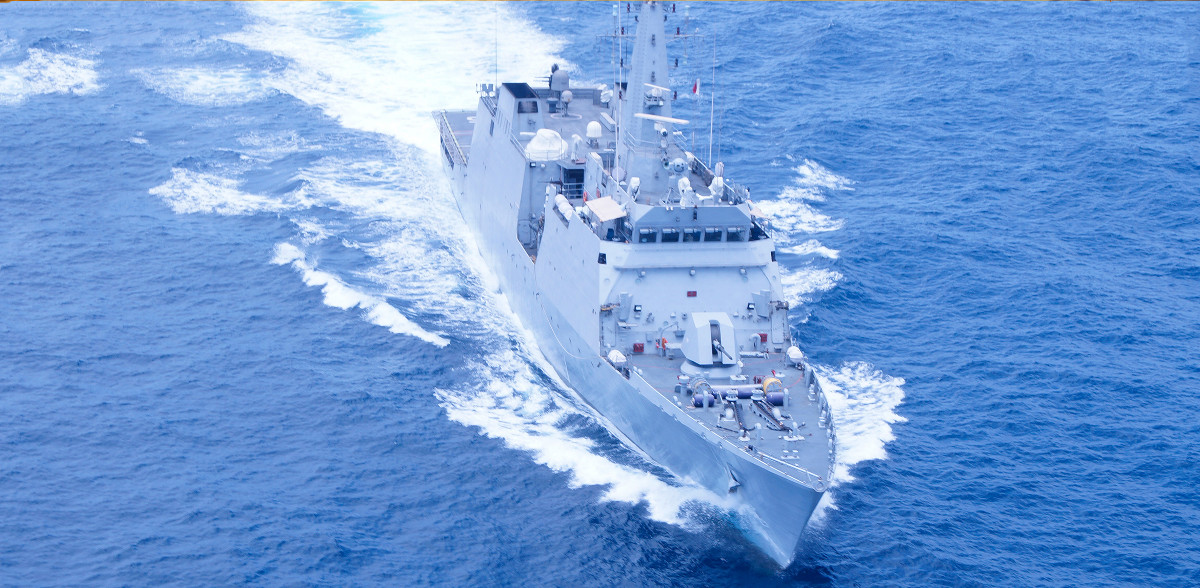
INS Sumitra during her trials

== See also ==
- Sukanya-class patrol vessel
- List of active Indian Navy ships
