= HMS Bombay =

A number of ships of the Royal Navy have borne the name Bombay, after the Indian city of Bombay, now Mumbai. Among them were:

- HMS Bombay (1790) was a storeship in service in 1790.
- HMS Bombay (1805) was a 38-gun fifth rate launched in 1793 for the East India Company. She served as Bombay until the Royal Navy purchased her in 1805. She served with the Royal Navy as HMS Bombay and later HMS Ceylon until she was sold in 1857.
- HMS Bombay (1808) was a 74-gun Leviathan-class third rate launched at Bombay in 1808. She was renamed HMS Blake in 1819 and transferred to harbour service in 1828. She was broken up in 1855.
- HMS Bombay (1828) was an 84-gun second rate launched at Bombay in 1828. She was completed in 1861 as an 81-gun screw powered ship and was burnt by accident 14 miles off Montevideo, Uruguay in 1864.
- HMIS Bombay (1919) was a 125-foot-long (38 m) composite steam trawler used as a patrol vessel and minesweeper from 1919 to 1931.
- HMIS Bombay (1941), later INS Bombay, was a Bathurst-class corvette launched in 1941 and sold in 1960.

There was also HMS Bombay Castle, a 74-gun third rate launched in 1782 and wrecked in 1796. She was ordered under the name Bombay in 1780, but was renamed before her launch.

== See also ==
- 1915–19 and 1939–1940 – Bombay – A Grimsby trawler hired by the Royal Navy and converted into an unarmed auxiliary patrol vessel. Though in Royal Navy service, she was not commissioned and does not count as an HMS Bombay.
- INS Mumbai (D62), named after the same city following that city's name change, seen as the name-successor to HMIS/INS Bombay
- Bombay (ship) for non-Royal Navy and non-Royal Indian Navy ships of this name

== Sources ==
- INS Mumbai – a photo essay
- Colledge, Ships of the Royal Navy
