= INS Tarkash =

2010 Indian Navy frigate

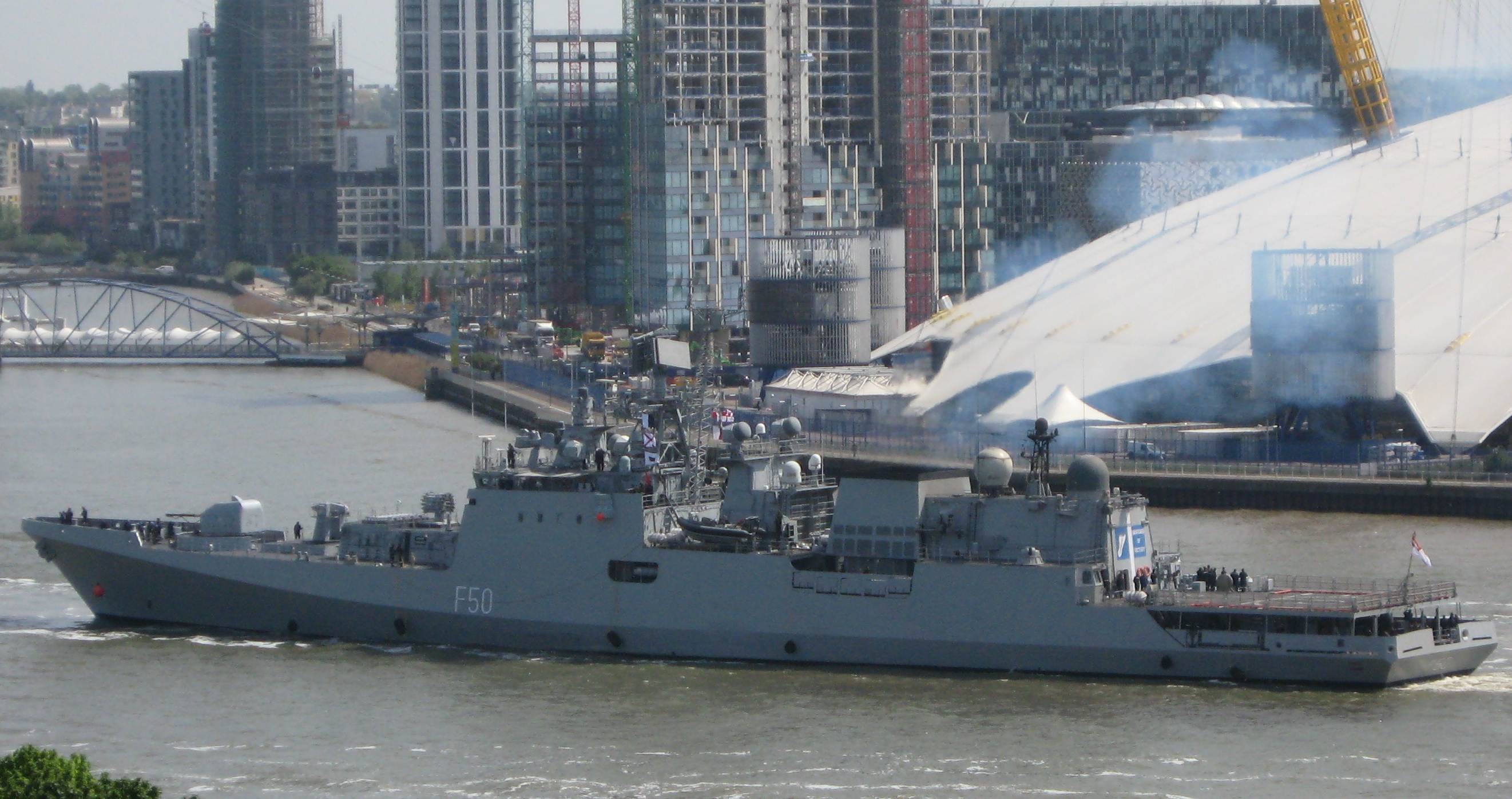
- INS Tarkash (F50), passing the O2 in London in May 2017

History

India
- Name: INS Tarkash
- Namesake: Quiver
- Ordered: 14 July 2007
- Builder: Yantar Shipyard
- Launched: 23 June 2010
- Commissioned: 9 November 2012
- Status: in active service
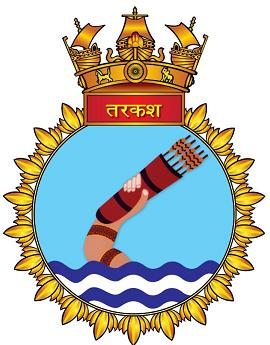
- Badge

General characteristics
- Class & type: Talwar-class frigate
- Displacement: 3,620 long tons (3,678 t) standard; 4,035 long tons (4,100 t) full load
- Length: 124.8 m (409 ft 5 in)
- Beam: 15.2 m (49 ft 10 in)
- Draught: 4.5 m (14 ft 9 in)
- Propulsion: 2 × DS-71 cruise turbines (9,000 shp)); 2 × DT-59 boost turbines (19,500 shp)
- Speed: 30 kn (56 km/h; 35 mph)
- Range: 4,850 nmi (8,980 km; 5,580 mi) at 14 kn (26 km/h; 16 mph); 1,600 nmi (3,000 km; 1,800 mi) at 30 kn (56 km/h; 35 mph)
- Complement: 300 (40 officers)
- Sensors & processing systems: 1 × 3Ts-25E Garpun-B surface search radar; 1 × MR-212/201-1 navigation radar; 1 × Kelvin Hughes Nucleus-2 6000A radar; 1 × Ladoga-ME-11356 intertial navigation and stabilisation; 1 × Fregat M2EM 3D circular scan radar; 1 × Ratep JSC 5P-10E Puma fire-control system; 1 × 3R14N-11356 fire-control system FCS; 4 × MR-90 Orekh; BEL HUMSA (Hull Mounted Sonar Array)
- Electronic warfare & decoys: 1 × TK-25E-5 EWS; 1 × PK-10 ship-borne decoy launching systems; 4 × KT-216 decoy launchers
- Armament: Anti-air missiles: 24 × Shtil-1 medium range missiles; 8 × Igla-1E (SA-16); Anti-ship/Land-attack missiles: 8 × VLS launched BrahMos supersonic, anti-ship cruise missiles; Guns: 1 × 100 mm A-190E, naval gun; 2 × AK-630 CIWS; Anti-submarine warfare: 2 × 2 533 mm torpedo tubes; 1 × RBU-6000 (RPK-8) rocket launcher
- Aircraft carried: 1 × Ka-28 Helix-A, Ka-31 Helix B or HAL Dhruv helicopter

INS Tarkash (F50) (lit. 'Quiver') is the second Talwar-class frigate constructed for the Indian Navy. She is part of the second batch of Talwar-class frigates ordered by the Indian Navy. She was built at the Yantar shipyard in Kaliningrad, Russia. She was commissioned to Navy service on 9 November 2012 at Kaliningrad and joined the Western Naval Command on 27 December 2012.

== Design ==
Tarkash belongs to the second flight (F45, F50, F51) of Talwar class of guided missile frigates. These are modified Krivak III-class frigates built by Russia. These ships use stealth technologies and a special hull design to ensure a reduced radar cross section. Much of the equipment on the ship is Russian-made, but a significant number of systems of Indian origin have also been incorporated. The main difference between Tarkash and the earlier flight of Talwar-class ships (F40, F43, F44) is the use of BrahMos missiles in place of the Klub-N missiles in the earlier ships. It is the second of the three frigates built in Russia as a follow-up order to the first batch of Talwar-class frigates.

== Construction ==
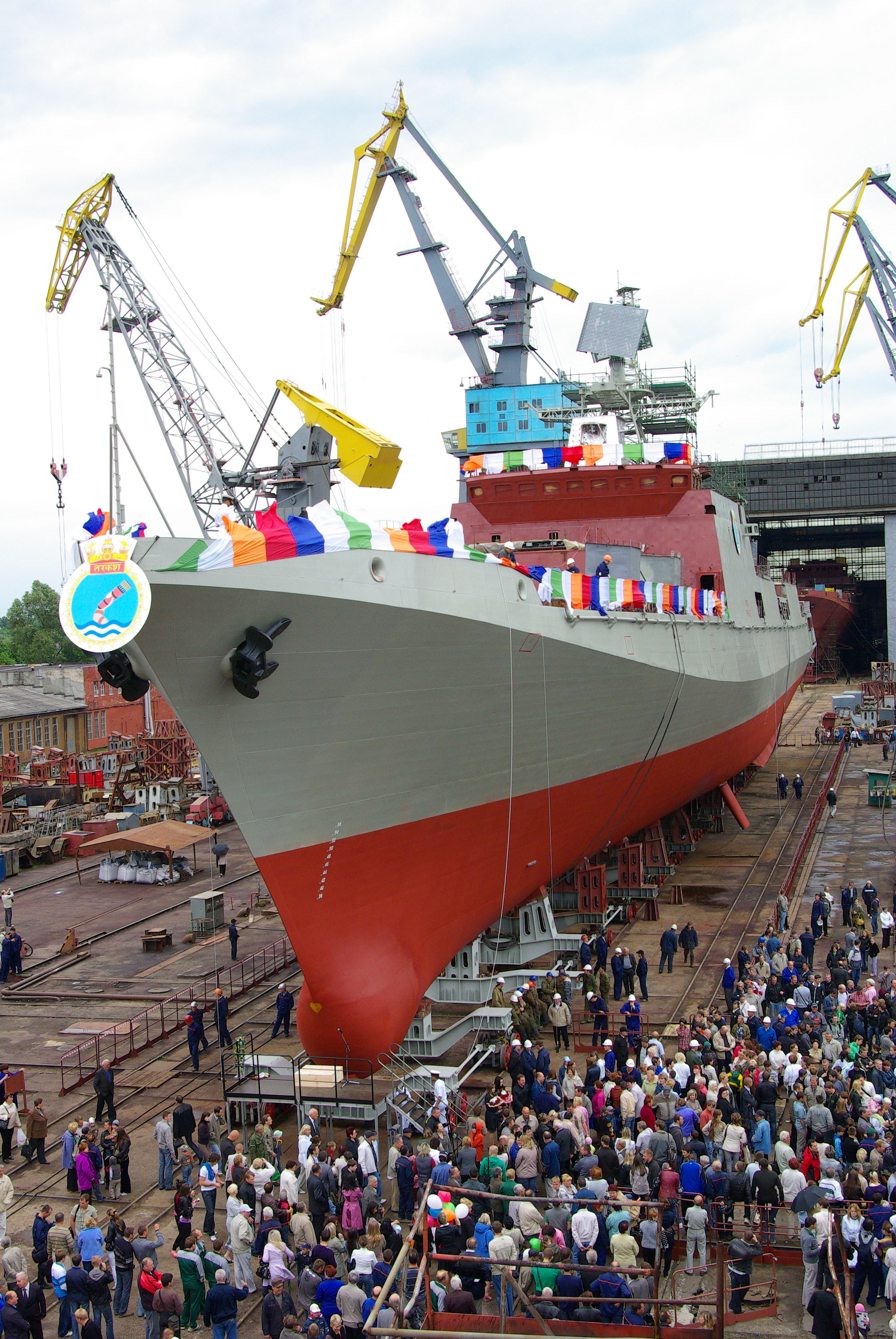
Tarkash being launched at Yantar Shipyard, Kaliningrad, Russia on June 23, 2010

Tarkash was launched on 23 June 2010 at Yantar Shipyard in Kaliningrad, Russia. Her delivery was delayed from the original goal of October 2011 due to labour shortages and delays in equipment deliveries. She departed the Yantar shipyard on 24 May 2012 to begin her sea trials. The sea trials were successfully completed in the month of August 2012.

On 9 November 2012, Tarkash was handed over to the Indian Navy by Yantar Shipyard. She joined the Western Naval Command on 27 December 2012.

== Operations ==
=== Operation Raahat ===
In March 2015, Tarkash was deployed with INS Mumbai and INS Sumitra as part of Operation Raahat to provide protection and support to Indian ships and aircraft involved in the evacuation of Indian citizens from Yemen during the military intervention.

=== Anti Piracy Operations ===
On 14 March 2024, INS Tarkash intercepted the hijacked Bangladeshi MV Abdullah and ensured the safety of the crew members onboard. Maritime Patrol Aircraft P-8I is being used in this operation. The operation was carried out 600 nm east of Somalia coast. On 1 April 2025, Tarkash, supporting Combined Task Force 150 intercepted a dhow following reports from a P-8I and dismantled a Narcotics operations, destroying over 2,500 kilograms of suspected narcotic substances.

=== 2025–present ===
On 4 April 2025, INS Tarkash conducted a PASSEX with the Royal New Zealand Navy's HMNZS Te Kaha (F77) in the Gulf of Aden. The exercise concluded New Zealand led-CTF 150 Joint Focused Operation ANZAC Tiger and included cross-deck landings, boarding drills, and manoeuvres to enhance bilateral maritime interoperability and cooperation.

She also participated at the International Fleet Review 2026 held at Visakapatanam.

From June, Tarkash has been deployed to the South West Indian Ocean Region under commanding officer, Captain Rohit Mishra. For the first port call, she escorted PS Zoroaster of the Seychelles Coast Guard from shipyard of the Garden Reach Shipbuilders & Engineers (GRSE) in Kolkata to her home port, Port Victoria, after her second refit. They reached Port Victoria on 12 June 2026 and Tarkash was open to visitors on 13 June before departed on 15 June. Thereafter, the second port call was taken at Port Louis, Mauritius, between 20 and 22 June. She also participated in the 50th National Day celebrations of Seychelles along with INS Ikshak. Both the ships departed on 29 June.

Between 29 September and 3 October, Tarkash called at the Port of Mombasa, Kenya and conducted a passage exercise with KNS Jasiri (P3124) of the Kenya Navy. From 8 to 21 October, Tarkash took part in the ninth edition of IBSAMAR led by India with the Brazilian Navy and the South African Navy in the Simon’s Town and False Bay areas of South Africa. From 30 October to 3 November, Tarkash called at Port Louis, Mauritius during which she participated in the 192nd Aapravasi Diwas on 2 November and conduced a Passage Exercise (PASSEX) with CGS Valiant of the Mauritius Coast Guard.

== Gallery ==
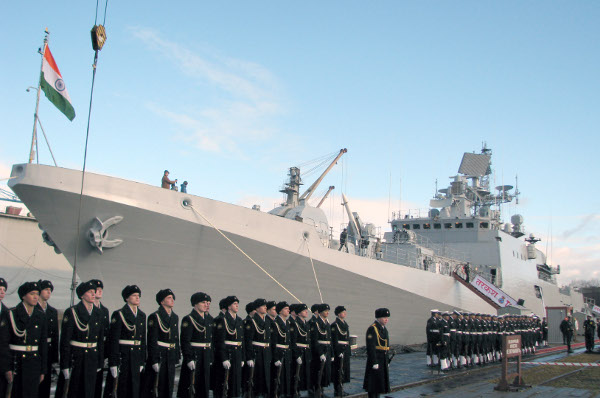
INS Tarkash during its commissioning ceremony.

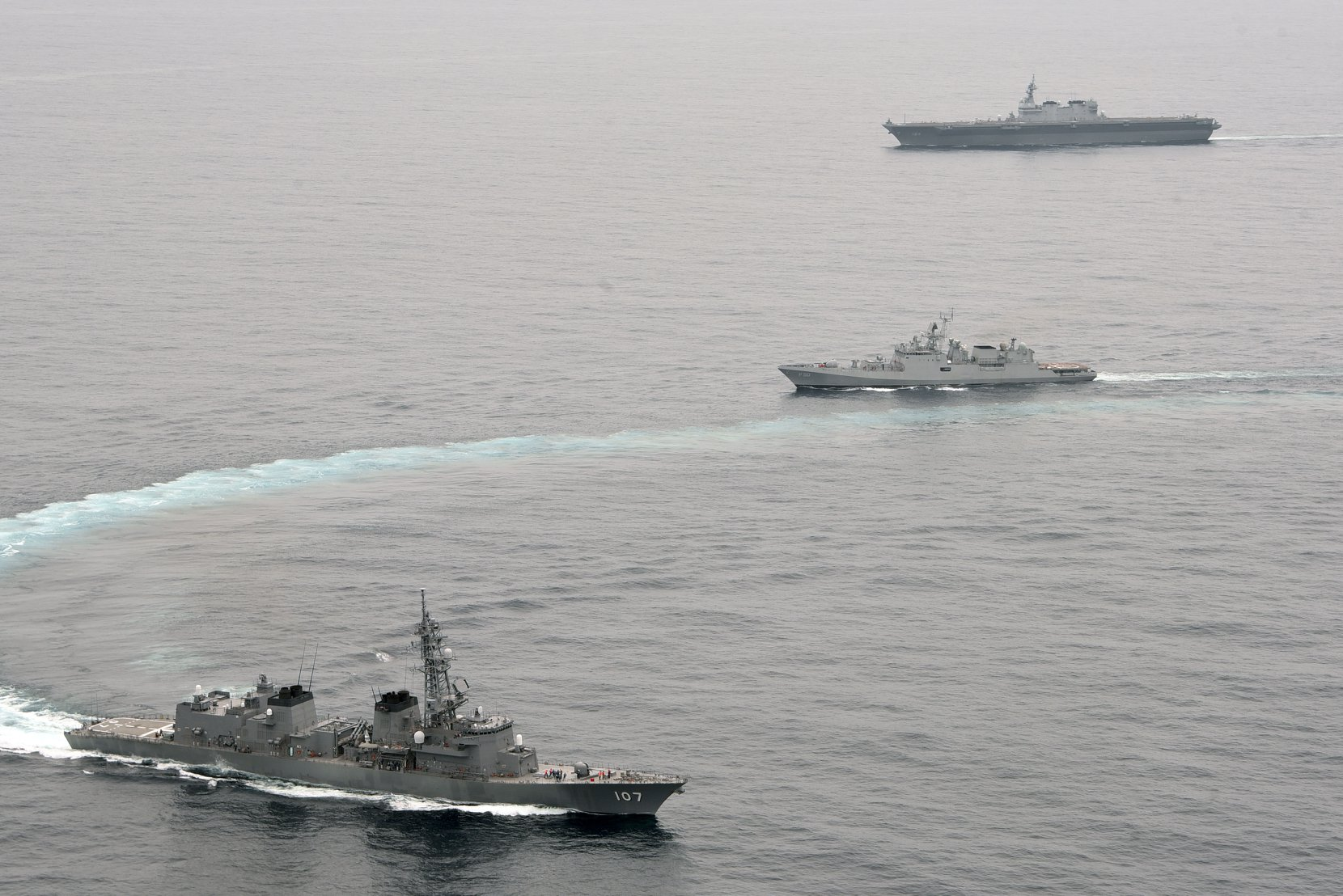
INS Tarkash (F50) with JS Ikazuchi and JS Kaga during JIMEX 2020 exercise.

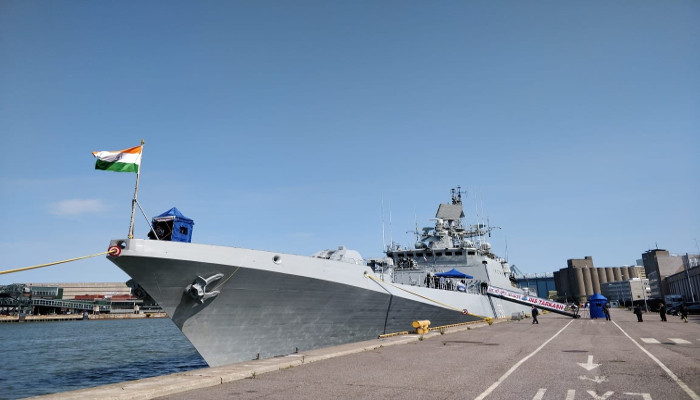
INS Tarkash (F50) at Helsinki, Finland.
