= INS Mumbai =

Guided-missile destroyer of Indian Navy

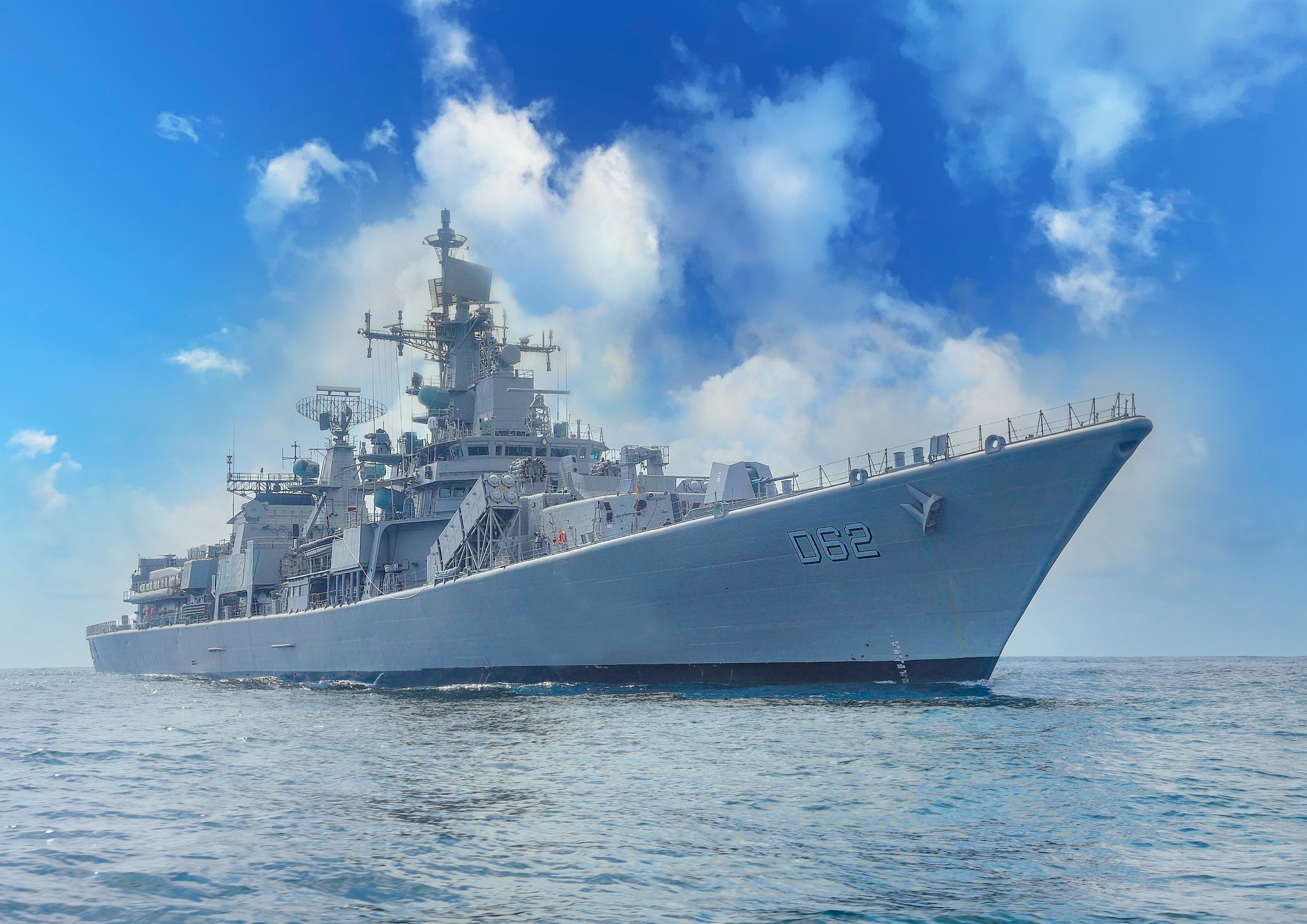
- Mumbai (D62) at sea

History

India
- Name: Mumbai
- Namesake: Mumbai
- Ordered: 20 March 1992
- Builder: Mazagon Dock Limited, India
- Laid down: 12 December 1992
- Launched: 20 March 1995
- Commissioned: 22 January 2001
- Home port
- Identification: Pennant number: D62
- Motto: "Aham Prayptam Tvidametesam Balam" (I am Invincible)
- Status: Active

General characteristics
- Class & type: Delhi-class destroyer
- Type: Guided-missile destroyer
- Displacement: 6,200 tonnes (full)
- Length: 163 m (535 ft)
- Beam: 17 m (56 ft)
- Draught: 6.5 m (21 ft)
- Propulsion: 4 × Zorya-Mashproekt DT-59 gas turbines 82,820 hp (61,760 kW); 2 shafts with cp props
- Speed: 32 knots (59 km/h; 37 mph)
- Range: 4,500 mi (7,200 km) at 18 knots (33 km/h; 21 mph)
- Complement: 350 (incl 40 officers)
- Sensors & processing systems: Fregat M2EM E-band air & surface search radar(300 Km) (Replaced from MR-755 MAE); BEL RAWL (Signaal LW08) D-band air search radar; 3 × MR-212/201 I-band navigation radars; 6 × MR-90 Orekh G-band fire-control radars (FCR); 2 × Elta EL/M 2221 FCR(Barak 1); BEL Lynx U2 FCR (Replaced from MR-184 I/J-band FCR); 2 × MR-123-02 I/J-band FCR; BEL HUMSA hull-mounted sonar; Thales Advanced Towed Array Sonar
- Electronic warfare & decoys: BEL Ellora MK2 Replaced from BEL Ajanta Mk 2 ESM; Kavach (anti-missile system); Towed decoys
- Armament: 8 × BrahMos (Replaced from 16 × Kh-35E); 32 × Barak 1; 2 × Shtil SAM systems (48 missiles); 1 × OTO Melara 76 mm naval gun; Replaced AK-100; 2 × 30 mm AK-630M; 2 × RBU-6000 Launchers; Quintuple 533mm torpedo tubes; 2 rails of depth charges
- Aircraft carried: 2 × Sea King Mk 42B helicopters

INS Mumbai is the third of the Delhi-class guided-missile destroyers in active service with the Indian Navy.

Mumbai was built at Mazagon Dock Limited in her namesake city Mumbai, launched in 1995, and commissioned in 2001. The ship completed its mid-life upgrade in 2023 and joined Eastern Naval Command on 8 December 2023 to replace the retiring Rajput-class destroyers .

The ship's crest depicts the gateway entrance to INS Angre (named as such in honour of Admiral Kanhoji Angre). The gateway has a watch tower with three look-out posts and stands against the backdrop of the ramparts of the fort. Two Ghurabs (or Grabs), depicted on either side of the fort, signify the seafaring traditions of the Marathas. INS Mumbai has been the Flagship for various combat operations like Op Parakram and many Humanitarian Assistance and Disaster Relief (HADR) operations

== Service history ==
=== Operation Sukoon ===
In July 2006, Mumbai was part of Task Force 54, on its way back to India from the Mediterranean, when the Israel-Lebanon conflict broke out. Mumbai was redeployed to assist the evacuation of Indian citizens from Lebanon as a part of Operation Sukoon.

=== Operation Raahat ===
In March 2015, Mumbai was deployed with INS Tarkash and INS Sumitra as part of Operation Raahat to provide protection and support to Indian ships and aircraft involved in the evacuation of Indian citizens from Yemen during the military intervention. For this operation, the ship's commanding officer Captain Rajesh Dhankhar was awarded the Nao Sena Medal for gallantry.

=== Port visits ===
INS Mumbai, commanded by Captain Sandeep Kumar, arrived at the Port of Colombo, Sri Lanka on 26 August 2024 for a three-day formal visit. This marked the eighth visit by an Indian Navy or Coast Guard ship to the nation in 2024. Earlier, INS Kabra, Karanj, Kamorta, and Shalki, along with ICGS Samarth, Abhinav, and Sachet, had also visited Sri Lanka.

The ship is expected to deliver essential spare parts for the Dornier 228 aircraft of the Sri Lankan Air Force. The fleet assists the Air Force in extensive maritime surveillance and search and rescue operations. The Indian Navy supports the Dornier's maintenance with technical teams and spare parts.

=== La Perouse 25 ===
In January 2025, INS Mumbai was mission deployed in South Eastern Indian Ocean Region. On 18 January, the ship reached Jakarta, Indonesia for participating in the fourth edition of the multinational exercise La Perouse 2025. The exercise includes with multiple ships representing eight other navies like Australia (HMAS Hobart), France (Charles de Gaulle and its CSG), United Kingdom (HMS Spey), United States (USS Savannah), Indonesia, Malaysia (KD Lekir, KD Gagah Samudera), Singapore (RSS Independence) and Canada (HMCS Ottawa). The exercise aims to "provide maritime safety with regional partners and multinational coalition assets in the 3 main straits detrimental to commercial shipping" and "sharing information and coordinating their actions against multiple threats thanks to the communication and coordination system IORIS". The exercise will be conducted in two phases. The first phase (16 to 20 January) focusing on Malacca and Sunda straits and the second one (21 to 24 January) focusing on Lombok strait.

=== IFR-2026 ===
INS Mumbai participated at the International Fleet Review 2026 held at Visakapatanam.

== Gallery ==
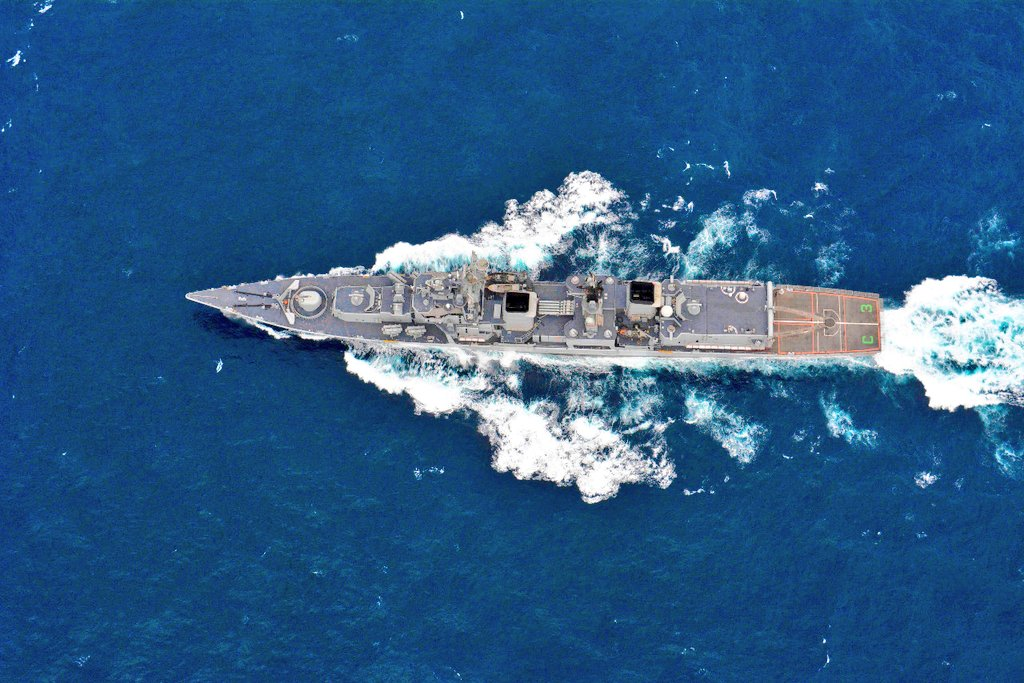
Top view of INS Mumbai (D62).

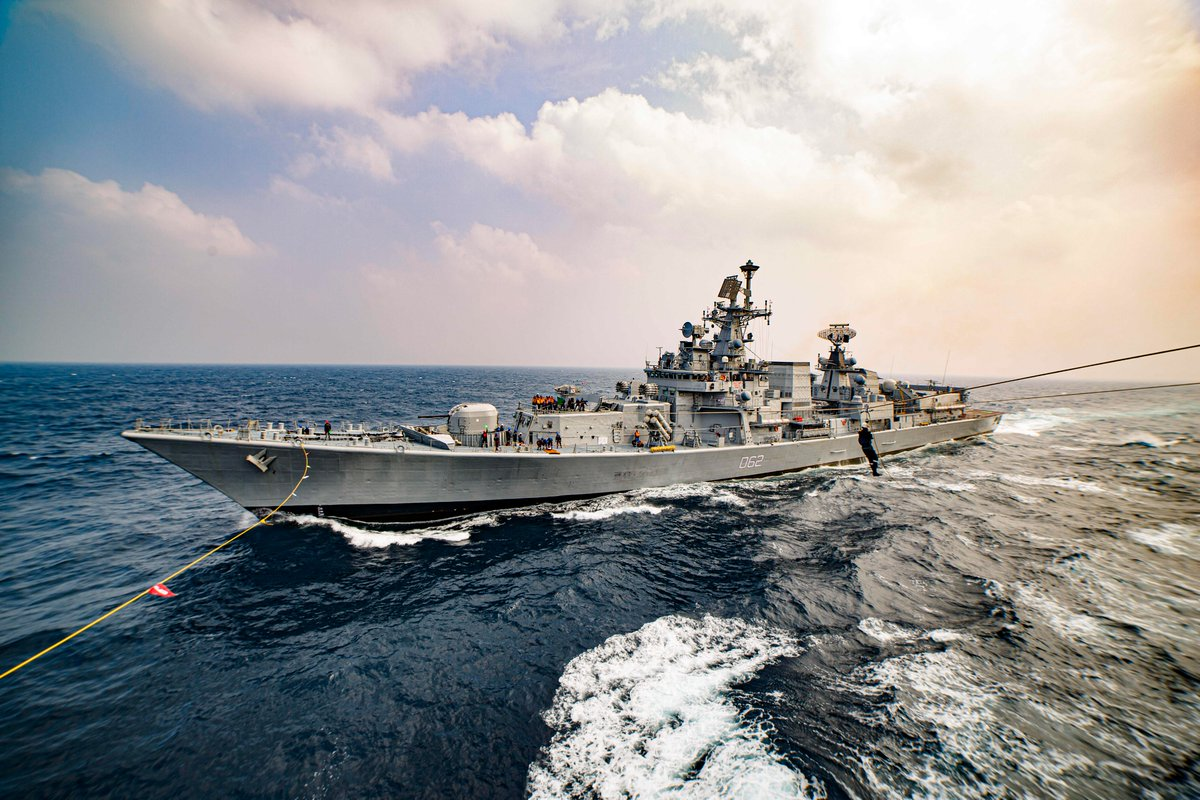
Mumbai (D62) performing transfer of personnel at sea.

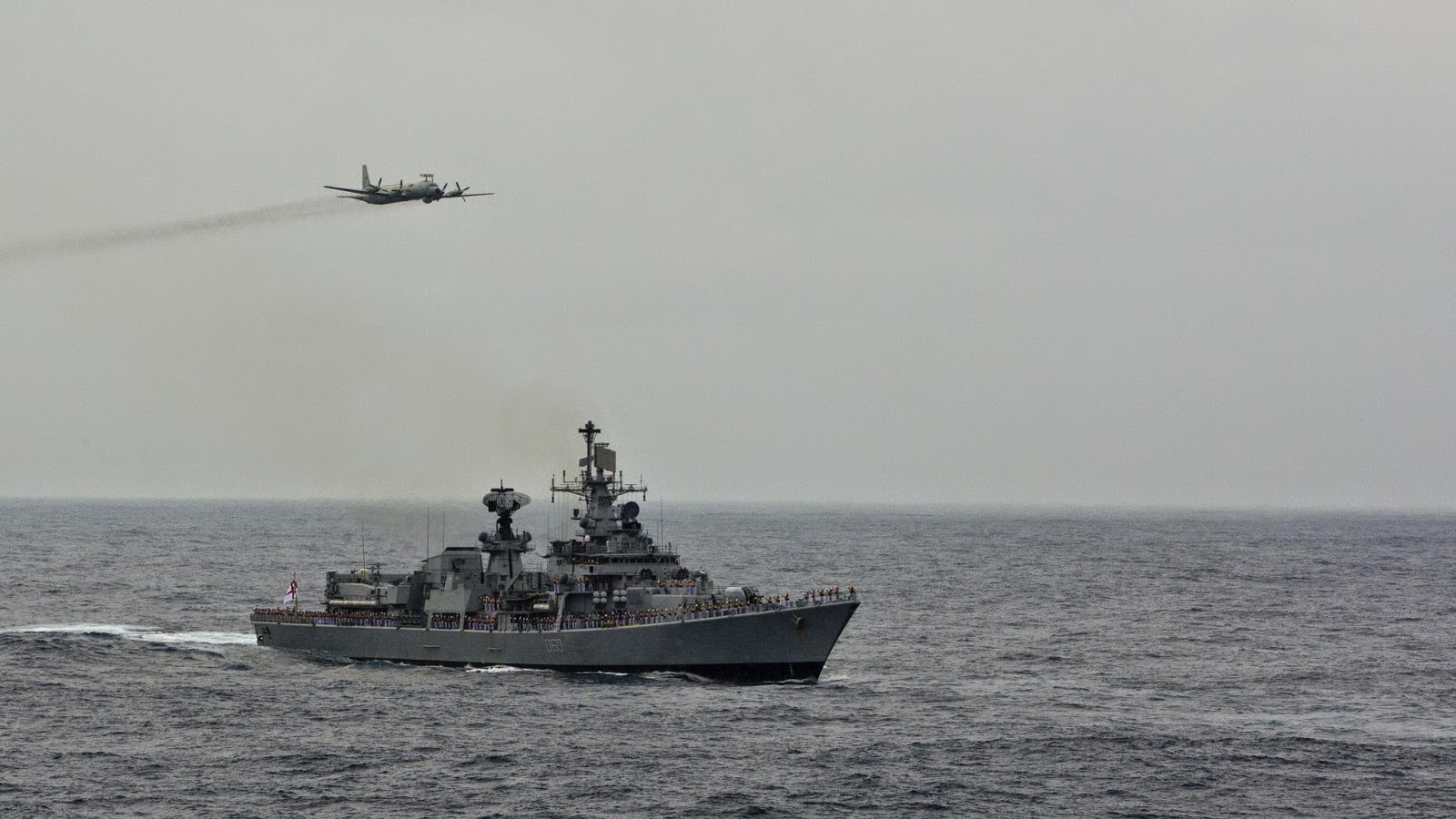
Mumbai along with an Il-38 during an exercise.

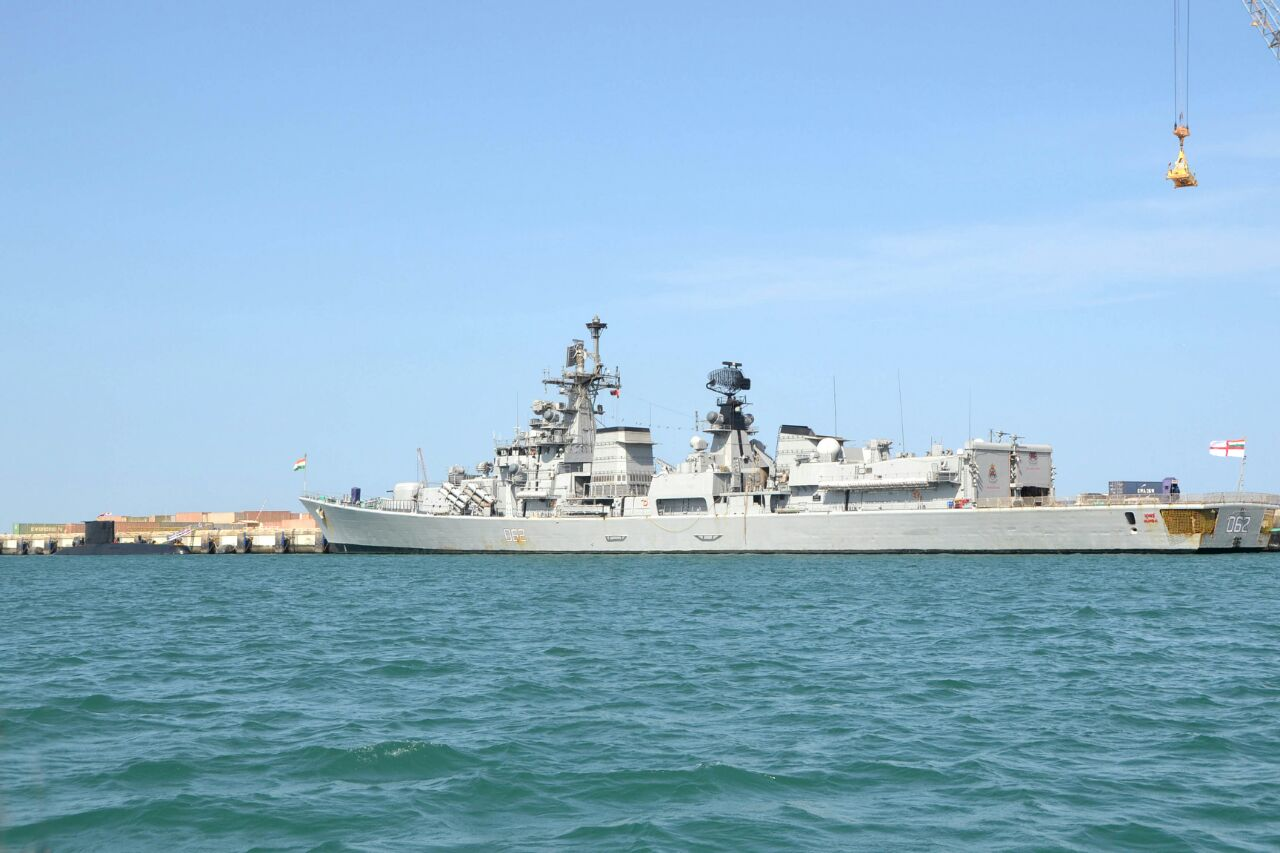
Mumbai enters Port of Duqm in Oman.

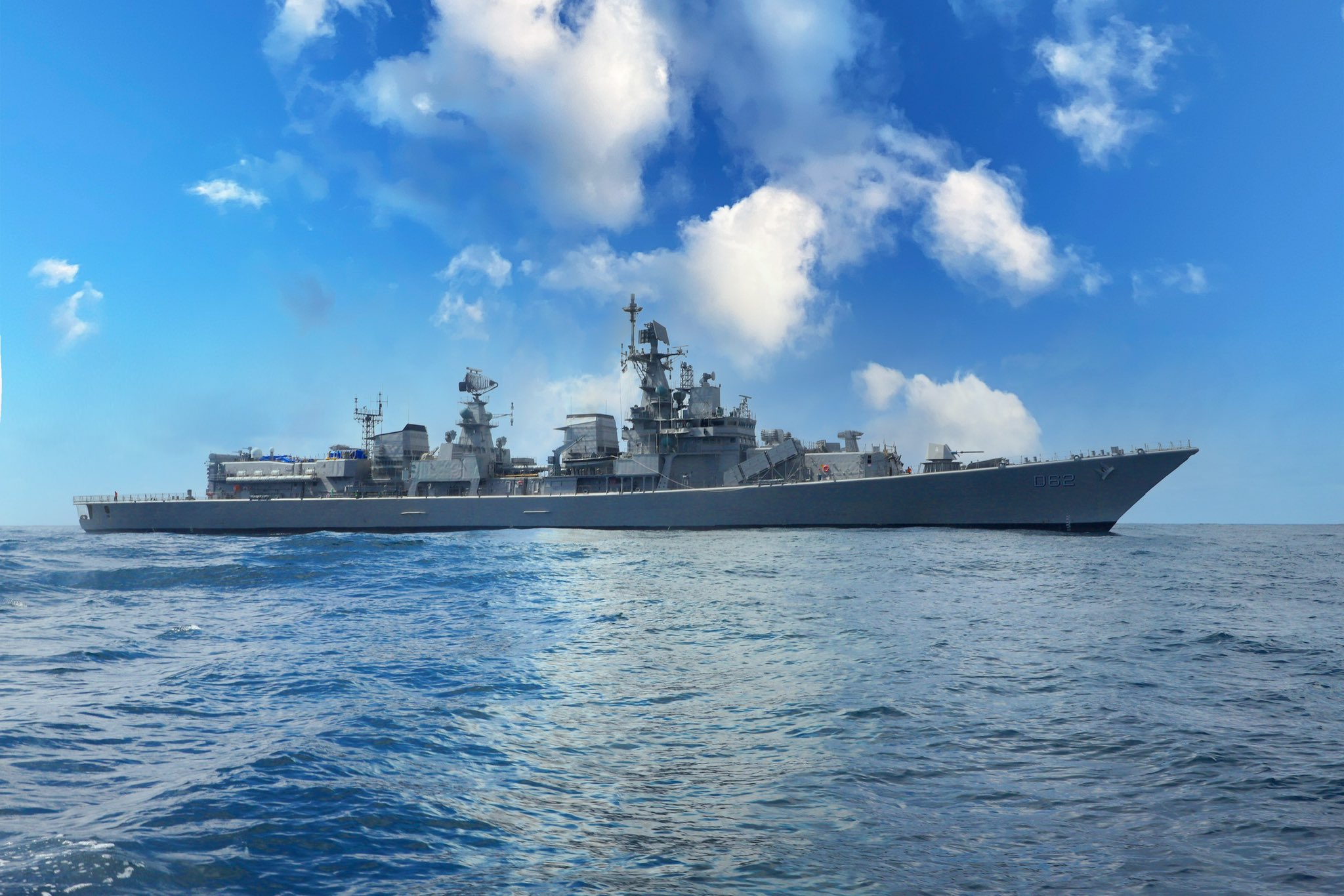
Mumbai (D62), Delhi class destroyer at sea

== See also ==
- HMIS Bombay
