= Martin Henry St. Leger Nott =

Officer of the Royal Indian Navy

Commodore M. H. St. L. Nott DSO, OBE
- Born: 30 June 1904
- Died: 27 March 1948 (aged 43); Corsica, France
- Military career
- Allegiance: British Raj; India
- Branch: Royal Indian Marine (1924–1934); Royal Indian Navy (1934–1948)
- Service years: 1924–1948
- Rank: Commodore
- Commands: Cochin Command; HMIS Monze; HMIS Narbada (U40); HMIS Investigator (1932); HMIS Pansy; HMIS Ramdas
- Conflicts: World War II
- Awards: Distinguished Service Order; Officer of the Order of the British Empire; Mentioned in dispatches (2)

Commodore Martin Henry St. Leger Nott, DSO, OBE was an Officer in the Royal Indian Navy. He was the first Chief of Staff to the Commander-in-Chief, Royal Indian Navy after the Independence of India. He died in a plane crash with his family at Mont Cardo, near Corsica, France, at the age of 43.

Nott was regarded as a visionary officer who worked to build the fledgling Indian Navy in her early years after Independence. He is credited with drawing up the plans of the expansion of the RIN, having led the development of the first ten-year plan paper. He was also regarded as an outstanding seaman, excellent staff officer and a great administrator. As the Naval officer-in-charge Cochin, he saw potential and advocated the development and expansion of the naval base in Cochin.

== Early life ==
Nott was born on 30 June 1904 to Major Lewis Herbert William Nott, an officer in the British Army and Hilda Mary Stephens.

== Naval career ==
Nott joined the Royal Indian Marine (RIM) at the age of 17 as a midshipman in 1921. He was promoted to the rank of sub-lieutenant on 15 October 1924. He specialised in signals and communication and spent his early years based out of Bombay at HMIS Dalhousie. After three years in the rank of Sub-Lieutenant, he was promoted to the rank of lieutenant on 15 October 1927. On 2 October 1934, the RIM was renamed Royal Indian Navy (RIN). The next year, with 8 years service, he was promoted to lieutenant commander on 15 October 1935.

In the 1938 New Year Honours, Nott was awarded the Officer of the Order of the British Empire, Later that year, he was selected to attend the Royal Naval College, Greenwich, the staff course starting on 10 January 1939. He was the only RIN officer to attend the course where he and Sir Gerald Gladstone, who rose to become the Commander-in-Chief, Far East Fleet were course-mates.

=== World War II ===
With the outbreak of World War II in September 1939, Nott was appointed commanding officer of the auxiliary patrol vessel HMIS Ramdas. Since the Ramdas was off Karachi, he was also in charge of the Karachi naval defence flotilla. On 2 February 1940, he moved to Calcutta and took command of the survey ship HMIS Investigator and was in charge of the local naval defence flotilla. In March, he took command of the Cornwallis-class sloop HMIS Pansy and was back in command of the Investigator in April. In July, he moved to the Boys' training establishment at Karachi – HMIS Bahadur.

In February 1941, Nott was appointed on the staff of the Commander-in-Chief, East Indies Station Admiral Sir Ralph Leatham. The East Indies Station was headquartered at HMS Lanka in Colombo and Nott served as the liaison officer to the C-in-C. In August 1940, Italy invaded British Somaliland annexing it. In early 1941, Operation Appearance was being planned to re-take British Somaliland. Nott played an important part in the arrangements for seaborne supplies for the advancing forces in Italian Somaliland. On 19 April 1941, he was promoted to the acting rank of commander. For good services in operations off the coast of Italian East Africa, he was mentioned in dispatches on 30 September 1941. He was appointed Staff Officer (Operations) to the Senior Naval Officer, Persian Gulf. He subsequently moved to the Royal Naval base in the Persian Gulf – HMS Seabelle. For his services in the Persian Gulf, he was mentioned in dispatches for the second time. In September 1941, he moved to Naval headquarters as the Staff Officer (Plans). During this tenure, on 28 May 1942, he was promoted to the substantive rank of commander. He subsequently worked towards dealing with the menace of Japanese submarines in the Arabian Sea.

On 1 January 1944, Nott was promoted to the acting rank of captain. On 21 March 1944, he was appointed commanding officer of the modified Black Swan-class sloop HMIS Narbada (U40), the flagship of the Royal Indian Navy. He also directed the operations as the Senior Naval Commander of the bombarding force for Japanese positions on the Arakan coast. The task force consisting of Narbada and the Black Swan-class sloop HMIS Jumna (U21), was part of a larger British task force which bombarded Japanese positions at Isla Pulo at the entrance of the Malacca Strait. For his courage, tenacity and devotion to duty in operations lasting four months, frequently performed under rapidly changing conditions and with difficult lines of communication, on the Arakan Coast, Nott was awarded the Distinguished Service Order. After the Surrender of Japan, the Narbada sailed to Andaman waters and Nott accepted the surrender of the Japanese Brigadier in command of the Car Nicobar garrison onboard the ship.

=== Post-war career ===
In mid-1945, Nott moved to Karachi as the Naval Officer-in-Charge (NOIC), based out of HMIS Monze. On 1 November 1945, he was appointed Director of Training and Education at Naval HQ. This stint was to be of immense help post-Independence when most of the training establishments were allotted to Pakistan. In April 1946, Nott was appointed Chief Staff Officer (CSO) to the Flag Officer Bombay (FOB), Rear Admiral Arthur Rullion Rattray. After a short stint, in February 1947, he took command of HMIS Venduruthy as the Naval Officer-in-charge Cochin. Soon after taking over, he saw the potential of the base and envisioned the development of Cochin as a combined training base. With Nott's efforts, multiple training establishments were set up in Cochin. On 31 May 1947, he was promoted to the substantive rank of captain.

=== Post-Independence ===
After the partition of India, Nott's services were loaned to India. On 15 August 1947, was constituted Commodore 2nd class and appointed Chief of Staff (COS) to the Commander-in-Chief, Royal Indian Navy. The Chief of Staff to the C-in-C was the de facto second in command of the RIN. This appointment was re-designated Deputy Commander-in-Chief in 1949, Deputy Chief of the Naval Staff in 1955 and Vice Chief of the Naval Staff in 1967. In late-1947, the Navy participated in the Annexation of Junagadh, responsible for landing troops and equipment on the Kathiawar coast. Nott led the planning and control of the operation. The naval force consisted of the frigates – HMIS Kistna (U46), HMIS Cauvery (U10), HMIS Jumna (U21), the minesweepers – HMIS Konkan (J228), HMIS Madras (J237), HMIS Rohilkand (J180), three LSTs and a Motor launch ML 420. The force was under the command of Commander Ram Dass Katari.

As COS, Nott was responsible for the planning of the expansion of the Navy for an Independent India. He led the development of the first Plans paper and handpicked Commander Adhar Kumar Chatterji to head the plans directorate and Lieutenant Commander Nilakanta Krishnan as staff officer (plans). The plans paper Outline Plan for the Reorganisation and Development of the Indian Navy visualised four roles for the Navy:

- To safeguard Indian shipping.
- To ensure that supplies could reach and leave by sea in all circumstances.
- To prevent an enemy landing on India's shores.
- To support the Army in sea borne operations.

His paper called for the building of a completely Indian-manned force consisting of two light aircraft carriers, three cruisers, eight destroyers, four submarines and "such smaller ships as were necessary for training and auxiliary purposes." It also envisioned the formation of two fleets, each to be built around a light fleet carrier. As a result of the first phase of his plan, the Leander-class cruiser HMS Achilles (70) was acquired in 1948 and christened INS Delhi (C74). Three destroyers – HMS Rotherham (H09), HMS Redoubt (H41) and HMS Raider (H15) were also acquired and renamed INS Rajput (D141), INS Ranjit (1949) and INS Rana (D115).

== Personal life ==
Nott married Rosemary Kathleen Dampier Terry of London in August 1939. The couple had a son. Nott, Rosemary and their son, all perished in an air crash.

== Death and legacy ==
On 27 March 1948, Nott was proceeding to the United Kingdom on deputation. He, along with his wife Rosemary and son, were on an Indian National Airways Ltd flight. The Vickers VC.1 Viking aircraft crashed near Mont Cardo near Corsica. His death came as a shock to the Navy. Nott was the architect of the ten-year plan and was looking forward enthusiastically to implement the paper. According to Krishnan, he was regarded as an outstanding seaman, excellent staff officer and a great administrator. The first Indian Chief of Naval Staff Admiral Katari considered Nott to be the most efficient officer of the Royal Navy deputed to the Indian Navy. His vision of a two-fleet navy became a reality in 1971, when the Eastern Fleet was formed.

The Ministry of Defence called him "one of the Navy's most efficient and enterprising officers." A special memorial service was held for him attended by the Minister of Defence Sardar Baldev Singh and high-ranking officers of the RIN, the Indian Army and the Royal Indian Air Force. The Commander-in-Chief, Royal Indian Navy Rear Admiral John Talbot Savignac Hall, the officiating Chief of the Air Staff Air Vice Marshal Subroto Mukerjee, Lieutenant General Dudley Russell and Major General S. M. Shrinagesh were in attendance. After Nott's death, Commodore Ajitendu Chakraverti took over as the officiating Chief of Staff after Nott's death, thus becoming the first Indian to be promoted to the rank of Commodore. The Naval headquarters awards an annual Commodore Nott prize for the best essay on naval matters.

== See also ==
- Deputy Chief of the Naval Staff
- Southern Naval Command

== Bibliography ==
- Singh, Satyindra (1986), Under two ensigns: The Indian Navy, 1945–1950, Oxford & IBH Pub. Co, ISBN 978-8120400948
- Singh, Satyindra (1991), Blueprint to bluewater: The Indian Navy, 1951–65, Lancer International, ISBN 978-8170621485
- Nanda, S.M. (2015), The man who bombed Karachi, HarperCollins, ISBN 978-8172235628
- Krishnan, Arjun (2014), A sailor's story, Punya Publications, ISBN 978-8189534141
- Hiranandani, G.M. (1999), Transition to Triumph: History of the Indian Navy, 1965–1975, Spantech & Lancer, ISBN 978-1897829721
- Katari, Ram Dass (1983), A Sailor Remembers, Vikas, ISBN 9780706920642

Military offices
New title First holder	Deputy Chief of the Naval Staff (as Chief of Staff to the Commander-in-Chief, RIN); 1947–1948	Succeeded by Ajitendu Chakraverti
