= S. G. Karmarkar =

Indian navy admiral

Rear Admiral S G Karmarkar MBE
- Born: 17 October 1912
- Died: 1988
- Military career
- Allegiance: British Raj; India
- Branch: Royal Navy; Royal Indian Navy; Indian Navy
- Service years: 1927–1964
- Rank: Rear Admiral
- Commands: Bombay Command; Cochin Command; Naval Dockyard (Mumbai); INS Angre; INS Delhi (C74); HMIS Talwar; HMIS Kistna (U46); HMIS Madras (J237); HMIS Ratnagiri
- Conflicts: World War II
- Awards: Member of the Order of the British Empire

Rear Admiral Sadashiv Ganesh Karmarkar, MBE (17 October 1912 – 1988) was a flag officer in the Indian Navy. He was the first Indian officer to command a ship of the Royal Indian Navy. During World War II, he commanded the auxiliary patrol vessel HMIS Ratnagiri, for which he was awarded the Member of the Order of the British Empire (MBE). He later became the first Indian to command British officers, when he commanded the sloop HMIS Kistna. He last served as the Flag Officer Bombay, from 1960 to 1964, before retiring.

== Naval career ==
=== Early career ===
The Indian Mercantile Marine Training Ship Dufferin was established in 1927 to train young men for India's marine service. Karmarkar was successful in the entrance examination and joined the first batch of Indian-entry officers. His course-mate, who topped the batch, was Ram Dass Katari, who became the first Indian chief of the naval staff. The batch trained on the Dufferin until 1930. Karmarkar graduated ranked 6th in overall merit.

=== World War II ===
With the outbreak of World War II in September 1939, Karmarkar was commissioned as a temporary lieutenant in the Royal Naval Reserve (RNR). He was posted to the Royal Naval base in Aden - HMS Sheba. On 15 June 1940, he was transferred from the RNR to the Royal Indian Naval Reserve (RINR) and his RNR commission was terminated. The next day, on 16 June 1940, he was transferred to HMIS Dalhousie in Bombay in the rank of lieutenant.

On 21 December 1940, he was appointed commanding officer (CO) of the auxiliary patrol vessel HMIS Ratnagiri, the first Indian officer to command a ship. The Commander-in-Chief, East Indies requested three anti-submarine patrol vessels for operations in the Red Sea. The Ratnagiri, apart from Netravati and Parvati was despatched. After arriving in the Rea Sea, she was sent to Port Sudan. From February 1941, she was tasked with troop and supplies transport. Starting from 11 February to about May, Ratnagiri made multiple trips ferrying troops and supplies from Port Sudan to Mersa Taclai. In spite of risky conditions like underwater reefs and mines, Karmarkar led Ratnagiri to land 750 Free French troops. He later led the ship to ferry Indian, British and African troops. In September that year, Karmarkar led the Ratnagiri to evacuate Yemeni nationals from French Somaliland. For his exemplary command of the ship, Karmarkar was awarded the Member of the Order of the British Empire on 1 January 1942.

On 1 December 1942, Karmarkar was promoted to the acting rank of lieutenant commander and given command of the Bathurst-class minesweeper HMIS Madras. The Madras was part of the East Indies Fleet and he led the ship on multiple escort missions. In April 1944, Karmarkar was posted to the boys' training establishment HMIS Bahadur in Karachi. Shortly afterward, on 30 June, he was promoted to the acting rank of commander. On 30 November 1944, Karmarkar was appointed commanding officer of the Black Swan-class sloop HMIS Kistna and became the first Indian officer to command British officers. He led the Kistna as escort to convoys as part of the East Indies Fleet.

After the war, in early 1946, the 56th Services Selection Board was set up at Lonavla to screen the RINR and Royal Indian Naval Volunteer Reserve (RINVR) officers for a permanent commission in the RIN. Karmarkar was appointed a member of the board. He then received orders to take command of HMIS Talwar, just before the Royal Indian Navy mutiny broke out. Karmarkar, along with Katari and S. N. Kohli met with the future Prime Minister Jawaharlal Nehru in Mumbai and discussed about the mutiny.

=== Post-Independence ===
In 1947, Karmarkar took command of HMIS Hamla, the training establishment in Bombay. After a short stint, he moved to Naval headquarters as director of personnel services (DPS). On 8 October 1949, he was promoted to the acting rank of captain and appointed chief of administration (COA) at NHQ, replacing Captain B. S. Soman. As the COA, he double-hatted as the chief of materiel.

In 1948, the cruiser INS Delhi was purchased from the United Kingdom. She was commissioned on 5 July 1948, with Captain H.N.S. Brown as the commanding officer and became the flagship of the Indian Navy. In October 1950, Karmarkar became the second Indian to command the Delhi, when he took over from Captain A. K. Chatterji. Under him, Delhi served as the flagship of the Rear Admiral Commanding Indian Naval Squadron (RACINS) Rear Admiral Geoffrey Barnard and had Commander B. A. Samson as the executive officer. As the commanding officer of the Delhi, Karmarkar received a plaque from the Government of New Zealand, in recognition of her services to New Zealand and as a goodwill gesture to India. In her earlier avatar, the Delhi was HMNZS Achilles and served in the Royal New Zealand Navy. The plaque, with the crests of both Achilles and Delhi was presented by the New Zealand Trade Commissioner in India.

On 31 May 1951, the Delhi escorted by the R-class destroyers INS Rajput, INS Ranjit and INS Rana and the frigates INS Jamuna, INS Kaveri and INS Sutlej sailed from Bombay, on a six-week goodwill cruise to East Africa and Madagascar. The RACINS Rear Admiral Barnard flew his flag on the Karmarkar's Delhi. On the ship were also embarked, the Commander-in-Chief, Indian Navy Vice Admiral Sir Edward Parry and the air officer commanding Operational Command, Air Commodore Arjan Singh. The C-in-C and the AOC disembarked at Cochin and the Indian Naval squadron continued on its cruise.

The squadron with Karmarkar as the flag captain called on Mombasa, Dar es Salaam, Diego Suarez. While at Mombasa, Jomo Kenyatta, the future first prime minister and president of Kenya visited the Delhi. He stayed on board the ship for a few days, being accommodated in Karmarkar's cabin. While returning to India, it called on Addu Atoll in the Maldives. Karmarkar later added about his ship, "The Delhi stood out majestically with great dignity and slick appearance." After a two-year stint as CO of Delhi, in September 1952, Karmarkar was appointed Captain Indian Naval Barracks (CAPBRAX) and commanding officer of INS Angre in Bombay. He relinquished command, handing over to Captain R. S. David in January 1953. In March 1954, he succeeded Captain Ajitendu Chakraverti as Captain Superintendent Indian Naval Dockyard in Bombay. He served as the Captain Superintendent for about two-and-a-half years, till November 1956.

In November 1956, Karmarkar was promoted to commodore appointed the next Commodore-in-Charge Cochin (COMCHIN). He took over from Commodore B. S. Soman in early 1957. In August 1958, the Indian fleet, commanded by Rear Admiral Ajitendu Chakraverti, conducted exercises with the Royal Navy off Cochin. Karmarkar, as the COMCHIN, was responsible for the logistical support and providing shore facilities for smooth functioning of the exercises. Under Karmarkar, the first armament depot was opened at Aluva in 1958. In March 1960, the Indian fleet again participated in the Commonwealth Joint exercises and training (JET) which was the largest till then, with the Royal Navy, Royal Australian Navy, Royal Ceylon Navy, Pakistan Navy, Royal New Zealand Navy and Royal Malaysian Navy participating. This was also supported by the Cochin Command, with Karmarkar as COMCHIN.

=== Flag rank ===
After about three-and-a-half years building the Cochin command, Karmarkar was promoted to the acting rank of rear admiral and appointed Flag Officer Bombay (FOB) in April 1960. The Bombay Command was the precursor of the current Western Naval Command. He was promoted to the substantive rank of rear admiral on 16 June 1960.

In November 1961, India's first aircraft carrier INS Vikrant, commanded by Captain P. S. Mahindroo, reached home waters. She was welcomed by the flagship INS Mysore and aircraft of the Indian Air Force. The same day, the Prime Minister of India, Jawaharlal Nehru and the Chief of the Naval Staff Vice Admiral Katari visited her at Bombay. As the FOB, Karmarkar was among the senior officers welcoming the ship and the Prime Minister.

Karmarkar had a long tenure of over four years as Flag Officer Bombay. In 1964, he relinquished command, handing over to Rear Admiral R. S. David. He was then placed on the retired list on 16 June 1964. He died in 1988 following an operation, and was cremated in Pune with full military honours.

== See also ==
- Admiral Ram Dass Katari

== Bibliography ==
- Katari, Ram Dass (1983), A Sailor Remembers, Vikas, ISBN 9780706920642
- Collins, D.J.E. (1964), The Royal Indian Navy, 1939-45, Combined Inter-services Historical Section, India & Pakistan; distributors: Orient Longmans, Bombay
- Hore, Peter (2012), Dreadnought to Daring: 100 Years of Comment, Controversy and Debate in The Naval Review, Seaforth Publishing
- Thomas, Commander Anup (2019), Pride & Honour- Biography of Admiral R.L. Pereira, PVSM, AVSM, Southern Naval Command, Indian Navy, ISBN 978-8193600115
- Singh, Satyindra (1986), Under two ensigns: The Indian Navy, 1945-1950, Oxford & IBH Pub. Co, ISBN 978-8120400948
- Singh, Satyindra (1991), Blueprint to bluewater: The Indian Navy, 1951-65, Lancer International, ISBN 978-8170621485

Military offices
Preceded by Bhaskar Sadashiv Soman	Flag Officer Bombay; 1960–1964	Succeeded by R. S. David
Preceded by Bhaskar Sadashiv Soman	Commodore-in-Charge Cochin; 1956–1960	Succeeded by R. S. David
Preceded by Adhar Kumar Chatterji	Commanding officer INS Delhi; 1950–1953	Succeeded by Adhar Kumar Chatterji
Preceded by Bhaskar Sadashiv Soman	Chief of Materiel; 1949–1950	Succeeded by G. S. Kapoor
