= Sardarilal Mathradas Nanda =

Indian naval officer (1915–2009)

Admiral S M Nanda PVSM, AVSM
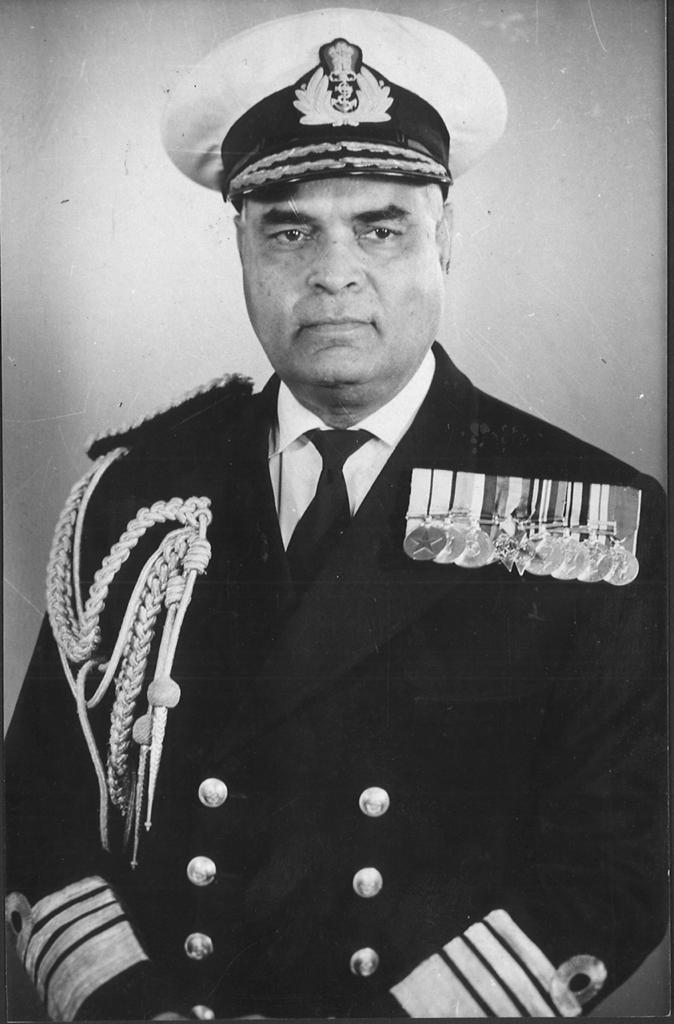
- Admiral Nanda as Chief of Naval Staff

6th Chief of the Naval Staff
- In office 28 February 1970 – 28 February 1973
- President: V. V. Giri
- Prime Minister: Indira Gandhi
- Preceded by: Adhar Kumar Chatterji
- Succeeded by: Sourendra Nath Kohli

Personal details
- Born: 10 October 1915 Manora, Karachi, British India
- Died: 11 May 2009 (aged 93) New Delhi, India
- Occupation: Chairman and Managing Director Shipping Corporation of India; Member of the Board of Directors, Crown Corporation
- Awards: Padma Vibhushan; Param Vishisht Seva Medal; Ati Vishisht Seva Medal

Military service
- Allegiance: British India (1941–1947); India (1947–1973)
- Branch/service: Royal Indian Navy (1941–1947); Indian Navy (1947–1973)
- Years of service: 1941–1973
- Rank: Admiral
- Commands: Chief of the Naval Staff; Western Naval Command; Indian Fleet; INS Mysore (C60); 12th Frigate Squadron; INS Jamuna (U21); INS Ranjit (1949)
- Battles/wars: World War II; Annexation of Goa; Indo-Pakistani War of 1965; Indo-Pakistani War of 1971

Admiral Sardarilal Mathradas Nanda, PVSM, AVSM (10 October 1915 – 11 May 2009) was an Indian Navy admiral who served as the 6th Chief of the Naval Staff from 1 March 1970 until 28 February 1973. He led the Indian Navy during the Indo-Pakistani War of 1971 and successfully executed a naval blockade of both West and East Pakistan, helping India achieve an overwhelming victory during the war. For the important role he played in the war, the Government of India awarded him the Padma Vibhushan, India's second-highest civilian award. Nanda is recognised as one of the most notable commanders in the history of the Indian Navy.

Born in Manora, Karachi, in the Sind Province of British India, Nanda joined the Royal Indian Naval Volunteer Reserve in 1941. During World War II, he served onboard HMIS Travancore and as an instructor at the signals school in HMIS Talwar. After the war, he served on board HMIS Narbada (U40) which was based out of Japan as part of the British occupation forces. He subsequently served as the communication officer of HMIS Cauvery (U10).

Following the Independence of India, he was appointed executive officer of Cauvery, and in 1948, was appointed first lieutenant of the flagship HMIS Delhi (C74). In 1949, he was appointed director of personnel services at NHQ and in 1950 took command of the R-class destroyer INS Ranjit (1949), which represented India at the coronation review of the fleet. Nanda subsequently commanded the Black Swan-class sloop INS Jamuna (U21) and the 16th frigate squadron. In 1954, he was appointed Chief of Personnel and constituted commodore 2nd class in September 1956. Appointed the commissioning commanding officer of the new flagship of the Navy, the Crown Colony-class cruiser INS Mysore (C60), he commissioned the ship in August 1957 at Birkenhead. In 1958, he took over as the Director General Naval Dockyard Expansion Scheme. After attending the Imperial Defence College in 1962, he returned to India and was appointed Chief of Materiel at NHQ.

Promoted to flag rank in May 1962, Nanda was appointed the Deputy Chief of the Naval Staff. As DCNS, he played an important role in the development of Goa as a naval base. In 1964, he took over as the managing director of Mazagon Dock Limited. In 1966, he was appointed Flag Officer Commanding Indian Fleet and then Flag Officer Bombay in 1968. The Bombay command was upgraded and Nanda took over as the first Flag Officer Commanding-in-Chief Western Naval Command in the rank of vice admiral. On 1 March 1970, he took command as the seventh Chief of the Naval Staff. Under his command, the Navy attacked Karachi with missile boats and bombarded ports in East Pakistan with aircraft of INS Vikrant, apart from successfully enforcing naval blockades on two fronts. He was awarded the Padma Vibhushan, the second-highest civilian award, and awards for distinguished service – the Param Vishisht Seva Medal and the Ati Vishisht Seva Medal.

== Early life and education ==
Nanda was born on 10 October 1915 to Mathra Das, an office superintendent at the workshop of the Port Trust in Manora, Karachi and Pooran Devi. His parents were from villages near Gujranwala in the Punjab Province. He was born in a Punjabi Hindu Khatri family. He was raised on Manora Island at the entrance to the Port of Karachi. He was the eldest of seven children – three boys and four girls. He attended a primary school on the island and then the N J High School in Karachi. He worked for the Port and Pilotage department at Manora after finishing his schooling.

After the outbreak of World War II, he applied for a commission in the Royal Indian Naval Volunteer Reserve (RINVR). He appeared before a selection board in Bombay in September 1941. Successful in the written test and the interview, he was commissioned in the RINVR on 11 October 1941 as an acting sub-lieutenant in the Executive Branch.

== Naval career ==
=== Early career ===
Nanda started his career with a training course for six months on the Deepawati. He was then sent to Calcutta for his next assignment. At Calcutta, he was asked to go to Khulna and take command of a river steamer and patrol the Sundarbans. In June 1942, he was selected for a specialist communications course at HMIS Talwar, the Signals School in Colaba, Bombay. After the course, he served as the signals officer on board the minesweeper HMIS Travancore. In October 1942, he was promoted to the acting rank of lieutenant and appointed an instructor at the Signals School. After the end of the war, he stayed in the Navy despite rapid, large-scale demobilisation. He appeared before a selection board in Lonavala on 31 October 1945.

Nanda was serving at the Signals School at HMIS Talwar when the Royal Indian Navy mutiny broke out in February 1946. The mutiny first started at HMIS Talwar and spread to ships and other shore establishments. The mutiny was called off after the sailors met with Sardar Vallabhbhai Patel. He was asked by the sailors to accompany them, which he did.

In June 1946, he was posted to the sloop HMIS Narbada (U40), which was to sail for Japan from Madras. The ship was based out of Kure, Hiroshima, as part of the British occupation forces and was later transferred to Sasebo, Nagasaki, as part of the US occupation forces. On 19 October 1946 he was granted a permanent commission in the Royal Indian Navy (RIN) as a Lieutenant with backdated seniority of 10 October 1940. In January 1947, he was appointed communications officer of the sloop HMIS Cauvery (U10), then deployed at Karachi.

=== Post-Independence ===
After the partition of India, the Cauvery was assigned to India and she set sail for Bombay. The British officers embarked for England and Nanda was appointed executive officer of the ship. HMIS Kistna (U46) and Cauvery commanded by Commander Ram Dass Katari and Commander Reggie Sawhney respectively made two trips to the United Kingdom. This was because the cruiser HMS Achilles (70) was being purchased by India and renamed HMIS Delhi and the crew was to be transported. In 1948, he was promoted to the acting rank of lieutenant commander and appointed first lieutenant of HMIS Delhi (C74) under the command of Captain H.N.S. Brown, with Commander Ram Dass Katari as his executive officer. To train for this appointment, he was ordered to join the Mediterranean Fleet. He served on board the aircraft carrier HMS Triumph (R16) and subsequently on the cruiser HMS Newcastle (C76).

HMIS Delhi was commissioned on 5 July 1948 by the High Commissioner of India to the United Kingdom V. K. Krishna Menon. On her way to India, she called at Portsmouth, Portland, Gibraltar and Malta. The Prime Minister of India Jawaharlal Nehru himself welcomed the ship at Bombay. She went on a cruise round the coasts of India, calling at Karwar, Cochin, Trincomalee, Madras, Vizag, Calcutta, Port Blair, Colombo and Calicut before returning to Bombay. In May 1949, she left on her Indian Ocean cruise. She called at Victoria, Seychelles, Port Louis in Mauritius, Dar es Salaam in Tanzania and Mombasa in Kenya. The cruise to the Indian Ocean republics and East Africa generated a tremendous amount of goodwill.

On 30 June 1949, at the end of the goodwill mission, Nanda was promoted substantive lieutenant-commander and to the acting rank of Commander. He was appointed director of personnel services (DPS) at Naval headquarters. Nanda was promoted to substantive commander on 31 December 1950. He served as the DPS for about two years. On 10 October 1951, he took command of the R-class destroyer, INS Ranjit (1949). The Ranjit was part of the 11th Destroyer Squadron commanded by Captain Ram Dass Katari. The other two ships in the squadron were INS Rajput (D141) and INS Rana (1942). Nanda took the ship on a goodwill cruise to Singapore, Saigon, Jakarta and other ports in Indonesia like Bali. In Jakarta, he called on and was received by the first President of Indonesia, Sukarno.

In early 1952, Princess Elizabeth and Prince Philip, Duke of Edinburgh set out for a tour of Australia and New Zealand by way of Kenya. The Rajput and the Ranjit were nominated to escort the HMY Britannia from Mombasa to Australia. With the death of King George VI, this was cancelled. To commemorate the Coronation of Elizabeth II, a massive Coronation review of the fleet was held at Portsmouth. The flagship INS Delhi, commanded by Captain Adhar Kumar Chatterji, destroyer INS Ranjit, commanded by Nanda, and the frigate INS Tir (K256), commanded by Commander Nilakanta Krishnan, represented India at the review. A naval armada consisting of ships from the Indian Navy, Royal Navy, Royal Australian Navy and the Royal New Zealand Navy sailed from Portsmouth to Gibraltar. The fleet carried out exercises along the way and was under the command of Lord Mountbatten. The Ranjit under Nanda acquitted itself well during these exercises. Subsequently, the Indian ships continued conducting exercises with the Mediterranean Fleet. They sailed from Gibraltar to Malta, the Greek islands and to Istanbul.

Nanda took command of INS Jamuna (U21) on 31 August 1953 after returning to Bombay. He was also appointed Captain (F) 12th Frigate Squadron. On 15 February 1954, he was promoted to the acting rank of captain and appointed CAPBRAX (captain naval barracks) and commanding officer of INS Angre. After a short stint, he was transferred back to Naval Headquarters as Chief of Personnel (COP) in September 1954. He was promoted to substantive captain on 31 December 1954. He served as the COP for about two and a half years. In September 1956, he was promoted to commodore 2nd Class.

In December 1956, he was appointed the commissioning commanding officer of INS Mysore (C60). The Crown Colony-class cruiser HMS Nigeria (60) was being refitted and modernised in Birkenhead, Liverpool, to be commissioned as the Mysore. He spent a few months in UK preparing his crew. INS Mysore was commissioned on 29 August 1957 by the High Commissioner of India to the United Kingdom Vijaya Lakshmi Pandit. Nanda took the ship to the Mediterranean and subsequently paid an official visit to the port of Split in Socialist Federal Republic of Yugoslavia. He called on President Josip Broz Tito at his home in the Brioni Islands. Returning to India, Nanda and the Mysore were welcomed by the entire Indian Fleet, commanded by the first Indian Fleet Commander Rear Admiral Ram Dass Katari. Katari's flag was transferred from INS Delhi to INS Mysore, thus becoming the new flagship of the Indian Fleet. The Prime Minister Jawaharlal Nehru visited the ship at Bombay and hosted a dinner on board with the Governor of Maharashtra Ali Yavar Jung, the Minister of Defence V. K. Krishna Menon, Chief Minister of Maharashtra Vasantrao Naik being present. After visiting the ports in India, Nanda took the ship to a goodwill visit to China and Japan in the summer of 1958. She called at Singapore, Hong Kong, Shanghai and Yokohama. On the return passage, she called at Haiphong. Before leaving India for the goodwill visit, Nanda had been selected to attend the Imperial Defence College (IDC) and was to embark for the UK after completing the visit. Instead he was informed after departing from Haiphong that his deputation to IDC stood cancelled.

Personally selected by the Defence Minister V K Krishna Menon, Nanda took over as the Director General Naval Dockyard Expansion Scheme (DG-NDES) on 1 October 1958. He undertook a major expansion of the dockyard. He extended the dimensions of the cruiser dock to accommodate the aircraft carrier HMS Hercules (R49) being acquired from the UK. This resulted in tremendous advantage for the Indian Navy. For distinguished service during his tenure as DG-NDES, Nanda was awarded the Ati Vishisht Seva Medal in 1961. In June 1960, he was appointed Officer on Special Duty (OSD) at Naval HQ. Nanda was selected to attend the Imperial Defence College and embarked for the UK in early 1961. After completing the year-long course, he returned to India and was appointed Chief of Materiel (COM) in February 1962.

=== Flag rank ===
In May 1962, Nanda was promoted to the acting rank of rear admiral and appointed Deputy Chief of Naval Staff. As DCNS, he was instrumental in obtaining permission and clearance from the Government of India (GOI) for the naval development of the port at Goa, which was recently annexed. Given the difficulty India had in negotiating the purchase of INS Vikrant from the UK, Nanda supported the acquisition of equipment from the Soviet Union. Promoted to substantive rear-admiral on 16 June 1964, Nanda was appointed managing director of Mazagon Dock Limited in December 1964. He undertook preparations for the construction of Nilgiri-class frigates, the first major naval vessels to be constructed in India. After a 18-month tenure, he handed over charge to Rear Admiral Benjamin Abraham Samson in May 1966. Shortly afterwards, in October, the keel of the first frigate INS Nilgiri (F33) was laid. For his distinguished service as MD of Mazagon Dock, he was awarded the Param Vishisht Seva Medal in January 1966.

On 1 June 1966, Nanda took command of the Indian Fleet as the Flag Officer Commanding Indian Fleet at Bombay. Flying his flag, the fleet visited the Persian Gulf in April 1967. The INS Vikrant visited Bahrain and Kuwait, while her escorts INS Trishul (F143) and INS Talwar (F140) visited Abadan and Basra. The fleet tanker INS Deepak joined the fleet under Nanda.

Nanda took over as Flag Officer Bombay (FOB) on 1 February 1968. In March 1968, the reorganisation of the Navy took place. Posts were upgraded and created at the Naval HQ as well as the naval commands. Nanda was promoted to the rank of vice admiral and became the first Flag Officer Commanding-in-Chief (FOC-in-C) Western Naval Command. Nanda organised the Navy Week in December 1969 which culminated with the review of the Indian Naval Fleet by President V. V. Giri. A successful event, it raised the navy's profile in Bombay. The Navy Week involved the businessmen, industrialists, Bollywood stars and the society at large. Funds were raised and a Sailors' home and an Officers' Mess was also built.

=== Chief of Naval Staff ===
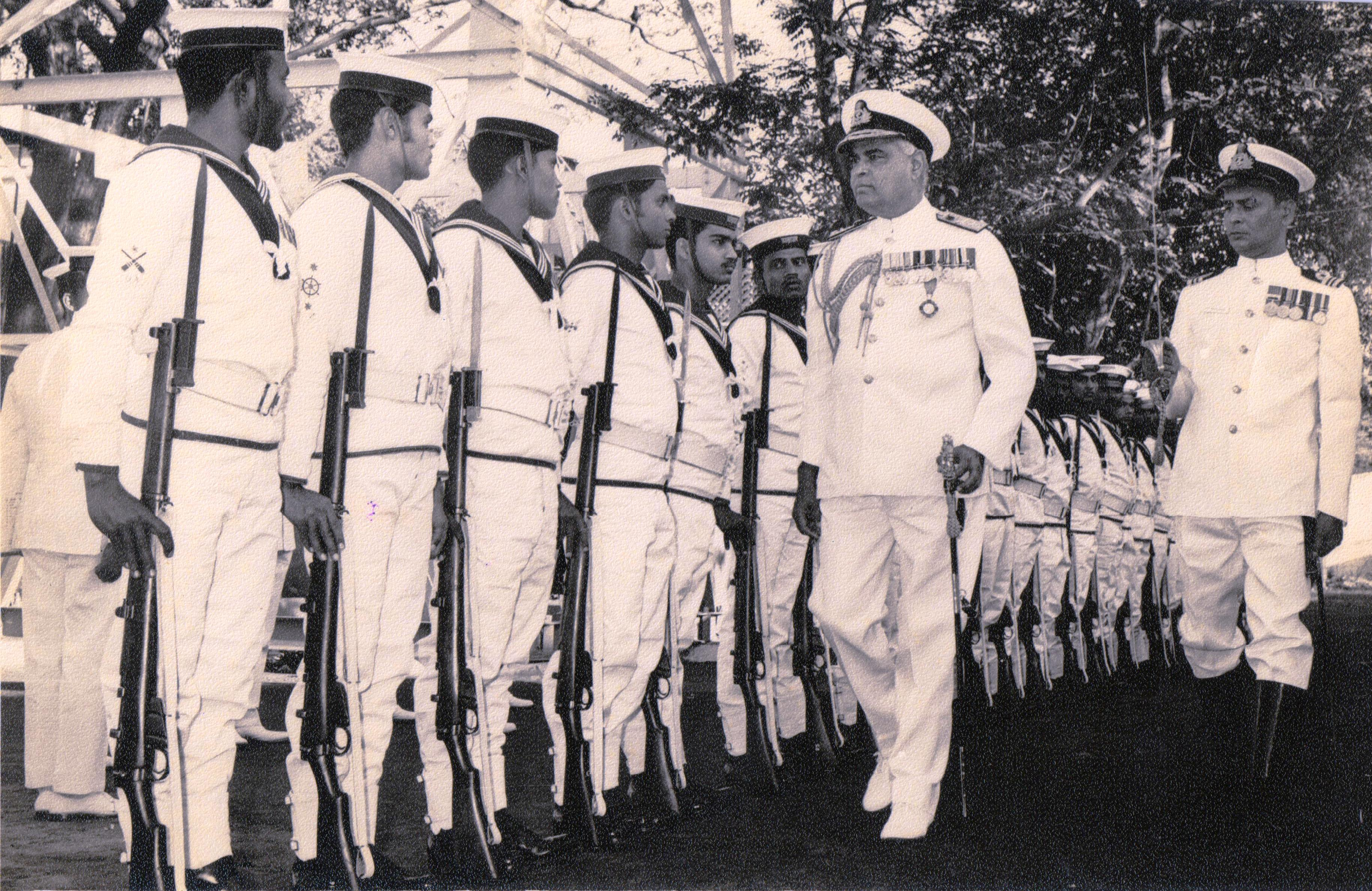
Admiral Nanda reviewing an honour guard at INS Adyar in 1972.

In November 1969, the GOI decided to appoint Nanda as the next CNS in succession to Admiral Adhar Kumar Chatterji. On 1 March 1970, Nanda took command as the 7th Chief of the Naval Staff of the Indian Navy. The 1962 Sino-Indian War was largely fought over the Himalayas and the Navy did not have a major role. During the Indo-Pakistani War of 1965, the Navy was ordered to stay within Indian waters. When the Pakistan Navy bombarded Dwarka, Nanda recognised the need to raise the Navy's profile and capabilities. He was determined to change the mindset of the service from defence to attack. He got the opportunity to demonstrate this capability the following year during the war with Pakistan.

==== Indo-Pakistani War of 1971 ====
The Indo-Pakistani War of 1971 was sparked by the Bangladesh Liberation war, a conflict between the traditionally dominant West Pakistanis and the majority East Pakistanis. In 1970, East Pakistanis demanded autonomy for the state, but the Pakistani government failed to satisfy these demands and, in early 1971, a demand for secession took root in East Pakistan. In March, the Pakistan Armed Forces launched a fierce campaign to curb the secessionists, the latter including soldiers and police from East Pakistan. Thousands of East Pakistanis died, and nearly ten million refugees fled to West Bengal, an adjacent Indian state. In April, India decided to assist in the formation of the new nation of Bangladesh.

Nanda was instrumental in framing India's Naval strategy during the war. He feigned a defensive deployment southeast towards the Andaman Islands, instead moving his Eastern fleet northwards into the Bay of Bengal and enforcing a naval blockade against East Pakistan.

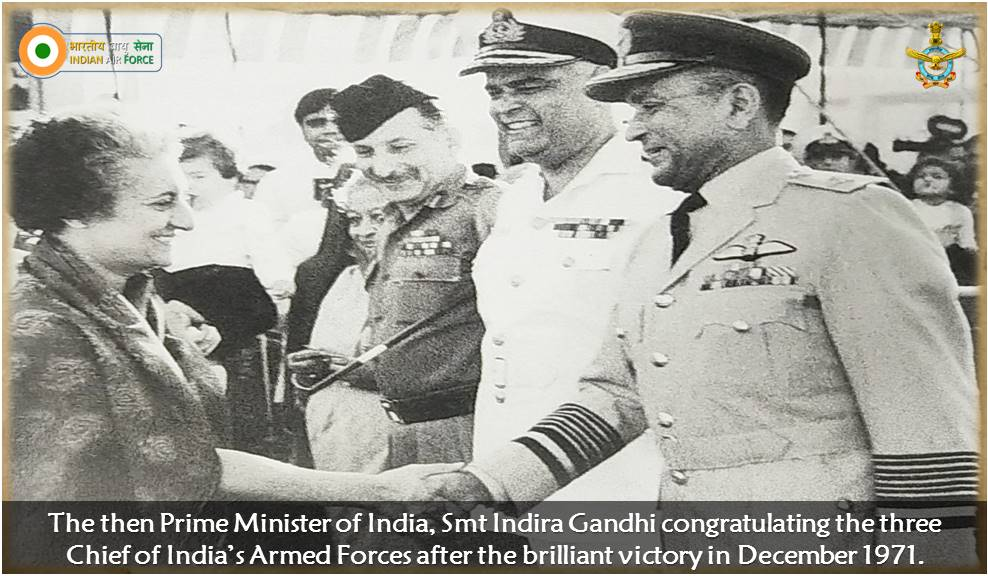
Prime Minister of India, Indira Gandhi congratulating the Chiefs of the three services, General Sam Manekshaw, Admiral SM Nanda and Air Chief Marshal PC Lal.

His strategy against West Pakistan was to strike hard against Pakistan's main port of Karachi. He is recognized as the mastermind behind Operation Trident and Operation Python. The plan for the operations included towing the limited-range Vidyut-class missile boats, primarily designed for coastal defence, to about 250 nautical miles (460 km) south of Karachi during the day, out of range of the Pakistan Air Force aircraft. The missile boats then closed in on Karachi port at night and attacked naval targets as well as the oil tank farm at Keamari. Operation Trident was successfully executed on 4 December 1971, sinking the Pakistan Navy destroyer PNS Khaibar, minesweeper PNS Muhafiz, an ammunition-carrying ship MV Venus Challenger and irreparably damaging another destroyer PNS Shah Jahan as well as destroying numerous oil storage tanks. Operation Python was again successfully carried out on 8 December 1971.

On the Eastern front, Nanda made the decision to deploy the aircraft carrier INS Vikrant into the shallower waters of the Gulf of Bengal off Dhaka, to prevent the risk of a submarine attack. When concerns were raised about Vikrant's boilers being cracked, he took personal responsibility for the risk of a boiler explosion and catapult failure on the carrier. His gambit paid off, as Vikrant was able to successfully enforce the blockade of East Pakistan without any such damage to the carrier.

The war lasted less than a fortnight and saw more than 90,000 Pakistani soldiers taken prisoner. It ended with the unconditional surrender of Pakistan's eastern half and resulted in the birth of Bangladesh as a new nation. In addition to the POWs, Pakistan suffered 6,000 casualties against India's 2,000. The success of the naval blockades on two fronts is considered one of the primary factors in India's overwhelming victory during the war. For his services to the nation, he was awarded the Padma Vibhushan in January 1972. The citation for the Padma Vibhushan reads as follows:

CITATION
Admiral Sardarilal Mathradas Nanda, PVSM

Admiral Sardarilal Mathradas Nanda, Chief of the Naval Staff, India, since 1" March 1970, has forged the Indian Navy into an efficient striking force and brought it to the pinnacle of its achievement during the recent conflict with Pakistan. Admiral Nanda personally directed the re-organisation of the Indian Navy and guided the training of its officers and men. Under his able direction the Pakistan fleet was contained in its harbours and prevented from hitting at our shupping and at our ports. The Western Fleet mounted two daring attacks, in which ports and shore installations at Karachi were severely damaged and the strength of the Pakistani fleet was seriously crippled. The Pakistani Naval craft in Bangla Desh and the Bay of Bengal were severely mauled. The Pakistani occupation forces were cut off from their sources of supply and their escape routes were effectively sealed. The Eastern Fleet provided close support to the combined operations in Bangla Desh and to the liberation struggle.

Admiral Nanda's strategy made it possible for the Indian Navy to dominate both the Bay of Bengal and the Arabian Sea off the Pakistani coast. Pakistani ports were effectively blocked and a number of ships carrying contraband to Pakistan were intercepted. Our own ports remained open to all merchant shipping and the plans of the Pakistani Navy to interfere with our merchant shipping on high seas were effectively frustrated.

== Post-retirement ==
Nanda retired from the Indian Navy on 30 August 1973. He was appointed Chairman and Managing director (CMD) of the largest shipping company in India, the Shipping Corporation of India (SCI) in May 1974.

== Personal life ==
At the age of 21, Nanda was married to Sumitra Nanda. The marriage was harmonious and lasted all their lives, during which they were fated to suffer many vicissitudes together, ranging from the partition of India which uprooted them from their native land, to the heights of honour when Nanda became chief of the Indian Navy. The couple were the parents of several children, including a son, Suresh Nanda (ex-naval officer and businessman) and Veena Mehra, wife of Major Pradeep Kumar Mehra, an army officer and polo enthusiast who founded and ran Usha Stud Farm on the outskirts of Delhi.

Nanda suffered a personal tragedy on 2 January 2001 when his daughter Veena, her husband and their daughter Radhika were killed in a helicopter crash while flying from Mussoorie to Dehradun Airport after attending a New Year's party. Their other two daughters, Ameeta and Devika, survived since they were not on the helicopter; Ameeta Mehra now runs Usha Stud Farm.

== Controversies ==
Following his retirement, Nanda took an executive role with Crown Corporation, an arms trading firm headed by his son Suresh Nanda, which specialized in supply of imported weapons to the Indian Armed Forces. The organization was surrounded by a controversy when Operation West End a sting-operation which aimed to expose corruption between India's defence ministry and Crown Corporation. The allegation on Admiral Nanda's son, Suresh Nanda, was closed by CBI when no evidence was found.

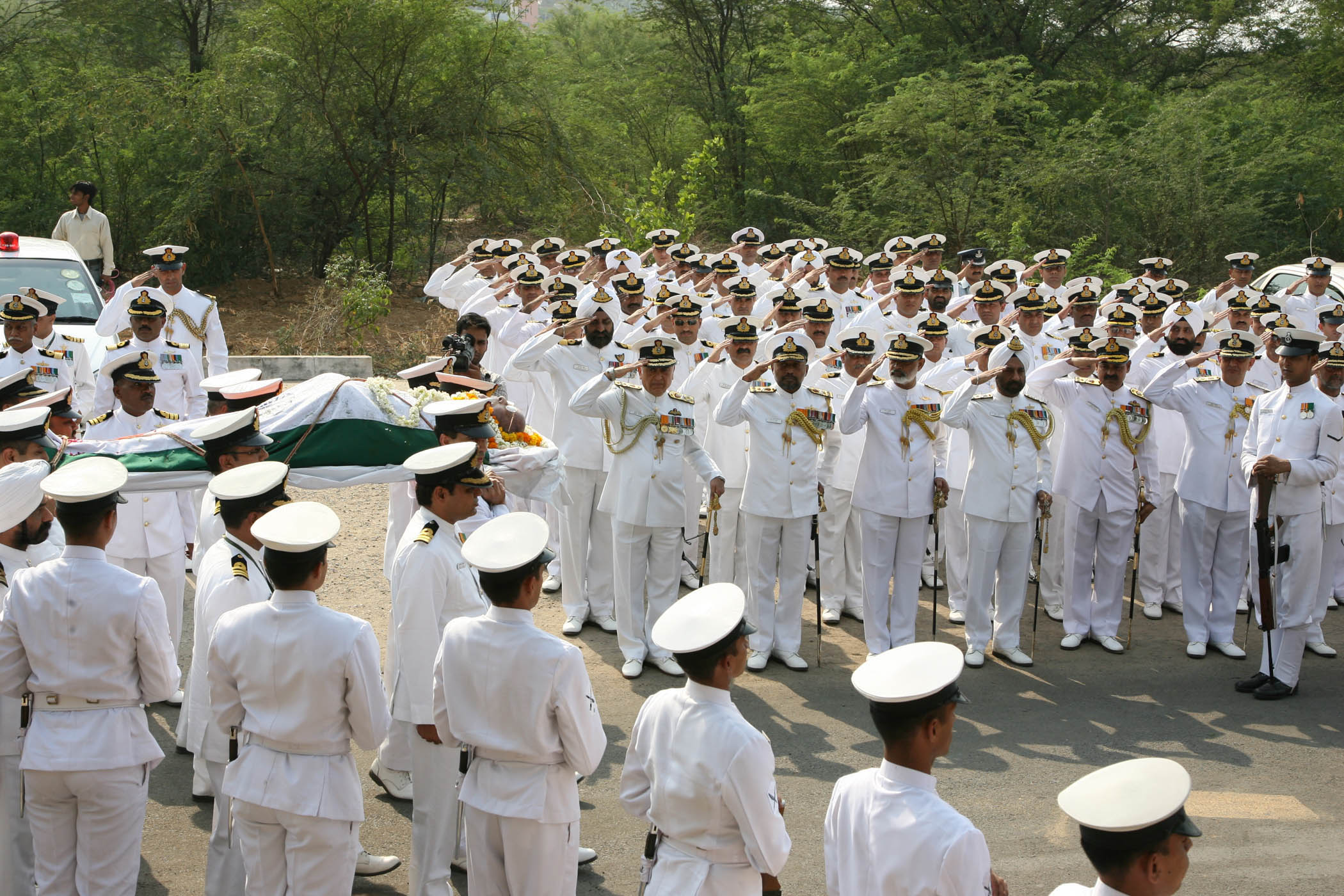
CNS Adm Sureesh Mehta and other Naval Officers paying tribute to Adm Nanda.

Another incident that caused turmoil in the family was the 1999 Delhi hit-and-run case, which involved Admiral Nanda's grandson Sanjeev Nanda. Sanjeev Nanda was found guilty by the Supreme Court of India. The accident and the trial attracted a lot of media attention and became one of the cases that exemplified middle class India's frustration with rich and powerful people being able to circumvent the law.

== Later years and death ==
In the later years of his life, Nanda wrote his autobiography titled The Man Who Bombed Karachi: A Memoir. The book provides an insider's account and the reminisces how India adapted an inventive strategy to defeat Pakistan, and the 32 years of his naval career. Nanda participated in interviews on Indian War Heroes, a popular one being the interview by Sushil Sharma in 1997. His tactics in India's victory is still being discussed by channels on YouTube and Indian websites.

Admiral Nanda died in New Delhi on 11 May 2009 at the age of 93. He was survived by his wife Sumitra Nanda (died Feb 2011), son Suresh Nanda and grandchildren. His funeral was marked with full military honours at Brar Square Crematorium in New Delhi and was attended by top brass of the Armed Forces. The Telegraph however wrote that it was not as well attended as his naval career mandated.

== Awards ==

Padma Vibhushan	Param Vishisht Seva Medal	Ati Vishisht Seva Medal	General Service Medal 1947	Samar Seva Star
Poorvi Star	Paschimi Star	Raksha Medal	Sangram Medal	Indian Independence Medal
25th Independence Anniversary Medal	30 Years Long Service Medal		20 Years Long Service Medal	9 Years Long Service Medal
1939–45 Star	Burma Star		War Medal 1939–1945	India Service Medal
Naval General Service Medal (1915)			Queen Elizabeth II Coronation Medal	

== Dates of rank ==
Insignia	Rank	Component	Date of rank
	Sub-lieutenant	Royal Indian Navy	11 October 1941 (acting)
	Lieutenant	Royal Indian Navy	11 October 1942 (acting); 19 October 1946 (substantive)
	Lieutenant commander	Royal Indian Navy	1948 (acting); 30 June 1949 (substantive)
	Commander	Royal Indian Navy	30 June 1949 (acting)
	Commander	Indian Navy	26 January 1950 (recommissioning and change in insignia); 31 December 1950 (substantive)
	Captain	Indian Navy	15 February 1954 (acting); 31 December 1954
	Commodore	Indian Navy	September 1956 (2nd class); February 1962 (substantive)
	Rear admiral	Indian Navy	14 May 1962 (acting); 16 June 1964 (substantive)
	Vice admiral	Indian Navy	1 March 1968
	Admiral	Indian Navy	1 March 1970

== See also ==
- Field Marshal Sam Manekshaw
- Air Chief Marshal Pratap Chandra Lal

== Bibliography ==
- Nanda, S.M. (2004), The man who bombed Karachi, HarperCollins Publishers India, ISBN 978-8172235628
- Singh, Satyindra (1986), Under two ensigns: The Indian Navy, 1945–1950, Oxford & IBH Pub. Co, ISBN 978-8120400948
- Singh, Satyindra (1991), Blueprint to bluewater: The Indian Navy, 1951–65, Lancer International, ISBN 978-8170621485
- Abidi, S Sartaj Alam; Sharma, Satinder (2007), Services Chiefs of India, Northern Book Centre, ISBN 978-8172111625
- Katari, Ram Dass (1983), A Sailor Remembers, Vikas, ISBN 978-0-7069-2064-2

Military offices
Preceded by Benjamin Abraham Samson	Chief of Personnel; 1954–1956	Succeeded by G. S. Kapoor
New title First holder	Commanding officer INS Mysore; 1956–1958	Succeeded by Sourendra Nath Kohli
Preceded by B N Lele	Chief of Materiel; 1962–1962	Succeeded by C L Bhandari
Preceded by Adhar Kumar Chatterji	Deputy Chief of the Naval Staff; 1962–1964	Succeeded by Sourendra Nath Kohli
Preceded by Benjamin Abraham Samson	Flag Officer Commanding Indian Fleet; 1966–1967	Succeeded by Sourendra Nath Kohli
Preceded by R S David	Flag Officer Bombay; 1967–1968	Office abolished
New title Office created	Flag Officer Commanding-in-Chief Western Naval Command; 1968–1970	Succeeded by Nilakanta Krishnan
Preceded by Adhar Kumar Chatterji	Chief of the Naval Staff; 1970–1973	Succeeded by Sourendra Nath Kohli
Government offices
Preceded by Chandrika Prasad Srivastava	Chairman and Managing Director, Shipping Corporation of India; 1974–1977	Succeeded by Krishan Dev
