= Ajitendu Chakraverti =

Indian navy admiral (1914–1995)

Rear Admiral A Chakraverti
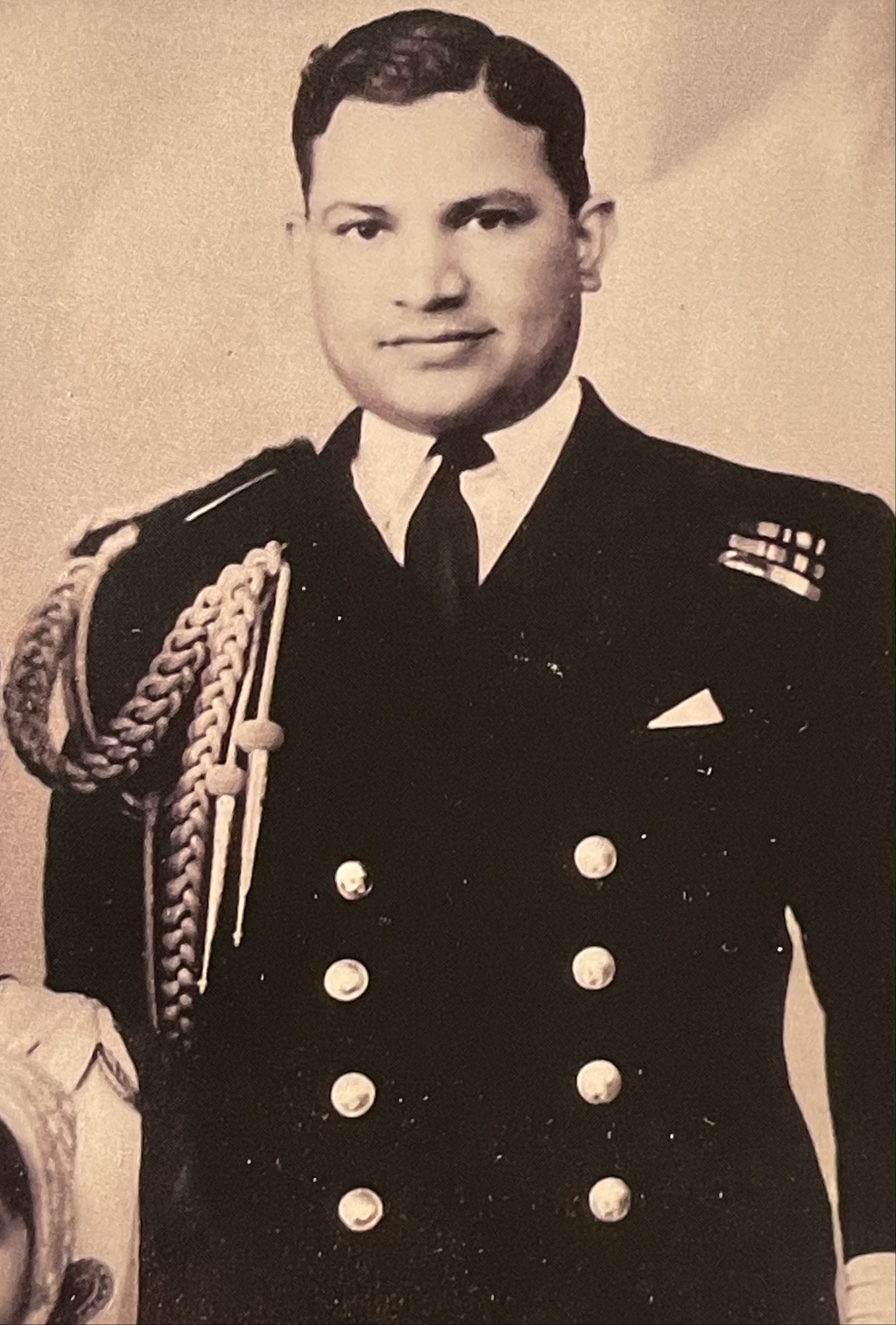
- Born: 3 February 1914; Ajmere, India
- Died: 16 October 1995 (aged 81); Delhi, India
- Military career
- Allegiance: British Raj; India
- Branch: Royal Indian Navy; Indian Navy
- Service years: 1928–1963
- Rank: Rear Admiral
- Nickname: Aton
- Commands: Indian Fleet; Bombay Command; 11th Destroyer Flotilla; INS Rajput (D141); HMIS Himalaya; HMIS Rajputana (J197)
- Conflicts: World War II
- Awards: Mentioned in dispatches

Rear Admiral Ajitendu Chakraverti was a flag officer in the Indian Navy. He served as the second Indian Flag Officer Commanding Indian Fleet, succeeding Rear Admiral Ram Dass Katari. He was the first Indian to be promoted to the high rank of commodore in the Royal Indian Navy.

== Naval career ==
=== Dufferin and early career ===
The Indian Mercantile Marine Training Ship (IMMTS) Dufferin was established in 1927 to train young men for India's marine service. Chakraverti was in the second batch of Indian cadet-entry officers to join the Dufferin in 1928. He completed the course earning the Viceroy's gold medal in 1930. The future chief of the naval staff Bhaskar Sadashiv Soman was his batchmate. They would have a healthy rivalry throughout their careers. In 1930, Chakraverti joined the Royal Indian Marine (RIM) as a cadet. He was trained in the United Kingdom for three years, among which he spent on the lead ship of her class of monitors HMS Erebus (I02) and the heavy cruiser HMS Frobisher (D81). He was appointed a sub-lieutenant in the RIM on 1 September 1934. On 2 October 1934, the RIM was renamed Royal Indian Navy (RIN). He was promoted to the rank of lieutenant in the RIN on 1 September 1937.

=== World War II ===
With the outbreak of World War II in September 1939, Chakraverti underwent a specialist gunnery course in the United Kingdom. He returned to India in March 1941 and was appointed Second-in-command of the RIN Gunnery School in Bombay. He was promoted to the acting rank of lieutenant commander in October 1943 and was appointed Staff Officer Gunnery at Naval Headquarters. On 5 October 1944, he was given command of the Bangor-class minesweeper HMIS Rajputana, and was involved in minesweeping operations off Burma and the Malacca Strait in the far-east.

Chakraverti was promoted substantive lieutenant commander on 18 September 1945. For distinguished services during the war in the Far-East, he was mentioned in dispatches in June 1946. As the senior-most Naval officer, he led the Naval contingent at the London Victory Celebrations of 1946. In 1946, he attended the Royal Naval College, Greenwich. After completing the year-long staff course, he returned to India and was appointed commanding officer of the gunnery school, HMIS Himalaya, in Karachi. In June 1947, he was promoted to the acting rank of captain. He subsequently took over as the Chief of Administration (COA) at Naval HQ.

=== Post-Independence ===
After the partition of India, Chakraverti continued as COA. In March 1948, the chief of staff at Naval HQ, Commodore M. H. St. L. Nott was killed in an air crash. Chakraverti took over as the officiating chief of staff and was promoted to the rank of commodore 2nd class in May. He thus became the first Indian officer to be promoted to a high rank.

In November 1948, Chakraverti handed over charge of chief of staff to Commodore H Drew and embarked for the United Kingdom. India was acquiring three destroyers from the UK – HMS Rotherham (H09), HMS Redoubt (H41) and HMS Raider (H15) which were being renamed to INS Rajput (D141), INS Ranjit (D209) and INS Rana (D115). Chakraverti was appointed commanding officer of the Rajput and the captain of the 11th Destroyer Flotilla. The ships were commissioned with much ceremony in Portsmouth. The flotilla underwent an intensive four-month work-up with the Mediterranean Fleet of the Royal Navy. The flotilla, under, Chakraverti, was adjudged the best and most efficient among all British and Commonwealth destroyer squadrons in the Mediterranean.

In January 1950, the flotilla arrived in Bombay and was inspected by the Commander-in-Chief, Royal Indian Navy Vice Admiral Sir William Edward Parry. The Governor of Bombay Raja Maharaj Singh also inspected the flotilla. Chakraverti was promoted substantive captain on 31 December 1950. In November 1951, he relinquished command, handing over charge to Captain Ram Dass Katari. Chakraverti was subsequently appointed to a key naval post – Captain Superintendent Indian Naval Dockyard at Bombay.

In December 1953, he was appointed the next commodore-in-charge Bombay (COMBAY) in the rank of commodore. He relinquished command of the dockyard, handing over to Captain S. G. Karmarkar in March 1954. He then assumed office of COMBAY from Commodore R M T Taylor, the first Indian Officer to do so. This appointment was later upgraded to rear admiral and re-designated Flag officer Bombay in 1958, and to vice admiral and re-designated Flag Officer Commanding-in-Chief Western Naval Command in 1968. Later that year, he was selected to attend the Imperial Defence College in the UK. He relinquished command to Commodore Adhar Kumar Chatterji in November. After the year-long course, he returned to India and took over as Deputy Chief of the Naval Staff on 10 March 1956 from Commodore Ram Dass Katari, who took charge as the first Indian Fleet Commander.

=== Fleet commander ===
In February 1958, it was announced that Chakraverti was appointed the flag officer commanding Indian Fleet (FOCIF), the second Indian officer to hold the appointment. He was promoted to the acting rank of rear admiral on 8 February and went on a five-week study tour. On 2 April 1958, he assumed the office of FOCIF and was promoted substantive rear admiral, flying his flag on the newly commissioned flagship, the cruiser INS Mysore (C60) (formerly Crown Colony-class cruiser HMS Nigeria (60).

Soon after taking command, he led the Indian fleet in the Joint Commonwealth Exercises off Ceylon. The fleet consisted of the flagship INS Mysore (C60), the light cruiser INS Delhi (C74), destroyers INS Godavari (D92), INS Gomati (D93), INS Ganga (D94), frigates INS Tir (K256), HMIS Kistna (U46) and HMIS Cauvery (U10) with the fleet tanker INS Shakti. The fleet exercised with the Royal Navy, Royal Ceylon Navy and the Pakistan Navy starting off from Trincomalee. In June 1959, Chakraverti led the fleet on a ten-week exercise. The flagship Mysore was escorted by the Kaveri and Kistna. The 14th frigate squadron comprising INS Brahmaputra (1957) and INS Khukri (F149) and the 11th destroyer squadron comprising INS Rajput (D141), INS Ranjit (1949) and INS Rana (D115) also joined them. the ships called on ports on the east coast of India and the Andaman Islands.

In August, the fleet conducted exercises with the Royal Navy off Cochin. Chakraverti conducted these exercises from the air, flying in a Short Sealand aircraft. In March 1960, he led the fleet in the Joint Commonwealth exercises which was the largest till then, with the Royal Navy, Royal Australian Navy, Royal Ceylon Navy, Pakistan Navy, Royal New Zealand Navy and Royal Malaysian Navy participating.

=== Later career and retirement ===
Chakraverti relinquished command of the Indian fleet in April 1960, handing over to Rear Admiral B. S. Soman. In the same month, the National Defence College (NDC) was inaugurated by Prime Minister Jawaharlal Nehru. Chakraverti was selected to be the first naval senior directing staff (SDS) of NDC. He served as the Naval SDS for the first two courses of the college. The other SDS were Air Vice Marshal Ramaswamy Rajaram, the SDS (Air) and B. N. Verma ICS, the SDS (Civ). In April 1962, the Government of India chose B S Soman over Chakraverti as the next Chief of Naval Staff. Chakraverti retired in June 1963.

== See also ==
- Admiral Bhaskar Sadashiv Soman
- Flag Officer Commanding Indian Fleet

== Bibliography ==
- Katari, Ram Dass (1983), A Sailor Remembers, Vikas, ISBN 9780706920642
- Singh, Satyindra (1986), Under two ensigns: The Indian Navy, 1945–1950, Oxford & IBH Pub. Co, ISBN 978-8120400948
- Singh, Satyindra (1991), Blueprint to bluewater: The Indian Navy, 1951–65, Lancer International, ISBN 978-8170621485

Military offices
Preceded by Ram Dass Katari	Flag Officer Commanding Indian Fleet; 1958–1960	Succeeded by Bhaskar Sadashiv Soman
Preceded by Ram Dass Katari	Deputy Chief of the Naval Staff; 1956–1958	Succeeded by Adhar Kumar Chatterji
Preceded by R M T Taylor	Commodore-in-Charge Bombay; 1954–1954	Succeeded by Adhar Kumar Chatterji
Preceded by M. H. St. L. Nott	Chief of Staff to Commander-in-Chief, Royal Indian Navy; 1947–1948	Succeeded by H. Drew
