= Ram Dass Katari =

Indian admiral (1911–1983)

Admiral Ram Dass Katari

5th Indian Ambassador to Burma
- In office 1 June 1964 – 8 February 1969
- President: S. Radhakrishnan; Zakir Husain
- Preceded by: R. S. Mani
- Succeeded by: Baleshwar Prasad

8th Chairman of the Chiefs of Staff Committee
- In office 7 May 1961 – 4 June 1962
- President: Rajendra Prasad; S. Radhakrishnan
- Prime Minister: Jawaharlal Nehru; Gulzarilal Nanda (acting)
- Preceded by: K. S. Thimayya
- Succeeded by: A. M. Engineer

3rd chief of the naval staff
- In office 22 April 1958 – 4 June 1962
- President: Rajendra Prasad; S. Radhakrishnan
- Prime Minister: Jawaharlal Nehru; Gulzarilal Nanda (acting)
- Preceded by: S. H. Carlill
- Succeeded by: B. S. Soman

Personal details
- Born: 8 October 1911 Chingleput, Madras Presidency, British Raj (now in Tamil Nadu, India)
- Died: 21 January 1983 (aged 71) Secunderabad, Andhra Pradesh, India
- Relations: Admiral Laxminarayan Ramdas (Son-in-law)

Military service
- Allegiance: British India; India
- Branch/service: Royal Indian Navy; Indian Navy
- Years of service: 1927–1962
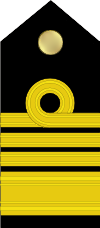
- Rank: Admiral
- Commands: Indian Fleet; INS Rajput (D141); HMIS Kistna (U46); HMIS Cauvery (U10)
- Battles/wars: World War II; Liberation of Goa
- Later work(s): Chairman, APSRTC; Author, A Sailor Remembers

Admiral Ram Dass Katari (8 October 1911 – 21 January 1983) was an Indian Navy Admiral who served as the 3rd chief of the naval staff (CNS) from 22 April 1958 to 4 June 1962. He was the first Indian to hold the office and succeeded the last British officer to the post, Vice Admiral Sir Stephen Hope Carlill.

A member of the first batch of cadets to attend the Indian Mercantile Marine Training Ship Dufferin, he earned the Viceroy's gold medal and joined the Hooghly River Survey of the Calcutta Port Commissioners. In 1939, he joined the Royal Indian Naval Reserve and served on board the HMIS Sandoway. He then served at the gunnery school HMIS Dalhousie, the boys' training school HMIS Bahadur and was an instructor at HMIS Machlimar. At the end of the war, he commanded HMIS Cauvery (U10).

After the Independence of India, he commanded HMIS Kistna (U46) and the naval force during the Indian integration of Junagadh. In 1948, he served as the executive officer of the flagship HMIS Delhi (C74). Promoted to acting captain in December 1948, he was appointed chief of personnel at NHQ. In 1951, he took command of the INS Rajput (D141) and the 11th Destroyer Flotilla. After attending the Imperial Defence College in 1953, he returned to India and was appointed deputy commander-in-chief.

In 1956, he was promoted to flag rank and appointed Flag Officer (Flotillas) Indian Fleet. After commanding the Indian fleet for two years, he was appointed chief of the naval staff. He served a full term as chief,and his tenure saw the commissioning of India's first aircraft carrier,INS Vikrant,and the liberation of Goa. After his retirement, he served as the chairman of Andhra Pradesh State Road Transport Corporation (APSRTC). From 1964 to 1969, he was India's ambassador to Burma.

He had many firsts to his credit: the first Indian naval officer to attend the Imperial Defence College, in 1953; the first Indian to be promoted to flag rank in the navy, in 1956; the first Indian to command the Indian fleet, in 1956; and finally, the first to Indian to command the Navy itself, in 1958.

== Early life ==
Katari was born in Chingleput in Madras Presidency on 8 October 1911. His father was an Assistant Civil Engineer employed with the Government of Madras Presidency. He spent most of his childhood and youth in Hyderabad. He was educated at Mahbub College High School and at Nizam College in Hyderabad.

== Naval career ==
=== Dufferin and the mercantile marine ===
After graduation, Katari was in the first batch of Indian cadet-entry officers to join the Indian Mercantile Marine Training Ship Dufferin on its establishment in 1927. He topped the entrance examination. In the same batch was S. G. Karmarkar, who also joined the Indian Navy and rose to the rank of rear admiral. Katari finished the course earning the Viceroy's gold medal. Later, he was the first graduate of TS Dufferin to serve on its Governing Board. He was selected by the Calcutta Port Commissioners to join the Hooghly River Survey. The river survey kept track of the shifting river bed of the Hooghly river. Working on survey ships owned by the port commissioners, he rose to head surveys independently.

=== World War II ===
In mid-1939, with the outbreak of the World War II, he applied for a commission in the Royal Indian Navy Reserve (RINR). On 23 September 1939, Katari received a temporary commission as a probationary sub lieutenant in the RINR. He was assigned to the auxiliary patrol vessel HMIS Sandoway as its most junior officer on 11 May 1940. Promoted to temporary lieutenant on 23 September 1940, he was subsequently assigned to HMIS Dalhousie, the naval gunnery school in Bombay. On 9 April 1943, he was posted to Karachi and assigned to HMIS Bahadur, the Boys' Training Establishment for the RIN.

Katari served in surface fleets of the Atlantic and Indian Oceans. He specialized in anti-submarine warfare. Later, he also served as an instructor at the Anti-Submarine Warfare School HMIS Machlimar in Mumbai. He was promoted to acting lieutenant-commander on 30 September 1944. At the end of the war, as a lieutenant-commander, he was appointed the commanding officer of HMIS Cauvery (U10) and led the mine clearance operations in the Andaman & Nicobar Islands. In early 1946, the 56th Services Selection Board was set up at Lonavala to screen the RINR and Royal Indian Naval Volunteer Reserve (RINVR) officers for a permanent commission in the RIN. Katari was appointed senior group staff officer and later deputy president of the board. Later that year, Katari was appointed commander of the 37th minesweeping flotilla, which performed minesweeping operations in the Strait of Malacca and the Andaman and Nicobar Islands.

=== Post-Independence ===
Upon the Independence of India, Katari held the rank of commander and was the commanding officer of HMIS Kistna (U46). He led the defence operations off the Kathiawar coast during the integration of Junagadh. The Naval force consisted of three sloops – HMIS Kistna (U46), HMIS Cauvery (U10) and HMIS Jumna (U21), two fleet minesweepers – HMIS Konkan (J228) and HMIS Madras (J237), the Motor Launch ML 420 and a tank landing craft.

In 1948, the cruiser INS Delhi (C74) was purchased from the United Kingdom. She was commissioned on 5 July 1948, with Captain H.N.S. Brown as the commanding officer and became the flagship of the Indian Navy. From July 1948 to early 1949, Katari served as the commander (executive officer) of the cruiser, with Lt S M Nanda as his first lieutenant. On 31 December 1948, Katari was promoted to acting captain. In February 1949, the Naval Headquarters (NHQ) was re-organised and he was appointed the chief of personnel, taking over the post on 9 March. On 31 December 1949, he was promoted to the substantive rank of captain.

In November 1951, Katari was appointed captain (D) 11th Destroyer Flotilla as well as the commanding officer of the lead destroyer of the squadron, INS Rajput (D141). Apart from the Rajput, the flotilla consisted of INS Ranjit (1949) and INS Rana (1942). He succeeded Captain Ajitendu Chakraverti to the post. In September 1952, Katari was selected to attend the Imperial Defence College and in early 1953, proceeded to United Kingdom. He was the first Indian naval officer to be selected for the course. He attended the course with Air Vice Marshal (later Air Marshal and CAS) Subroto Mukerjee, the senior-most Indian Air Force officer. After the year-long course, he returned to India in early 1954 and was appointed the deputy commander-in-chief in the rank of commodore, assuming the post and rank on 18 March 1954. During this stint, Katari officiated as the commander-in-chief in the acting rank of rear admiral and sat in on the meetings of the Chiefs of Staff Committee.

=== Fleet commander ===
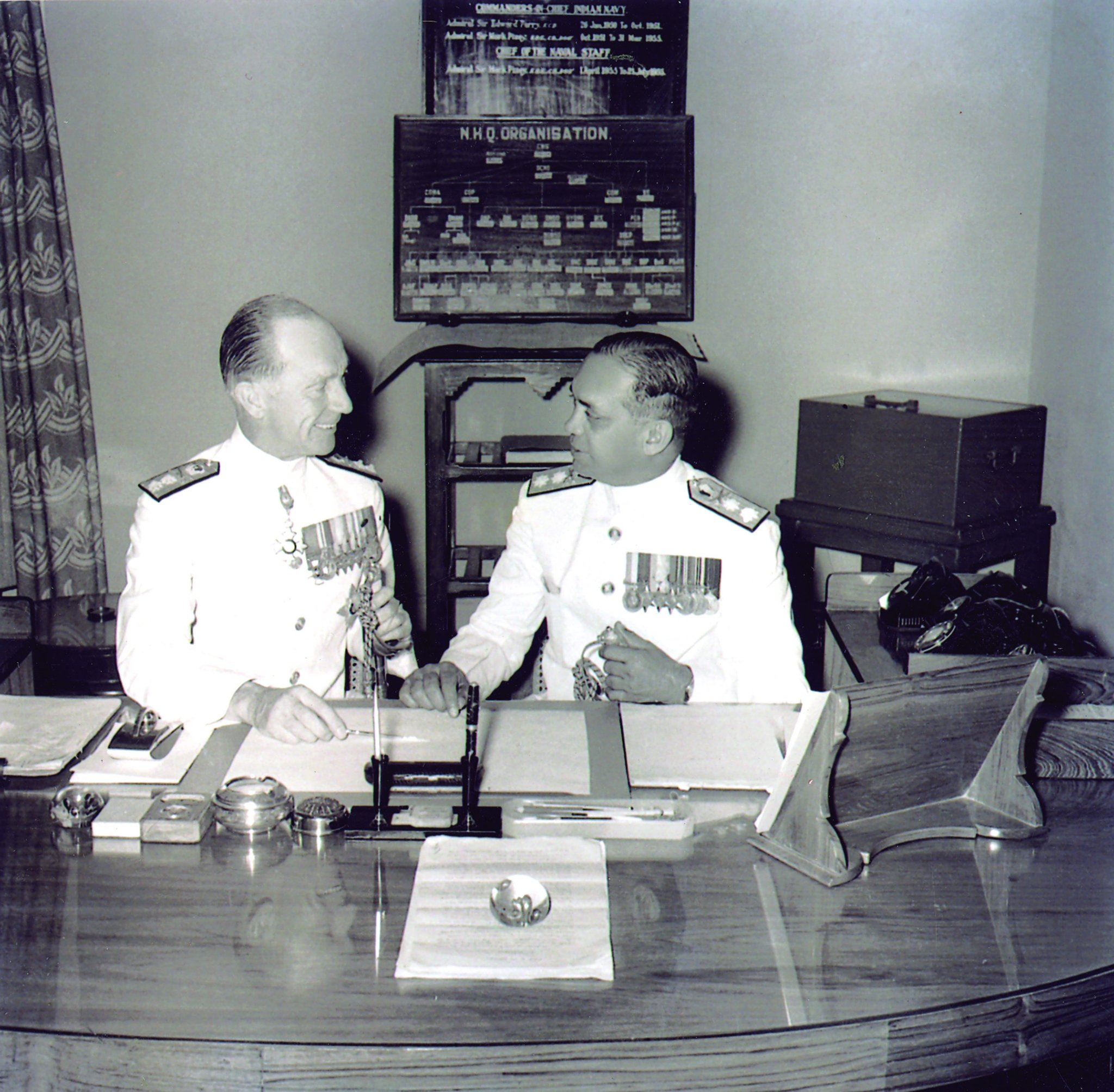
Adm R D Katari (right) taking command of the Navy from Adm S H Carlill on 22 April 1958 at NHQ.

In December 1955, the Government of India announced the appointment of Katari as the Flag Officer (Flotillas) Indian Fleet. He would be the first Indian Officer to command the fleet and take over in September 1956 from Rear Admiral St John Tyrwhitt KCB, DSO, DSC & Bar. He was promoted to the acting rank of rear admiral on 12 March 1956. Before taking up the appointment, Katari embarked to the United Kingdom and Europe on a study tour. He visited Naval establishments, schools, shipyards and defence equipment production units. He visited HMS Nigeria (60) (later INS Mysore (C60)) which was being purchased by the Indian Navy. He also visited shipyards and factories in Cologne, Düsseldorf, Hamburg, Stuttgart, Munich and Lübeck.

On 2 October 1956, he was confirmed as a substantive rear admiral and became the first Indian officer to be appointed the flag officer (flotillas) Indian Fleet. The transfer of command ceremony took place on board the flagship INS Delhi, berthed in the Naval Dockyard, Mumbai. His flag was hoisted on the INS Delhi at 8 a.m. It was on Katari's request that the transfer of command was fixed on 2 October, to coincide with Gandhi Jayanti. In August 1957, INS Mysore was commissioned and Katari's flag was transferred from INS Delhi to INS Mysore, the new flagship of the Indian Fleet.

=== Chief of naval staff ===
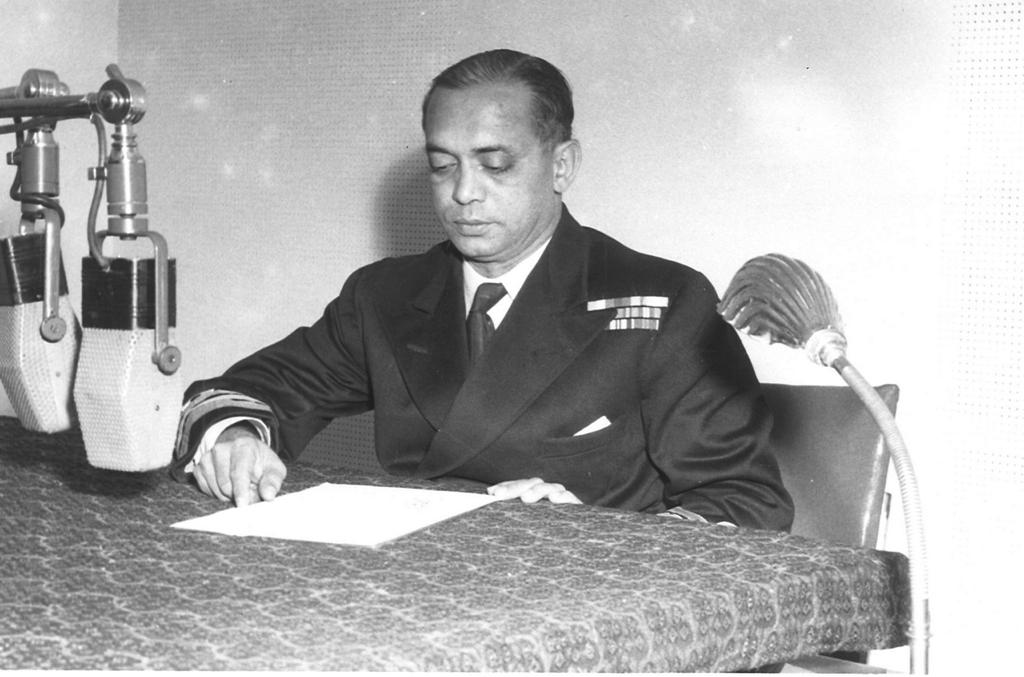
Katari as Chief of Naval Staff.

In February 1958, Katari was appointed the first Indian chief of the naval staff (CNS). On 22 April 1958, he was promoted to the rank of vice admiral and took command of the Indian Navy. His flag was hoisted on INS India.

As CNS, he designed the framework for India's strategy for managing maritime security issues. During his tenure, the Indian Navy underwent a consolidation of its acquisitions, and established plans for its future growth. It also instituted improvements to training and operational effectiveness programs. India's first aircraft-carrier, INS Vikrant, was commissioned during his tenure. As CNS, he led the naval operations during the liberation of Goa from Portuguese rule in December 1961.

He retired as CNS on 4 June 1962. He relinquished the post of CNS as a vice admiral, then the highest rank in the Indian Navy.

== Later life ==
Katari served as the chairman of Andhra Pradesh State Road Transport Corporation (APSRTC) between December 1962 and May 1964. In 1964 he was appointed India's ambassador to Burma, where he served for over five years. He was the first setter of The Hindu Crossword and compiled the daily puzzles until his death. He also authored a memoir of the formative years of the Indian Navy during his service, A Sailor Remembers.

In 1968, the post of CNS was upgraded to the rank of full admiral, and on 21 October 1980, Katari and Bhaskar Sadashiv Soman, his successor as CNS, were promoted to the honorary rank of full admiral on the retired list by President Neelam Sanjiva Reddy.

== Personal life ==
Katari married Dhanam Katari (née Chalam). They had two children – a daughter Lalita, and a son, Ravi. Lalita married his flag lieutenant Laxminarayan Ramdas. Ramdas later went on to become the 13th Chief of Naval Staff.

== Death and legacy ==
Katari died at Secunderabad on 21 January 1983, aged 71. The Katari Memorial Hall at A/21, Sainikpuri, near Secunderabad, was dedicated to the memory of Admiral Katari on the event of his birth centenary on 8 October 2011. The Admiral R D Katari Marg in Sainikpuri, Secunderabad where the College of Defence Management is located, is named after him, as is Katari Bagh in Willingdon Island in Kochi. The cadet's dining hall at the Indian Naval Academy is named after Katari. The Admiral RD Katari Trophy is awarded to the sub lieutenant placing first in overall merit during the ab-initio training. The Navy Foundation organises the ADM RD KATARI MEMORIAL LECTURE every year.

== See also ==
- Field Marshal K. M. Cariappa
- Air Marshal Subroto Mukerjee

Military offices
Preceded by Bhaskar Sadashiv Soman	Chief of Personnel; 1949–1951	Succeeded by Benjamin Abraham Samson
Preceded by G A French	Deputy Commander-in-Chief; 1954–1955	Office abolished
New title Office created	Deputy Chief of the Naval Staff; 1955–1956	Succeeded by Ajitendu Chakraverti
Preceded by St John Tyrwhitt	Flag Officer Commanding Indian Fleet; 1956–1958	Succeeded by Ajitendu Chakraverti
Preceded by Stephen Hope Carlill	Chief of the Naval Staff; 1958–1962	Succeeded by Bhaskar Sadashiv Soman
Preceded by General K S Thimayya	Chairman of the Chiefs of Staff Committee; 1961–1962	Succeeded by Air Marshal Aspy Engineer
Diplomatic posts
Preceded by R S Mani	Ambassador of India to Burma; 1964–1969	Succeeded by Baleshwar Prasad
