= Adhar Kumar Chatterji =

Indian naval officer

Admiral A K Chatterji
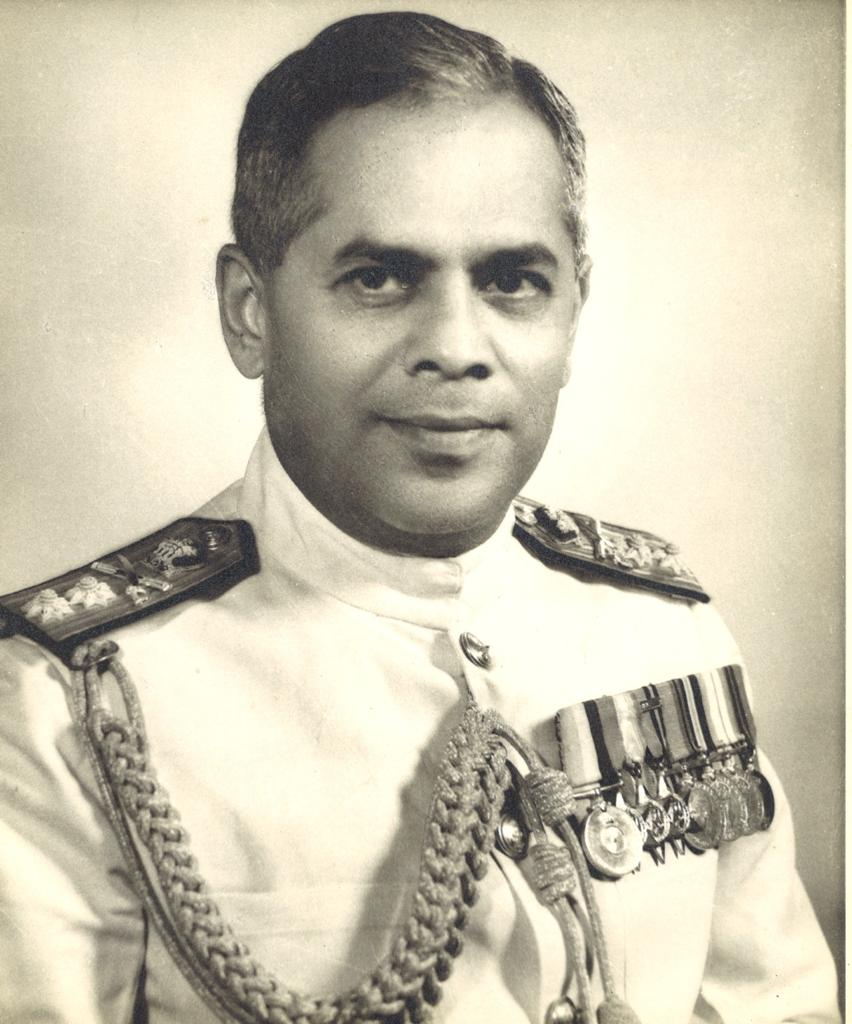
- Chatterji (pictured wearing Vice Admiral's insignia)

13th Chairman of the Chiefs of Staff Committee
- In office 15 July 1969 – 24 February 1970
- President: V. V. Giri; Mohammad Hidayatullah
- Prime Minister: Indira Gandhi
- Preceded by: Arjan Singh
- Succeeded by: Sam Manekshaw

5th chief of the naval staff
- In office 3 March 1966 – 28 February 1970
- President: Sir S. Radhakrishnan; Zakir Husain; V. V. Giri; Mohammad Hidayatullah
- Prime Minister: Gulzarilal Nanda (acting); Indira Gandhi
- Preceded by: Bhaskar Sadashiv Soman
- Succeeded by: Sardarilal Mathradas Nanda

Personal details
- Born: 22 November 1914 Dacca, Bengal Presidency, British India, present day Dhaka, Bangladesh
- Died: 6 August 2001 (aged 86) New Delhi, India
- Awards: PVSM

Military service
- Allegiance: British India (1914–1947); India (1947–1970)
- Branch/service: Royal Indian Navy (1933–1947); Indian Navy (1947–1970)
- Years of service: 1933–1970
- Rank: Admiral
- Commands: Chief of the Naval Staff; Indian Fleet; INS Delhi (1948); HMIS Kathiawar
- Battles/wars: World War II; Liberation of Goa; Indo-Pakistani War of 1965
- Later work(s): Indian Naval Adviser, High Commissioner of India to UK

Admiral Adhar Kumar Chatterji (4 March 1914 – 6 August 2001) was an admiral in the Indian Navy. He served as the 5th chief of the naval staff, from 4 March 1966, until 28 February 1970. He was the first Indian officer of the navy to hold the rank of full admiral. He is credited with the transformation of the Indian Navy. He made sweeping changes and restructured the navy, creating the Western and Eastern Naval Commands and the Western Fleet. Under him, the Indian Navy also entered the submarine age, with the commissioning of INS Kalvari (S23) in 1967.

== Early life ==
Chatterji was born in Dacca on 22 November 1914. He attended the Presidency College (as a graduating student of the University of Calcutta), graduating in 1933. The same year he saw a notice at the college about the relaxation of entry criteria for the Royal Indian Marine. He applied for and topped the Federal Public Service examination.

== Naval career ==
=== Early career ===
Chatterji was one of the first Indian cadet-entry officers to join the Royal Indian Navy in 1933. After training on board the Indian Mercantile Marine Training Ship (IMMTS) Dufferin, he was sent to the United Kingdom. He was commissioned into the Royal Indian Navy as a sub-lieutenant on 1 September 1935. He spent four years training on different ships. On 1 September 1938, he was promoted to the rank of lieutenant. In 1939, he was selected to specialise in anti-submarine warfare (ASW) and trained in the UK. He completed the course in August 1940 and was appointed an instructor at the ASW training school - HMS Osprey, Portland.

=== World War II ===
In late 1940, he was transferred to the Black Swan-class sloop HMIS Sutlej (U95). On 1 January 1942, he was appointed the first officer-in-charge of the ASW school in India - at castle barracks. He also served on board the Black Swan-class sloop HMIS Jumna (U21). On 23 October 1944, he was promoted to the acting rank of lieutenant-commander and appointed commanding officer of the Bangor-class minesweeper HMIS Kathiawar (J155). Kathiawar was a part of the Eastern Fleet, and escorted numerous convoys between Africa, British India and Australia in 1943-45. He then was appointed officer-in-charge of the radar school HMIS Chamak in Karachi. He was promoted to substantive lieutenant-commander on 1 September 1946. In January 1947, he was selected to attend the Royal Naval College, Greenwich in the UK.

=== Post-Independence ===
Chatterji completed the staff course and returned to India in August 1947. He was hand-picked by the chief of staff to the Commander-in-Chief, Royal Indian Navy, Commodore Martin Henry St. Leger Nott to head the Plans directorate as the director of naval planning at Naval HQ in the rank of commander. Among the officers serving under him in the directorate was Lieutenant Commander Nilakanta Krishnan. During this stint, he was the lead author of the Plan paper of 1948. In February 1949, he was appointed commander (executive officer) of the flagship INS Delhi (C74) and replaced Commander Ram Dass Katari. In June 1950, he was promoted to the acting rank of captain and appointed commanding officer of the Delhi. He was the first Indian officer to command the ship. After a short tenure, he relinquished command, handing over to Captain S. G. Karmarkar in October 1950.

In November 1950, Chatterji was appointed the naval adviser (NA) to the high commissioner of India to the United Kingdom. He served as the NA to high commissioners V. K. Krishna Menon and B. G. Kher. He oversaw the training of hundreds naval cadets and junior officers in the UK. He was promoted to the substantive rank of captain on 30 June 1951. In December 1952, he was appointed captain (D) 11th Destroyer Flotilla as well as the commanding officer of the lead destroyer of the squadron INS Rajput (D141). But the orders were cancelled and he took command of the Delhi for the second time in January 1953. In mid-1953, to commemorate the Coronation of Elizabeth II, a massive Coronation review of the fleet was held at Portsmouth. The flagship INS Delhi, commanded by Chatterji, destroyer INS Ranjit, commanded by Commander Sardarilal Mathradas Nanda, and the frigate INS Tir (K256), commanded by Commander Nilakanta Krishnan, represented India at the review. A naval armada consisting of ships from the Indian Navy, Royal Navy, Royal Australian Navy and the Royal New Zealand Navy sailed from Portsmouth to Gibraltar. The fleet carried out exercises along the way and was under the command of Lord Mountbatten.

In November 1954, Chatterji was promoted to the acting rank of commodore. This made him the fourth Indian naval officer to be promoted to this rank, after Ajitendu Chakraverti, Ram Dass Katari and Bhaskar Sadashiv Soman. He was appointed the Commodore-in-Charge Bombay (COMBAY), taking over from Chakraverti. The Bombay Command was the predecessor of the Western Naval Command. He held this appointment for two years, till November 1956. In October 1956, Chatterji was selected to attend the Imperial Defence College (IDC) and embarked for the UK in early 1957. After completing the year-long course, he returned to India and was appointed the Deputy Chief of the Naval Staff on 8 February 1958.

=== Flag Rank ===
On 5 March 1959, the appointment was upgraded to two-star rank and Chatterji was promoted to the acting rank of rear admiral. Promotion to the substantive rank of rear admiral followed, on 5 March 1960.

In May 1962, Chatterji took over as the fourth Flag Officer Commanding Indian Fleet. The aircraft carrier INS Vikrant had joined the Indian Navy in 1961 and was the flagship. AS commanding officer, Chatterji flew his flag on the Vikrant. In September 1962, he led the fleet in joint naval-air exercises in the Arabian Sea. Taking part were the aircraft embarked on the Vikrant, the aircraft from the Naval air station INS Garuda and the aircraft of the Indian Air Force. In mid-1963, Chatterji led the fleet in exercises in the Arabian Sea, Indian Ocean and the Bay of Bengal. After this, the fleet called on ports in Malaya, Singapore and Thailand. During the exercise and goodwill visit, Chatterji flew his flag on the flagship INS Mysore (C60), which became the first Indian cruiser to visit Thailand. After commanding the Indian fleet for about two years, he relinquished command, handing over to Rear Admiral S.M. Nanda. In January 1964, Chatterji was promoted to the acting rank of vice admiral and appointed the second Commandant of the National Defence College. He was the first Naval Officer to hold the appointment.

=== Chief of Naval Staff ===
In November 1965, Chatterji was appointed the seventh chief of the naval staff. On 4 March 1966, he took over from Vice Admiral Soman. He was confirmed in his rank of vice-admiral on 22 November 1966, and was promoted to the rank of admiral on 1 March 1968, the first Indian officer to hold the rank.

Admiral Chatterji retired from the Indian Navy on 28 February 1970.

== Death ==
Admiral Chatterji died in New Delhi at the age of 86.

== Citations ==
Military offices
Preceded by Geoffrey Barnard	Commanding officer INS Delhi; 1950–1950	Succeeded by S. G. Karmarkar
Preceded by S. G. Karmarkar	Commanding officer INS Delhi; 1953–1954	Succeeded by Benjamin Abraham Samson
Preceded by Ajitendu Chakraverti	Commodore-in-Charge Bombay; 1954–1956	Succeeded by Bhaskar Sadashiv Soman
Preceded by Ajitendu Chakraverti	Deputy Chief of the Naval Staff; 1958–1962	Succeeded by Sardarilal Mathradas Nanda
Preceded by Bhaskar Sadashiv Soman	Flag Officer Commanding Indian Fleet; 1962–1964	Succeeded by Benjamin Abraham Samson
Preceded by Lieutenant General Kanwar Bahadur Singh	Commandant of the National Defence College; 1964–1966	Succeeded by Air Marshal Ramaswamy Rajaram
Preceded by Bhaskar Sadashiv Soman	Chief of the Naval Staff; 1966–1970	Succeeded by Sardarilal Mathradas Nanda
