= Bhaskar Sadashiv Soman =

Indian Chief of Naval Staff

Admiral Bhaskar Sadashiv Soman
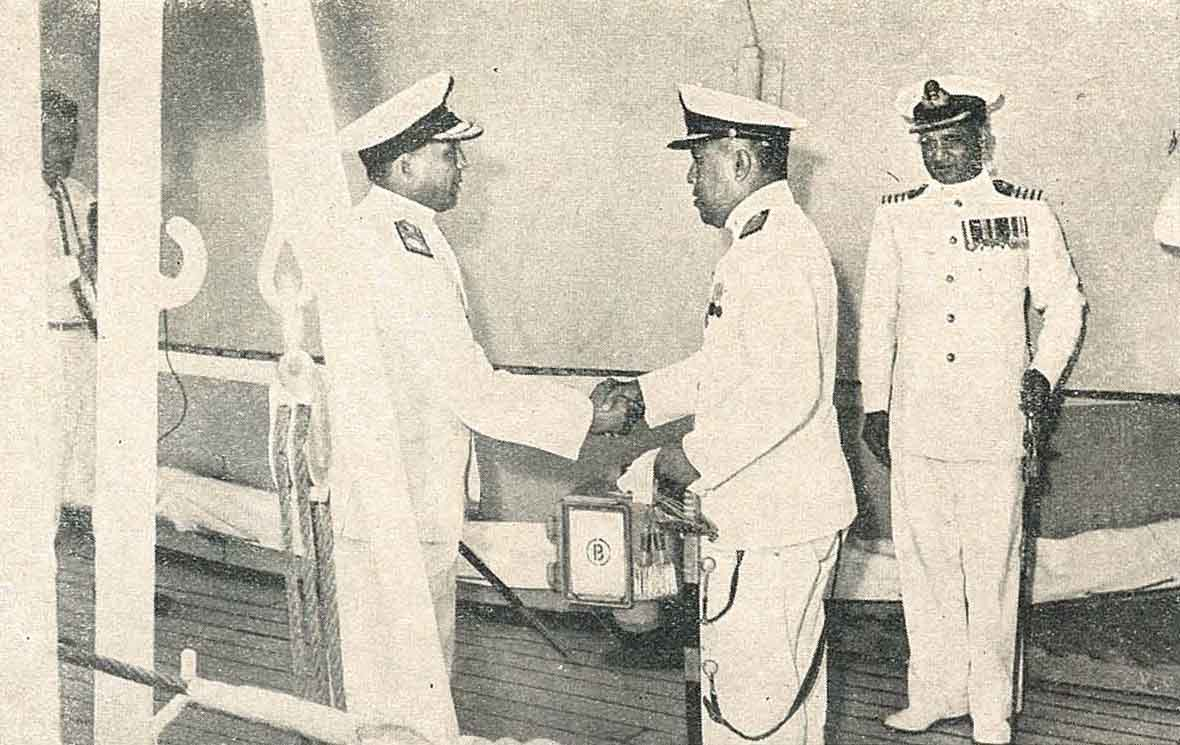
- Soman (left) with O.B. Sjaaf of the Indonesian Navy, 1960

4th Chief of the Naval Staff
- In office 4 June 1962 – 3 March 1966
- President: Sarvepalli Radhakrishnan
- Prime Minister: Jawaharlal Nehru; Gulzarilal Nanda (Acting); Lal Bahadur Shastri; Indira Gandhi
- Preceded by: Ram Dass Katari
- Succeeded by: Adhar Kumar Chatterji

Personal details
- Born: 13 March 1913 Gwalior, Gwalior State, British Raj
- Died: 8 February 1995 (aged 81) Pune, Maharashtra, India

Military service
- Allegiance: British India; India
- Branch/service: Royal Indian Navy; Indian Navy
- Years of service: 1932–1966
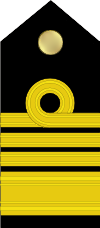
- Rank: Admiral
- Commands: Indian Fleet; Bombay Command; Commodore-in-Charge Cochin
- Battles/wars: World War II; Annexation of Goa; Indo-Pakistani War of 1965

Admiral Bhaskar Sadashiv Soman (30 March 1913 – 8 February 1995) was an Indian Navy Admiral. He was in command of the Indian Navy from 1962 to 1966 as the 4th Chief of the Naval Staff (CNS).

== Early life ==
Soman was born in Gwalior, the capital of the eponymous princely state. He received his early education at the Indian National Congress' Tilak Vidyalaya and at a school in Sangli State.

== Career ==
He subsequently entered the Royal Indian Marine (RIM), and following initial training on the training ship T/S Dufferin, was selected for officer training in the United Kingdom in 1932. He was appointed a sub-lieutenant in the RIM on 1 September 1934, and was promoted to lieutenant on 1 September 1937. During World War II, Soman was promoted to acting lieutenant-commander on 29 April 1944, and to the permanent rank of lieutenant-commander on 1 September 1945. During the war, he served in various shore establishments and in the service's Landing Craft Wing.

Soman was promoted to the acting rank of Commander in 1946 and was appointed Drafting Commander of the RIN, becoming the first Indian appointee to the post. He was promoted to acting captain on 21 July 1947. He was subsequently appointed Chief of Personnel, followed by appointment as Chief of Administration (COA) at Naval HQ. On 5 October 1949, he relinquished office, handing over to Captain S. G. Karmarkar and took over as Senior Officer, RIN Frigate Flotilla, commanding HMIS Jumna. He received promotion to the substantive rank of Captain on 31 December 1950. After a two year tenure as Senior Officer of 12th Frigate flotilla, he was appointed Commanding Officer of the flagship INS Delhi (C74). In 1952, he was appointed the first Indian Naval Officer-in-Charge (NOIC), Vishakapatnam, which oversaw the Boys' Training Establishment. In January 1954, he was appointed Commodore-in-Charge, Cochin (COMCHIN), with appointment as Commodore-in-Charge, Bombay, towards the end of 1956.

=== Flag Rank ===
With the upgrading of the post, he was promoted to Rear Admiral on 12 June 1958 and reappointed Flag Officer Commanding Bombay (FOB). In April 1960, he took over as Flag Officer Commanding Indian Fleet (FOCIF), and was in charge of India's naval operations during the 1961 Liberation of Goa.

He was appointed CNS on 5 June 1962 taking over from Vice Admiral Ram Dass Katari, with the acting rank of Vice Admiral, and was confirmed in the substantive rank on 22 November.

== Post-retirement ==
Soman retired from the Indian Navy on 22 November 1966, relinquishing the post of CNS as a Vice Admiral, then the highest attainable rank in the Navy. In 1968, the post of CNS was upgraded to the rank of full admiral, and on 21 October 1980, Soman and Ram Dass Katari, his predecessor as CNS, were promoted to the honorary rank of full Admiral on the retired list by President Neelam Sanjiva Reddy. Soman suffered a mild stroke in December 1994. In February 1995, he suffered a more serious stroke which led to his death at the age of 81.

Military offices
Preceded by Ram Dass Katari	Chief of the Naval Staff; 1962–1966	Succeeded by Adhar Kumar Chatterji
Preceded by Ajitendu Chakraverti	Flag Officer Commanding Indian Fleet; 1960–1962	Succeeded by Adhar Kumar Chatterji
New title Office created	Flag Officer Bombay; 1958–1960	Succeeded by S. G. Karmarkar
Preceded by Adhar Kumar Chatterji	Commodore-in-Charge Bombay; 1956–1958	Office abolished
Preceded by A D H Jay	Commodore-in-Charge Cochin; 1954–1956	Succeeded by S. G. Karmarkar
Preceded by Geoffrey Gowlland	Naval Officer-in-Charge, Visakhapatnam; 1951–1953	Succeeded by Reginald Sawhney
New title Office created	Chief of Materiel; 1949–1949	Succeeded by S. G. Karmarkar
Preceded by H R Inigo-Jones	Chief of Personnel; 1947–1949	Succeeded by Ram Dass Katari
