= HMIS Talwar =

Shore establishment of the British Royal Indian Navy

- Colaba, Bombay
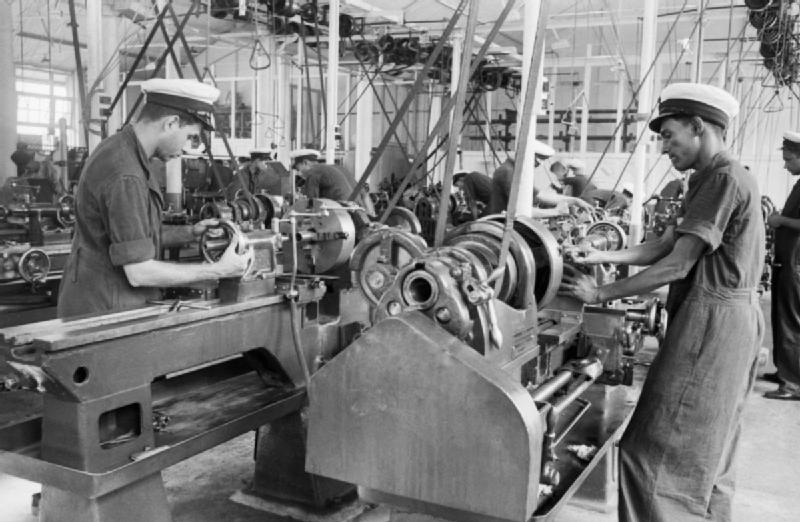
- Trainee mechanical engineers at HMIS Talwar, 1941.

Site information
- Type: Training School
- Controlled by: United Kingdom

Site history
- In use: 1943-1947

Garrison information
- Occupants: Royal Indian Navy

HMIS (His Majesty's Indian Ship) Talwar was a shore establishment of the British Royal Indian Navy during World War II in Colaba, Bombay.

== Service history ==
Talwar was opened in late 1943 as a Signals School and trained officers and ratings of the RIN in communications and radar. Some of the instructors from the Royal Navy, but most were RINVR officers.

=== The Bombay Mutiny ===
On 18 February 1946, the ratings of Talwar, declared a hartal ("strike"), and refused duty. The next day the "mutiny" spread to the RIN Depot at Castle Barracks, and to ships in Bombay harbour. Demonstrations became violent and several arrests were made. Flag Officer, Bombay, received delegates from the mutineers and was presented with a list of demands, including improvements in pay rates and conditions, faster demobilisation according to age and service, and disciplinary action against the commanding officer of Talwar for alleged poor treatment of ratings.
