= INS Delhi (C74) =

Leander-class light cruiser (1933–1978)

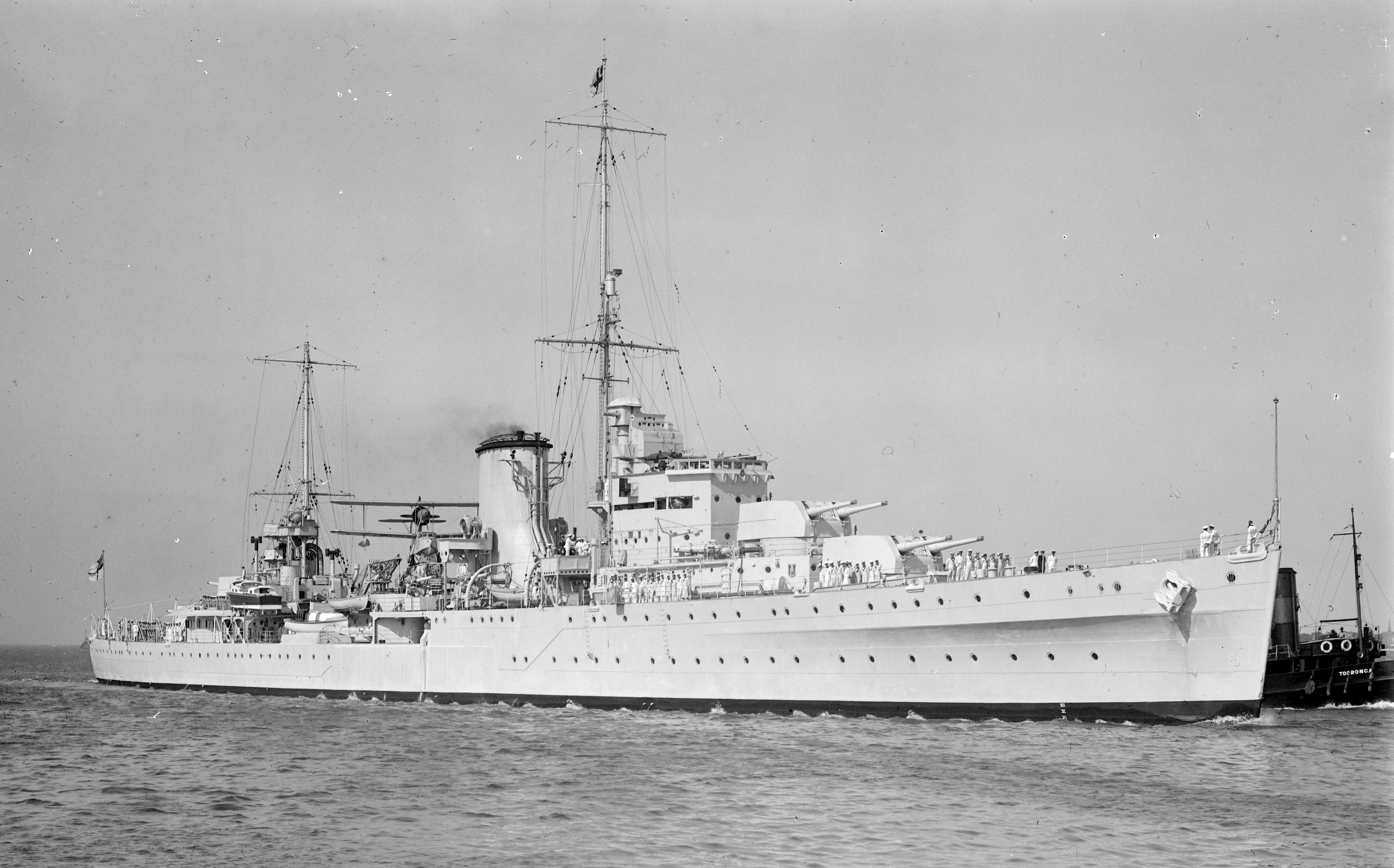
- The ship when serving as HMNZS Achilles

History

India
- Name: INS Delhi C74
- Namesake: Delhi
- Builder: Cammell Laird, Birkenhead
- Laid down: 11 June 1931
- Launched: 1 September 1932
- Acquired: by purchase, 1948
- Commissioned: 5 July 1948
- Decommissioned: 30 June 1978
- Identification: Pennant number: C74
- Fate: Scrapped, 1978

General characteristics
- Class & type: Leander-class light cruiser
- Displacement: 7,270 long tons (7,387 t) standard; 9,740 long tons (9,896 t) full load (Oct 1945)
- Length: 555 ft 6 in (169.32 m)
- Beam: 56 ft (17 m)
- Draught: 19 ft 2 in (5.84 m)
- Propulsion: 4 × Parsons geared steam turbines; 6 × Yarrow boilers; 4 shafts; 73,280 shp (55 MW)
- Speed: 32.5 knots (60.2 km/h; 37.4 mph)
- Range: 5,730 nmi (10,610 km) at 13 kn (24 km/h; 15 mph)
- Armament: Original configuration: 8 × BL 6 in Mk.XXIII (152 mm L/50) guns, twin turrets Mk.XXI; 4 × QF 4 in Mk.V (102 mm L/45) guns, single mounts HA Mk.IV; 12 × QF 0.5 in Mk.III Vickers (12.7 mm) machine guns, quad mounts Mk.I; 8 (2×4) tubes for 21-inch (533 mm) torpedo Mk.IX
- Armour: 3 in (76 mm) magazine box; 1 in (25 mm) deck; 1 in (25 mm) turrets

INS Delhi was a Leander-class light cruiser built for the Royal Navy in 1933 as HMS Achilles, and commissioned into the New Zealand Division of the Royal Navy (from 1941 the Royal New Zealand Navy) in 1937 as HMNZS Achilles. She was returned to the Royal Navy at the end of the Second World War and in 1948 was sold to the Royal Indian Navy to be recommissioned as HMIS Delhi. In 1950 she was renamed INS Delhi and remained in service until decommissioned at Bombay on 30 June 1978.

== History ==
The ship was commissioned into the Royal Indian Navy as HMIS Delhi under the command of Captain H. N. S. Brown of the Royal Navy on 5 July 1948 by the High Commissioner of India to the United Kingdom V. K. Krishna Menon. Captain Brown was also serving as Commodore Commanding Indian Naval Squadron (COMINS). She had 17 British officers and petty officers, the rest of the crew being Indian. Commander Ram Dass Katari was her executive officer and the senior-most Indian officer, while Lieutenant Commander Sardarilal Mathradas Nanda was her first lieutenant. On her way to India, she called at Portsmouth, Portland, Gibraltar and Malta. The Prime Minister of India Jawaharlal Nehru himself welcomed the ship at Bombay on 15 September 1948. She conducted her first major goodwill cruise in 1948, to East Africa, the Seychelles, and Mauritius.

After India became a Republic in January 1950, she was renamed INS Delhi. In June 1950, Commander Adhar Kumar Chatterji (later Chief of the Naval Staff) became her first Indian commanding officer; the same month she conveyed Prime Minister Jawaharlal Nehru to Indonesia on an official visit. In May 1951, the Government of New Zealand, in recognition of her services to New Zealand and as a goodwill gesture to India, presented a plaque to Captain S. G. Karmarkar, the commanding officer of the Delhi. The plaque, with the crests of both Achilles and Delhi was presented by the New Zealand Trade Commissioner in India.

On 31 May 1951, the Delhi escorted by the R-class destroyers INS Rajput, INS Ranjit and INS Rana and the frigates INS Jamuna, INS Kaveri and INS Sutlej sailed from Bombay, on a six-week goodwill cruise to East Africa and Madagascar. The commanding officer was Captain S. G. Karmarkar, the executive officer was Commander B. A. Samson and Lieutenant Commander JB Simmons was the first lieutenant.

The Rear Admiral Commanding Indian Naval Squadron (RACINS) Rear Admiral Geoffrey Barnard flew his flag on the Delhi. On the ship were also embarked, the Commander-in-Chief, Indian Navy Vice Admiral Sir Edward Parry and the Air Officer Commanding Operational Command Air Commodore Arjan Singh. The C-in-C and the AOC disembarked at Cochin and the Indian Naval squadron continued on its cruise.

Delhi called on Mombasa, Dar es Salaam, Diego Suarez. While at Mombasa, Jomo Kenyatta, the future first Prime Minister and President of Kenya visited the Delhi. He stayed on board the ship for a few days, being accommodated in Karmarkar's cabin. While returning to India, it called on Addu Atoll in the Maldives. Karmarkar later added about his ship, "The Delhi stood out majestically with great dignity and slick appearance."

In 1953 she took part in the Fleet Review to celebrate the Coronation of Queen Elizabeth II. In 1956, she played herself, as Achilles, in the film Battle of the River Plate. In 1968 she was moved to a training role.

=== Portuguese–Indian War ===
On 18 December 1961, during the annexation of the Portuguese State of India, also known as "Operation Vijay" or the Portuguese-Indian War, in which Goa and its dependencies of Daman and Diu were annexed, Delhi was tasked to patrol the waters off Diu. At dawn, the ship was spotted by the Portuguese defenders, but they did not recognize its hoisted battle flag. The Portuguese land based artillery did not open fire considering it might be a cargo vessel. Indian Navy reports state that Delhi supported the Indian Army's advance by firing on the citadel, and neutralizing the airport control tower. The detailed Portuguese reports on the invasion do not mention fire from the main 6-inch (150 mm) guns of the Indian cruiser, though a possible cause of the discrepancy is that the source of the fire from the ageing cruiser may not have been identified, due to the Indian Army firing from the landward side. Alternatively, the cruiser's shells may have fallen short of the citadel.

The only documented event of naval action between India and Portugal in Portuguese reports in the Diu region, was the sinking of the Portuguese patrol boat NRP Vega by Indian Air Force aircraft, after Vega opened fire on them with its sole Oerlikon 20 mm cannon, killing two of the crew, including his captain. After the sinking, the survivors of the Vega were taken prisoner-of-war on the shore.

In another naval action of the Portuguese-Indian War, NRP Afonso de Albuquerque engaged several Indian frigates that were trying to force the entry in Mormugao harbour, Goa, being severely damaged and stranded after sustaining an hour of combat.

=== Visit to New Zealand ===
In 1969, Delhi visited New Zealand under Captain V. E. C. Barboza. The visit was the occasion of many reunions of Achilles veterans who were plied with large quantities of rum and beer, and taken on a quick trip by the ship.

=== Decommissioning ===
Delhi was decommissioned at Bombay in 1978. Subsequently, one of her gun turrets was sent to New Zealand, where it is preserved. A second turret, or gun, is reported to be preserved at the Regiment of Artillery Museum Nashik. The precise fate of the third turret is unknown, but a persistent rumour holds that it was officially recorded as "eaten by white ants". The remainder of the ship was scrapped. The main mast serves as the quarterdeck through which cadets from the National Defence Academy of India pass out.

== Sources ==
- Campbell, John (1985). Naval Weapons of World War Two. Naval Institute Press. ISBN 0-87021-459-4.
- Lenton, H.T. & Colledge, J.J (1968). British and Dominion Warships of World War Two. Doubleday and Company.
- Singh, Satyindra (1991). Blueprint to Bluewater: The Indian Navy, 1951-65. Lancer International. ISBN 978-8170621485.
