= HMNZS Achilles =

Leander-class cruiser

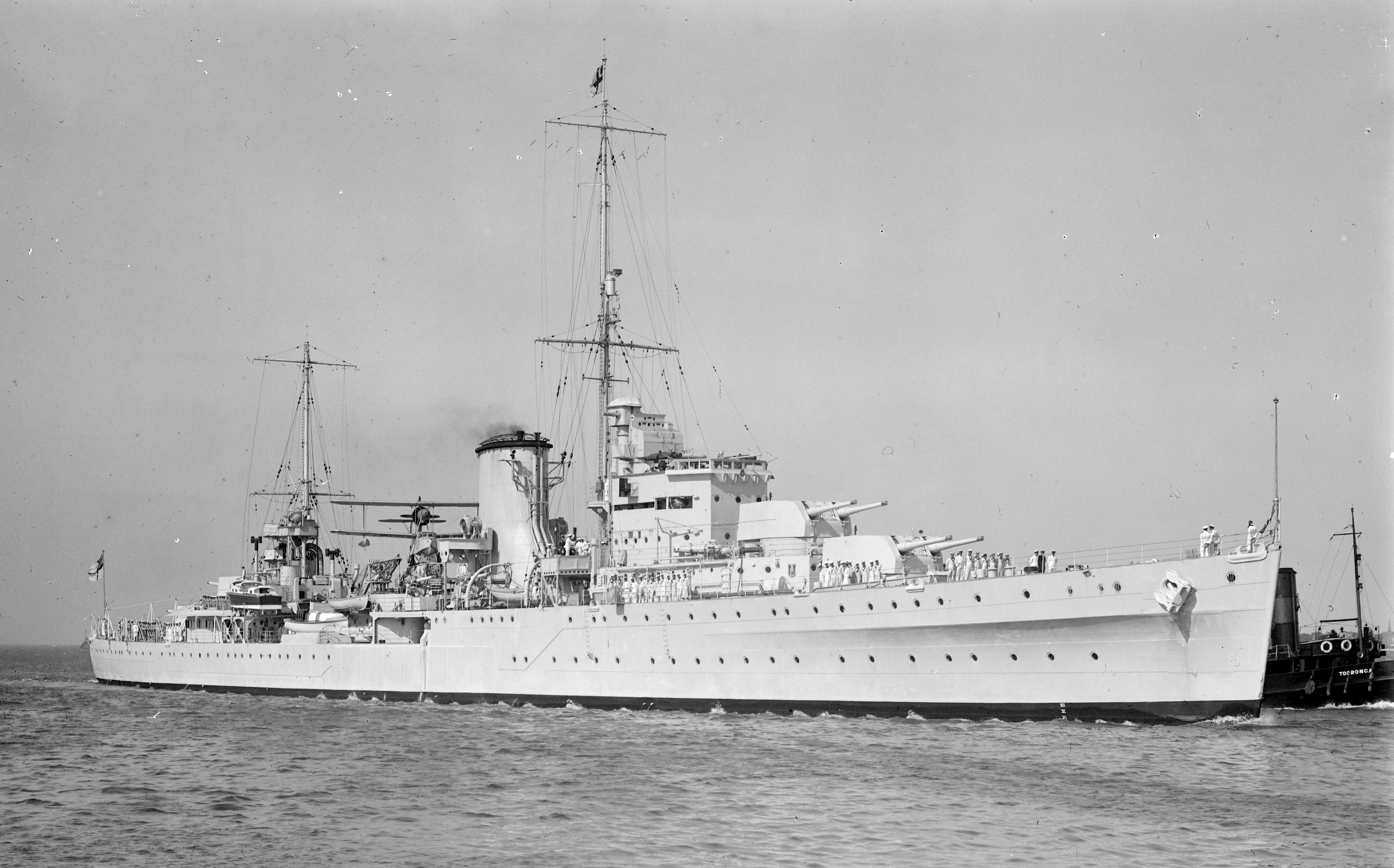

History

United Kingdom
- Name: HMS Achilles
- Namesake: Achilles
- Builder: Cammell Laird, Birkenhead
- Laid down: 11 June 1931
- Launched: 1 September 1932
- Commissioned: 10 October 1933
- Out of service: Loaned to Royal New Zealand Navy 1 October 1936
- Identification: Pennant number: 70
- Honours and awards: River Plate 1939
- Fate: Sold to Indian Navy 5 July 1948

New Zealand
- Name: HMNZS Achilles
- Commissioned: 1 October 1941
- Decommissioned: 17 September 1946
- Identification: Pennant number: 70
- Honours and awards: Guadalcanal 1942-43, Okinawa 1945
- Fate: Returned to Royal Navy 17 September 1946

General characteristics
- Class & type: Leander-class light cruiser
- Displacement: 7,270 tons standard; 9,740 tons full load (Oct 1945)
- Length: 555.5 ft (169.3 m)
- Beam: 56 ft (17 m)
- Draught: 19.1 ft (5.8 m)
- Installed power: 73,280 shaft horsepower (54,640 kW)
- Propulsion: Four Parsons geared steam turbines; Six Yarrow boilers; Four shafts
- Speed: 32.5 knots (60 km/h)
- Range: 5,730 nmi (10,610 km; 6,590 mi) at 13 kn (24 km/h)
- Complement: peacetime 550; wartime 680
- Armament: 8 × BL 6 in Mk.XXIII (152 mm L/50) guns, twin turrets Mk.XXI; 4 × QF 4 in Mk.V (102 mm L/45) guns, single mounts HA Mk.IV; 12 × QF 0.5 in Mk.III Vickers (12.7 mm) machine guns, quad mounts Mk.I; 8 (2×4) tubes for 21-inch (533 mm) torpedo Mk.IX
- Armour: 3 in magazine box 1 inch deck 1 inch turrets
- Aircraft carried: Catapult-launched Fairey Seafox; Amphibious Supermarine Walrus; Radio controlled DH.82 Queen Bee

HMNZS Achilles was a Leander-class light cruiser, the second of five in the class. She served in the Royal New Zealand Navy in the Second World War. She was launched in 1932 as HMS Achilles for the Royal Navy, placed in the New Zealand Division of the Royal Navy in 1936, and transferred to the new Royal New Zealand Navy in 1941. As HMS Achilles, with a mix of British and New Zealander crew, she became famous for her part in the Battle of the River Plate in 1939, alongside HMS Ajax and HMS Exeter and notable for being the first Royal Navy cruiser to have fire control radar, with the installation of the New Zealand-made SS1 fire-control radar in June 1940.

After Second World War service in the Atlantic and Pacific, she was returned to the Royal Navy. She was sold to the Indian Navy in 1948 and recommissioned as INS Delhi. She was scrapped in 1978.

== Design ==
She was the second of five ships of the Leander-class light cruisers, designed as effective follow-ons to the York class. Upgraded to Improved Leander-class, she could carry an aircraft and was the first ship to carry a Supermarine Walrus, although both Walruses were lost before the Second World War began. At one time she carried the unusual DH.82 Queen Bee which was a radio-controlled unmanned aircraft, normally used as a drone.

== Service ==
Achilles was originally built for the Royal Navy, and was commissioned as HMS Achilles on 10 October 1933. She would serve with the Royal Navy's New Zealand Division from 31 March 1936 up to the creation of the Royal New Zealand Navy, into which she was transferred in September 1941 and recommissioned HMNZS Achilles. About 60 per cent of her crew was from New Zealand.

At the outbreak of the Second World War, Achilles began patrolling the west coast of South America looking for German merchant ships. On 2 October 1939, Achilles, then operating with the liner Orduna north of Callao off the west coast of South America, was instructed that after fuelling from the fleet tanker RFA Orangeleaf, she was to proceed south about to the South Atlantic. "The Achilles was to show herself at Chilean ports as considered desirable and refuel at the Falkland Islands. The passage was to be made with moderate despatch and on arrival the cruiser was to come under the orders of the Commander-in-Chief, Africa." Thus Achilles arrived in the South Atlantic and joined the South American Division under Commodore Henry Harwood, later to take part in the Battle of the River Plate against the Graf Spee.

By 22 October 1939 she had arrived at the Falkland Islands, where she was reassigned to Harwood, and allocated to Force G with Exeter and Cumberland.

=== Battle of the River Plate ===
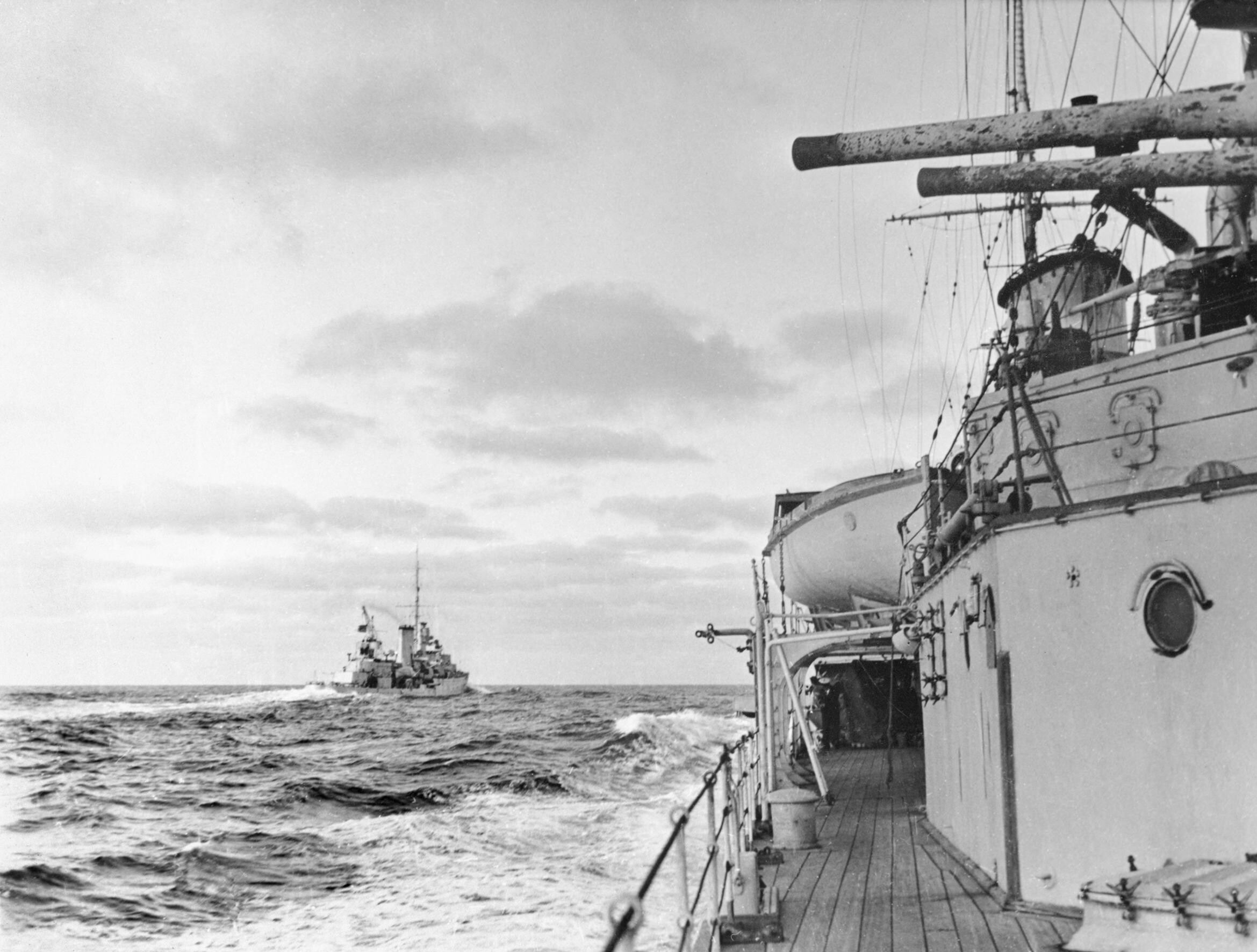
Achilles as seen from Ajax at the Battle of the River Plate

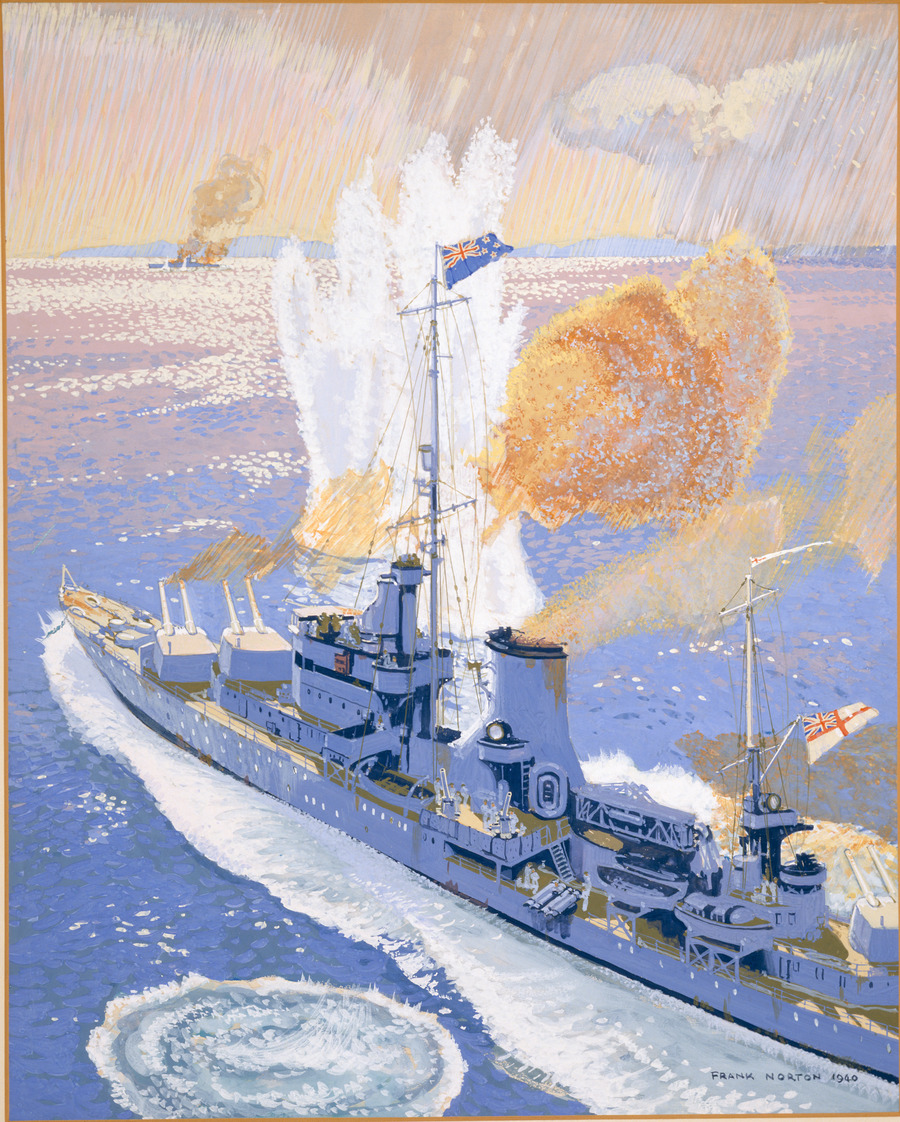
HMS "Achilles" in Battle of the River Plate , a painting by Frank Norton, is part of the National Collection of War Art held by Archives New Zealand

In the early morning of 13 December 1939, a force consisting of Achilles, Ajax and Exeter detected smoke on the horizon, which was confirmed at 06:16 to be a pocket battleship, thought to be the German battleship Admiral Scheer but which turned out to be Admiral Graf Spee. A fierce battle ensued, at a range of about 11 nautical miles (20 km). Achilles suffered some damage. In the exchange of fire, four crew were killed, her captain, W. E. Parry, was wounded; 36 of Graf Spee's crew were killed.

The range reduced to about 4 nautical miles (7.4 km) at around 07:15 and Graf Spee broke off the engagement around 07:45 to head for the neutral harbour of Montevideo which she entered at 22:00 that night, having been pursued by Achilles and Ajax all day. Graf Spee was forced by international law to leave within 72 hours. Faced with what he believed to be overwhelming odds, the captain of Graf Spee, Hans Langsdorff, scuttled his ship rather than risk the lives of his crew. An ensign flag flown by HMNZS Achilles in the Battle of the River Plate was donated to Christ Church Cathedral in the Falkland Islands and is still on display hanging on the south wall of the Cathedral at Port Stanley.

=== Pacific theatre ===
Following the Atlantic battle, Achilles returned to Auckland, New Zealand, on 23 February 1940, where she underwent a refit until June. After German raider activity in the South Pacific in 1940 Achilles escorted the first Trans-Tasman commercial convoy, VK.1, composed of Empire Star, Port Chalmers, Empress of Russia, and Maunganui leaving Sydney 30 December 1940 for Auckland. After Japan entered the war, she escorted troop convoys, then joined the ANZAC Squadron in the south-west Pacific.

Achilles met HMAS Canberra, flagship of Rear-Admiral John G. Crace, and HMAS Perth in December 1941 to form an escort for the Pensacola Convoy.

While operating off Guadalcanal Island with US Navy Task Force 67 on 5 January 1943, she was attacked by four Japanese aircraft. A bomb blew the top off X turret, killing 13 sailors. Between April 1943 and May 1944 Achilles was docked in Portsmouth, England for repairs and modernisation. Her single 4-inch AA guns were replaced by the dual-purpose QF 4 inch Mk XVI naval gun in four twin mountings, modern radar was fitted, and the damaged X turret was replaced by four QF 2 pom poms in a quadruple-mount. The work was delayed by a dockyard explosion that killed 14 men. Stoker William Dale was awarded the Albert Medal for Lifesaving for his actions in saving the lives of several dockyard workers.

Sent back to the New Zealand Fleet, Achilles next joined the British Pacific Fleet in May 1945 for final operations in the Pacific War.

== Indian Navy ==
After the war, Achilles was returned to the Royal Navy at Sheerness in Kent, England on 17 September 1946. She was then sold to the Indian Navy and recommissioned on 5 July 1948 as INS Delhi. She remained in service until decommissioned for scrap in Bombay on 30 June 1978. In 1968 she was present at the granting of independence to Mauritius representing the Indian Government together with the Royal Navy frigate Tartar under Captain Cameron Rusby. As part of the scrapping her Y turret was removed and presented as a gift to the New Zealand government. It is now on display at the entrance of Devonport Naval Base in Auckland. On 22 January 1979, Admiral Jal Cursetji, the Indian Navy Chief of the Naval Staff, presented Achilles's builder's plaque, steering wheel and engine room telegraph to Admiral Terence Lewin, the First Sea Lord and Chief of the Naval Staff of the Royal Navy.

Achilles played herself in the film The Battle of the River Plate in 1956.
