= HMIS Madras =

History

India
- Name: Madras
- Ordered: 24 September 1940
- Builder: Cockatoo Docks and Engineering Company
- Laid down: 4 August 1941
- Launched: 17 February 1942
- Commissioned: 12 May 1942
- Decommissioned: 1960

General characteristics
- Class & type: Bathurst-class minesweeper
- Displacement: 1,025 tons (full war load)
- Length: 186 ft (57 m)
- Beam: 31 ft (9.4 m)
- Draught: 8.5 ft (2.6 m)
- Propulsion: Triple expansion, 2 shafts. 2,000 hp
- Speed: 15 knots (28 km/h; 17 mph)
- Complement: 85
- Sensors & processing systems: Type 128 asdic
- Armament: 1 × 12-pounder gun or 1 × 4 inchgun, 1 × 40 mm Bofors gun, 2-3 × 20 mm Oerlikon guns, up to 40 depth charges

HMIS Madras (J237) was a Bathurst-class minesweeper that served in the Royal Indian Navy (RIN) during World War II.

== History ==
HMIS Madras was ordered in 1940, and built at Cockatoo Docks in Australia. She was commissioned in 1942 into the Eastern Fleet. She escorted a number of convoys until the end of the war.

== See also ==
- INS Chennai (D65)
