= INS Angre =

Indian navy establishment

INS Angre
- Shahid Bhagat Singh Road, Mumbai in India
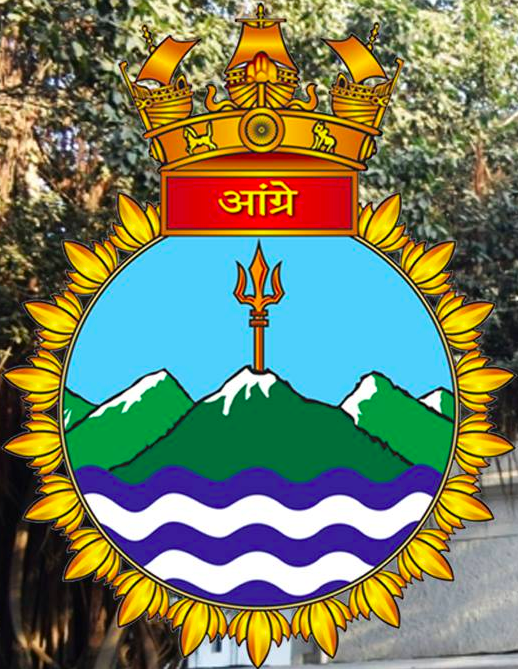
- Crest of INS Angre

Site information
- Type: Naval shore establishment
- Owner: Ministry of Defence
- Operator: Indian Navy
- Condition: Operational

Site history
- In use: 1940 – present

Garrison information
- Past commanders: S. M. Nanda; S. G. Karmarkar

INS Angre is a "stone frigate" (shore establishment) of the Indian Navy in Mumbai. It is the shore-based logistics and administrative support establishment of the Western Naval Command. It is also the base depot ship of the command and is the seat of the flag officer commanding-in-chief Western Naval Command. The establishment is named after the Maratha Navy admiral Kanhoji Angre.

== History ==
In 1548, Garcia de Orta leased the marshy islands, which later became Bombay, from John III of Portugal. Orta build a wooden structure called the Manor House. Later, a seawall was constructed around Manor House, with four guns mounted on it and the area came to be known as Castle Barracks. In the Marriage Treaty of Charles II of England and Catherine of Braganza, daughter of King John IV of Portugal, the islands were given in dowry to the English empire. In 1668, the East India Company (EIC) leased Bombay from the empire and in 1686, the headquarters in India of the EIC was moved from Surat to Castle Barracks.

In 1940, the castle was commissioned as HMIS Dalhousie as a naval base of the Royal Indian Navy. On 26 January 1950, when India became a republic, the base was renamed INS Dalhousie. On 15 September 1951, INS Dalhousie was renamed INS Angre in honour of the famous admiral (sarkhel) of the Maratha Navy, Kanhoji Angre.

== Today ==
INS Angre today is the base depot ship of the Western Naval Command. It is the logistics and administrative support establishment of the command, supporting all ships and units based in Mumbai. The Manor House, which has since been re-built, is the seat of the flag officer commanding-in-chief Western Naval Command. The commanding officer (CO) of the establishment is also the station commander of South Mumbai and is a one-star officer with the rank of commodore. Since the establishment is also known as Naval barracks, the CO is also known as COMBRAX (Commodore Naval Barracks).

== Crest ==
The crest of INS Angre has peaks of the Sahyadri mountain range (also known as Western ghats) on which is planted a trident. The trident was a symbol of power worshipped by the Marathas under Chhatrapati Shivaji.

== See also ==
- List of Indian Navy bases
- List of active Indian Navy ships
- Stone frigate

== Bibliography ==
- Hiranandani, G. M. (2010), Transition to Guardianship: The Indian Navy 1991-2000, Lancer InterConsult, Incorporated, ISBN 978-1935501268
