= HMIS Cauvery =

History

India
- Name: Cauvery
- Namesake: Kaveri River
- Ordered: 10 September 1941
- Builder: Yarrow Shipbuilders
- Laid down: 28 October 1942
- Launched: 15 June 1943
- Commissioned: 26 August 1943
- Decommissioned: 1977
- Renamed: Kaveri
- Honours and awards: Burma, 1944-45
- Fate: Scrapped 1979

General characteristics
- Class & type: Black Swan-class sloop
- Displacement: 1,250 tons original; 1,350 tons modified
- Length: 299 ft 6 in (91.29 m)
- Beam: 37 ft 6 in (11.43 m) original; 38 ft 6 in (11.73 m) modified
- Draught: 11 ft (3.4 m)
- Propulsion: Geared turbines, 2 shafts: 3,600 hp (2.68 MW) (original); 4,300 hp (3.21 MW) (modified)
- Speed: 19 knots (35 km/h) (original); 20 knots (37 km/h) (modified)
- Range: 7,500 nmi (13,900 km) at 12 kn (22 km/h)
- Complement: 180 (original); 192 (modified)
- Sensors & processing systems: Type 272 surface radar; Type 285 fire-control radar
- Armament: 6 × QF 4 in (102 mm) Mk XVI AA guns (3 × 2); 4 × 2-pounder AA pom-pom; 4 × 0.5-inch (12.7 mm) AA machine guns (original); 12 × 20 mm Oerlikon AA (6 × 2) (modified)

HMIS Cauvery, pennant number U10, was a Black Swan-class sloop which served in the Royal Indian Navy (RIN) during World War II.

== History ==
HMIS Cauvery was ordered in 1941 as a part of the 1940 Build Program for the Royal Indian Navy. She was built by Yarrow Shipbuilders, Limited and commissioned in October 1943.

With World War II underway, she was immediately deployed as a convoy escort in the Home Fleet. In February 1944, she was transferred to the Eastern Fleet. En route, she continued to escort various convoys, until joining the fleet in April. She was again deployed as a convoy escort in the Bay of Bengal and the Indian Ocean.

In May–June, she was part of the force deployed to support amphibious landings of the British Indian Army and the British Army in Rangoon as a part of Operation Dragoon. Between July–October, she joined Force 66 in anti-submarine operations in the Indian Ocean.

After a refit at Bombay, in March 1945, HMIS Cauvery played a major role in the bombardment of Letpan in Burma in preparation of landings by the Indian 4th Brigade to cut off the retreat of Japanese Imperial Army as a part of Operation Turret. In April, she was part of the task force for supporting the amphibious landings on Indian 26th Division on Akyab peninsula as a part of Operation Dracula. Other ships supporting the operation included fellow sloops Godavari, Kistna, Narbada, Sutlej and Hindustan. The task force then continued on patrol duty between the Andamans and Burma.

In July, HMIS Cauvery was deployed to Malacca Straits for minesweeping operations as a part of Operation Collie. She was prepared for an amphibious assault on the Malayan coast, before the postponement of Operation Zipper.

At the end of the war, she was in Singapore for the Japanese surrender ceremony.

After India's independence, she was renamed INS Kaveri and served as a part of the 12th Frigate Squadron. She was decommissioned in 1977 and subsequently scrapped.
