= HMS Rotherham =

Destroyer of the Royal Navy

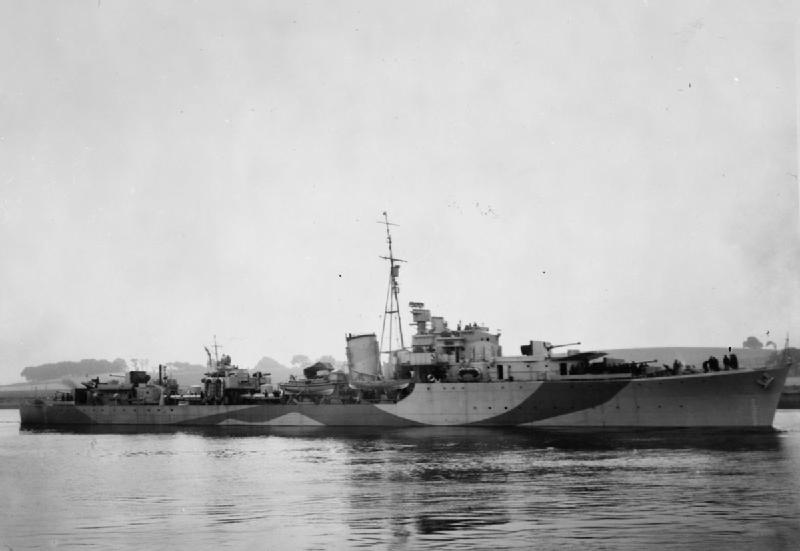
- Rotherham on completion, September 1942

History

United Kingdom
- Name: HMS Rotherham
- Namesake: Captain Edward Rotheram
- Ordered: 2 April 1940
- Builder: John Brown & Company, Clydebank
- Laid down: 10 April 1941
- Launched: 21 March 1942
- Completed: 27 August 1942
- Commissioned: August 1942
- Decommissioned: 1945
- Identification: Pennant number: H09
- Honours and awards: Battle honours: Sabang 1944; Burma
- Fate: Sold to India, 1948; Scrapped, 1976
- Badge: On a Field Blue, a stag trippant Gold between a wreath of oak also Gold

India
- Name: INS Rajput
- Namesake: Rajput
- Acquired: 1948
- Commissioned: 27 July 1949
- Decommissioned: 1976
- Identification: D141
- Fate: Scrapped

General characteristics
- Class & type: R-class destroyer
- Displacement: 1,705 long tons (1,732 t) light; 2,425 long tons (2,464 t) full load
- Length: 358 ft 3 in (109.2 m) o/a
- Beam: 35 ft 9 in (10.9 m)
- Draught: 9 ft 6 in (2.9 m)
- Propulsion: 2 × Admiralty 3-drum water-tube boilers; Parsons geared steam turbines; 40,000 shp (30,000 kW); 2 shafts
- Speed: 36 knots (67 km/h; 41 mph)
- Range: 4,675 nmi (8,658 km) at 20 kn (37 km/h; 23 mph)
- Complement: 237
- Sensors & processing systems: Type 290 air warning radar; Type 285 ranging & bearing radar; Huff-Duff (High-frequency Direction-finder)
- Armament: 4 × QF 4.7 inch (120 mm) Mk.IX guns, single mounts CP Mk.XVIII; 4 × QF 2 pdr Mk.VIII (40 mm L/39), quad mount Mk.VII; 6 × QF 20 mm Oerlikon, single mount P Mk.III; 8 (2×4) torpedo tubes for 21 in Mk.IX torpedoes; 4 × throwers & 2 × racks, 70 depth charges

HMS Rotherham was an R-class destroyer of the British Royal Navy during the Second World War, named after Captain Edward Rotheram, who commanded HMS Royal Sovereign during at the Battle of Trafalgar in 1805. Rotherham was completed in 1942 and equipped as a flotilla leader, having slightly reduced armament to allow for the increased complement and working space required. Decommissioned in 1945, the ship was sold to India in 1948, serving as INS Rajput (D141) until 1976, when she was scrapped.

== Royal Navy service ==
=== World War II ===
Rotherham was commissioned for service, after completing her sea trials, in August 1942. After a period of training at Scapa Flow, she was assigned to serve in the South Atlantic, operating as convoy escort between Freetown, Sierra Leone, and Cape Town and Durban, South Africa for the rest of the year.

From February 1944 Rotherham was deployed in the Indian Ocean, and in April joined the Eastern Fleet to take part in series of offensive operations against the Japanese in Sumatra and Java, and the Indian nationalist Azad Hind in the Andaman Islands, acting as an escort to aircraft carriers and battleships. In October 1944 Rotherham sailed to Simon's Town to refit.

In early 1945 Rotherham was deployed intercepting Japanese ships supplying stores and carrying personnel to the Andaman and Nicobar Islands, as well as providing support for military operations in Burma. In February, along with her sister ships Rapid, Rocket, and Roebuck, she carried out a bombardment of Great Coco Island, in which more than a thousand 4.7 inch shells were fired by the four ships. Further anti-shipping and shore bombardments followed, and in April she provided cover for Allied landings near Rangoon during "Operation Dracula". Escort duties continued until the Japanese surrender on 15 August.

=== Post-war operations ===
Rotherham was then deployed in "Operation Zipper", the British liberation of Penang, and in early September, as part of "Operation Tiderace", escorted a fleet led by the cruiser Sussex to Singapore to take the surrender of the 77,000 Japanese there. Rotherham's commander personally accepted the surrender of 34,000 personnel of the Imperial Japanese Navy at the Singapore Naval Dockyard at Sembawang, and in commemoration the main entrance was renamed the "Rotherham Gate". The ship remained at Singapore until 27 September 1945, when she sailed to Trincomalee, leaving there on 2 October for Portsmouth, where she was decommissioned and put into the Reserve.

== Indian Navy service ==
Rotherham was sold to India in 1948, and formally transferred to the Indian Navy on 27 July 1949 as INS Rajput (D141) She saw active service during the Indo-Pakistani War of 1971. India maintains that the INS Rajput was responsible for sinking the Pakistan Navy submarine Ghazi, though Pakistan contests this. After sailing over 4000KM, PNS Ghazi suffered the final damage in the area where INS Rajput deployed the depth charges.

Rajput remained an active fleet unit until 1976 when she was placed on the Disposal List and then scrapped.

== Bibliography ==
- Chesneau, Roger, ed. (1980). Conway's All the World's Fighting Ships 1922–1946. Greenwich, UK: Conway Maritime Press. ISBN 0-85177-146-7.
- Colledge, J. J.; Warlow, Ben (2006) [1969]. Ships of the Royal Navy: The Complete Record of All Fighting Ships of the Royal Navy from the 15th Century to the Present (3rd Rev ed.). London: Chatham Publishing. ISBN 978-1-86176-281-8. OCLC 67375475.
- English, John (2001). Obdurate to Daring: British Fleet Destroyers 1941–45. Windsor, UK: World Ship Society. ISBN 978-0-9560769-0-8.
- Friedman, Norman (2006). British Destroyers & Frigates: The Second World War and After. Annapolis, Maryland: Naval Institute Press. ISBN 1-86176-137-6.
- Lenton, H. T. (1998). British & Empire Warships of the Second World War. Annapolis, Maryland: Naval Institute Press. ISBN 1-55750-048-7.
- Raven, Alan & Roberts, John (1978). War Built Destroyers O to Z Classes. London: Bivouac Books. ISBN 0-85680-010-4.
- Rohwer, Jürgen (2005). Chronology of the War at Sea 1939–1945: The Naval History of World War Two (Third Revised ed.). Annapolis, Maryland: Naval Institute Press. ISBN 1-59114-119-2.
- Whitley, M. J. (1988). Destroyers of World War 2. Annapolis, Maryland: Naval Institute Press. ISBN 0-87021-326-1.
