= Mihir K. Roy =

Indian Navy Admiral

Vice Admiral M. K. Roy PVSM, AVSM
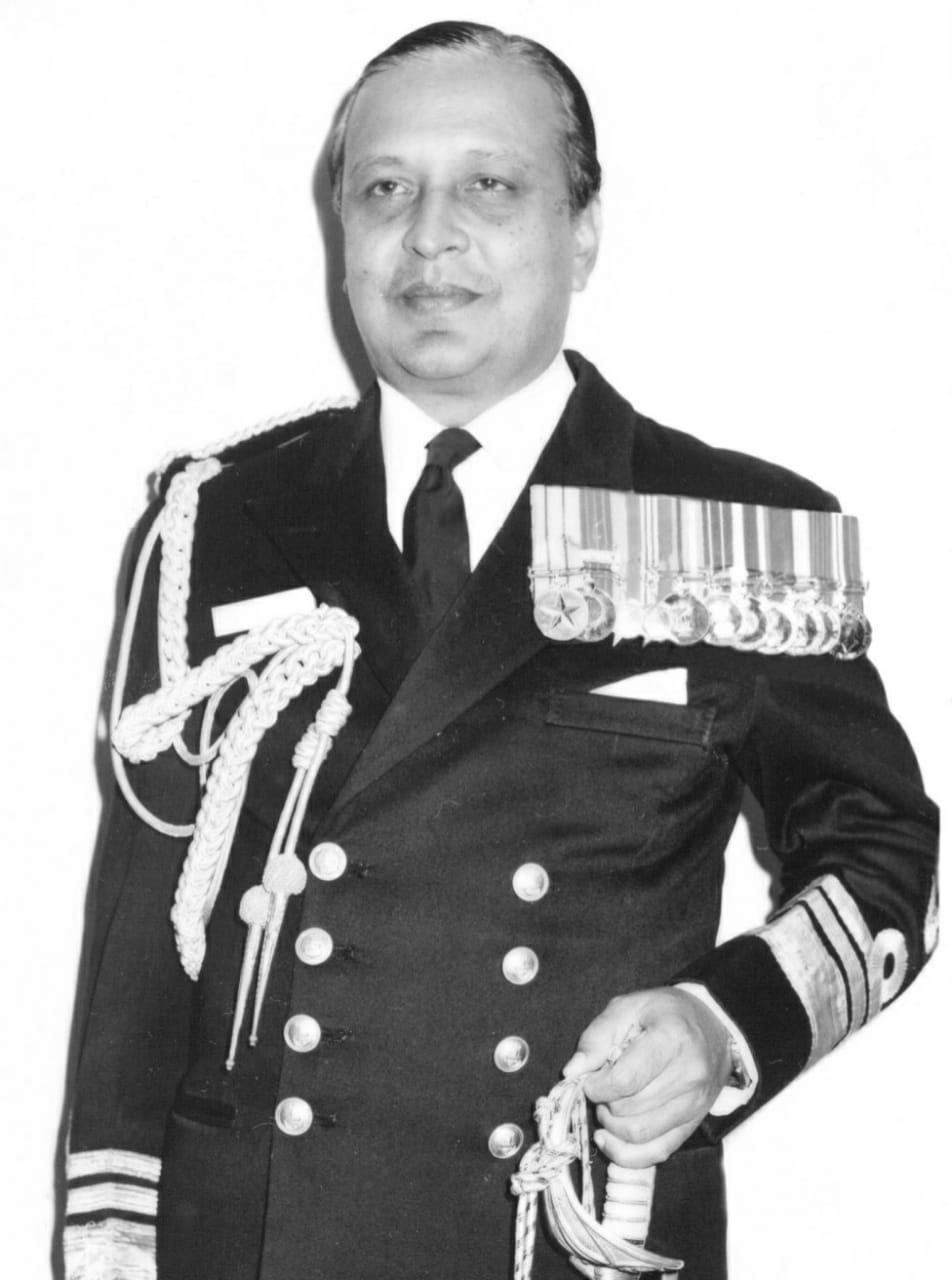
- Born: 22 June 1926; Bogra, Bengal Presidency, British India (now in Bangladesh)
- Died: 20 May 2013 (aged 86); Gurgaon, Haryana, India
- Military career
- Allegiance: British Raj; India
- Branch: Royal Indian Navy; Indian Navy
- Service years: 1946–1984
- Rank: Vice Admiral
- Nickname: Micky
- Service number: 00040-R
- Commands: Eastern Naval Command; Eastern Fleet; INS Vikrant; 16th Frigate Squadron; INS Brahmaputra (1957); INS Garuda; 22nd Destroyer Squadron; INS Godavari (D92); INAS 310; FRU
- Conflicts: World War II; Indo-Pakistani War of 1971
- Awards: Param Vishisht Seva Medal; Ati Vishisht Seva Medal

Vice Admiral Mihir Kumar 'Micky' Roy, PVSM, AVSM was a flag officer in the Indian Navy. He last served as the Flag Officer Commanding-in-Chief Eastern Naval Command (FOC-in-C ENC).

Born in a zamindari Bengali family, he joined the Royal Indian Navy in 1946. After four years of training, he transferred to the Indian Navy and was among the first officers to be sent to the United Kingdom to train as a naval aviator. From 1955 to 1957, he commanded the Fleet requirement unit, the first naval air unit. In 1961, he became the first commanding officer of the Indian Navy's first air-ASW naval air squadron INAS 310, a squadron formed to embark on India's first aircraft carrier - INS Vikrant. Promoted to the rank of commander, he commanded the Hunt-class destroyer INS Godavari (D92) and the 22nd destroyer squadron. He subsequently commanded the naval air station INS Garuda, the Leopard-class frigate INS Brahmaputra (1957) and the 16th frigate squadron.

During the Indo-Pakistani War of 1971, he was the Director of Naval Intelligence (DNI). As DNI, he was the architect of successful naval commando operations, for which he was awarded the Ati Vishisht Seva Medal. After attending the Royal College of Defence Studies, he served as the commanding officer of INS Vikrant and later the chief of staff of the Western Naval Command. Promoted to flag rank in 1976, he served as the Assistant Chief of Personnel at naval HQ before taking over command of the Eastern Fleet. From 1977 to 1979, he was the senior directing staff at the National Defence College. Promoted to Vice Admiral, he took over as the FOC-in-C ENC. He led the ENC for four years from 1980 to 1984. On retirement from the Navy, he was appointed the first Director-General of the Advanced Technology Vessel (ATV) project. The project was aimed at acquiring India's first nuclear submarine.

Regarded as a scholar, he was the first officer from the Indian Armed Forces to be selected as a Jawaharlal Nehru Fellow. He also wrote a well-researched book War in the Indian Ocean in 1995 and served as the editor of the Journal of the Society for Indian Ocean Studies, which he co-founded.

== Early life and education ==
Roy was born on 22 June 1926 in an aristocratic zamindari Bengali family in Bogura, Bengal Presidency. His father Bijoy Kumar Roy was an officer in the Imperial Forest Service, who retired as the Conservator of forests in the Madras Presidency. He grew up in Vellore, where he was schooled at the Voorhees College. He then attended the Presidency College, Chennai, where he obtained a Master of Arts honours degree in Economics and Political science. Growing up in Tamil Nadu, he spoke Tamil fluently. He planned to study accountancy in the United Kingdom, but changed his mind and appeared for the armed services exam. He stood first among those from Madras Presidency and joined the Royal Indian Navy (RIN) in 1946.

== Naval career ==
=== Early career ===
Joining the RIN as a cadet, Roy attended the Royal Naval College, Dartmouth. He trained on board the Hawkins-class cruiser HMS Frobisher (D81) which was converted into a training ship. He subsequently served on the King George V-class battleship HMS Duke of York (17) and was on board the battleship during the Home Fleet review on the River Clyde. He the transferred to the Algerine-class minesweeper HMS Mariner (J380), where he participated in operations clearing mines laid between Iceland and the USSR.

=== Post-Independence ===
After the Independence of India, Roy transferred to the Indian Navy. He earned his watchkeeping ticket on board the R-class destroyer INS Rajput (D141). He was promoted to lieutenant on 16 February 1951, and that year was among the first batch of five officers sent to the United Kingdom to train as naval aviators. A part of the No. 8 RN observer course, he stood first in flying and ground subjects and was awarded his wings on 12 May 1952 at RNAS St Merryn (HMS Vulture). He also received letters of commendation from the First Sea Lord and Chief of the Naval Staff, Admiral of the Fleet Rhoderick McGrigor. He attended the long photography course at RNAS Ford and the operational intelligence course at RAF Wyton before being sent on attachment to RNAS Eglinton (HMS Gannet). After his training, he returned to India and was part of the fledgling naval air arm. On 10 October 1953, the first President's fleet review took place at Bombay. A Short Sealand aircraft carried out a successful water landing after saluting then President, Dr. Rajendra Prasad. The aircraft was piloted by Lieutenant Commander Y. N. Singh with Roy as crew.

On 1 February 1955, Roy took command of the Fleet Requirement Unit (FRU) as its fourth commanding officer. The FRU was the first unit of the Indian Naval Air Arm which in 1959 was commissioned as INAS 550. Roy was in command of the FRU for two years until February 1957. He was promoted substantive lieutenant-commander on 16 February 1959. In early 1961, India's first aircraft carrier was acquired from the UK. INS Vikrant was commissioned on 4 March 1961 at 1000 hours by Vijaya Lakshmi Pandit, the High Commissioner of India to the United Kingdom. The Vikrant sailed from Belfast for Portsmouth in March 1961 and then to Portland for sea trials. Two aircraft squadrons were to be formed to embark on the carrier – the INAS 300 formed in the UK flying Hawker Sea Hawk jet fighters, and the INAS 310 formed in France flying Bréguet 1050 Alizé Anti-submarine warfare aircraft.

Roy was selected to be the commissioning commanding officer of INAS 310, nicknamed the Cobras. The squadron was commissioned on 21 March 1961 by the Indian Ambassador to France, Ali Yavar Jung in Hyères, France, on board the French aircraft carrier Arromanches. After the commissioning, Roy led the squadron in work-up and trials with the French Navy. In May, led by him, the squadron embarked on the Vikrant in Toulon, France. In August, INAS 300 also embarked in the English Channel. The squadrons were embarked on the carrier on its way home to India. Vikrant called on multiple ports on the way like Alexandria, Port Said and Aden, with INS Rajput (D141) as escort. On 3 November, Vikrant reached home waters off Bombay, where the two squadrons disembarked. Roy then took the squadron to INS Garuda in Cochin. He was in command till March 1962.

In April 1964, Roy was selected to attend the Defence Services Staff College in Wellington, and was promoted substantive commander on 30 June. After completing the course, he was appointed Captain of the 22nd Destroyer Squadron as well as the commanding officer of the lead destroyer of the squadron, INS Godavari (D92). Apart from Godavari, the squadron consisted of INS Gomati (D93) and INS Ganga (D94). On 8 August 1966, Roy took command of Naval air station INS Garuda. He commanded the station for three years until August 1969. He was promoted to the substantive rank of Captain during this tenure, on 30 June 1969. Roy was then appointed Captain of the 16th Frigate Squadron and the commanding officer of the lead frigate of the squadron, INS Brahmaputra. The squadron consisted of her sister ships INS Betwa (F139) and INS Beas (F137). In March 1970, Admiral Sardarilal Mathradas Nanda took over as the eighth Chief of the Naval Staff. Shortly thereafter, he picked Roy to be the next Director of Naval Intelligence (DNI) at Naval HQ. The naval intelligence directorate he headed had four wings and around 120 officers and men.

=== Indo-Pakistani War of 1971 ===
The Indo-Pakistani War of 1971 was sparked by the Bangladesh Liberation war, a conflict between the traditionally dominant West Pakistanis and the majority East Pakistanis. In 1970, East Pakistanis demanded autonomy for the state, but the Pakistani government failed to satisfy these demands and in early 1971, a demand for secession took root in East Pakistan. In March, the Pakistan Armed Forces launched a fierce campaign to curb the secessionists, the latter including soldiers and police from East Pakistan. Thousands of East Pakistanis died, and nearly ten million refugees fled to West Bengal, an adjacent Indian state. In April, India decided to assist in the formation of the new nation of Bangladesh.

In April 1971, Roy started building an underwater guerrilla force manned by "raw but physically strong and mentally stubborn Bangla Desh personnel to launch surface and sub surface raids on ports, shipping and inland waterways." He planned to set up a force of about 600 commandos which would complement the Indian Army's covert training of the Mukti Bahini. This force would have Bengali sailors who escaped from the Pakistani submarine PNS Mangro (S133) as the nucleus, trained by Indian naval officers and divers.

Roy's staff officer was Commander M. N. R. Samant who ran the operation on the ground. Two camps were set up at Plassey and Haldia – Camp 2 Plassey (C2P) and Camp 2 Haldia (C2H). The frogmen were trained rigorously. They were required to swim 12 miles (19 km) in complete darkness, breathing through a reed while manoeuvring neutrally buoyant limpet mines, attach the mines and swim away before the mines exploded. They concentrated on attacking ports, inland harbours, ferries, pontoons, and all types of vessels.

As Roy wrote later in his book, their aims were:

- to neutralise the main seaports of Chittagong on the Karnaphuli River and Chalna, Mangla, Khulna on the Pussur River so as to prevent supplies to support the Army being brought in by sea.
- to stop traditional exports of jute, tea, coir and
- to disrupt inland waterway systems and the river ports of Narayanganj, Daudkhandi, Chandpur and Barisal.

The naval commando operations were extremely successful. Overall, about 400 naval commandos and frogmen were trained. Along with a Mukti Bahini gunboat, they captured, sank or damaged about 15 Pakistani ships, 11 coasters, 7 gunboats, 11 barges, 2 tankers and 19 river craft. The frogmen sank or crippled over one lakh tons of shipping, immobilised jetties and wharves and blocked navigable channels. For these operations, Roy was awarded the Ati Vishisht Seva Medal on 26 January 1972. Commander M. N. R. Samant, Lieutenant Commander J. P. A. Noronha and Leading Seaman Chiman Singh were awarded the Maha Vir Chakra.

=== Post-war career ===
In September 1972, he was one of two officers from the armed forces to be selected to attend the Royal College of Defence Studies (RCDS) in London. He attended the course starting January 1973. On his return to India after graduating from RCDS, he was appointed the ninth commanding officer of INS Vikrant. He took command of the carrier on 3 January 1974, the first naval aviator to do so. He served as the flag captain to three fleet commanders of the Western Fleet – Rear Admirals Swaraj Parkash, N. P. Datta and Rustom K. S. Ghandhi. In late 1975, Roy led Vikrant which, accompanied by frigates INS Himgiri (F34), INS Trishul (F143) and INS Kirpan (F144), called on ports in the Persian Gulf. As the flagship, Vikrant flew the flag of the Flag Officer Commanding Western Fleet, Rear Admiral R. K. S. Ghandhi. After two years in command of the carrier, he relinquished command in February 1976, handing it over to another naval aviator Captain R. H. Tahiliani. He was then appointed Chief of Staff (COS) to the Flag Officer Commanding-in-Chief Western Naval Command, Vice Admiral Ronald Lynsdale Pereira, in the rank of Commodore.

=== Flag rank ===
After a short stint as COS of Western Naval Command, Roy was promoted to the acting rank of rear admiral on 21 June 1976 and appointed Assistant Chief of Personnel (ACOP). This appointment was that of an assistant Principal Staff Officer at Naval HQ. He served as the ACOP for a year before being appointed the sixth Flag Officer Commanding Eastern Fleet (FOCEF). Promoted substantive rear admiral on 1 March 1977, he took over from Rear Admiral D. S. Paintal on 10 June. In early 1978, he was appointed Senior Directing Staff (SDS) at the prestigious National Defence College (NDC) in New Delhi. In February that year, he relinquished command of the Eastern Fleet, handing it over to Rear Admiral Oscar Stanley Dawson. He served as the SDS at NDC for a year and a half till December 1979.

On 24 March 1980, Roy was appointed Flag Officer Commanding-in-Chief Eastern Naval Command (FOC-in-C ENC) at Visakhapatnam and promoted to vice-admiral with effect from 1 April 1980. He assumed command from Vice Admiral M. R. Schunker. In September that year, the Vamsadhara River flooded and caused a lot of destruction around Srikakulam. Roy led the ENC's efforts towards flood rescue and evacuation. The ENC set up an advance operational base in Srikakulam and dispatched naval doctors, divers and sailors for rescue operations. In 1981, he initiated the development of naval air stations in the ENC's area of responsibility. There was then just one helicopter flight in Visakhapatnam. Roy's efforts led to the construction of the naval air station in Arakkonam. INS Rajali was commissioned in March 1992 and has the longest military runway in Asia.

That same year, Roy was a part of a high-level technical team consisting of Director General Defence Research and Development Organisation (DRDO) Dr. Raja Ramanna, Dr. P. R. Dastidar of the Bhabha Atomic Research Centre (BARC), Vice Admiral B.R. Chowdhury and Commodore Vijai Singh Shekhawat. The team visited the USSR to study an offer from the Soviet Union to design and build a nuclear submarine. In March 1982, Roy led the command in naval and joint exercises Operation Eastwind off the Andaman and Nicobar Islands. He instituted the FOC-in-C East Rolling Trophy to be awarded to the pilot standing first in overall merit. On 26 January 1984, he was awarded the Param Vishisht Seva Medal for distinguished service of the most exceptional order. Roy had a long tenure as the FOC-in-C East, serving for a little over four years. After close to four decades in service, in April 1984, he retired from the Indian Navy after relinquishing command of the Eastern Naval Command, handing it over to Vice Admiral Jayant Ganpat Nadkarni.

== Advanced Technology Vessel ==
On retiring from the Navy, Roy was appointed the first Director General of the Advanced Technology Vessel project. The project was aimed at building India's first nuclear submarine. He held the rank of Secretary to the Government of India and reported to the Chairman of the DRDO. The project operated under the direct supervision of the Prime Minister. During his tenure, the Charlie-class submarine, Soviet submarine K-43, was leased to the Indian Navy. The submarine was rechristened INS Chakra and served in the Indian Navy from 1988 to 1991. As the DG, he also chaired the Joint Indo-Soviet Working Group (JISWOG). The ATV project delivered the first indigenous nuclear submarine when the lead-ship of the Arihant-class submarine, INS Arihant, was launched on 26 July 2009 and commissioned in August 2016.

== Later life ==
After his retirement, Roy was active in multiple projects and societies. He was a member of the Aeronautical Society, the Eastern Ghat Development Board, and President of the Andhra Pradesh Natural History Society. On 1 July 1984, he was appointed Captain Commandant of the executive branch, succeeding Vice Admiral R. K. S. Ghandhi. In 1987, he also co-founded the Society for Indian Ocean Studies (SIOS) with historians Saiyid Nurul Hasan and Satish Chandra. He also served as associate editor and later editor of the Journal of Indian Ocean Studies. He edited the journal for around twenty years until his demise. In 1989, he became the first from the Indian Armed Forces to be selected for the prestigious Jawaharlal Nehru Fellowship. He was also a Ford Foundation visiting fellow at the University of Illinois at Urbana–Champaign. In 1995, he wrote a book War in the Indian Ocean which is regarded as well-researched, well-documented and informative.

Roy died on 20 May 2013 at his home in Gurgaon, aged 87.

== Legacy ==
Roy has many firsts to his credit. He was the first observer of the Indian Navy and the first observer to rise to flag rank. He was the first to fly the Alizé on the deck of the aircraft carrier INS Vikrant and later the first naval aviator to command the carrier. He pioneered air-ASW in India as the first commanding officer of INAS 310. He was also regarded as the father of the Indian nuclear submarine program, as he was the first Director-General of the ATV project. He was also the first services officer to be selected as a Jawaharlal Nehru Fellow.

Roy is credited with seizing the initiative and planning underwater guerrilla operations behind enemy lines. His naval commando operations (X) are considered to be among the best planned and executed military operations in the world. The Observer school building at INS Garuda in Kochi is named Mihir Hall after Roy.

== Awards and decorations ==

Param Vishisht Seva Medal	Ati Vishisht Seva Medal	General Service Medal 1947	Samar Seva Star
Poorvi Star	Paschimi Star	Raksha Medal	Sangram Medal
Indian Independence Medal	25th Independence Anniversary Medal	30 Years Long Service Medal	20 Years Long Service Medal
	9 Years Long Service Medal	War Medal 1939–1945	

== Bibliography ==
- Singh, Satyindra (1991), Blueprint to bluewater: The Indian Navy, 1951–65, Lancer International, ISBN 978-8170621485
- Nanda, S. M. (2004), The man who bombed Karachi, HarperCollins Publishers India, ISBN 978-8172235628
- Roy, Mihir K. (1995), War in the Indian Ocean, Lancer Publishers & Distributors, ISBN 978-1-897829-11-0
- Samant, M. N. R.; Unnithan, Sandeep (2019), Operation X: The Untold Story of India's Covert Naval War in East Pakistan, HarperCollins, ISBN 978-9353570194
- Jacob, J. F. R. (1997), Surrender at Dacca: Birth of a Nation, Manohar Publishers, ISBN 978-8173041891
- Pasricha, Vinod (2010), Downwind, Four Green, Pashmira Publications, ISBN 978-8191000702
- Hiranandani, G. M. (2009), Transition to Guardianship: The Indian Navy 1991–2000, Lancer Publishers, ISBN 978-1-935501-26-8

Military offices
Preceded by Swaraj Parkash	Commanding Officer INS Vikrant; 1974-1976	Succeeded by R. H. Tahiliani
Preceded by D. S. Paintal	Flag Officer Commanding Eastern Fleet; 1977-1978	Succeeded by Oscar Stanley Dawson
Preceded by A. P. S. Bindra	Senior Directing Staff (Navy), National Defence College; 1978-1979	Succeeded by Jayant Ganpat Nadkarni
Preceded by M. R. Schunker	Flag Officer Commanding-in-Chief Eastern Naval Command; 1980–1984	Succeeded by Jayant Ganpat Nadkarni
