= Rustom K. S. Ghandhi =

Indian Navy Admiral

Vice Admiral R. K. S. Ghandhi PVSM, VrC
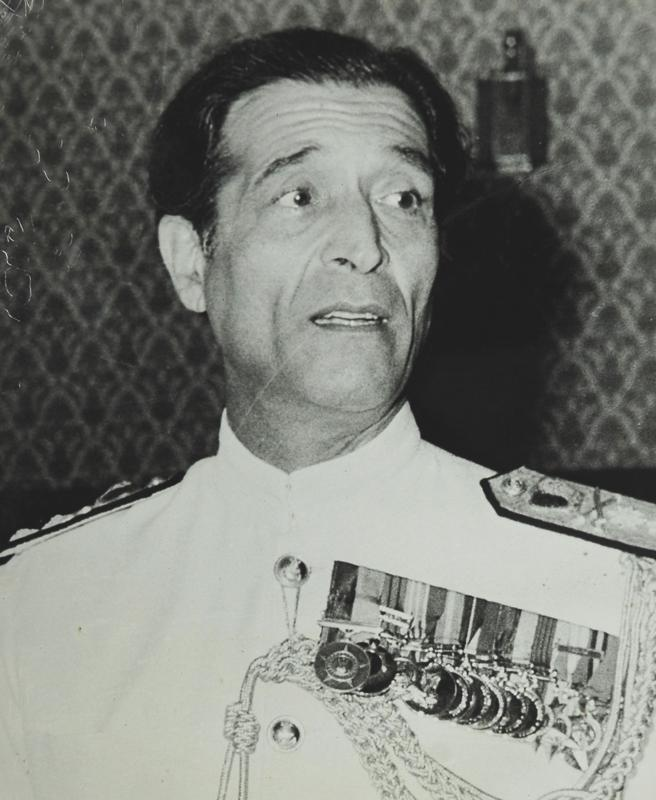
- Vice Admiral R. K. S. Ghandhi

5th Governor of Himachal Pradesh
- In office 17 April 1986 – 15 February 1990
- Preceded by: Prabodh Dinkarrao Desai (Additional charge)
- Succeeded by: S. M. H. Burney (Additional charge)

Personal details
- Born: 1 July 1924 Jubbulpore, Jubbulpore Division, Central Provinces, British India (present-day Jabalpur, Jabalpur district, Madhya Pradesh, India)
- Died: 23 December 2014 (aged 90) Mumbai, Maharashtra, India
- Awards: Param Vishisht Seva Medal; Vir Chakra

Military service
- Allegiance: British India; India
- Branch/service: Royal Indian Navy; Indian Navy
- Years of service: 1943 - 1979
- Rank: Vice Admiral
- Commands: Western Naval Command; Western Fleet; Eastern Fleet; INS Mysore; INS Khukri; INS Betwa; INS Kaveri
- Battles/wars: Annexation of Goa; Indo-Pakistani War of 1965; Indo-Pakistani War of 1971

Vice Admiral Rustom Khushro Shapoorjee 'Rusi' Ghandhi, PVSM, VrC (1 July 1924 – 23 December 2014) was a former flag officer in the Indian Navy. He last served as the Flag Officer Commanding-in-Chief Western Naval Command from 1977 to 1979. He is the only officer to have commanded ships in all wars and conflicts post Independence. He commanded the frigate INS Betwa (1959) during the Annexation of Goa, the destroyer INS Khukri (F149) during the Indo-Pakistani War of 1965 and the cruiser INS Mysore (C60) during the Indo-Pakistani War of 1971.

After he retired from the Indian Navy in 1979, he served as the chairman of the Shipping Corporation of India. In 1986, he was appointed the fifth governor of Himachal Pradesh. After the National Commission for Minorities was created, he served as a member of the commission.

== Early life and education ==
Ghandhi was the son of Khushro Shapur Ghandhi and Dina Dhunji Shah Amroliwalah. He was born in 1924 in Jabalpur, India. He graduated from St Joseph's College, Nainital, India, with an Intermediate Science degree in 1941. After a year of advanced studies at Allahabad University, he subsequently joined the Royal Indian Navy with a permanent commission as an officer cadet on 1 January 1943.

== Naval career ==
=== Early career ===
Ghandhi was promoted to midshipman on 1 September 1943. He served aboard the County-class cruiser HMS Suffolk (55). The Suffolk was deployed in the Atlantic hunting German raiders. He then served on board the W-class destroyer HMS Wakeful (1943) when it was deployed against the Japanese refineries in Indonesia. On 1 May 1945, he was promoted to Acting sub-lieutenant. He was in Tokyo Bay during the Surrender of Japan.

After the war, he returned to India and was appointed Flag lieutenant to the Commander-in-Chief, Royal Indian Navy Vice Admiral Sir Geoffrey Audley Miles. In February 1947, Lord Louis Mountbatten was appointed Governor-general of India. Ghandhi was appointed aide-de-camp (ADC) to the governor-general.

=== Post-Independence ===
As the ADC, Ghandhi was present with Governor-general Mountbatten at Viceroy's House on 15 August 1947 when India's independence was declared. He was promoted to acting lieutenant-commander on 30 June 1952, and in mid-1954 was selected to attend the Defence Services Staff College, Wellington. In 1957, he was appointed commanding officer of the Black Swan-class sloop INS Kaveri. He was promoted to commander on 31 December 1958.

=== Liberation of Goa ===
In 1961, he took command of the Leopard-class frigate INS Betwa (1959). He was in command of the Betwa and played a decisive role in "Operation Vijay", the 1961 Indian annexation of Goa which ended 451 years of Portuguese rule. Betwa was the senior ship during the naval battle at Mormugão Harbour. His Portuguese adversary, Captain António da Cunha Aragão, was in command of the destroyer NRP Afonso de Albuquerque, which was anchored off Mormugão Harbour.

In the ensuing battle, the Afonso de Albuquerque took a direct hit to its control tower, injuring its weapons officer, killing its radio officer and severely injuring its captain. Subsequently, the order was given to abandon ship, and the rest of the crew, along with their injured captain, disembarked directly onto the beach after setting fire to their ship. Following this, the captain was moved by car to the hospital at Panaji. The destroyer's crew surrendered formally along with the remaining Portuguese forces on 19 December 1961. As a gesture of goodwill, the commanders of INS Betwa and INS Beas later visited Captain Aragão as he lay recuperating in bed at Panjim, and presented him with a gift of brandy, chocolates, and dried fruit, since it was just before Christmas. In return, Captain Aragão gave Commander Ghandhi the keys to his cabin as a token of surrender. Commander Ghandhi also sent messages via England to inform Portugal that Captain Aragão was well.

Ghandhi was in command of the frigate for about two years, after which he was selected to attend the Naval War College in Newport, Rhode Island. After completing the course, he returned to India and was promoted to the acting rank of captain, on 31 August 1964. In 1965, he was appointed captain (F) of the 14th frigate squadron and commanding officer of the lead ship - the Blackwood-class frigate INS Khukri (F149). While in command of the squadron, he was promoted to the substantive rank of captain on 31 December 1966. In August 1967, he was selected to attend the National Defence College. The year-long course commenced in January 1968. After completing the course, Ghandhi moved to Naval HQ, having been appointed Director of Naval Operations. After a short stint, he took command of the Crown Colony-class cruiser INS Mysore (C60), in 1969.

=== Indo-Pakistani War of 1971 ===
At the outbreak of war, the Western Fleet was commanded by Rear Admiral Elenjikal Chandy Kuruvila. In mid 1971, The aircraft carrier INS Vikrant, along with the frigates INS Brahmaputra (1957) and INS Beas (1958) were moved from the Western Fleet to the Eastern Naval Command and formed the core of the newly-formed Eastern Fleet. INS Mysore thus became the flagship of the Western Fleet. Ghandhi was awarded the Vir Chakra for conspicuous gallantry for his role as flag captain of the western fleet. The citation for the Vir Chakra reads as follows:

Date of Award: 26 January 1971

CITATION

CAPTAIN RUSTOM KHUSHRO SHAPOORJEE GHANDHI

(00021-Y)

Captain Rustom Khushro Shapoorjee Ghandhi was the flag Captain of the Western Fleet during the operations against Pakistan in December 1971. Despite continuous threat of enemy air and submarine attacks, Captain Gandhi, through his inspiring leadership, kept the Units of the Western Fleet that were under his command threatening the approaches to Karachi continuously. It was as a result of this action and by the attacks carried out by these units off Karachi that the entry of ships into the port of Karachi was denied to the enemy. He thus contributed in no small measure to the success of the operations. Throughout, Captain Rustom Khushro Shapoorjee Ghandhi displayed gallantry, leadership and devotion to duty of a high order.

=== Post-war career ===
After the war, Ghandhi was appointed naval advisor (NA) to the high commissioner of India to the United Kingdom at India House, London. The high commissioners were Apa Pant and Braj Kumar Nehru during his tenure.

=== Flag rank ===
After a two year stint as NA in London, he was promoted to the acting rank of rear admiral and appointed flag officer commanding Eastern Fleet in January 1975. In October of the same year, he moved to Mumbai and took command of the Western Fleet. He is among the very few flag officers to have commanded both fleets of the Indian Navy.

In February 1976, Ghandhi relinquished command of the western fleet, handing over to Rear Admiral M. R. Schunker. He was promoted to the acting rank of vice admiral and moved to Naval HQ as chief of personnel (COP), taking over from Vice Admiral R. N. Batra. On 26 January 1977, he was awarded the Param Vishisht Seva Medal for distinguished service of the most exceptional order. After a year as COP, in April 1977, he was appointed flag officer commanding-in-chief Western Naval Command.

== Post-retirement ==
Upon retirement from the Indian Navy, Ghandhi enjoyed a short stint as technical consultant for the motion picture The Sea Wolves, and played a cameo role as the governor of Goa in it. He served as the captain commandant of the executive branch till 1984, handing over to Vice Admiral Mihir K. Roy. He was appointed chairman of the Shipping Corporation of India in 1981 and served in that capacity until 1986.

== Political career ==
From April 1986 to February 1990, while Rajiv Gandhi was Prime Minister of India, Ghandhi served as Governor of the State of Himachal Pradesh, residing with Mrs. Ghandhi at Raj Bhavan in Shimla. In addition to governmental duties, the couple made many improvements to Raj Bhavan, including a complete restoration of the billiard room and the Durbar Hall, as well as the construction of a gazebo on the premises. Following his governorship, Ghandhi served as a Member of the National Commission for Minorities from 1993 to 1996.

== Personal life ==
Ghandhi was married to Khorshed "Bubbles" Kharegat (deceased 2011), daughter of Sir Peroz and Lady Kharegat, née Dadabhoy, on 1 January 1949, and had three children, Sandy, Yasmine and Delna. He was the oldest of five brothers, the others being Dhun, Sorab, Burz and Jamshed.

== Death ==
Ghandhi died peacefully in his home in Navy Nagar of Colaba, Mumbai on 23 December 2014, aged 90, and was buried in the Arabian Sea on 27 December 2014 from INS Vipul.

Military offices
Preceded by Ronald Lynsdale Pereira	Flag Officer Commanding Eastern Fleet; 1974–1975	Succeeded by V. E. C. Barboza
Preceded by N. P. Datta	Flag Officer Commanding Western Fleet; 1975-1976	Succeeded by M. R. Schunker
Preceded by R N Batra	Chief of Personnel; 1976-1977	Succeeded by Swaraj Parkash
Preceded by Ronald Lynsdale Pereira	Flag Officer Commanding-in-Chief Western Naval Command; 1977–1979	Succeeded by V. E. C. Barboza
Government offices
Preceded by Krishan Dev	Chairman and Managing Director, Shipping Corporation of India; 1981–1985	Succeeded by L. M. S. Rajwar
Political offices
Preceded by Prabodh Dinkarrao Desai (additional charge)	Governors of Himachal Pradesh; 1986–1990	Succeeded by S. M. H. Burney (additional charge)
