= Swaraj Parkash =

Indian Navy Officer (1923–2004)

Vice Admiral Swaraj Parkash PVSM, MVC, AVSM
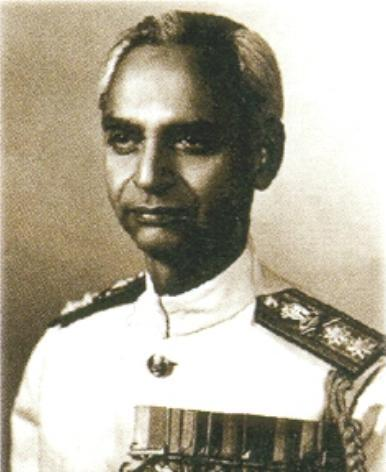
- Born: 3 September 1923; Jullundur, Punjab Province, British Raj (now in Punjab, India)
- Died: 20 January 2004 (aged 80); New Delhi, India
- Military career
- Allegiance: British India (1943–1947); India (from 1947)
- Branch: Royal Indian Navy; Indian Navy; Indian Coast Guard
- Service years: 1943–1982
- Rank: Vice Admiral
- Commands: Indian Coast Guard; Eastern Naval Command; Western Fleet; INS Vikrant; INS Delhi (C74); INS Khukri (F149); INS Betwa (1959); INS Krisna(U46)
- Conflicts: World War II; Indo-Pakistani War of 1971
- Awards: Param Vishisht Seva Medal; Maha Vir Chakra; Ati Vishisht Seva Medal

Vice Admiral Swaraj Parkash, PVSM, MVC, AVSM (3 September 1923 – 20 January 2004) was a Flag officer in the Indian Navy. He was the Captain of the aircraft carrier INS Vikrant during the Indo-Pakistani War of 1971 for which he was decorated with India's second-highest military decoration, the Maha Vir Chakra. He later served as the second Director General of the Indian Coast Guard from 1980 to 1982.

== Early life ==
Parkash was born on 3 September 1923, to Pandit Milkhi Ram in Jalandhar Cantonment in the Punjab Province. He joined the Royal Indian Naval Reserve in December 1942 as a Midshipman.

== Naval career ==
=== Early career ===
As a midshipman, he served on the auxiliary patrol vessel HMIS Laxmi. Parkash was commissioned as an acting Sub-lieutenant on 3 September 1943. He then served on another auxiliary patrol vessel HMIS St. Antony. Towards the end of the war, in 1945, he commanded the Basset-class trawler HMIS Travancore.

=== Post-Independence ===
In 1949, he was selected to attend the Long Navigation and Direction course and embarked for the United Kingdom. He served as the flag lieutenant to the Commander-in-Chief, Royal Indian Navy, Vice Admiral Sir William Edward Parry. He specialised in navigation and direction. He was promoted to the acting rank of Lieutenant Commander in December 1952. He attended the Defence Services Staff College, Wellington in 1955. He later served as the Directing Staff at the college.

Parkash commanded the Black Swan-class sloop INS Krisna, the Leopard-class frigate INS Betwa (1959), the Blackwood-class frigate INS Khukri (F149) and the Leander-class cruiser INS Delhi (C74). In July 1963, he took over as the Chief of Staff to Commodore-in-Charge Cochin (COMCHIN) Commodore G. S. Kapoor. In 1965, he attended the Naval War College at Newport, Rhode Island in the United States. He was promoted to the substantive rank of Captain on 30 June 1967.

He also served as the Naval attaché to the Ambassador of India to USSR at the Embassy of India in Moscow. He subsequently moved to Naval headquarters and took over as the Director of the Submarine arm. He was awarded the Ati Vishisht Seva Medal on 26 January 1971.

=== Indo-Pakistani War of 1971 ===
The Indo-Pakistani War of 1971 was sparked by the Bangladesh Liberation war, a conflict between the traditionally dominant West Pakistanis and the majority East Pakistanis. In 1970, East Pakistanis demanded autonomy for the state, but the Pakistani government failed to satisfy these demands and, in early 1971, a demand for secession took root in East Pakistan. In March, the Pakistan Armed Forces launched a fierce campaign to curb the secessionists, the latter including soldiers and police from East Pakistan. Thousands of East Pakistanis died, and nearly ten million refugees fled to West Bengal, an adjacent Indian state. In April, India decided to assist in the formation of the new nation of Bangladesh.

Parkash took command of the flagship of the Navy, the aircraft carrier INS Vikrant before the outbreak of the war. The ship was part of the Western Fleet. In mid 1971, the Vikrant, along with her escorts, the frigates INS Brahmaputra and INS Beas were moved from the Western Fleet to the Eastern Naval Command. Thus, INS Vikrant became the flagship of the Eastern Fleet.

The Vikrant, commanded by Parkash formed the core of the strike force of the Eastern Fleet. Alizé and Hawker Sea Hawk aircraft from the Vikrant and the ships of the fleet bombarded Chittagong and Cox's Bazar. The air strikes of INS Vikrant resulted in the sinking or rendering useless 11 merchant ships totalling 56914 tons. The newly-refitted submarine of the Pakistan Navy, PNS Ghazi set out to hunt the Vikrant, but it was the professional skill and strategic manoeuvres which foiled the attempts.

Parkash was decorated with the Maha Vir Chakra for his command of the Vikrant. The citation for the Maha Vir Chakra reads as follows:

Gazette Notification: 18 Pres/72,12-2-72

CITATION

CAPTAIN SWARAJ PARKASH, AVSM

(00022-Z)

Captain Swaraj Parkash Commanded INS VIKRANT which was the nucleus of the Naval interdiction and strike force operating against the enemy in the Bay of Bengal. Throughout the period of those operations, the ship was operating in most hazardous waters and was the principal target both for the enemy Submarines and Aircraft. With indomitable spirit, he launched ceaseless offensive operations against the enemy. The successful air strikes from the VIKRANT had devastating effect on Ports all along the Bangladesh coast and completely denied the enemy the use of sea and island waterways. The complete supremacy of our Naval force symbolized by the VIKRANT paralyzed the enemy, shattered his morale and considerably expedited the enemy’s capitulation in the Eastern Theatre.

Captain Swaraj Parkash displayed conspicuous gallantry inspiring leadership, professional skill and devotion to duty in keeping with the highest traditions of the Indian Navy.

=== Flag rank ===
After the war, in 1973, Parkash was promoted to the rank of Rear Admiral and appointed Deputy Chief of the Naval Staff (DCNS). After a short stint, he assumed command of the Western Fleet as Flag Officer Commanding Western Fleet in the rank of Rear Admiral. He subsequently moved back to Naval HQ as DCNS where he served for two years.

On 2 April 1976, he was promoted to the acting rank of Vice Admiral and was appointed Flag Officer Commanding-in-Chief Eastern Naval Command. He relinquished command of the Eastern navy in 1977, handing over to his former Fleet Commander during the war, Rear Admiral S H Sarma. Parkash subsequently moved to Naval HQ as took over as Chief of Personnel (COP).

Parkash was awarded the Param Vishisht Seva Medal on 26 January 1978. After serving as COP for about two years, Parkash was appointed the 6th Vice Chief of the Naval Staff, the second senior-most position of the Navy, succeeding Vice Admiral Ronald Lynsdale Pereira. He relinquished office of VCNS on 31 March 1980.

=== Director General Indian Coast Guard ===
The Indian Coast Guard came into being on 19 August 1978. The new service was to function under the overall command and control of a Director general. On 1 April 1980, Parkash took over as the second Director General of the Indian Coast Guard (DGICG), succeeding Vice Admiral V. A. Kamath. He served as the DGICG for two years, before retiring.

== Later life ==
Parkash retired on 31 March 1982. He died in New Delhi on 20 January 2004, at the age of 80.

== Bibliography ==
- Chakravorty, B.C. (1995), Stories of heroism: PVC & MVC winners, Allied Publishers, ISBN 978-8170235163
- Krishnan, Nilakanta (2011), A Sailor's story, Punya Pub, ISBN 978-8189534141
- Sarma, S H (2001), My years at sea, Lancer Publishers & Distributors, ISBN 978-8170621218

Military offices
Preceded by S. L. Sethi	Commanding Officer INS Vikrant; 1971–1973	Succeeded by M. K. Roy
New title Appointment created	Deputy Chief of the Naval Staff; 1973–1973	Succeeded by N. P. Datta
Preceded by Kirpal Singh	Flag Officer Commanding Western Fleet; 1973–1974	Succeeded by N. P. Datta
Preceded by N. P. Datta	Deputy Chief of the Naval Staff; 1974–1976	Succeeded by N. P. Datta
Preceded by K. L. Kulkarni	Flag Officer Commanding-in-Chief Eastern Naval Command; 1976–1977	Succeeded by S. H. Sarma
Preceded by Rustom K. S. Ghandhi	Chief of Personnel; 1977–1979	Succeeded by Manohar Prahlad Awati
Preceded by Ronald Lynsdale Pereira	Vice Chief of the Naval Staff; 1979–1980	Succeeded by M. R. Schunker
Preceded by V. A. Kamath	Director General of the Indian Coast Guard; 1980–1982	Succeeded by M. R. Schunker
