= S. H. Sarma =

Indian military officer (1922–2022)

Vice Admiral S H Sarma PVSM
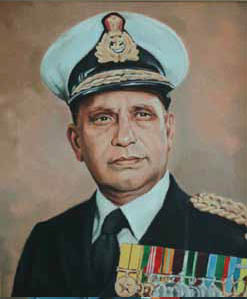
- Sarma as Commandant, NDC
- Born: 1 December 1922; Orissa, British Raj (present day Odisha)
- Died: 3 January 2022 (aged 99); Bhubaneswar, Odisha, India
- Military career
- Allegiance: British Raj; India
- Branch: Royal Indian Navy; Indian Navy
- Service years: 1942–1978
- Rank: Vice Admiral
- Commands: Eastern Naval Command; Eastern Fleet; INS Mysore (C60); INS Venduruthy; 16 Frigate Squadron; INS Brahmaputra (1957); INS Khukri (F149)
- Conflicts: World War II; Indo-Pakistani War of 1971
- Awards: Param Vishisht Seva Medal

Vice Admiral Sree Harilal Sarma, PVSM (1 December 1922 – 3 January 2022) was an Indian Navy admiral who served as Flag Officer Commanding Eastern Fleet (FOCEF) during the Indo-Pakistani War of 1971. He later served as the Flag Officer Commanding-in-Chief Eastern Naval Command from 1 March 1977 to 2 February 1978.

== Early life ==
Sarma was born on 1 December 1922, in the Bihar and Orissa Province, in a large well-to-do family, the eldest of nine children. His father, Narsinga Panda, was a sub-registrar in the Bihar and Orissa Province government. He spent the first ten years with his uncle and aunt who did not have children, before moving to his parents, in 1932.

The Indian Mercantile Marine Training Ship (IMMTS) Dufferin was established in 1927 to train young men for India's marine service. In mid-1936, Sarma appeared for the all-India competitive examination in Calcutta. Successful in the examination, he sat for the interview in Bombay later that year.

== Naval career ==
=== Dufferin and Mercantile marine ===
Sarma joined the Dufferin in January 1937. A good student, he was awarded the Viceroy's gold medal for the best all-round cadet, the Lawrence and Mayo prize for navigation and the Bombay Port Trust scholarship, when he graduated in December 1939. As the gold medal winner, he had offers from the Peninsular and Oriental Steam Navigation Company, British India Steam Navigation Company and the Scindia Steam Navigation Company Ltd. He chose to join the British India Steam Navigation Company in February 1940 as a cadet. He sailed on ships, voyaging in the Arabian Sea, the Bay of Bengal and to Penang, Singapore, Java and Hong Kong. At Hong Kong, his ship MV Orna was converted for war needs and sailed for the Mediterranean, carrying troops and war supplies. In April 1942, he was transferred to SS Indora in Calcutta. Later that year, he obtained the second mate's certificate of competency.

=== World War II ===
On 16 December 1942, as soon as he turned twenty, Sarma joined the Royal Indian Naval Reserve (RINR), and was commissioned as a sub-lieutenant. After a short training, in April 1943, he was posted to the auxiliary patrol vessel HMIS Rukmavati as its navigating officer. The ship sailed from Bombay to Calcutta and then to Cox's Bazar, patrolling the coast. In August that year, he was transferred to the Bangor-class minesweeper HMIS Kumaon. She was assigned escort duties and minesweeping operations between Bombay and the Persian Gulf. On 1 June 1944, Sarma was promoted to temporary lieutenant.

After Victory over Japan Day in August 1945, Kumaon was made a part of the 37th Minesweeping Flotilla and assigned minesweeping duties in the Strait of Malacca and the Singapore Strait. In September, Sarma and Kumaon participated in Operation Zipper and was present in Singapore during the Operation Tiderace theJapanese surrender ceremony. In early 1946, the 56th Services Selection Board was set up at Lonavla to screen the RINR and Royal Indian Naval Volunteer Reserve (RINVR) officers for a permanent commission in the Royal Indian Navy.

In early 1946, Sarma was given his first command – a MMS-class minesweeper MMS 154. He was in command of the vessel during the Royal Indian Navy mutiny. In August that year, he was transferred to the Bangor-class minesweeper HMIS Rajputana which was part of the 37th Minesweeping Flotilla and performed minesweeping operations in the Andaman and Nicobar Islands.

=== Post-Independence ===
Immediately after the Independence of India, Sarma was selected to attend the Navigation and Direction (ND) course at the Royal Navy School of Navigation, HMS Dryad, then based at the Southwick House, where he specialised in navigation. After completing the course, where he stood second, he returned to India on the Black Swan-class sloop HMIS Cauvery. He was appointed Staff Officer (Security) at Naval headquarters. He worked under two Chiefs of Staff to the Commander-in-Chief, Royal Indian Navy – Commodores M. H. St. L. Nott and Ajitendu Chakraverti. In January 1949, he was posted to the newly established Joint Services Wing (JSW), Dehradun. He served as a divisional officer of the first and second courses of the JSW.

In early 1951, he was transferred to the flagship of the Navy, the Leander-class cruiser, INS Delhi. After a short stint, he was appointed executive officer of the training ship INS Tir. He was promoted to the acting rank of lieutenant commander on 31 December 1951. In 1952, to commemorate the Coronation of Elizabeth II, a massive Coronation review of the fleet was held at Portsmouth. The flagship, Delhi, destroyer INS Ranjit and INS Tir represented India at the review. A naval armada consisting of ships from the Indian Navy, Royal Navy, Royal Australian Navy and the Royal New Zealand Navy sailed from Portsmouth to Gibraltar. The fleet carried out exercises along the way and was under the command of Lord Mountbatten. Subsequently, the Indian ships continued exercising with the Mediterranean Fleet. They sailed from Gibraltar to Malta, the Greek islands and to Istanbul.

Sarma was promoted to substantive lieutenant-commander on 1 June 1953. In 1954, he was appointed Officer-in-charge of the Navigation and Direction School in Cochin, the youngest incumbent. He also dual-hatted as the Staff Officer Operations (SO Ops) to the Commodore-in-Charge Cochin (COMCHIN) Commodore B.S. Soman. In August 1956, Sarma was selected to attend the Royal Naval College, Greenwich. He completed the Staff college course in April 1957 and was slated to take command of the Blackwood-class frigate INS Khukri which was under construction. Since the commissioning was delayed by a few months, his appointment was cancelled and he was asked to return to India. He was posted as Staff Officer (Operations) to the Commodore-in-Charge Bombay (COMBAY) Rear Admiral B. S. Soman. Sarma was promoted to the substantive rank of commander on 31 December 1957, at the time the youngest Commander in the Navy, after superseding about fifty officers. In early 1958, Sarma was appointed the commissioning commanding officer of Khukri. She was under construction in the Isle of Wight and commissioned on 16 July 1958. He sailed the ship down to India as her first commanding officer. He also led the ship in intensive anti-submarine exercises in Malta.

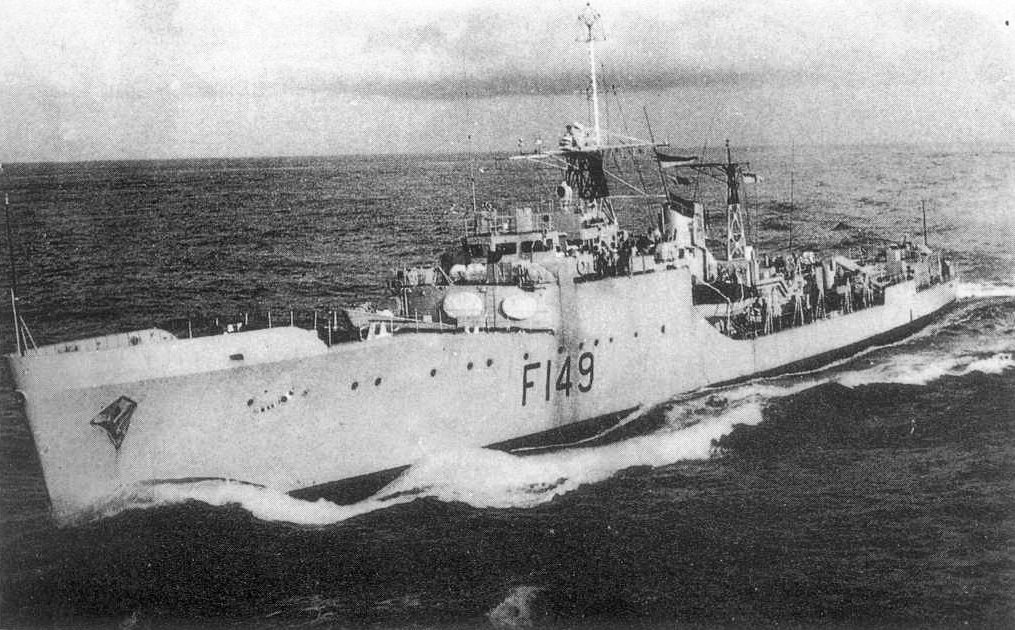
INS Khukri, the frigate which Sarma commissioned as its first CO.

In June 1959, after eighteen months in command of Khukri, Sarma was appointed Commander (executive officer) of the new flagship of the Navy – the Fiji-class cruiser, INS Mysore, commanded by Captain Sourendra Nath Kohli. He succeeded Commander K. M. Nanavati in the aftermath of K. M. Nanavati v. State of Maharashtra. During this tenure, Mysore participated in two joint exercises off Trincomalee (JET) and numerous port visits flying the flag of the Flag Officer Commanding Indian Fleet Rear Admiral Ajitendu Chakraverti. In July 1960, Sarma was appointed the Deputy Naval Adviser to the High Commissioner of India to the United Kingdom at India House, London. The High Commissioner then was Vijaya Lakshmi Pandit. It was during this time that India's first aircraft carrier INS Vikrant was commissioned in Belfast. After a three-year stint as Deputy naval adviser, Sarma was promoted to captain on 31 December 1964 and was appointed commanding officer of the frigate INS Brahmaputra. He also commanded the 16th frigate squadron comprising the ships INS Brahmaputra (1957), INS Beas (F37) and INS Betwa (F39) from 1964 to 1965.

In mid-1965, Sarma was posted as the Chief of Staff Southern Naval Area, and in February 1966, took over as the commanding officer of the largest training establishment of the Indian Navy, INS Venduruthy. In August 1967, he was selected to attend the National Defence College (NDC), New Delhi. Sarma declined the nomination to attend the NDC, continuing as CO INS Venduruthy until late 1968. After commanding Venduruthy for three years, he was appointed commanding officer of INS Mysore on 16 December 1968. Under his command, INS Mysore won the Western Fleet Sailing Regatta in 1969. He also filled in as the Chief of Staff to the Flag Officer Commanding-in-Chief Western Naval Command, Vice Admiral Nilakanta Krishnan, an appointment he assumed full-time in August 1970. Sarma was promoted to acting rear admiral and appointed Senior Directing Staff (SDS) at the National Defence College (NDC), New Delhi on 6 January 1971. He served as SDS at the NDC only for a few months, until September.

=== Indo-Pakistani War of 1971 ===
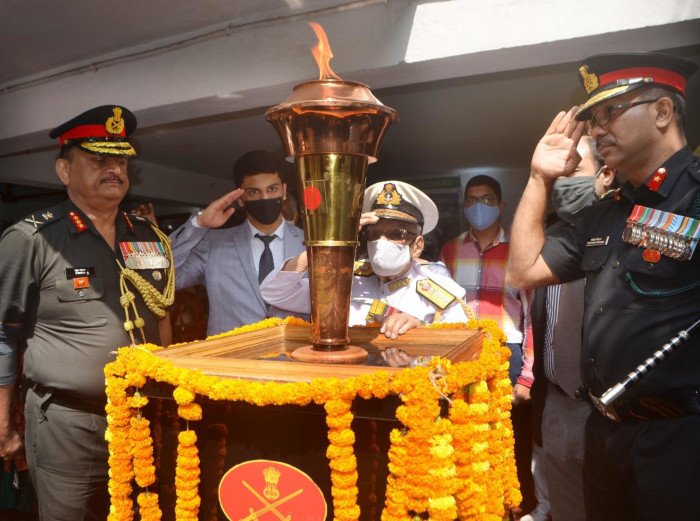
99 year-old VAdm Sarma salutes the Golden Victory Flame at his home in Odisha on the 50th anniversary of Vijay Diwas.

The Indo-Pakistani War of 1971 was caused by the Bangladesh Liberation war, a conflict between the traditionally dominant West Pakistanis and the majority East Pakistanis. In 1970, East Pakistanis demanded autonomy for the state, but the Pakistani government failed to satisfy these demands and, in early 1971, a demand for secession took root in East Pakistan. In March, the Pakistan Armed Forces began a campaign to repress the secessionists, the latter including soldiers and police from East Pakistan. Thousands of East Pakistanis died, and nearly ten million refugees fled to West Bengal, an adjacent Indian state. In April, India decided to assist in the formation of the new nation of Bangladesh.

In September 1971, Sarma was summoned by the Chief of the Naval Staff, Admiral S. M. Nanda who told him that he was to move to Visakhapatnam and take up command of the yet-to-be-formed Eastern Fleet. The two-fleet concept of the Navy came into force with the constitution of the Eastern Fleet on 1 November 1971. Rear Admiral Sarma took over as the Founding Flag Officer Commanding Eastern Fleet (FOCEF). In mid 1971, The aircraft carrier Vikrant, along with the frigates INS Brahmaputra and Beas were moved from the Western Fleet to the Eastern Naval Command. Vikrant became the flagship of the new fleet.

According to Sarma, the tasks of the Eastern Fleet were:

- To seek and destroy enemy naval units at sea
- To destroy his bases so that enemy naval units could not get shore support
- To establish a blockade off the East Pakistani coast
- To establish contraband control

The Eastern Fleet blockaded the ports of East Pakistan. Alizé and Sea Hawk aircraft from Vikrant and the ships of the fleet bombarded Chittagong and Cox's Bazar. The air strikes of Vikrant resulted in the sinking or rendering useless 11 merchant ships totalling 56,914 GRT. The Eastern Fleet also enforced contraband control until making an amphibious landing to cut off the land escape routes into Burma. After the surrender of Pakistan, in early 1972, Sarma led the fleet in minesweeping operations to make the Port of Chittagong operational.

For his command of the Eastern Fleet in the Indo-Pakistani War, Sarma was decorated with the Param Vishisht Seva Medal (PVSM) on 26 January 1972. The citation for the PVSM reads as follows:

CITATION

CAPTAIN (ACTING REAR ADMIRAL) SREE HARILAL SARMA

Flag Officer Commanding Eastern Fleet

Acting Rear Admiral S H Sarma, Flag Officer Commanding Eastern Fleet, the operational commander of all Indian naval forces in the Eastern Sector was responsible for safe-guarding the whole of Eastern seaboard from enemy attacks, to ensure complete blockade of the enemy held ports in Bangladesh. The officer conducted these operations with exemplary vigour, single mindedness of purpose and meticulous attention which resulted in the systematic disintegration and decimation of Pakistani Naval forces in the East and assured complete safety to the Indian Merchant shipping in the area. The Carrier borne forces under his command continuously attacked heavily defended enemy ports, inland waterways and hinterland causing serious damage to vital installations and seriously impairing the enemy's ability to continue to fight. He has displayed outstanding leadership and ability in the conduct of his duties as Flag Officer Commanding Eastern Fleet.

=== Post-war ===
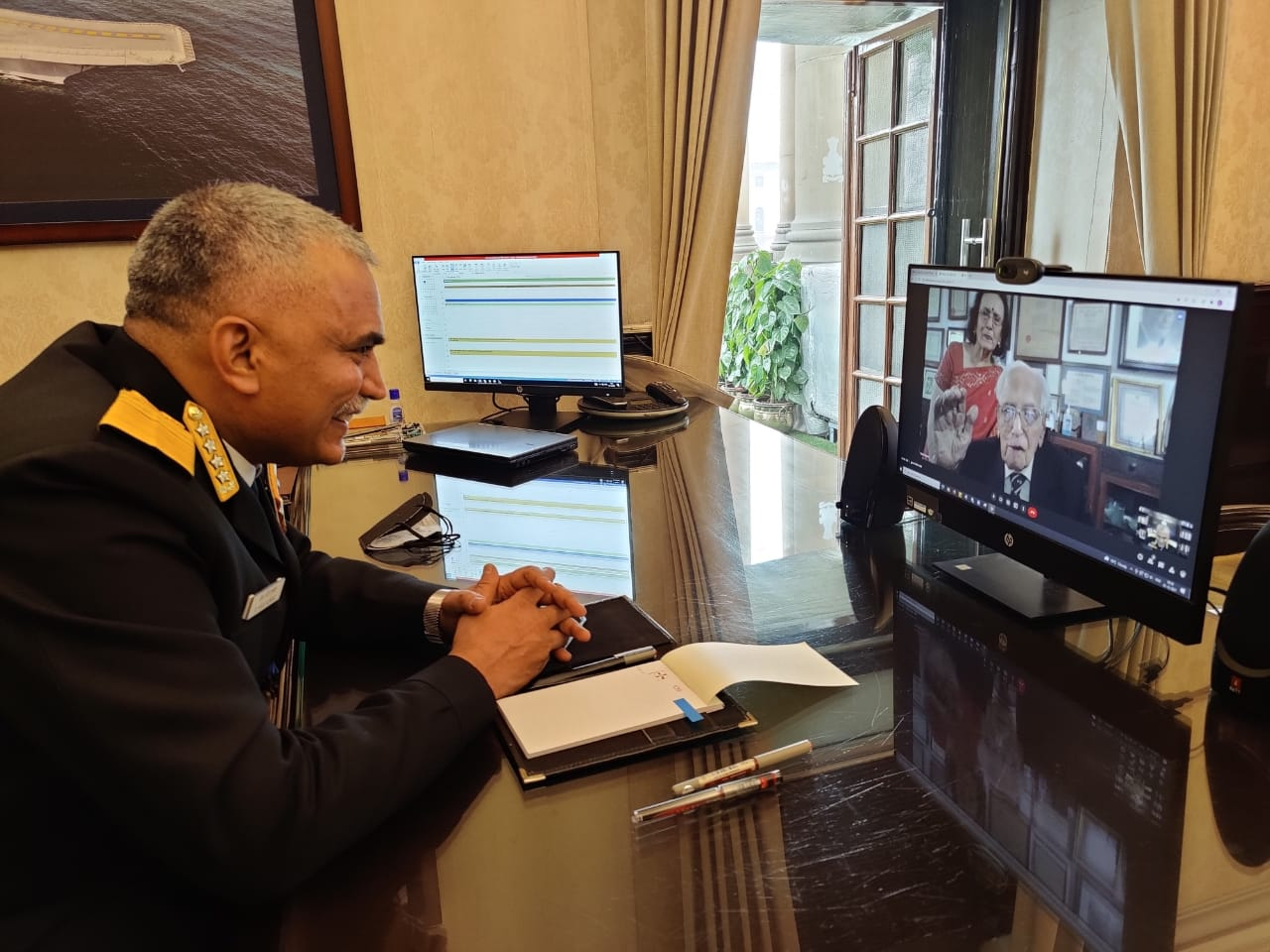
Admiral R. Hari Kumar, Chief of the Naval Staff, congratulates Vice Admiral Sarma on his 99th birthday.

After commanding the Eastern Fleet for about two years, Sarma was appointed Director General Naval Dockyard Expansion Scheme (DG-NDES) in 1973, taking over from Rear Admiral P. S. Mahindroo. He was promoted to substantive rear admiral on 1 March of the same year. He then served as the Flag Officer Commanding Southern Naval Area from 1973 to 1975. On 7 January 1975, he was promoted to vice admiral and took over as the Commandant of the National Defence College on 8 January 1975. After a two-year stint as Commandant NDC, he took over as the Flag Officer Commanding-in-Chief Eastern Naval Command.

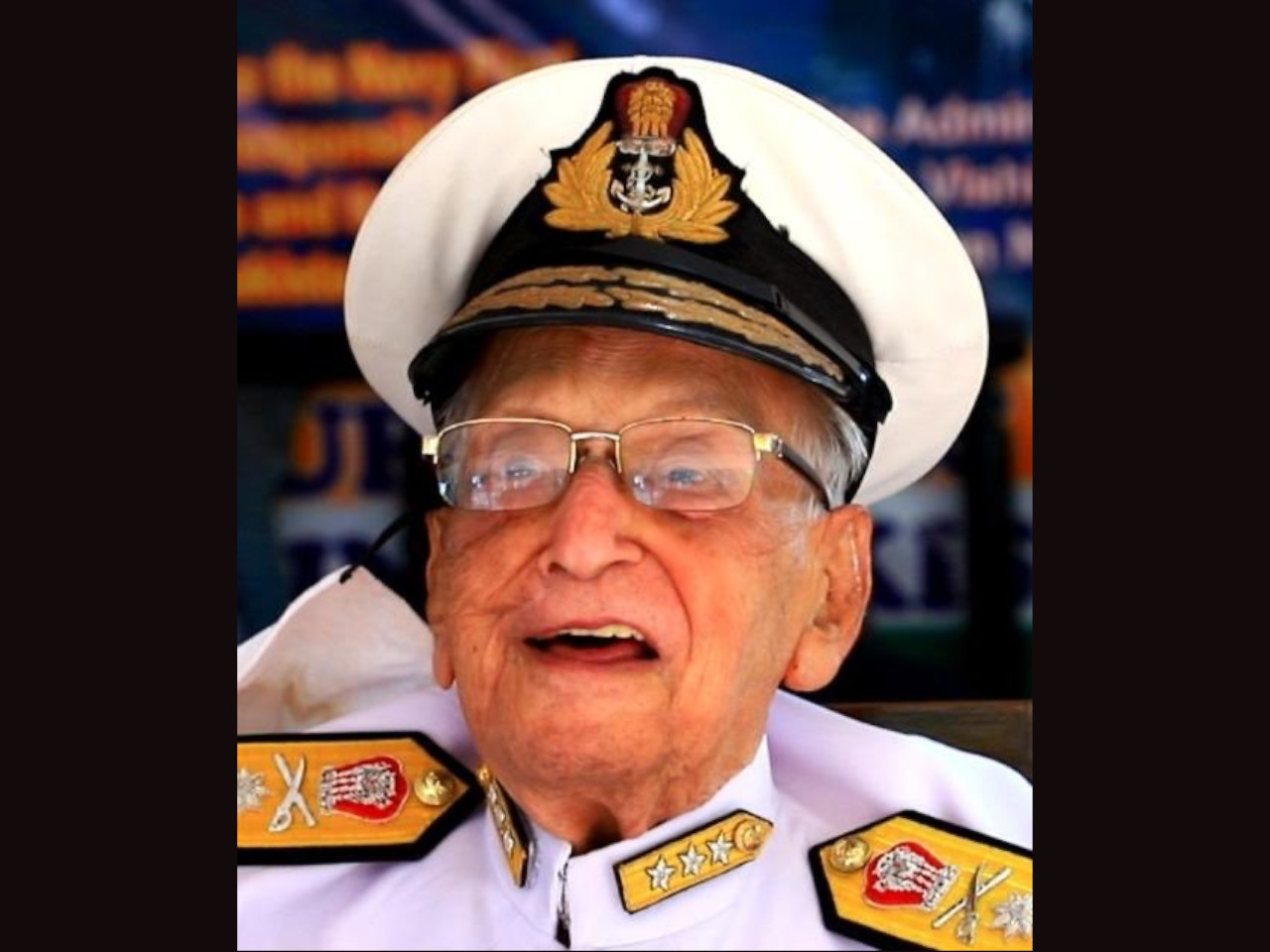
Vice Admiral Sarma wearing his naval uniform on his 99th birthday.

After commanding the Eastern Naval Command for a year, Sarma retired on 2 February 1978.

== Later life, death and legacy ==
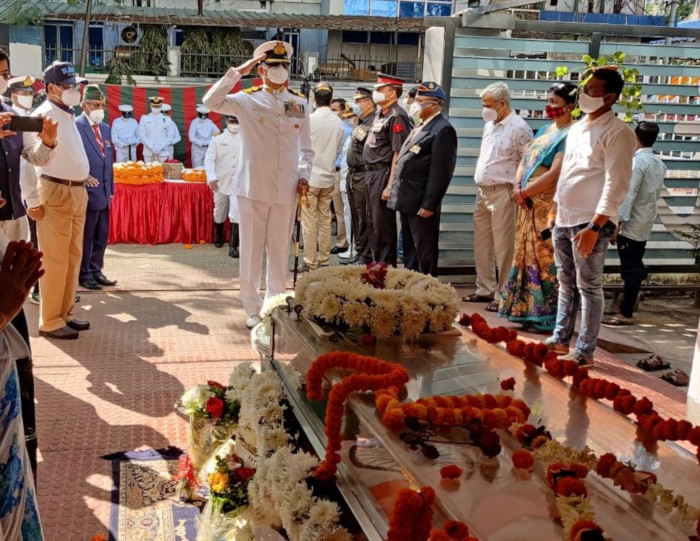
Commodore N.P. Pradeep, Naval Officer in Charge (Odisha), pays homage at Vice Admiral Sarma's funeral ceremony.

Post-retirement, Sarma wrote his autobiography, My Years at Sea, which he released in book format in 2017. On 14 January 2020, he was present at Odisha's fourth annual Armed Forces Veterans' Day and Ex-Servicemen Sammelan, during which he presented Chief Minister Naveen Patnaik with a bouquet. On 18 December 2020, Sarma was felicitated by eminent citizens of Odisha for his role in the Indo-Pakistani War of 1971. To inaugurate the "Swarnim Vijay Varsh" 50th anniversary commemoration of the 1971 Indo-Pakistani War, four "victory flames" were lit by Prime Minister Narendra Modi from the eternal flame at the National War Memorial on 16 December 2020. These victory flames were despatched to the four cardinal directions of the country, with one flame being sent to Sarma's home in recognition of his service.

On 13 December 2021, Sarma travelled to Delhi, where he laid a wreath at the National War Memorial on behalf of the Indian Navy, and also wrote a message in the electronic visitors' book there. On 14 December, he and other veterans were felicitated by Defence Minister Rajnath Singh at the New Delhi Cantonment. On 16 December, Sarma was honoured by Chief of the Naval Staff R. Hari Kumar and other senior naval officers for his service as the first Flag Officer Commanding Eastern Fleet and for his crucial role in the 1971 naval war.

Sarma returned to Bhubaneswar on 17 December, where from 22 December he was hospitalized in critical condition. He died on 3 January 2022, at the age of 99. On the first anniversary of his death, the Odisha Chapter of the Navy Foundation instituted the VAdm SH Sarma Memorial Seminar.

== See also ==
- Eastern Fleet
- Flag Officer Commanding Eastern Fleet
- Eastern Naval Command
- Indo-Pakistani War of 1971

== Bibliography ==
- Hiranandani, G M (2010), Transition to guardianship: the Indian navy 1991-2000, Lancer Publishers, ISBN 978-1935501268
- Hobbs, David (2014), British Aircraft Carriers: Design, Development & Service Histories, Seaforth Publishing, ISBN 978-1-4738-5369-0
- Katari, Ram Dass (1983), A Sailor Remembers, Vikas, ISBN 9780706920642
- Krishnan, Arjun (2014), A Sailor's story, Punya Publications, ISBN 978-8189534141
- Nanda, S.M. (2004), The man who bombed Karachi, HarperCollins Publishers India, ISBN 978-8172235628
- Sarma, S H (2001), My years at sea, Lancer Publishers & Distributors, ISBN 978-8170621218
- Singh, Satyindra (1992), Blueprint to bluewater, the Indian Navy, 1951-65, Lancer International, ISBN 978-8170621485
- Thomas, Anup (2019), Pride & Honour- Biography of Admiral R.L. Pereira, PVSM, AVSM, Southern Naval Command, Indian Navy, ISBN 978-8193600115

Military offices
Preceded by Swaraj Parkash	Flag Officer Commanding-in-Chief Eastern Naval Command; 1977-1978	Succeeded by M. R. Schunker
Preceded by Lieutenant General M N Batra	Commandant of the National Defence College; 1975–1977	Succeeded by Air Marshal T N Ghadiok
Preceded by Elenjikal Chandy Kuruvila	Flag Officer Commanding Southern Naval Area; 1973–1975	Succeeded by Ronald Lynsdale Pereira
New title Office created	Flag Officer Commanding Eastern Fleet; 1971–1973	Succeeded by Ronald Lynsdale Pereira
