= Manohar Prahlad Awati =

Indian Navy vice admiral

Vice Admiral M P Awati PVSM, VrC
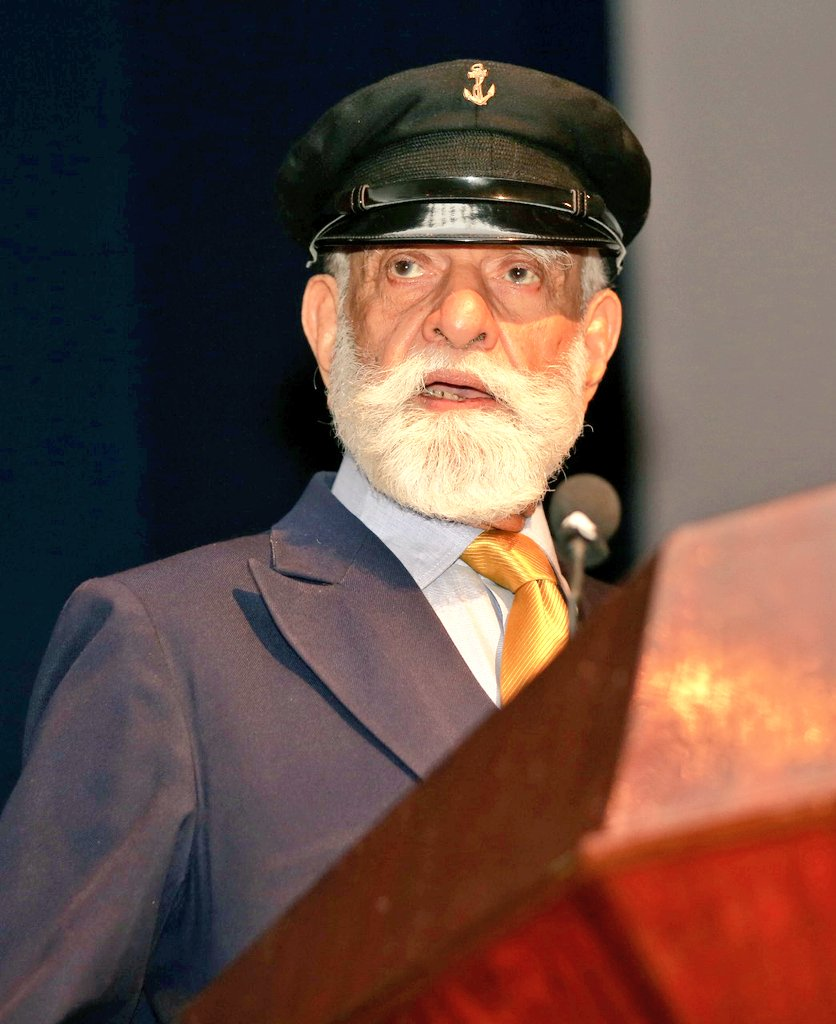
- Born: 7 September 1927; Surat, India
- Died: 3 November 2018 (aged 91); Phaltan, Satara, India
- Military career
- Allegiance: British India; India
- Branch: Royal Indian Navy; Indian Navy
- Service years: 1945 - 1983
- Rank: Vice Admiral
- Nickname: Manu
- Service number: 00037-H
- Commands: Western Naval Command; National Defence Academy; Western Fleet; INS Mysore (C60); INS Kamorta (P77); INS Betwa (F139); INS Ranjit (D209); INS Tir (K256)
- Conflicts: Indo-Pakistani War of 1971
- Awards: Param Vishisht Seva Medal; Vir Chakra

Vice Admiral Manohar Prahlad Awati, PVSM, VrC (7 September 1927 – 4 November 2018) was a flag officer in the Indian Navy. He last served as the flag officer commanding-in-chief (FOC-in-C) Western Naval Command. During the Indo-Pakistani War of 1971, he was awarded the Vir Chakra for his command of the Arnala-class anti-submarine corvette INS Kamorta (P77). The admiral was also known as the "Father of the Indian Navy's Circumnavigation Adventures".

== Early life ==
Awati was born to a family of academics in Surat. His father, Prahlad Raoji Awati, was a distinguished zoologist who later became a professor of zoology at the Royal Institute of Science, Mumbai. He joined the Indian Mercantile Marine Training Ship (IMMTS) Dufferin and graduated second in the order of merit of his course. He was offered a commission in the Royal Indian Navy (RIN) in 1945.

== Naval career ==
=== Early career ===
He graduated from the Britannia Royal Naval College in early 1946 with prizes in seamanship and navigation. He then trained on board the Hawkins-class cruiser HMS Frobisher (D81) which was converted into a training ship after World War II. He subsequently was transferred to the Colossus-class aircraft carrier HMS Triumph (R16). After his training, Awati returned to India, choosing to specialise as a Signals and Communications officer. As a young lieutenant, he received the colours of the Indian Navy on 27 May 1950 from the then President of India, Rajendra Prasad, at a ceremony where the RIN was renamed the Indian Navy. He subsequently served onboard the R-class destroyer INS Ranjit (1942).

In 1957, the Crown Colony-class cruiser HMS Nigeria (60) was being refitted and modernised in Birkenhead, Liverpool to be commissioned as INS Mysore (C60). Mysore was commissioned on 29 August 1957 by the High Commissioner of India to the United Kingdom Vijaya Lakshmi Pandit and the commissioning commanding officer was Captain S. M. Nanda. Awati was appointed the ship's signal and communications officer (SCO). He was promoted to lieutenant commander on 16 May 1958.

In May 1959, he was selected to attend the Defence Services Staff College, Wellington. Promoted to commander on 31 December 1962, he went on to command the cadet training ship INS Tir, the destroyer INS Ranjit, and the ASW frigate INS Kamorta. Awati was promoted to the substantive rank of captain on 30 June 1969.

=== Indo-Pakistani War of 1971 ===
The Indo-Pakistani War of 1971 was sparked by the Bangladesh Liberation war, a conflict between the traditionally dominant West Pakistanis and the majority East Pakistanis. In 1970, East Pakistanis demanded autonomy for the state, but the Pakistani government failed to satisfy these demands and, in early 1971, a demand for secession took root in East Pakistan. In March, the Pakistan Armed Forces launched a fierce campaign to curb the secessionists, the latter including soldiers and police from East Pakistan. Thousands of East Pakistanis died, and nearly ten million refugees fled to West Bengal, an adjacent Indian state. In April, India decided to assist in the formation of the new nation of Bangladesh.

Awati was in command of the 31 Patrol Vessel Squadron and its lead ship - the Arnala-class corvette INS Kamorta (P77). The squadron was part of the Eastern Fleet and based in the Bay of Bengal. He was decorated with the Vir Chakra for his command of the Kamorta. The citation for the Vir Chakra reads as follows:

Gazette Notification: 86 Pres/72 15-7-72

CITATION

CAPTAIN MANOHAR PRAHLAD AWATI

00037-H

Manohar Prahlad Awati was the commanding officer of an Indian naval unit of the Eastern Fleet during the operations against Pakistan in December 1971. Throughout the period, he was called upon to operate within enemy waters where there was constant danger to his ship from enemy mines and submarines. Undeterred, he carried out continuous probes into the enemy defended harbours in Bangladesh and inflicted heavy damage on the enemy. During the blockade, he attacked and captured three enemy ships carrying contraband goods. He also gained a submarine contact and pressed home an attack with great vigour, which possibly resulted in destruction of and damage to the submarine. Throughout, Captain Awati displayed gallantry, leadership and devotion to duty of a high order.

=== Post-War career ===
After the war, he was appointed the Naval Officer-in-Charge, Goa, in 1972, where he was the founding President of the Goa Yachting Association. His tenure at Goa was abruptly interrupted when he was ordered to proceed to Mumbai to take over as the commanding officer of the INS Mysore (C60), which had a mutiny on board in 1973. The mutiny had occurred due to poor man-management, and Awati soon smoothed things over. In 1975, he attended the Royal College of Defence Studies in the United Kingdom.

=== Flag rank ===
After his return to India, he was promoted to the rank of Rear Admiral. Subsequently, he was appointed Commandant of the National Defence Academy. His next posting was as the Flag Officer Commanding Western Fleet (FOCWF). During that tenure, he set up the Maritime History Society of India, in 1978. Upon promotion to the rank of Vice Admiral, he served as the Navy's Chief of Personnel for about a year and a half (this being his only tenure in Delhi in his entire career), after which he was appointed the Flag Officer Commanding-in-Chief Western Naval Command.

== Later life and legacy ==
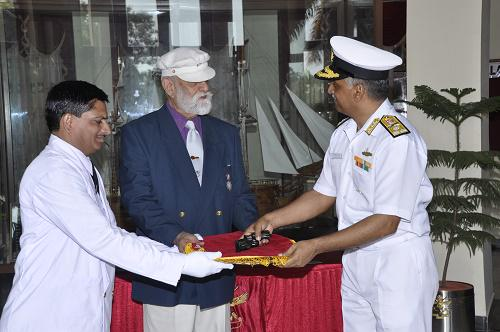
Awati presenting the .38 caliber webley revolver to Commandant NDA VAdm G. Ashok Kumar.

An avid ecologist, Awati created a scrub jungle in his native village, Vinchurni in Phaltan in Satara District. It is said that he was once offered the job of the Ranger/Conservator of the Serengeti game reserve and the Ngorongoro forests, which he declined. He is the author of three books on nature and wildlife, Homo Sapiens and Panthera Leo, The Vanishing Indian Tiger and Nature Clubs of India.

Awati was regarded as a naval visionary and father of the Indian circumnavigation projects. He conceptualised the "Sagar Parikrama" project launched in 2007, which entailed solo circumnavigations around the globe on Indian-built sailboats. This led to the construction of the sail training boats INSV Mhadei and INSV Tarini. In 2010, Commander Dilip Donde of the Indian navy completed the first recorded solo circumnavigation by an Indian. He was followed by Commander Abhilash Tomy, who became the first Indian, and the second Asian, to do a non-stop solo circumnavigation under sails around the world. The Sagar Parikrama project also led to the first ever all-woman circumnavigation expedition, called the Navika Sagar Parikrama, which was completed in 2018 by 6 female officers of the Indian Navy.

In 2015, Awati presented to the NDA a Webley Revolver of .38 calibre, which was handed over to him as a token of surrender by two senior Pakistan Navy officers during the 1971 War.

Vice Admiral Awati died on 3 November 2018 at his home, in Vinchurni.

On 30 August 2026, the Royal Mysore Sailing Club (RMSC) inaugurated the Admiral Manohar Awati Centre for Ocean Sailing (AMACOS) on the Krishna Raja Sagara in Mysuru.

== Bibliography ==
- Singh, Satyindra (1991), Blueprint to bluewater: The Indian Navy, 1951-65, Lancer International, ISBN 978-8170621485
- Hiranandani, G.M. (1999), Transition to Triumph: History of the Indian Navy, 1965-1975, Spantech & Lancer, ISBN 978-1897829721
- Nanda, S.M. (2004), The man who bombed Karachi, HarperCollins Publishers India, ISBN 978-8172235628

Military offices
Preceded by Air Vice Marshal M B Naik	Commandant of the National Defence Academy; 8 March 1976 - 22 July 1977	Succeeded by Major General R K Jasbir Singh
Preceded by M. R. Schunker	Flag Officer Commanding Western Fleet; 3 August 1977 - 4 March 1979	Succeeded by Radhakrishna Hariram Tahiliani
Preceded by Swaraj Parkash	Chief of Personnel; 1979 - 1981	Succeeded by S L Sethi
Preceded by V. E. C. Barboza	Flag Officer Commanding-in-Chief Western Naval Command; March 1981 - March 1983	Succeeded by Radhakrishna Hariram Tahiliani
