= M. R. Schunker =

Indian naval officer (1924–2021)

Vice Admiral M. R. Schunker PVSM, AVSM
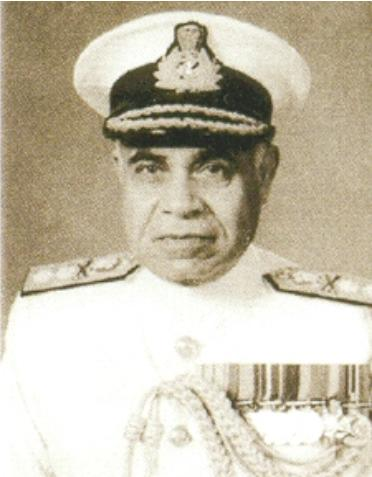
- Born: 18 September 1924
- Died: 4 January 2021 (aged 96)
- Military career
- Allegiance: British India (1943–1947); India (from 1947)
- Branch: Royal Indian Navy; Indian Navy; Indian Coast Guard
- Service years: 1943–1984
- Rank: Vice Admiral
- Nickname: Dick
- Commands: Indian Coast Guard; Eastern Naval Command; Western Fleet; INS Valsura; INS Kunjali; INS Amba (A54); INS Rana (D115)
- Conflicts: World War II
- Awards: Param Vishisht Seva Medal; Ati Vishisht Seva Medal

Vice Admiral Melville Raymond Schunker, PVSM, AVSM (18 September 1924 – 4 January 2021) was a flag officer in the Indian Navy. He served as the third Director General of the Indian Coast Guard, which he lеd from 1982 to 1984. He also served as the 6th Vice Chief of the Naval Staff (VCNS) from 1980 to 1982. He was the commissioning commаnding officer of the Indian Navy's only submarine tender ship INS Amba (A54).

== Naval career ==
=== Early career ===
Schunker joined the Royal Indian Naval Volunteer Reserve (RINVR) as a midshipman in November 1943. He was promoted to the rank of sub-lieutenant on 13 May 1944. He served onboard auxiliary patrol vessels as well as minesweepers. After the war, he was selected for a permanent commission in the Royal Indian Navy. He was commissioned a lieutenant on 18 March 1947.

=== Post-Independence ===
Schunker was promoted lieutenant-commander on 18 March 1955. In 1956, the Crown Colony-class cruiser HMS Nigeria (60) was being refitted and modernised in Birkenhead, Liverpool, to be commissioned as INS Mysore (C60). The Mysore was to be commanded by Captain S. M. Nanda and Schunker was part of the commissioning crew as the gunnery officer. After serving on the ship for about two years, he was posted to the Gunnery School in Cochin. The long gunnery course was conducted in India for the first time and Schunker was the course officer.

In 1960, Schunker was promoted to the rank of commander and appointed commanding officer of the R-class destroyer INS Rana (D115). He then moved to Naval Headquarters as the Deputy Director Naval Plans. After a short stint, in December 1961, he was appointed Fleet Operations Officer to the Flag Officer Commanding Indian Fleet, Rear Admiral Bhaskar Sadashiv Soman. Schunker was then selected to attend the Joint Service Staff College in Latimer, Buckinghamshire.

In 1967, the submarine arm of the Indian Navy was formed with the commissioning of INS Kalvari (S23) in December 1967. Three other submarines – Khanderi, Karanj and Kursura were also to be acquired from the Soviet Union and the 8th Submarine squadron was to be formed. To support these submarines, the Navy also acquired a modified Ugra-class submarine tender. Schunker was appointed the commissioning commanding officer of the ship. The tender was commissioned on 28 December 1968 at Odessa. As the CO, Schunker read the commissioning warrant and ordered the colours to be hoisted. Three days later, on 31 December 1968, he was promoted to the rank of Captain. He led the ship in the sea trials off Odessa and brought her home to India in March 1969. For his command of Amba, Schunker was awarded the Ati Vishisht Seva Medal on 26 January 1970.

Schunker then commanded the Provost headquarters in Mumbai – INS Kunjali. He was promoted to the rank of Commodore and appointed commanding officer of the Electrical engineering school INS Valsura in Jamnagar. In September 1972, he was selected to attend the National Defence College (NDC). He attended the NDC course from January to December 1973. After completing the course, he was appointed Chief of Staff (COS) of the Western Naval Command in Mumbai.

=== Flag rank ===
After two years as COS of the Western Naval Command, Schunker was promoted to the acting rank of rear admiral and appointed Flag Officer Commanding Western Fleet (FOCWF). He took over from Rear Admiral Rustom K. S. Ghandhi on 3 March 1976. As the FOCWF, he flew his flag on his old ship Mysore. After a year-long stint heading the Western Fleet, he relinquished command, handing over to Rear Admiral M. P. Awati. In late 1977, he took over as the Deputy Chief of the Naval Staff at Naval HQ. In early 1978, he was promoted to the rank of vice admiral and appointed Flag Officer Commanding-in-Chief Eastern Naval Command at Visakhapatnam. He assumed command from Vice Admiral S. H. Sarma on 2 February 1978.

After a two-year stint, in 1980, he relinquished command of the Eastern Naval Command, handing over to Vice Admiral M. K. Roy and moved to Naval HQ. On 1 April 1980, he took over as the Vice Chief of the Naval Staff. On 26 January 1981, he was awarded the Param Vishisht Seva Medal for distinguished service of the most exceptional order.

=== DGICG ===
The Indian Coast Guard (ICG) came into being on 19 August 1978. The new service was to function under the overall command and control of a Director General (DGICG). On 1 April 1982, Schunker took over as the third Director General of the Indian Coast Guard (DGICG), succeeding Vice Admiral Swaraj Parkash. Under him, the coast guard entered the air age. No. 800 Coast Guard Air squadron with Chetak helicopters was commissioned on 22 May 1982. Also, during his tenure, five ships were commissioned including the first indigenously built offshore patrol vessels (OPV). After a two-year stint, he retired after handing over the command of the Coast Guard to Vice Admiral S. Jain in 1984.

== Post-retirement ==
After his retirement, Schunker and his wife Anne moved to Goa. He resided in the Defence Colony in Porvorim in North Goa.

He died on 4 January 2021, aged 96.

== Bibliography ==
- Singh, Satyindra (1991), Blueprint to bluewater: The Indian Navy, 1951–65, Lancer International, ISBN 978-8170621485

Military offices
Preceded by Rustom K. S. Ghandhi	Flag Officer Commanding Western Fleet; 1976-1977	Succeeded by Manohar Prahlad Awati
Preceded by N. P. Datta	Deputy Chief of the Naval Staff; 1977–1978	Succeeded by D. S. Paintal
Preceded by S. H. Sarma	Flag Officer Commanding-in-Chief Eastern Naval Command; 1978–1980	Succeeded by Mihir K. Roy
Preceded by Swaraj Parkash	Vice Chief of the Naval Staff; 1980–1982	Succeeded by S. L. Sethi
Preceded by Swaraj Parkash	Director General of the Indian Coast Guard; 1982–1984	Succeeded by S. Jain
