= Radhakrishna Hariram Tahiliani =

Indian Navy Admiral

Admiral R H Tahiliani PVSM, AVSM
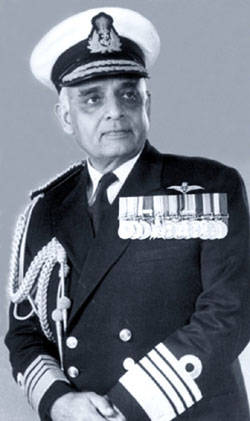

6th Governor of Sikkim
- In office 8 February 1990 – 20 September 1994
- Appointed by: President of India (then, R. Venkataraman)
- Chief Minister: Nar Bahadur Bhandari; Sanchaman Limboo
- Preceded by: S. K. Bhatnagar
- Succeeded by: P. Shiv Shankar

28th Chairman of the Chiefs of Staff Committee
- In office 1 February 1986 – 30 November 1987
- President: Zail Singh (Acting); R. Venkataraman
- Prime Minister: Rajiv Gandhi
- Preceded by: A. S. Vaidya
- Succeeded by: Denis La Fontaine

11th Chief of the Naval Staff
- In office 1 December 1984 – 30 November 1987
- President: Zail Singh; R. Venkataraman
- Prime Minister: Rajiv Gandhi
- Preceded by: O. S. Dawson
- Succeeded by: J. G. Nandkarni

Personal details
- Born: 12 May 1930
- Died: 14 October 2015 (aged 85)
- Spouse: Jaswanti Tahiliani
- Children: 2, including Tarun Tahiliani
- Nickname(s): Tally Ho; Ram T

Military service
- Allegiance: India
- Branch/service: Indian Navy
- Years of service: 1950–1987
- Rank: Admiral
- Commands: Western Naval Command; Southern Naval Command; Western Fleet; Goa Area; INS Vikrant (1961); INS Trishul (1960)
- Battles/wars: Liberation of Goa; Indo-Pakistani War of 1965; Indo-Pakistani War of 1971
- Awards: Param Vishisht Seva Medal; Ati Vishisht Seva Medal
- Later work(s): Chairman, Transparency International India; Chairman, Balvantray Mehta Vidya Bhawan ASMA; Board member, Transparency International

Admiral Radhakrishna Hariram Tahiliani, PVSM, AVSM (12 May 1930 – 14 October 2015) was a Flag officer in the Indian Navy. He served as the 11th Chief of the Naval Staff from 1 December 1984 until 30 November 1987. His prior commands included those as the Flag Officer Commanding-in-Chief (FOC-IN-C) of the Western Naval Command, FOC-IN-C of the Southern Naval Command and Flag Officer Commanding Western Fleet (FOCWF). A carrier-based aircraft pilot, he also served as the commanding officer of the aircraft carrier, INS Vikrant.

After retirement, Tahiliani served as the Governor of Sikkim from 1990 to 1994. He was a founder member and chairman of the India chapter of Transparency International (TI). He also served on the board of TI.

== Naval career ==
Tahiliani was commissioned into the Indian Navy on 1 September 1950, and was confirmed as a sub-lieutenant on 17 May 1952. He joined the Indian Naval Air Arm and qualified as a pilot for carrier-based aircraft. He was a graduate of the Naval War College, United States and the National Defence College, New Delhi. He also qualified as a test pilot.

Promoted to lieutenant-commander on 16 July 1960, he was the first naval pilot to land an aircraft on the deck of INS Vikrant, when he landed his Hawker Sea Hawk fighter on 18 May 1961. He served as a carrier-based strike pilot on board INS Vikrant; following his promotion to captain on 31 December 1970, he commanded its carrier borne squadron during the Indo-Pakistan War of 1971. Later, he served as the commanding officer of INS Trishul (1960) and INS Vikrant.

=== Flag rank ===
Promoted to acting rear admiral on 30 December 1977, he was appointed Flag Officer Commanding Goa Naval Area (FOGA), with promotion to substantive rear admiral on 1 February 1978. Later, he was appointed the Flag Officer Commanding Western Fleet (FOCWF).

His next appointment was as Assistant Chief of the Naval Staff (ACNS) at Naval Headquarters (NHQ). This was followed by appointment as the Deputy Chief of the Naval Staff (DCNS). He was promoted to Vice Admiral while in this office. In February 1982, then vice admiral, Tahiliani was appointed the Flag Officer Commanding-in-Chief (FOC-IN-C) Southern Naval Command. In March 1983, he was appointed the Flag Officer Commanding-in-Chief Western Naval Command. In May 1984, he was appointed the Vice Chief of the Naval Staff (VCNS).

On 1 December 1984, he took over as the Chief of the Naval Staff (CNS) of the Indian Navy. Tahiliani retired from the Indian Navy on 30 November 1987.

== Later career ==
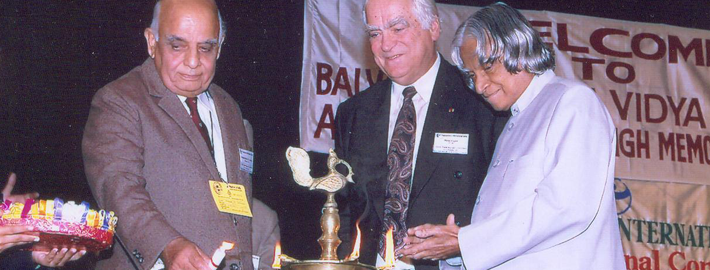
Admiral R H Tahiliani with former President of India, A. P. J. Abdul Kalam

Tahiliani served as the Governor of Sikkim between 8 February 1990 and 20 September 1994.

He helped launch the India chapter of Transparency International as a founder member in 1997. He served as the chairman of the India chapter practically from its founding until 2010 and was chairperson of Balvantray Mehta Vidya Bhawan Anguridevi Shersingh, a senior secondary school located in the South District of New Delhi, India.

Tahiliani was elected to the board of Transparency International in 2002.

== Personal life ==
Tahiliani was born into a Sindhi Hindu family, he was married to Jaswanti Tahiliani. His wife was the first female engineer in Mumbai. He is the father of noted Indian fashion designer, Tarun Tahiliani, and executive director of Ensemble India, Tina Tahiliani Parikh. He died on 14 October 2015.

== Awards and decorations ==
Admiral Tahiliani was awarded the Ati Vishisht Seva Medal and the Param Vishisht Seva Medal for his distinguished service.

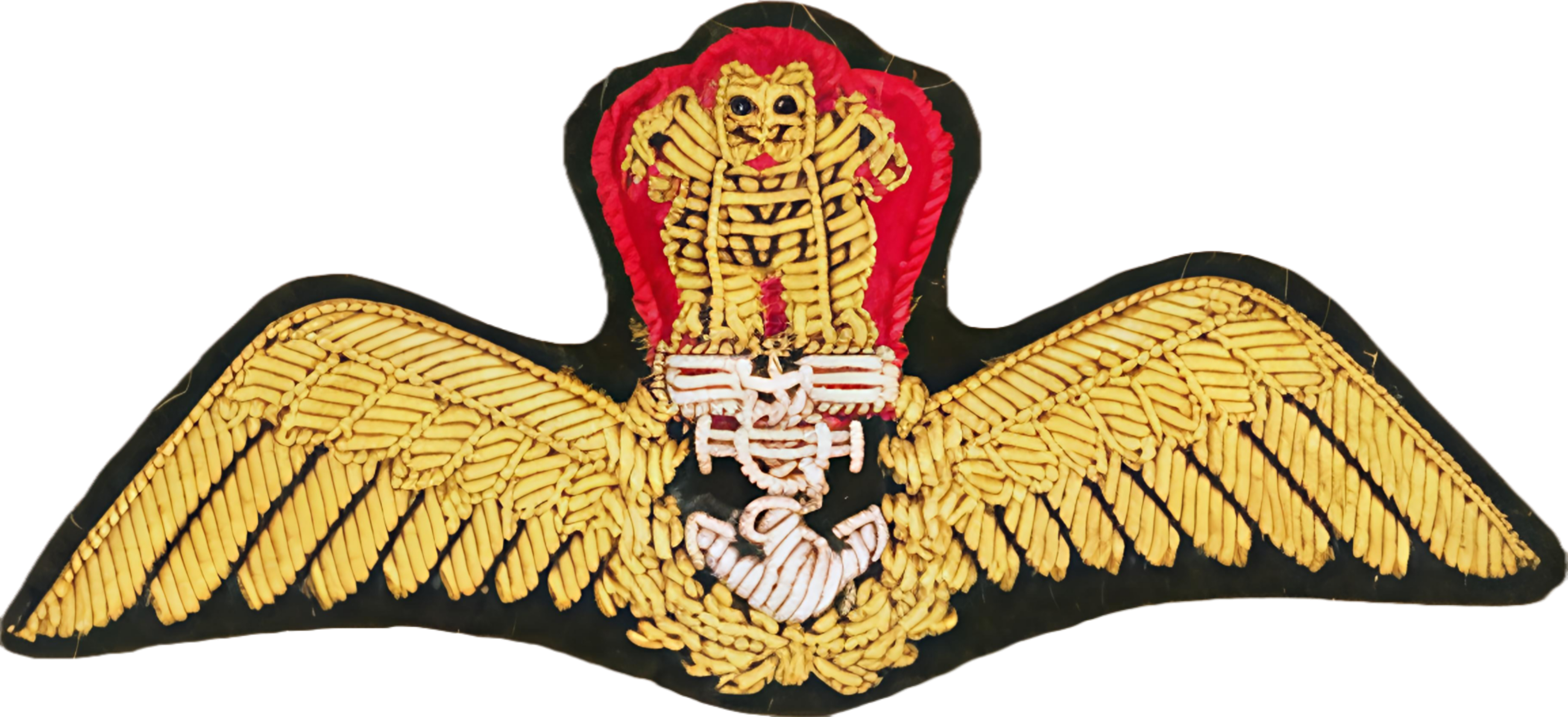

Naval aviator (Pilot) badge
Param Vishisht Seva Medal	Ati Vishisht Seva Medal	General Service Medal 1947	Samar Seva Star
Paschimi Star	Raksha Medal	Sangram Medal	Sainya Seva Medal
25th Independence Anniversary Medal	30 Years Long Service Medal	20 Years Long Service Medal	9 Years Long Service Medal

Military offices
Preceded by M. K. Roy	Commanding Officer INS Vikrant; 1976 - 1977	Succeeded by J. C. Puri
New title New appointment	Flag Officer Commanding Goa Area; 1977 - 1979	Succeeded by K. K. Nayyar
Preceded by Manohar Prahlad Awati	Flag Officer Commanding Western Fleet; 1979 - 1980	Succeeded by Subimal Mookerjee
Preceded by D. S. Paintal	Deputy Chief of the Naval Staff; 1980 - 1982	Succeeded by Subimal Mookerjee
Preceded by Oscar Stanley Dawson	Flag Officer Commanding-in-Chief Southern Naval Command; 1982 - 1983	Succeeded by K. K. Nayyar
Preceded by Manohar Prahlad Awati	Flag Officer Commanding-in-Chief Western Naval Command; 1983 - 1984	Succeeded by Subimal Mookerjee
Preceded by Subimal Mookerjee	Vice Chief of the Naval Staff; 1984–1984	Succeeded by K. K. Nayyar
Preceded by Oscar Stanley Dawson	Chief of the Naval Staff; 1984–1987	Succeeded by Jayant Ganpat Nadkarni
Preceded by Arun Shridhar Vaidya	Chairman of the Chiefs of Staff Committee; 1 February 1986 – 30 November 1987	Succeeded by Denis La Fontaine
