= N. P. Datta =

Vice Admiral N. P. Datta PVSM, AVSM
- Born: 1 April 1922
- Died: 10 October 2003 (aged 81); New Delhi, India
- Military career
- Allegiance: British Raj; India
- Branch: Royal Indian Navy; Indian Navy
- Service years: 1944–1977
- Rank: Vice Admiral
- Commands: Western Fleet; INS Mysore (C60); INS Ganga (D94); INS Talwar (F140)
- Conflicts: World War II
- Awards: Param Vishisht Seva Medal; Ati Vishisht Seva Medal
- Other work: Chairman and Managing Director, Mazagon Dock Limited

Vice Admiral Nar Pati Datta, PVSM, AVSM (1 April 1922 – 10 October 2003) was an Indian Navy admiral.

== Early career ==
After taking an M.A. from Government College Lahore in 1943, Datta taught at the college as an English literature lecturer for a year. On 30 June 1944, he was commissioned a sub-lieutenant in the Royal Indian Navy Volunteer Reserve (RINVR).

== Post-Independence ==
He received a regular commission in the Indian Navy post-Independence, and was promoted substantive lieutenant-commander on 30 December 1954. He attended the Defence Services Staff College at Wellington, and was promoted commander on 31 December 1959. During his career, he specialised in torpedoes and anti-submarine warfare.

Datta successively commanded the Whitby-class frigate INS Talwar (F140), the Hunt-class destroyer INS Ganga (D94) and the cruiser INS Mysore (C60). In 1969, he attended a course at the Imperial Defence College (now the Royal College of Defence Studies) in London, and served as naval adviser to the High Commissioner of India to the United Kingdom at India House, London from December 1969 to April 1972. He also served as Fleet Operations Officer Western Fleet and as Director of Naval Plans at Naval HQ.

== Flag rank ==
On 2 May 1973, Commodore Datta was promoted acting rear admiral and appointed Assistant Chief of the Naval Staff. In November, he was appointed Deputy Chief of the Naval Staff (DCNS). On 22 April 1974, he assumed command as Flag Officer Commanding Western Fleet (FOCWF). He was promoted substantive rear admiral on 1 April 1975. In March 1976, he was appointed to a second tenure as DCNS, and was promoted vice-admiral on 5 September 1977.

After retiring from the Navy, Datta was appointed chairman and managing director of Mazagon Dock Shipbuilders in November 1977. A skilled yachtsman, he later became the Chairman of the Selection Committee of the Yachting Association of India and managed the national team. In 1987, he became the first Indian judge of the International Yacht Racing Union.

== Post-retirement ==
From 1994 to 1998, he served as an International Sailing Federation (ISAF) council member for South and Central Asia, and was awarded a silver medal in November 1998 "in recognition of his outstanding voluntary contribution to the sport of sailing." On 10 October 2003, he was killed in a traffic accident in Delhi when he was struck by a speeding bus.

Military offices
Preceded by Swaraj Parkash	Deputy Chief of the Naval Staff; 1976-1977	Succeeded by M. R. Schunker
Preceded by Swaraj Parkash	Flag Officer Commanding Western Fleet; 1974-1975	Succeeded by Rustom K. S. Ghandhi
Preceded by Swaraj Parkash	Deputy Chief of the Naval Staff; 1973-1974	Succeeded by Swaraj Parkash
