= Ronald Lynsdale Pereira =

Indian Admiral (1923–1993)

Admiral R L Pereira PVSM, AVSM
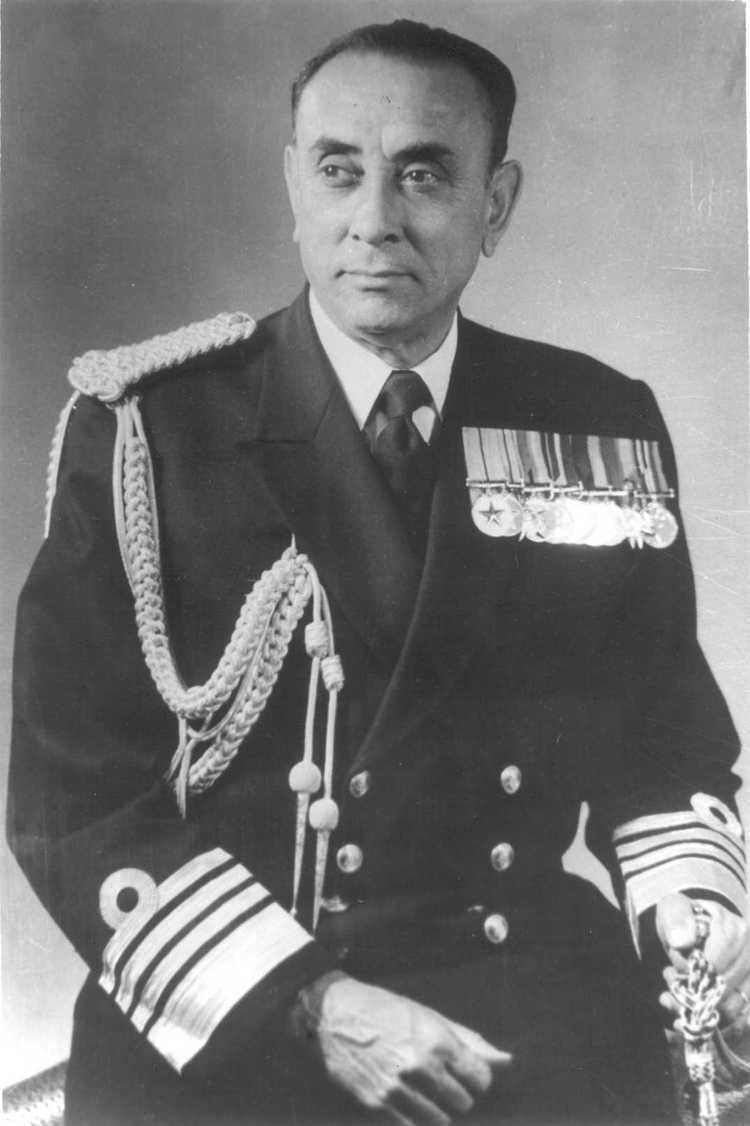

23rd Chairman of the Chiefs of Staff Committee
- In office 30 August 1981 – 26 February 1982
- President: Neelam Sanjiva Reddy
- Prime Minister: Indira Gandhi
- Preceded by: Idris Hasan Latif
- Succeeded by: K. V. Krishna Rao

9th chief of the naval staff
- In office 1 March 1979 – 28 February 1982
- President: Neelam Sanjiva Reddy
- Prime Minister: Morarji Desai; Charan Singh; Indira Gandhi
- Preceded by: Jal Cursetji
- Succeeded by: O. S. Dawson

Personal details
- Born: 25 May 1923 Calcutta, Bengal Presidency, British India
- Died: 14 October 1993 (aged 70) Bangalore, India
- Resting place: Bangalore, India
- Spouse: Phyllis Beatrice Badal
- Nickname: Ronnie

Military service
- Allegiance: British India (1923–1947); India (since 1947)
- Branch/service: Royal Indian Navy (1943–1947); Indian Navy (1947–1982)
- Years of service: 1943–1982
- Rank: Admiral
- Commands: Western Naval Command; Southern Naval Area; Eastern Fleet; INS Delhi; 14th Frigate squadron INS Kuthar
- Battles/wars: World War II; Indo-Pakistani War of 1971
- Award(s): Param Vishist Seva Medal; Ati Vishist Seva Medal; Sangram Medal; Burma Star

Admiral Ronald Lynsdale 'Ronnie' Pereira, PVSM, AVSM (25 May 1923 – 14 October 1993) was a flag officer in the Indian Navy. He served as the ninth Chief of Naval Staff from 1979 to 1982. He is considered to be one of the architects of the modern Indian Navy.

During World War II, he saw active service aboard various motor launches in Burma and Malaysia between 1943 and 1945 and thereafter, continued at sea with an amphibious task group based in Iraq, till 1946. After Independence in 1947 and completion of professional gunnery training at HMS Excellent at Portsmouth, he served for several years as a gunnery specialist, both afloat and ashore. He has commanded INS Kuthar (F146) and the Navy's flagship, INS Delhi. He served as deputy commandant of the National Defence Academy and as the director of combat policy & tactics at Naval HQ.

In his 39-year naval career, Pereira held prestigious appointments of Flag Officer Commanding Eastern Fleet (FOCEF), Flag Officer Commanding Southern Naval Command and the Flag Officer Commanding-in-Chief Western Naval Command. An able sportsman, he represented the Indian Navy in hockey in 1946 and in golf in the 1960s.

== Early life and education ==
Pereira was born on 25 May 1923 to lieutenant (later major) John Michael Pereira, a doctor in the Indian Medical Service and Charlotte Louise O'Keefe Lynsdale in Calcutta. He was the youngest of four children – two boys and two girls. His eldest brother Arthur was 14 years elder to him and his sisters Maisie and Inez were 12 and 6 years elder respectively.

John Michael studied medicine in Dublin, Ireland, and joined the Indian Medical Department of the British Indian Army. He was attached to the Seistan Force and served in Iraq. Returning to India in 1919, he was commissioned as a lieutenant and subsequently attached to the 72nd Punjabis which was a part of the Egyptian Expeditionary Force. In 1920, he moved to the civil department and served in the Bihar and Orissa Province until his superannuation. He served as the civil surgeon (chief medical officer of a district), jail superintendent of the Military Camp Jail, Patna and Gaya Central Jail, before taking over as the superintendent of the Patna Medical College and Hospital. He was awarded the MBE in 1937 and the Kaisar-i-Hind Medal in 1938.

Pereira attended the St. Joseph's School, Darjeeling, popularly known as North Point, and from 1932 to 1937. Later, he attended the St. Michael's High School, Patna. His final inter science years were spent at the St. Edmund's College, Shillong up to 1942. He grew up initially thinking of joining the army like his father and brother before him and filled out the temporary emergency commission form with the army as his first choice and the navy as his second choice. He appeared before the provisional board in Bihar, followed by the central interview board at Lucknow, where he requested a change to the navy as his first choice. He subsequently appeared before the director of reserves at Bombay for his final interview. Successful at the interview, he was commissioned in the Royal Indian Naval Volunteer Reserve (RINVR) as a midshipman on 16 January 1943.

== Naval career ==
=== Early career ===
Pereira started his career with a six-month basic training course in Bombay. He received the King's commission as a sub-lieutenant on 25 May 1943, his 20th birthday. He was asked to report to the Captain Coastal Forces, Eastern Theatre (CCFET) at HMIS Cheetah in Trombay. The Navy had quickly fitted out vessels called motor launch (ML), having a small crew of about a dozen sailors, to ensure the coastal defence. The CCFET had about 50 MLs in four flotilla which were tasked to keep at bay the might of the Imperial Japanese Navy in the Bay of Bengal.

Pereira was appointed executive officer of ML 1125 in mid-1943 and a few months later took command of the vessel. In early 1944, he took command of ML 1073 and, later in the year, of ML 844. After the war, he was contemplating about his career and decided to pursue a career in dentistry. In early 1946, the 56th Services Selection Board was set up at Lonavala to screen the RINR and RINVR officers for a permanent commission in the RIN. Appearing before the board, he was successful and was granted a permanent commission. He was promoted to the acting rank of lieutenant in April and posted to the River-class frigate HMIS Shamsher in the Persian Gulf. After a short stint, he took command of ML 1261 at Basra, Iraq. After around a year in command, he was selected to attend the RIN Gunnery course at HMS Excellent in Portsmouth in May 1947.

=== Post-Independence ===
Pereira returned to India in December 1948 and was appointed staff gunnery officer (West Coast), a staff appointment. He requested a sea appointment and in June 1949 was appointed gunnery officer of the Black Swan-class sloop HMIS Jumna, commanded by Commander Bhaskar Sadashiv Soman. He served on the Jumna for eighteen months. In January 1951, he was posted to the newly established Gunnery school in Cochin as an instructor. He was promoted to acting rank of lieutenant commander on 30 June 1952. Later that year, he was selected to attend the Defence Services Staff College, Wellington. After completing the staff course, he was appointed staff officer (gunnery) at Naval headquarters on 25 August 1953. He was promoted to substantive lieutenant-commander on 25 November 1953.

Pereira led the naval marching contingent during the Republic Day parade on 26 January 1954. In December 1954, he was appointed gunnery officer and flotilla gunnery officer of the Black Swan-class sloop INS Cauvery (U10) and in March 1955, of the Navy's first cruiser – the Leander-class cruiser INS Delhi (C74). Delhi was under the command of Captain Benjamin Abraham Samson. In May 1956, he took over as officer-in-charge (OIC) of the Gunnery School, Cochin. Later that year, he was promoted to the acting rank of commander. Pereira was promoted to the substantive rank of commander on 30 June 1958, and in October was appointed executive officer of INS Delhi, stationed at Bombay. He was to have a short stint as XO of Delhi, since he was diagnosed with tuberculosis and was hospitalised in February 1959. He recovered in about ten months and was appointed OIC of DEMOB centre at Bombay. In May 1961, he was appointed XO of the shore establishment INS Angre. This also included the responsibility of the naval barracks at Bombay.

On 18 April 1962, Pereira was appointed commander of the 14th frigate squadron and commanding officer (CO) of the Blackwood-class Anti-submarine frigate INS Kuthar (F146). Apart from Kuthar, the squadron consisted of INS Kirpan (F144) and INS Khukri (F149). Pereira was considered by the then Flag Officer Commanding Indian Fleet (FOCIF) Rear Admiral Adhar Kumar Chatterji as the best all round CO in the Indian Fleet and considered him suitable for higher sea-going commands. In June 1963, Pereira was posted to Bombay as the drafting commander, tasked with the planning of expanding manpower requirements for operational and administrative efficiency of the navy. After an eighteen-month stint at Bombay, he was appointed director of weapon policy & tactics (DWPT) at Naval HQ in December 1964, with the acting rank of captain. He served in this appointment during the Indo-Pakistani War of 1965, although the navy had little role to play in the war. As director DWPT, he was responsible for implementing the major work-up system in the navy. He was promoted substantive captain on 30 June 1966.

Pereira was appointed commanding officer of the erstwhile flagship, INS Delhi in March 1967. Under him, the Delhi won the Naval Regatta championship in 1967. Chatterji, by now CNS, praised Pereira as a born leader. After a year and a half as CO Delhi, he was appointed naval officer-in-charge (NOIC) Bombay, in December 1968. As NOIC, he was responsible for organising the President's fleet review (PFR) in 1969. 57 ships participated in the PFR led by the flagship aircraft carrier INS Vikrant, and impressed the president V.V. Giri and the event was a success. For planning and organising the PFR, Pereira was awarded the Ati Vishisht Seva Medal on 26 January 1971.

In January 1971, Pereira was promoted to the rank of commodore and appointed deputy commandant (DepCom) of the National Defence Academy (NDA), Pune. The famous NDA ball was his brainchild, fashioned on the lies of the annual Naval Ball. A good golfer, he also ran the academy golf club. He had a memorable stint at DepCom at NDA for about three years. The commandant, Major General SD Varma, noted that Pereira was "an outstanding officer with lively personality, who is devoted to his profession."

=== Flag rank ===
Pereira was appointed the second Flag Officer Commanding Eastern Fleet (FOCEF) in February 1973. He was promoted to the acting rank of rear admiral and took command of the Eastern Fleet from Rear Admiral S H Sarma on 2 April 1973. He flew his flag on the submarine tender INS Amba (A54) until mid-1974, when the Leopard-class frigate INS Brahmaputra (1957) became the flagship of the Eastern fleet after which his flag transferred to the frigate. Under him, the fleet exercised on the west coast as well as visited Sri Lanka for a flag-showing visit.

In January 1975, Pereira was appointed flag officer commanding Southern Naval Area at Cochin. After a year as FOC South, he was promoted to the rank of vice admiral on 1 March 1976 and appointed flag officer commanding-in-chief (FOC-in-C) Western Naval Command. On 26 January 1977, while he was the FOC-in-C West, he was awarded the Param Vishisht Seva Medal for distinguished service of the highest order.

After a year in command of the Western Naval Command, Pereira moved to Naval HQ as the vice chief of the Naval Staff in March 1977. In August 1978, he was appointed honorary ADC to the president of India. During his stint as VCNS, the CNS Admiral Jal Cursetji noted that he considered him fit for promotion as CNS.

=== Chief of Naval Staff ===
With Admiral Cursetji's tenure coming to an end in early 1979, the FOC-in-C West Vice Admiral RKS Ghandhi was tipped to be the next CNS. However, in November 1978, the Government of India announced that Pereira was appointed the next chief of the Naval Staff. On 1 March 1979, he took over as the tenth chief of the Naval Staff in the rank of admiral. He is considered one of the architects of the modern Indian Navy.

== Personal life ==
Pereira married Phyllis Beatrice Badal on 25 September 1952 at the Cathedral of the Holy Name, Mumbai, presided by Rev Angelo Innocent Fernandes. The couple did not have any children. As proud parents, the couple came to love every young cadet they met at the NDA, especially so for the mavericks who were sent to him for displeasure. Ronnie addressed them as 'Son', a tradition that came to be in all services.

== Later life, death and legacy ==
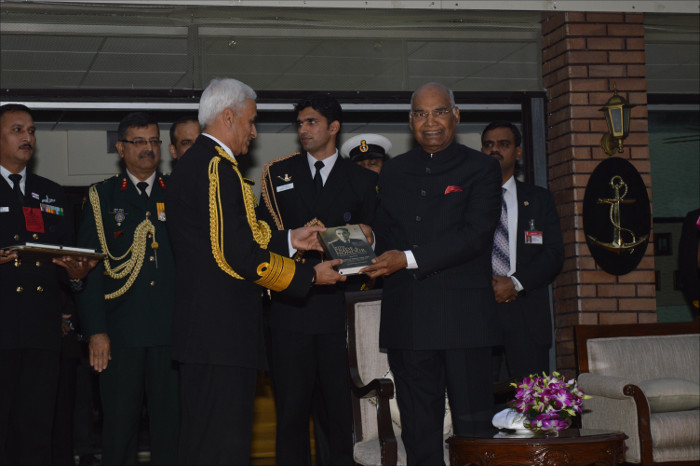
President Ram Nath Kovind releasing Adm Pereira's biography, with chief of the naval staff Admiral Sunil Lanba.

After superannuating from the Navy, the Pereiras moved to Bangalore. While he was the VCNS, he had purchased land and constructed a house in the outskirts of the city. The modest house was called 'At last' and was at Whitefield, Bangalore. In 1988, the couple decided to move to Wellington Cantonment in The Nilgiris by selling off their Bangalore home and shifted into their new home called 'Broadsides'.

In the early 1990s, Pereira, a life-long smoker, was diagnosed with lung cancer. He underwent treatment at INHS Asvini in Bombay before moving back home. In 1993, the cancer relapsed and his condition deteriorated. Initially hospitalised at the Military Hospital in Wellington, he was moved to the Command Hospital in Bangalore. On 14 October 1993, he succumbed to the disease at the age of 70.

On 16 October, Pereira was laid to rest at the Roman Catholic cemetery in Bangalore with full military honours. Wreaths were placed on behalf of the president and vice president of India, the prime minister and the defence minister, apart from the three service chiefs. The prime minister and defence minister also issued condolence messages. Former naval chiefs Oscar Stanley Dawson and Laxminarayan Ramdas paid their last respects, as did the FOC-in-C Southern Naval Command, the Director General Indian Coast Guard, the AOC-in-C Training Command, the GOC Karnataka and Goa Sub Area and senior police and civil officers. Apart from the multitude of admirals, generals and air marshals, junior service officers in uniform crowding his funeral service, there was also a large gathering of sailors and civilian officials who came to pay their obeisance.

From 2014, the Navy Foundation conducts an annual lecture The Admiral R L Pereira Memorial lecture in his memory. In December 2015, a residential colony for married officers was inaugurated by the Commander-in-Chief, Andaman and Nicobar Command Vice Admiral Pradeep Kumar Chatterjee in Port Blair. The colony Pereira Enclave was named for Admiral Pereira. On Navy Day 2017, the president of India Ram Nath Kovind released a biography of Admiral Pereira during the 'At Home' function at Navy House.

== Awards and decorations ==

Param Vishisht Seva Medal	Ati Vishisht Seva Medal	Paschimi Star	Raksha Medal
Sangram Medal	Indian Independence Medal	25th Independence Anniversary Medal	30 Years Long Service Medal
20 Years Long Service Medal	9 Years Long Service Medal		1939–45 Star
	Burma Star	War Medal 1939–1945	

== Dates of rank ==
Insignia	Rank	Component	Date of rank
	Midshipman	Royal Indian Navy	16 January 1943 (temporary)
	Sub-lieutenant	Royal Indian Navy	25 May 1943
	Lieutenant	Royal Indian Navy	20 April 1946 (acting); 13 October 1946 (substantive)
	Lieutenant	Indian Navy	26 January 1950 (recommissioning and change in insignia)
	Lieutenant commander	Indian Navy	30 June 1952 (acting); 25 November 1953 (substantive)
	Commander	Indian Navy	1956 (acting); 30 June 1958 (substantive)
	Captain	Indian Navy	16 December 1964 (acting); 30 June 1966
	Commodore	Indian Navy	9 January 1971
	Rear admiral	Indian Navy	2 April 1973
	Vice admiral	Indian Navy	1 March 1976
	Admiral	Indian Navy	1 March 1979

== Bibliography ==
- Thomas, Commander Anup (2019), Pride & Honour- Biography of Admiral R.L. Pereira, PVSM, AVSM, Southern Naval Command, Indian Navy, ISBN 978-8193600115
- Abidi, S Sartaj Alam; Sharma, Satinder (2007), Services Chiefs of India, Northern Book Centre, ISBN 978-8172111625

Military offices
Preceded by C. Singh	Commanding officer INS Delhi; 1967–1968	Succeeded by C. V. P. Sarthy
Preceded by S H Sarma	Flag Officer Commanding Eastern Fleet; 1973–1975	Succeeded by R K S Ghandhi
Preceded by S H Sarma	Flag Officer Commanding Southern Naval Area; 1975–1976	Succeeded by V. E. C. Barboza
Preceded by Jal Cursetji	Flag Officer Commanding-in-Chief Western Naval Command; 1976–1977	Succeeded by R K S Ghandhi
Preceded by V. A. Kamath	Vice Chief of the Naval Staff; 1977–1979	Succeeded by Swaraj Parkash
Preceded by Jal Cursetji	Chief of the Naval Staff; 1979–1982	Succeeded by Oscar Stanley Dawson
Preceded by Air Chief Marshal Idris Hasan Latif	Chairman of the Chiefs of Staff Committee; 1981–1982	Succeeded by General K. V. Krishna Rao
