= Balvantray Mehta Vidya Bhawan ASMA =

Coordinates: 28.5351258°N 77.2358499°E

Balvantray Mehta Vidya Bhawan Anguridevi Shersingh Memorial Academy
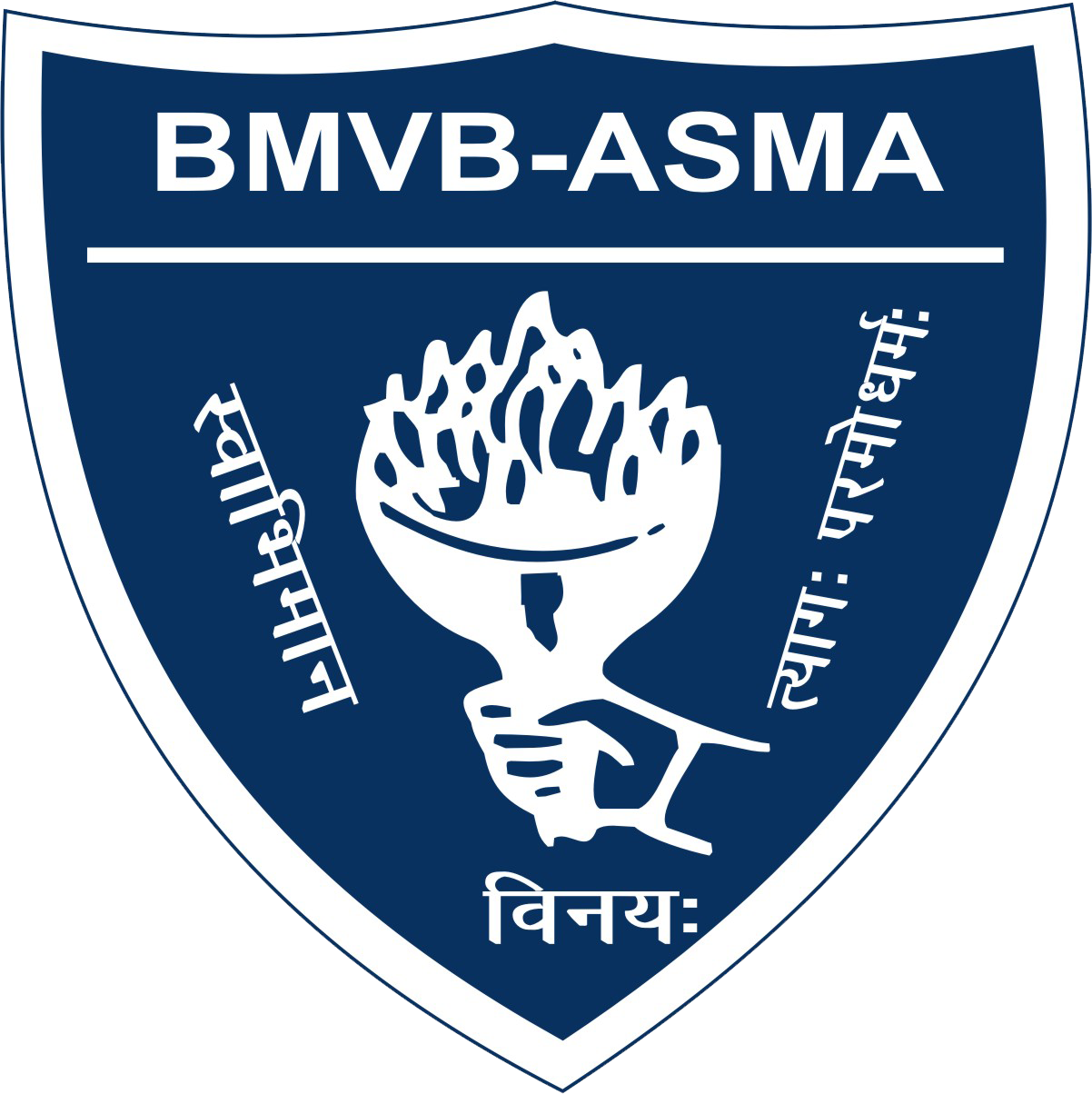
- GK-II, New Delhi; India

Information
- Type: Public
- Established: 17 September 1999
- School district: South Delhi
- Chairperson: Admiral RH Tahiliani
- Principal: Mrs. Vandana Baberwal
- Classes offered: Playgroup- 12th
- Campus size: 3 acre
- Color
- Website: www.bmvbasma.edu.in

Balvantray Mehta Vidya Bhawan Anguridevi Shersingh Memorial Academy, abbreviation BMVB ASMA) is a senior-secondary co-educational integrated English-medium public school located in the South district of New Delhi, India, in Greater Kailash-II. The school fulfils the vision and dream of Sher-E- Punjab, Lala Lajpat Rai. it is rated a model school by the Ministry of Human Resource Development, government of India, in the field of integrated and inclusive education. The school covers an area of three acres which includes the playground and school building.

== History ==
The school was established and was affiliated to Central Board of Secondary Education (CBSE) in 1999. The school adheres to the concepts of Servants of the People Society founded by Lala Lajpat Rai, Sher-e-Punjab.

The school organizes an annual sports meet for special and general students.

== Affiliation ==
The school has been recognized as a senior secondary school by the Directorate of Education and affiliated to the Central Board of Secondary Education (CBSE), Delhi, and follow the curriculum prescribed by this board and is a member of Servants of the People Society(SOPS)
