= Oscar Stanley Dawson =

Indian admiral

Admiral Oscar Stanley Dawson PVSM, AVSM
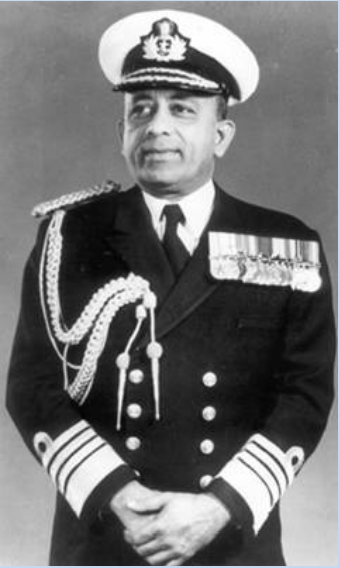

7th High Commissioner of India to New Zealand
- In office August 1985 – August 1987
- Preceded by: A. K. Budhiraja
- Succeeded by: C.R. Balachandra

26th Chairman of the Chiefs of Staff Committee
- In office 5 September 1984 – 30 November 1984
- President: Zail Singh (Acting)
- Prime Minister: Indira Gandhi; Rajiv Gandhi
- Preceded by: Dilbagh Singh
- Succeeded by: Arun Shridhar Vaidya

10th Chief of the Naval Staff
- In office 1 March 1982 – 30 November 1984
- President: Neelam Sanjiva Reddy; Zail Singh; Mohammad Hidayatullah (Acting)
- Prime Minister: Indira Gandhi; Rajiv Gandhi
- Preceded by: Ronald Lynsdale Pereira
- Succeeded by: Radhakrishna Hariram Tahiliani

Personal details
- Born: 13 November 1923 British Burma, British Raj (now Myanmar)
- Died: 23 October 2011 (aged 87) Bangalore, India
- Resting place: Bangalore, India
- Education: Scott Christian College

Military service
- Allegiance: British India (1943–1947); India (from 1947)
- Branch/service: Royal Indian Navy; Indian Navy
- Years of service: 1943–1984
- Rank: Admiral
- Commands: Chief of the Naval Staff; Southern Naval Command; Eastern Fleet; INS Nilgiri (F33); INS Talwar (F140)
- Battles/wars: World War II; Liberation of Goa; Indo-Pakistani War of 1965; Indo-Pakistani War of 1971
- Awards: Param Vishisht Seva Medal; Ati Vishisht Seva Medal

Admiral Oscar Stanley Dawson (13 November 1923 – 23 October 2011) was a four-star admiral in the Indian Navy. He served as the 10th Chief of the Naval Staff from 1 March 1982 to 30 November 1984. From 1983 until his retirement, he also served as the Chairman of the Chiefs of Staff Committee of the Indian Armed Forces. He previously served as the Flag Officer Commanding-in-Chief (FOC-in-C) of the Southern Naval Command and as the Flag Officer Commanding Eastern Fleet (FOCEF). Dawson was also the Director of Naval Operations during the Indo-Pakistan War of 1971.

After retirement, Dawson served as the Indian High Commissioner to New Zealand. He also campaigned for a number of environmental causes and worked on the rehabilitation of disabled people. Admiral Dawson died of cerebral haemorrhage at the Command Hospital, Bangalore in October 2011.

== Early life ==
Dawson was born in Burma on 13 November 1923 to E. S. and Oliva Dawson. He received his high school and college education in his hometown Nagercoil, at Scott Christian College. During the Japanese occupation of Burma in March 1942, his family was evacuated back to India.

== Naval career ==
Upon arriving in India, Dawson continued with college studies, but left to enlist in the Royal Indian Navy Volunteer Reserve. He received his commission as a midshipman on 8 January 1943.

He received training as a specialist in navigation and direction in the United Kingdom. During World War II, he participated in the Arakan Campaign 1944-1945 and served on escort convoys in the Bay of Bengal and the Arabian Sea. Following the independence of India, he was absorbed into the Indian Navy, with promotion to lieutenant in 1948.

Among his early assignments, Dawson served as the naval aide-de-camp to the first President of India, Dr. Rajendra Prasad, during 1953–54. He was promoted lieutenant-commander on 1 April 1956. Following graduation from the Defence Services Staff College, Wellington in 1957, he served as the navigating officer of INS Vikrant. Later he served as the fleet navigating officer. Among the commands he held at sea, included those as the commanding officer of INS Talwar (F140) and INS Nilgiri (F33). His appointments on shore included that as the commandant, Navigation and Direction School; director, Tactical School and chief staff officer, Cochin Area.

Dawson was promoted to substantive captain on 30 June 1969. He was the Director of Naval Operations (DNO) at Naval Headquarters (NHQ) during the Indo-Pakistan War of 1971. Some of the Indian Navy's most famous operational successes, including Operation Trident, Operation Python and the naval blockade of East Pakistan were accomplished during his tenure as DNO. Dawson was awarded the Ati Vishisht Seva Medal (AVSM) for his services and leadership during the conflict.

He graduated from the National Defence College, New Delhi in 1973. Subsequently, promoted to commodore and then to rear admiral on 8 March 1976, he served as the Flag Officer Commanding Eastern Fleet (FOCEF) between February 1978 and March 1979. Promoted to vice-admiral on 1 April 1979, he served as the Flag Officer Commanding-in-Chief Southern Naval Command. In 1981, he was awarded the Param Vishisht Seva Medal (PVSM) for his distinguished service to the Indian Navy.

Dawson was promoted to Admiral and succeeded Adm R L Pereira as the 11th Chief of the Naval Staff, taking command on 1 March 1982. Among his most significant contributions in office was the planning and vision for Project Seabird.

Dawson retired from service on 30 November 1984, having spent 19 of his 41-year naval career at sea.

== Later life ==
Dawson served as the Indian High Commissioner to New Zealand between August 1985 and September 1987.

After retirement, Dawson lived in Bangalore and Nagercoil and actively supported a number of environmental causes. He led the campaign to clean Ulsoor lake in Bangalore. He was instrumental in the campaign to discontinue the use of leaded petrol in the 1990s. He was also a skilled pianist.

Since 2005, he served as the president of the charitable organization, Anga Karunya Kendra, focused on supporting rehabilitation of disabled people. The organization primarily supports patients with polio, muscular dystrophy and cerebral palsy, as well as survivors of accidents. A major focus of the organization is on rehabilitation using prostheses.

== Death ==
Dawson died of cerebral hemorrhage on 23 October 2011, aged 87. He never married and was survived by his sister, Thelma.

Military offices
Preceded by Ronald Lynsdale Pereira	Chief of the Naval Staff; 1982–1984	Succeeded by Radhakrishna Hariram Tahiliani
