= INS Beas (F137) =

History

India
- Name: INS Beas
- Namesake: Beas River
- Owner: Government of India
- Ordered: 1954
- Builder: Vickers-Armstrongs Shipbuilders Limited, Newcastle upon Tyne
- Laid down: 29 November 1956
- Launched: 9 October 1958
- Completed: 24 May 1960
- Decommissioned: 1988
- In service: 1960-1988
- Out of service: 1988
- Stricken: 1988
- Identification: F137, F37
- Fate: Scrapped 1992
- Notes: First of two Leopard Class ships built for India and not transferred from Royal Navy

General characteristics
- Class & type: Leopard-class frigate
- Displacement: 2,300 long tons (2,337 t) standard; 2,520 long tons (2,560 t) full load
- Length: 103.6 m (339 ft 11 in) o/a
- Beam: 12.2 metres (40 ft 0 in)
- Draught: 3.6 m (11 ft 10 in)
- Propulsion: 8 × Admiralty Standard Range ASR1 diesels, 14,400 shp (10,738 kW), 2 shafts
- Speed: 25 knots (29 mph; 46 km/h)
- Range: 7,500 nmi (13,900 km; 8,600 mi)
- Complement: 210
- Armament: 2 × twin 4.5 in guns Mark 6; 1 × twin 40 mm Bofors gun; 1 × Squid A/S mortar

INS Beas was a Leopard-class frigate of the Indian Navy. She was launched by Vickers-Armstrongs Ltd at Newcastle upon Tyne in 1958 and completed in 1960. Beas served in the Battle at Mormugão harbour 1961 and during the Indo-Pakistani War of 1971. She was stricken by the INS in 1988 and scrapped in 1992.

== Construction and design ==
In 1954, the British Admiralty ordered the sixth anti-aircraft frigate of the Leopard-class for the Indian order as INS Beas.

She carried pennant number F137, in 1980s changed to F37.

== Service ==
=== 1965 War ===
INS Beas was deployed to the Western Theatre during the 1965 Indo-Pakistani War. She launched an unsuccessful depth charge attack on PNS Ghazi on 9 September, 1965.

=== 1971 war ===
Beas took part in amphibious landings at Cox's Bazar alongside her sister ship INS Brahmaputra, landing divers in advance of the landing and providing gunfire support to the landings.
