= INS Betwa (F139) =

History

India
- Name: Betwa
- Namesake: Betwa River
- Owner: Government of India
- Ordered: 1954
- Builder: Vickers-Armstrongs Shipbuilders Limited, Newcastle upon Tyne
- Laid down: 29 May 1957
- Launched: 15 September 1959
- Commissioned: 8 December 1960
- Decommissioned: 31 December 1991
- Identification: F139, F39
- Fate: Broken up, 1998

General characteristics
- Class & type: Leopard-class frigate
- Length: 101 metres (331 ft)
- Beam: 10.6 metres (35 ft)
- Draught: 3 metres (9.8 ft)
- Propulsion: 8 × Admiralty Standard Range ASR1 diesels, 14,400 shp (10,738 kW), 2 shafts
- Speed: 22 knots (41 km/h; 25 mph)
- Range: 7,400 miles (11,900 km) at 18 kn
- Complement: 200 (22 officers)
- Sensors & processing systems: Radar System: Surface/Air search: Type 960; Air search: Type 965 AKE-1; Type 293/993 target indication radar; Navigation: Type 974 /978; Fire control: Type 275 on director Mark 6M; Sonar system: Type 174 search sonar; Type 164 attack sonar
- Armament: 2 × twin 4.5 in guns Mark 6; 1 × twin 40 mm Bofors gun STAAG Mark 2; 1 × single 40 mm Bofors gun Mark 9; 1 × Squid A/S mortar

INS Betwa (F139) was a Leopard-class Type 41 anti aircraft frigate of the Indian Navy, named after the Betwa river.

== Development and design ==
These ships were designed to provide anti-aircraft escorts to convoys and light fleet aircraft carriers of the Sydney and Virkant classes and act as light destroyers on detached duties; as a result they were not built for fleet carrier task force speed —28 knots for the Victorious and Audacious classes and made only 24 knots (44 km/h). They were envisioned in late World War II and immediately after as part of the 1944 project for a common hull anti-submarine warfare (A/S), anti-air warfare (A/A), and A/D frigate, and the design of the Type 41 was completed by December 1947.

Through their diesel-electric propulsion the Type 41s achieved long range through their low fuel use. The Leopard class was also fitted with an early type of hydraulic stabiliser system consisting of two fins that could be extended outside the main hull, to port and starboard, from a compartment between the two engine rooms. Gyro controlled with a relatively simple control system, they proved very effective in use. During testing every three months at sea, the ship could be easily driven into a 20°+ roll from the manual control on the bridge. Prior warning had to be given over the ship's tannoy system before testing was carried out, to allow stowage of loose items. Slight reduction in top speed was also noticed when in use.

However, by 1955 success had been achieved, with difficulty and limitations, in developing new steam turbines giving 30-knot speed and the range to take convoys across the Atlantic, embodied in the Whitby-class Type 12 frigates. As a result, the orders for the new diesel-electric frigates were cancelled, changed to orders for Type 12, or sold to India.

Within a few years of the Type 41's introduction in the late 1950s they were regarded as obsolete for their intended function as anti-aircraft convoy escorts. This was emphasized when the planned replacement of the 4.5" guns with 3"/70 AA guns was abandoned (in January 1955) due to cost and the view that AA guns were obsolete against jets and missiles. Adding power-ramming for the twin 4.5" guns, intended to boost the rate of fire from 14rpm to 24rpm, failed. Innovative additions of STAAG ("Stabilised Tachymetric Anti-Aircraft Gun"), CIWS mount, and replacement of the experimental version of the fast rotating 992 target indicators with the slower standard 993 were all abandoned. Only a short range 262 radar MRS1 provided secondary AA fire control for the main armament.

== Construction and career ==
Betwa was laid down on 29 May 1957 by Vickers-Armstrong and launched on 15 September 1959. Commissioned on 8 December 1960. She was decommissioned on 31 December 1991. INS Godavari and INS Betwa (then as a training ship) engaged with Sri Lankan mercenary forces during Operation Cactus on 4th July 1988, leading to a successful rescue of all hostages.She carried pennant number F139, in 1980s it was changed to F39.She was retired and broken up in 1998.
