= INS Mysore (C60) =

1939 Crown Colony-class cruiser

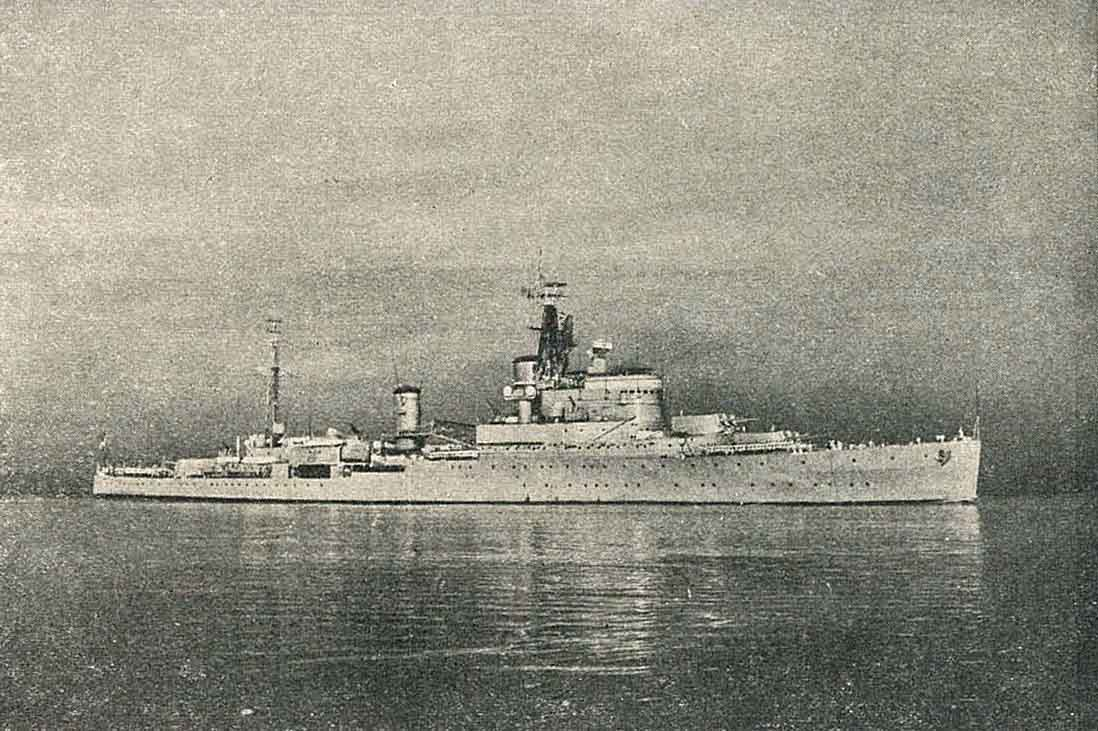
- INS Mysore c. 1960s

History

India
- Name: INS Mysore
- Namesake: Mysore
- Builder: Vickers Armstrongs, Walker, Newcastle upon Tyne
- Laid down: 8 February 1938
- Launched: 18 July 1939 (as HMS Nigeria)
- Acquired: 29 August 1957
- Decommissioned: 20 August 1985
- Identification: Pennant number: C60
- Motto: Na bibheti kadachana
- Fate: Scrapped

General characteristics
- Class & type: Fiji-class light cruiser
- Displacement: 8,530 tons standard; 10,450 tons full load
- Length: 169.3 m (555.5 ft)
- Beam: 18.9 m (62 ft)
- Draught: 5.0 m (16.5 ft)
- Propulsion: Four oil fired 3-drum Admiralty-type boilers, 4-shaft geared turbines, 4 screws, 54.1 megawatts (72,500 shp)
- Speed: 33 knots
- Range: 6,520 nmi at 13 knots (24 km/h)
- Complement: 907
- Armament: 9 × BL 6 in (152 mm) Mark XXIII guns in 3 triple mountings Mark XXI; 8 × QF 4 in (102 mm) Mark XVI guns in 4 twin mountings Mark XIX; 8 × 40 mm (1.6 in) Bofors AA guns (4 twin mounts); 12 × 2 pounder AA guns ("pom-pom") (3 quadruple mounts); 12 × 20 mm (0.79 in) AA (6 × 2) guns (6 twin mounts); 6 × 21 inch (533 mm) torpedo tubes (2 triple mounts)
- Armour: Main belt: 83 mm (3.3 in); Deck: 51 mm (2.0 in); Turrets: 51 mm (2.0 in); Director control tower: 102 mm (4.0 in)

INS Mysore was a Fiji-class light cruiser commissioned in the Indian Navy in 1957. She was acquired from the Royal Navy, where she served in World War II as HMS Nigeria.

Mysore was the second cruiser to be purchased by independent India. She was commissioned into the Indian Navy in August 1957. The crest for Mysore depicted the mythological double-headed eagle Gandaberunda from the coat of arms of the former Mysore state. The ship's motto Na bibheti kadachana was taken from the Taittiriya Upanishad.

== Operational history ==
In 1959, Mysore rammed the Royal Navy destroyer Hogue, severely damaging Hogue's bow. In 1969, she collided with the destroyer Rana resulting in the latter being decommissioned and again in 1972 with the frigate Beas. Mysore served as a crucible of training. On her, several Indian naval officers earned their stripes as her successive commanding officers. In 1971 she served as the flagship of the Western Fleet of the Indian Navy and commanded the missile attack on Karachi harbour in December 1971. Later in her life from 1975 onwards Mysore served as a training cruiser for naval cadets.

Mysore was decommissioned on 20 August 1985 and scrapped.

== In popular culture ==
Mysore appears in the 2016 Bollywood movie Rustom, which was based loosely on the popular K. M. Nanavati v. State of Maharashtra case of the 1960s.

The Mysore is a playable, premium ship in the free-to-play game World of Warships.
