= INS Brahmaputra (1957) =

History

India
- Name: INS Brahmaputra
- Namesake: Brahmaputra River
- Builder: John Brown & Company
- Laid down: 20 October 1955
- Launched: 15 March 1957
- Completed: 31 March 1958
- Identification: F31
- Fate: Scrapped 1986

General characteristics
- Class & type: Leopard-class frigate
- Displacement: 2,300 long tons (2,337 t) standard; 2,520 long tons (2,560 t) full load
- Length: 103.6 m (339 ft 11 in) o/a
- Beam: 12.2 metres (40 ft 0 in)
- Draught: 3.6 m (11 ft 10 in)
- Propulsion: 8 × Admiralty Standard Range ASR1 diesels, 14,400 shp (10,738 kW), 2 shafts
- Speed: 25 knots (29 mph; 46 km/h)
- Range: 7,500 nmi (13,900 km; 8,600 mi)
- Complement: 210
- Armament: 2 × twin 4.5 in guns Mark 6; 1 × twin 40 mm Bofors gun; 1 × Squid A/S mortar

INS Brahmaputra (F31) was a Leopard-class frigate of the Indian Navy. She was built by the Scottish shipbuilder John Brown & Company and completed in March 1958. Brahmaputra served during the Indo-Pakistani War of 1965 and the Indo-Pakistani War of 1971. She was scrapped in 1986.

== Construction and design ==
On 28 June 1951, the British Admiralty ordered the fifth anti-aircraft frigate of the Leopard-class for the Royal Navy, to be called HMS Panther. In 1954 the Indian Navy ordered three Leopard-class frigates from the United Kingdom, with Panther, yet to be laid down, transferred to the Indian order as INS Bramaputra.

Brahmaputra was laid down at John Brown's Clydebank shipyard on 20 October 1955 and was launched on 15 March 1957. She was completed on 31 March 1958. She carried pennant number F31.

Brahmaputra was 103.6 metres (339 ft 11 in) long overall and 100.6 metres (330 ft 1 in) between perpendiculars, with a beam of 12.2 metres (40 ft 0 in) and a draught of 3.6 metres (11 ft 10 in). The ship displaced 2,300 long tons (2,300 t) normal and 2,520 long tons (2,560 t) deep load. She was powered by eight Admiralty Standard Range 1 (ASR1) diesel engines, with a total power of 14,400 brake horsepower (10,700 kW), driving two propeller shafts giving a speed of 25 knots (46 km/h; 29 mph).

The ship's main gun armament consisted of two twin 4.5 inch (113 mm) Mark 6 dual-purpose gun turrets, mounted one forward and one aft, with a twin 40mm Bofors mount providing close-in anti-aircraft defence. A single Squid anti submarine mortar was fitted.

== Service ==
=== 1965 War ===
On 17 September 1965, during the Indo-Pakistani War of 1965, the Pakistani submarine Ghazi made a torpedo attack against a target off Bombay that was believed to be INS Brahmaputra. Ghazi' s ship's log recorded three explosions when her torpedoes were due to strike their target, and Ghazi was credited with sinking the Indian frigate. Brahmaputra was however unharmed and was unaware of any attack.

=== 1971 war ===
Brahmaputra took part in amphibious landings at Cox's Bazar on 14/15 December 1971, landing divers in advance of the landing and providing gunfire support to the landings.

=== Training ship ===
In 1978 Bramaputra was converted to a training ship, with a deckhouse housing classrooms replacing the aft 4.5 in turret. She was stricken on 30 June 1986 and scrapped that year.

== Other sources ==
- Blackman, Raymond V.B. (1962). Jane's Fighting Ships 1962–63. London: Sampson Low, Marston & Co., Ltd.
- Blackman, Raymond V.B. (1971). Jane's Fighting Ships 1971–72. London: Sampson Low, Marston & Co., Ltd.
- Cardozo, Ian (2015). The Sinking of INS Khukri: Survivor's Stories. New Delhi: The Lotus Collection. ISBN 978-93-5194-099-9.
- Friedman, Norman (2008). British Destroyers & Frigates: The Second World War and After. Barnsley, UK: Seaforth Publishing. ISBN 978-1-84832-015-4.
- Gardiner, Robert; Chumbley, Stephen, eds. (1995). Conway's All The World's Fighting Ships 1947–1995. Annapolis, Maryland, USA: Naval Institute Press. ISBN 1-55750-132-7.
- Hiranandani, G.M. (2000). Transition to Triumph: Indian Navy 1965–1975. New Delhi: Director Personnel Services (DPS): Naval Headquarters. ISBN 1-897829-72-8.
- Moore, John, ed. (1985). Jane's Fighting Ships 1985–86. London: Jane's Yearbooks. ISBN 0-7106-0814-4.
