= Vijai Singh Shekhawat =

Indian admiral

Admiral V S Shekhawat PVSM, AVSM, VrC, ADC
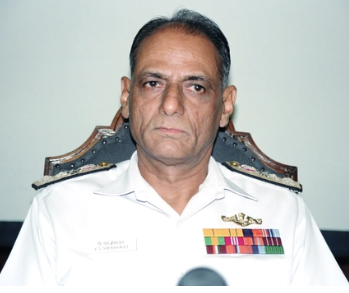

14th Chief of the Naval Staff
- In office 1 October 1993 – 1 October 1996
- President: Shankar Dayal Sharma
- Prime Minister: P. V. Narasimha Rao; Atal Bihari Vajpayee; H. D. Deve Gowda
- Preceded by: Laxminarayan Ramdas
- Succeeded by: Vishnu Bhagwat

Personal details
- Born: 1 October 1936 (age 90) Chittosa, Jhunjhunu, Rajasthan
- Spouse: Binu Shekhawat
- Awards: Param Vishist Seva Medal; Ati Vishist Seva Medal; Vir Chakra
- Nickname: "VP"

Military service
- Allegiance: India
- Branch/service: Indian Navy
- Years of service: 1956–1996
- Rank: Admiral
- Commands: Eastern Navy; Western Fleet; INS Himgiri; INS Karanj; INS Kalvari
- Battles/wars: Indo-Pakistani War of 1971

Admiral Vijai Singh Shekhawat, PVSM, AVSM, VrC, ADC is a former chief of naval staff of the Indian Navy. He was 14th chief of naval staff and served as navy chief from 30 September 1993 to 30 September 1996. Admiral Shekhawat is a patron of the General K.S. Thimayya Memorial Trust.

== Early life and education ==
Shekhawat attended the St. Joseph's Academy and Colonel Brown Cambridge School in Dehradun, Bishop Cotton Boys' School in Bangalore, and St Joseph's College in Darjeeling. He later attended the National Defence Academy in Maharashtra and the US Naval War College in Newport, Rhode Island. Shekhawat was selected for the Joint Services Wing of the National Defence Academy (NDA) in 1952, and was awarded the President's gold medal for the best all-round cadet in December 1953. He was commissioned in 1956.

== Naval career ==
=== Early career ===
Shekhawat received submarine training in the UK from 1963 to 1964 and the USSR from 1966 to 1967, He served as executive and commanding officer for several submarines, including the INS Kalvari and the INS Karanj, which he commissioned and sailed from the Baltic Sea to India. He received the Vir Chakra gallantry award for his service as commander of the Karanj during the Indo-Pakistani War of 1971.

=== Vir Chakra ===
The citation for the Vir Chakra reads as follows:

Gazette Notification: 86 Pres/72 15-7-72

Operation: 1971

CITATION

COMMANDER VIJAI SINGH SHEKHAWAT

(00189-B)

During the operations against Pakistan in December 1971, Commander Vijai Singh Shekhawat was the commanding officer of an Indian naval submarine. Despite the fact that the patrol duties of his ship were such that he was under constant surveillance by enemy air and surface forces, he continued to carry out his hazardous patrol and thereby posed a constant underwater threat to the enemy.

His probes of the near approaches to Karachi obtained vital information for the Indian Navy. Throughout, Commander Shekhawat displayed gallantry, leadership and professional skill of a high order.

Promoted to substantive commander on 31 December 1971, Shekhawat served as director of the Indian Navy Submarine Arm from 1975 to 1977. After attending the US Naval War College from 1977 to 1978, Shekhawat was promoted to captain on 1 July 1978, and served from 1979 to 1981 as the Chief Instructor at the National Defence Academy.

=== Flag rank ===
Shekhawat was promoted to acting rear admiral on 21 June 1984 (substantive from 30 June), and served as the Assistant Chief of Naval Staff. He was given command of the Western Fleet during Operation Brasstacks. He was promoted to vice admiral on 8 August 1988, with appointment as director general of the tri-service Defence Planning Staff. and obtained the rank of flag officer commanding-in-chief of the Eastern Naval Command in December 1990. In 1992, Shekhawat was promoted to the vice chief of the naval staff, and in September 1993 he was again promoted to Chief of the Naval Staff, becoming the first and only till date officer from the submarine branch to become Chief of Naval Staff. Shekhawat retired in 1996.

== Personal life ==
Shekhawat is married to Mrs. Binu Shekhawat and has two sons, one of whom is a pilot with the Indian Navy.

== Awards and decorations ==
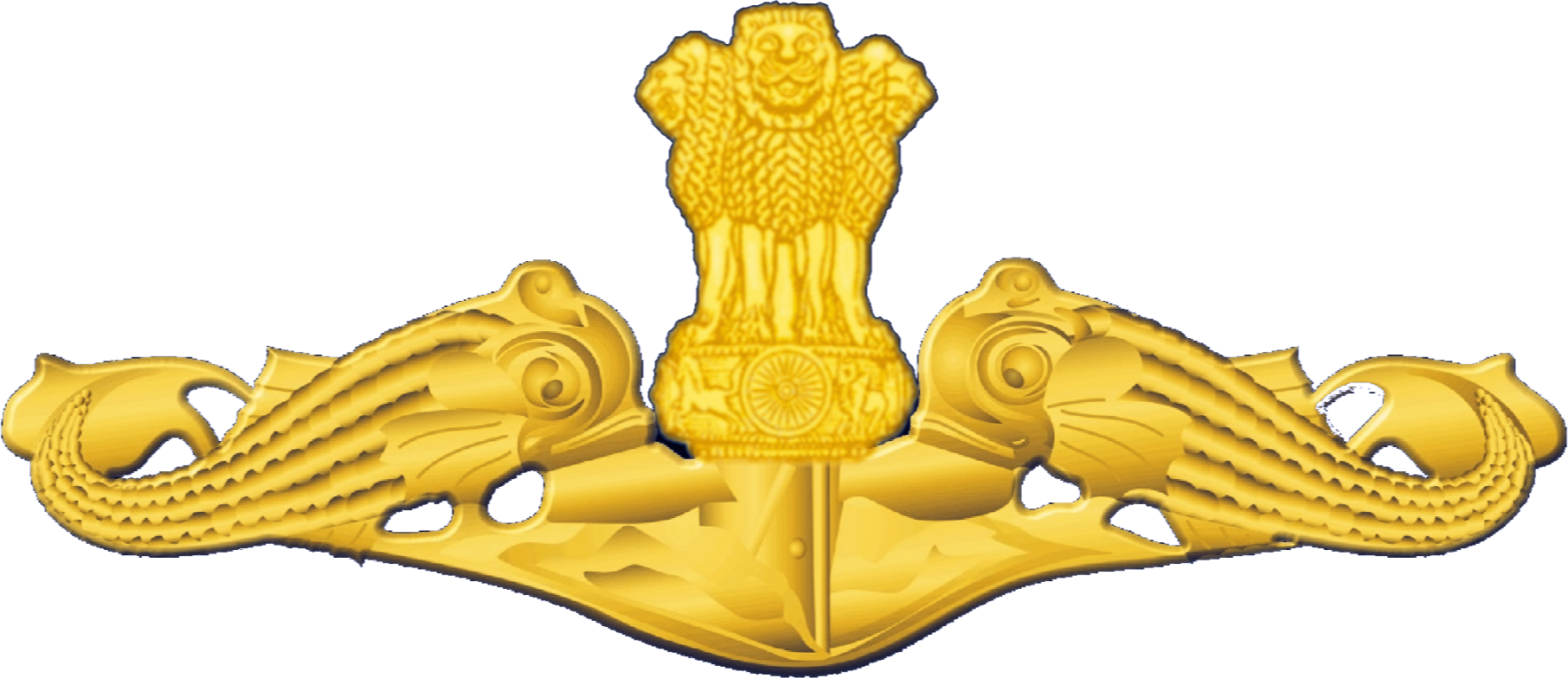

Submariner's (Dolphin) badge
Param Vishisht Seva Medal	Ati Vishisht Seva Medal	Vir Chakra	Samar Seva Star
Poorvi Star	Paschimi Star	Raksha Medal	Sangram Medal
25th Independence Anniversary Medal	30 Years Long Service Medal	20 Years Long Service Medal	9 Years Long Service Medal

Military offices
Preceded by S. C. Chopra	Flag Officer Commanding Western Fleet; 1986–1987	Succeeded by KASZ Raju
Preceded by S. W. Lakhkar	Flag Officer Commanding Maharashtra Naval Area; 1987–1988	Succeeded by P. A. Debrass
Preceded by Laxminarayan Ramdas	Flag Officer Commanding-in-Chief Eastern Naval Command; 1990–1992	Succeeded by B Guha
Preceded by S. P. Govil	Vice Chief of the Naval Staff; 1992–1993	Succeeded by S. K. Chand
Preceded by Laxminarayan Ramdas	Chief of the Naval Staff; 1993–1996	Succeeded by Vishnu Bhagwat
Preceded by Air Chief Marshal S. K. Kaul	Chairman of the Chiefs of Staff Committee; 1995–1996	Succeeded by General Shankar Roychowdhury
