= Soviet submarine B-402 =

Soviet submarine B-402 may refer to one of the following submarines of the Soviet Navy:

- Soviet submarine B-402 (1969), a Foxtrot-class submarine; sold to India as INS Kursura (S20) of the Indian Navy's Kalvari class
- Soviet submarine B-402 (1984), a Kilo-class submarine; probably an active submarine in the Russian Navy
