= Soviet submarine B-405 =

Soviet submarine B-405 may refer to one of the following submarines of the Soviet Navy:

- Soviet submarine B-405 (1968), a Foxtrot-class submarine; sold to India as INS Karanj (S21) of the Indian Navy's Kalvari class
- Soviet submarine B-405 (1990), a Kilo-class submarine; probably an active submarine in the Russian Navy
