= Soviet submarine B-401 =

Soviet submarine B-401 may refer to one of the following submarines of the Soviet Navy:

- Soviet submarine B-401 (1968), a Foxtrot-class submarine; sold to India as INS Khanderi of the Indian Navy's Kalvari class
- Soviet submarine B-401 (1984), a Kilo-class submarine; probably an active submarine in the Russian Navy
