= KASZ Raju =

Indian Navy Officer

Vice Admiral KASZ Raju PVSM, AVSM, NM
- Military career
- Allegiance: India
- Branch: Indian Navy
- Service years: 1958–1994
- Rank: Vice Admiral
- Commands: Western Naval Command; Southern Naval Command; Western Fleet; INS Hansa; INS Vikrant; INS Deepak; INS Tir (K256)
- Conflicts: World War II; Indo-Pakistani War of 1971
- Awards: Param Vishisht Seva Medal; Ati Vishisht Seva Medal; Nao Sena Medal

Vice Admiral Kankipati Appala Satyanarayana Zagapathi 'KASZ' Raju, PVSM, AVSM, NM is a former Flag officer in the Indian Navy. He last served as the Flag Officer Commanding-in-Chief Western Naval Command, from 1992 to 1994. A naval aviator, he was part of the Navy's first naval air squadron INAS 300 and was embarked on the Navy's first aircraft carrier INS Vikrant. During the Indo-Pakistani War of 1971, he was the executive officer of the Leopard-class frigate INS Brahmaputra (1957), for which he was awarded the Nao Sena Medal. He later commanded the Western Fleet and the Southern Naval Command.

== Early life and education ==
Raju joined the Rashtriya Indian Military College, Dehradun in 1948. After passing the entrance examination, he joined the 10th course of the Joint Services Wing in Dehradun in 1953. In December 1954, the National Defence Academy (NDA) was commissioned in Khadakvasla, near Pune. The 10th course moved to NDA when parts of the academy were under construction. After graduating from NDA, Raju was commissioned in the Indian Navy on 1 July 1958.

== Naval career ==
=== Early career ===
Raju trained as a naval aviator and joined the first squadron of the Indian Navy – INAS 300. He flew the Hawker Sea Hawk aircraft. In February 1961, India's first aircraft carrier INS Vikrant was commissioned in Belfast. The squadron was based out of RNAS Brawdy in Wales. In August, the Sea Hawks of INAS 300 embarked on the Vikrant in the English Channel. After work-up and sea trials in the Mediterranean, Vikrant entered home waters in November. Aircraft of the Indian Air Force welcomed the ship and INAS 300, along with INAS 310 put up a flying demonstration. The squadron then disembarked and moved to Sulur Air Force Station.

On 1 January 1968, Raju was promoted to the acting rank of Lieutenant Commander. He then served on the Naval air station INS Garuda. In June 1969, he was selected to attend the Defence Services Staff College (DSSC), Wellington in the course commencing in January 1970. After graduating from DSSC, Raju was appointed executive officer of the Leopard-class frigate INS Brahmaputra (1957).

=== Indo-Pakistani War of 1971 ===
In mid-1971, Vikrant along with the frigates Brahmaputra and INS Beas (1958) were moved from the Western Fleet to the Eastern Naval Command. With this, on 1 November 1971, the Eastern Fleet came into existence, under the command of Rear Admiral S. H. Sarma. The Brahmaputra was deployed in the Bay of Bengal. She participated in the bombardment of Chittagong. On 14 December, Vikrant moved to Paradip for refuelling and the Flag Officer Commanding Eastern Fleet transferred his flag to the Brahmaputra. For his participation in the war as the XO of Brahmaputra, Raju was awarded the Nau Sena Medal for gallantry.

=== Post-war career ===
After the war, Raju was promoted to the rank of Commander. In 1973, he commanded the Inter-services guard of honour during the Independence Day celebrations at Red Fort. He then took command of the River-class frigate INS Tir (K256). Tir was converted into a training ship and was part of 1 Training Squadron with the erstwhile flagship INS Delhi (C74) as the lead ship.

Raju subsequently moved to Naval HQ as a Joint Director. In 1979, he was part of a delegation headed by the Deputy Prime Minister and Minister of Defence Jagjivan Ram to Bulgaria, Romania and the United Kingdom. He then took command of the fleet tanker INS Deepak. On 27 August 1982, Raju was appointed the 15th commanding officer of INS Vikrant and took over from Captain A. Ghosh. During his command, the Sea Harrier aircraft were inducted and the first deck landing took place on 20 December 1983. After a two-and-a-half year stint as CO Vikrant, Raju was appointed Commanding Officer of the naval air station INS Hansa in Goa.

=== Flag Rank ===
In 1985, Raju was promoted to the rank of acting Rear Admiral and appointed Assistant Chief of Personnel (ACOP) at Naval HQ. As ACOP he headed the career planning department. On 5 July 1987, he was appointed the next Flag Officer Commanding Western Fleet (FOCWF). On 9 July, he took over command from Rear Admiral Vijai Singh Shekhawat. During his tenure, the Indian Navy's second aircraft carrier INS Viraat (R22) reached India. The Prime Minister of India Rajiv Gandhi welcomed the carrier when it reached Mumbai. As the FOCWF, Raju was among the senior officers welcoming Viraat to India. Under his tenure, two missile frigates also joined the fleet and became efficient units.

After close to two years in command of the western fleet, Raju was promoted to the rank of Vice Admiral and moved to Naval HQ as Deputy Chief of the Naval Staff. In December 1990, he was appointed Flag Officer Commanding-in-Chief Southern Naval Command, succeeding Vice Admiral S.P. Govil. After he took over, he was tasked with an in-depth study of the command structure of the Indian Navy. The VAdm KASZ Raju Committee report recommended multiple changes in the structure at the naval commands as well as at the Naval HQ. It also recommended conversion of the Southern Naval Command from a training command to an operational command. However, these recommendations were not implemented.

On 31 August 1992, Raju was appointed Flag Officer Commanding-in-Chief Western Naval Command, succeeding Vice Admiral H. Johnson. He led the Western Naval Command for over two-and-a-half years. On 31 December 1994, he relinquished command, handing over to Vice Admiral Vishnu Bhagwat. Raju retired from the Indian Navy on the same day after 37 years of service.

== Bibliography ==
- Hiranandani, G. M. (1999), Transition to Triumph: History of the Indian Navy, 1965–1975, Lancer International, ISBN 978-1897829721
- Hiranandani, G. M. (2010), Transition to Guardianship: The Indian Navy 1991-2000, Lancer InterConsult, Incorporated, ISBN 978-1935501268
- Krishnan, Arjun (2011), A Sailor's story, Punya Publications, ISBN 978-8189534141
- Singh, Satyindra (1991), Blueprint to bluewater: The Indian Navy, 1951-65, Lancer International, ISBN 978-8170621485

Military offices
Preceded by A. Ghosh	Commanding Officer INS Vikrant; 1982–1984	Succeeded by Santosh Kumar Gupta
Preceded by Vijai Singh Shekhawat	Flag Officer Commanding Western Fleet; 1987–1989	Succeeded by I. Bedi
Preceded by R. P. Sawhney	Deputy Chief of the Naval Staff; 1989–1990	Succeeded by B. Guha
Preceded by S. P. Govil	Flag Officer Commanding-in-Chief Southern Naval Command; 1990–1992	Succeeded by S. K. Chand
Preceded by H. Johnson	Flag Officer Commanding-in-Chief Western Naval Command; 1992–1994	Succeeded by Vishnu Bhagwat
