= Vishnu Bhagwat =

Indian admiral

Admiral Vishnu Bhagwat PVSM, AVSM

15th Chief of the Naval Staff
- In office 1 October 1996 – 30 December 1998
- President: Shankar Dayal Sharma; K. R. Narayanan
- Prime Minister: H. D. Deve Gowda; Inder Kumar Gujral; Atal Bihari Vajpayee
- Preceded by: Vijai Singh Shekhawat
- Succeeded by: Sushil Kumar Isaacs

Personal details
- Born: October 1939 (age 86)
- Occupation: Social service, writing, lecturing
- Awards: Param Vishist Seva Medal; Ati Vishist Seva Medal

Military service
- Allegiance: India
- Branch/service: Indian Navy
- Rank: Admiral
- Commands: Western Navy; Eastern Fleet
- Battles/wars: Indo-Pakistani War of 1971

Vishnu Bhagwat, PVSM, AVSM is a former Chief of the Naval Staff of India.

He is the first and only Chief of Naval Staff who was relieved from office while still serving and stripped of Admiral rank as punitive measure.

== Career and achievements ==
He went to School at The Lawrence School, Sanawar on a Govt. of India scholarship for talented children. Vishnu Bhagwat was commissioned into the Indian Navy on 1 January 1960. A graduate of the National Defence Academy, he was awarded the Telescope for the Best All-Round Cadet on the training ship, INS Tir and the Sword of Honour for the Best All-Round Midshipman of the Fleet.

In his 36 years of service he had a vast and varied experience in combat operations, warship production, acquisition and acceptance, personnel management and command. He was actively associated with the 1961 Goa Liberation Operations. He was promoted to lieutenant-commander on 1 April 1970. During the 1971 Indo–Pak war his ship was in the escort groups for missile boats responsible for humbling the adversary. A Specialist in Communication and Electronic Warfare, he was Flag Lt. to Chief of the Naval Staff in 1968–70 and Naval Assistant to Chief of the Naval Staff in 1986–87.

Bhagwat was promoted to commander on 1 January 1976. He completed his first major command in INS Amini with the Western Fleet before being assigned as the Fleet Operations Officer of the same Fleet (1978–79). Promoted to captain on 1 January 1982, he commissioned the third Rajput class guided missile destroyer (DDG), INS Ranjit in September 1983 and was in command for 2½ years during which the ship set new fleet standards/records in weapons, sensors and operations.

On promotion to Flag rank as rear admiral on 11 January 1988, he served as additional DG Defence Planning Staff, Chief of Staff of Western Naval Command and commanded the Eastern Fleet. He was promoted to vice-admiral on 5 October 1992. He was Deputy Chief of the Naval Staff for two years at the Naval Headquarters. Prior to taking over as the Chief of the Naval staff on 1 October 1996, he was Flag Officer Commanding-in-Chief Western Naval Command.

In his appointments in Flag rank, Bhagwat made dedicated efforts to enhance self-reliance in defence production and development of indigenous skills and technological know-how. He played a key role in ushering the era of 'computerisation' in the Navy. He was inspired by the rigorous technological approach adopted by United States Navy Admiral Hyman Rickover "Father of the Nuclear Navy" and Soviet Admiral of the Fleet Sergey Georgiyevich Gorshkov. In an article authored in 2014 he cautioned that relying on an ad hoc decision-making process, without a carefully considered overall perspective on the implications of FDI in armament technology, is not a substitute for building a comprehensive plan and robust policy for the country's inclusive growth, development and security.

An alumnus of the National Defence Academy, Khadakwasla Pune, Defence Services Staff College, Wellington, Tamil Nadu, National Defence College New Delhi, Bhagwat is a recipient of Ati Vishisht Seva Medal (AVSM) in 1986 and was conferred the Param Vishisht Seva Medal (PVSM) on 26 January 1996.

He is an author of a number of papers, articles and has written two well known books, namely An Eye Opening as I Saw and Betrayal of the Armed Forces – The Inside Truth

== Dismissal ==
Vishnu Bhagwat was appointed chief of naval staff on 30 September 1996 and was relieved of office on 30 December 1998 under Article 310 of the Constitution of India. The unprecedented and much publicised row between the government and the admiral began after the Cabinet appointments committee appointed Vice-Admiral Harinder Singh as deputy chief of the naval staff. Refusing to accept the Cabinet order, Admiral Bhagwat went public with his opposition to the government's decision. The government said that a series of actions from Admiral Bhagwat "were in deliberate defiance of the government." The Supreme Court of India later dismissed a petition by the former Navy chief challenging the Government's decision to dismiss him from service and the punitive measure to strip him of the title of Admiral.

== Later life ==
He moved to Mumbai with his wife.

== Other controversies ==
After Bhagwat's dismissal, All India Anna Dravida Munnetra Kazhagam leader J Jayalalitha, who had offered support to the ruling BJP-led coalition government at the centre, demanded that the former naval chief should be reinstated; Defence Minister George Fernandes should quit or be relieved of his portfolio; and a Joint Parliamentary Committee probe should be ordered. The government rejected her demands. J Jayalalitha met President K R Narayanan on 12 April 1999 and withdrew the 18-MP support to the Bharatiya Janata Party led coalition government.

In 2003, Bhagwat reportedly questioned installation of Veer Sarvarkar's portrait in the Central Hall of Parliament of India. This invited the ire of the Shiv Sena, a political party of India, and they gheraoed and assaulted Bhagwat.

== Personal life ==
He is married to Niloufer Bhagwat, who was a lawyer. He has a son and a daughter.

== Awards and decorations ==

| Param Vishisht Seva Medal | Ati Vishisht Seva Medal | General Service Medal | Samar Seva Star |
| Poorvi Star | Paschimi Star | Raksha Medal | Sangram Medal |
| 25th Anniversary of Independence Medal | 30 Years Long Service Medal | 20 Years Long Service Medal | 9 Years Long Service Medal |

Military offices
| Preceded by Vijai Singh Shekhawat | Chief of the Naval Staff; 1996–1998 | Succeeded by Sushil Kumar |
| Preceded by KASZ Raju | Flag Officer Commanding-in-Chief Western Naval Command; 1994–1996 | Succeeded by K. K. Kohli |
| Preceded by Pl S. Das | Flag Officer Commanding Eastern Fleet; 1991–1992 | Succeeded by P. J. Jacob |
