= Santosh Gupta =

Santosh Gupta may refer to:

- Santosh Gupta (journalist) (1925–2004), Bangladeshi journalist and writer
- Santosh Kumar Gupta (born 1936), Indian Navy officer
