= Laxminarayan Ramdas =

Indian admiral (1933–2024)

Admiral Laxminarayan Ramdas PVSM, AVSM, VrC, VSM, ADC
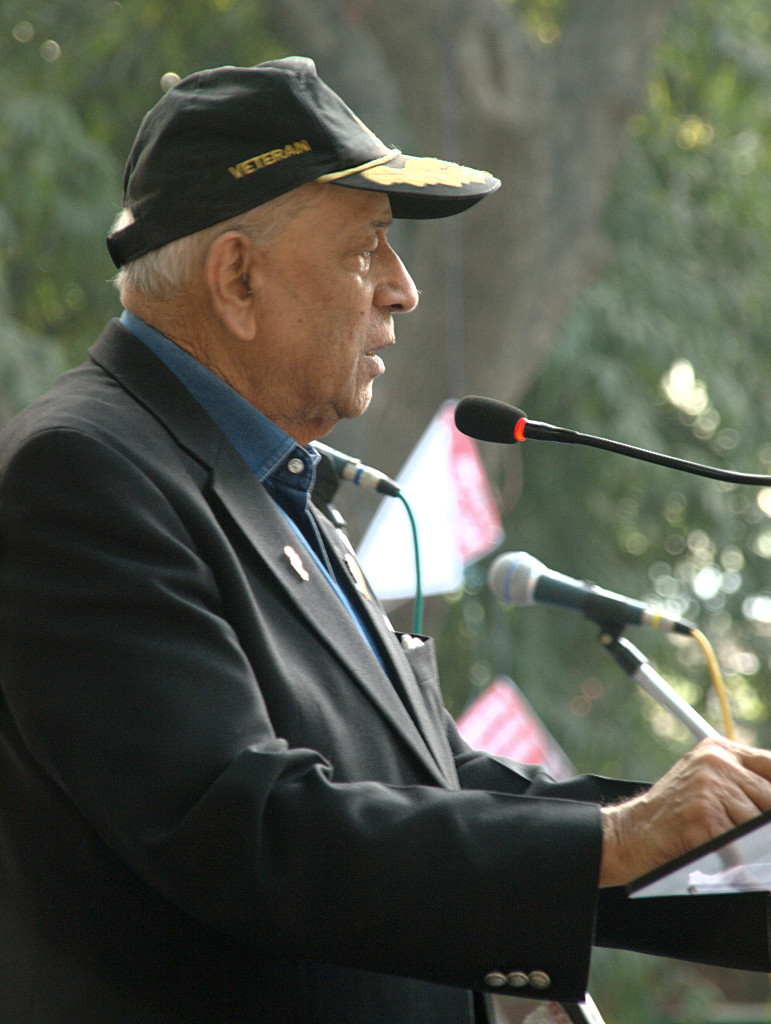
- Ramdas in 2016

13th Chief of Naval Staff
- In office 1 December 1990 – 30 September 1993
- President: Ramaswamy Venkataraman; Shankar Dayal Sharma
- Prime Minister: Chandra Shekhar; P. V. Narasimha Rao
- Preceded by: Jayant Ganpat Nadkarni
- Succeeded by: Vijai Singh Shekhawat

Personal details
- Born: 5 September 1933 Bombay, Bombay Presidency, British India (present-day Mumbai, Maharashtra, India)
- Died: 15 March 2024 (aged 90) Secunderabad, Telangana, India
- Spouse: Lalita Ramdas
- Relations: Admiral Ram Dass Katari (Father-in-law)
- Awards: Param Vishist Seva Medal; Ati Vishist Seva Medal; Vir Chakra; Vishisht Seva Medal; Ramon Magsaysay Award

Military service
- Allegiance: India
- Branch/service: Indian Navy
- Years of service: 1953–1993
- Rank: Admiral
- Commands: Eastern Naval Command; Southern Naval Command; Eastern Fleet; INS Beas (1958)
- Battles/wars: Indo-Pakistani War of 1971

Admiral Laxminarayan Ramdas, PVSM, AVSM, VrC, VSM, ADC (5 September 1933 – 15 March 2024) was an Indian naval officer who served as the 13th Chief of Naval Staff, from 1990 to 1993. Ramdas joined the Indian Navy in 1953, and served as the flag lieutenant to Admiral Ram Dass Katari, the first Indian Chief of the Naval Staff. During the Indo-Pakistani war of 1971, he was involved in a naval blockade of East Pakistan, hindering attempts to evacuate 93,000 troops and leading to East Pakistan's surrender, for which he was awarded the Vir Chakra.

== Early life and education ==
Laxminarayan Ramdas was born on 5 September 1933 into a Tamil Brahmin family. He grew up in Matunga in Mumbai. He attended the Cambridge School Srinivaspuri in Delhi. After passing his Senior Cambridge, Ramdas joined the 1st course of the Joint Services Wing (JSW) in Dehradun in January 1949. He was part of 'B' squadron of 4 Division. The JSW later moved to Khadakwasla in Pune and was christened the National Defence Academy in 1954.

== Career ==
Ramdas was commissioned into the Indian Navy on 1 September 1953, with seniority as a sub-lieutenant from the same date. He then attended the Royal Naval College, Greenwich from December 1953 to May 1955, where he trained as a communication specialist.

After his return to India, he was promoted to lieutenant on 16 August 1955. He then served as the Flag lieutenant to the first Indian Chief of the Naval Staff Admiral Ram Dass Katari.

Ramdas was promoted to lieutenant-commander on 16 August 1963. Ramdas was promoted to Commander on 30 June 1969; he was appointed the first Officer-in-charge Naval Academy. He went on to establish and head the Naval Academy in Kochi, Kerala, for which he was awarded the Vishisht Seva Medal on 26 January 1971. The Naval Academy moved to Goa in 1986 and to Ezhimala in Kerala in 2009 as the Indian Naval Academy.

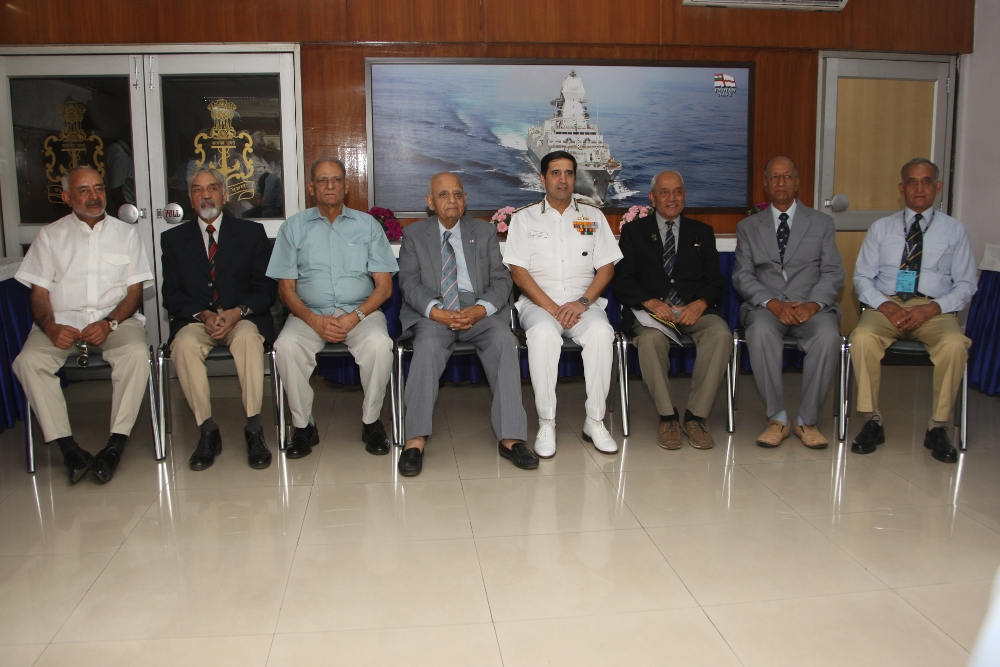
Ramdas (3rd from right) with former chiefs and Admiral Robin K. Dhowan at the Conclave of Chiefs, 2015

=== Indo-Pakistani War of 1971 ===
During the Indo-Pakistani War of 1971, as part of the newly formed Eastern Fleet, whilst in command of INS Beas, Admiral Ramdas took part in the most effective naval blockade of East Pakistan which frustrated Pakistan's attempt to evacuate 93,000 of their troops who eventually surrendered to the Indian Forces. INS Beas also captured a large number of ships carrying contraband to East Pakistan, bombarded Cox's Bazar and took part in the landing and other operations in an area which had been mined. He was awarded the Vir Chakra, the third-highest gallantry award.

The citation for the Vir Chakra reads as follows:

Gazette Notification: 86 Pres/72 15-7-72

Date of Award: 1971

CITATION

COMMANDER LAXMINARAYAN RAMDAS, VSM

00132-Z

During the operations against Pakistan in December 1971, Commander Laxminarayan Ramdas was the commanding officer of an Indian naval unit of Eastern Fleet. Throughout the period of operations, he was called upon to operate within enemy waters, where there was constant danger to his ship from enemy mines and submarines. Undeterred, he carried out continuous probes into the enemy defended harbours in Bangladesh and inflicted heavy damage on the enemy. During one of the sorties, an enemy submarine was sighted close to his ship. He attacked the submarine repeatedly, which was presumably destroyed.

Throughout, Commander Laxrminarayan Ramdas displayed gallantry, leadership and devotion to duty of a high order.

=== Post-war career ===
After the war, Ramdas commanded a Patrol Vessel Squadron in the Indian Navy. He later served as Naval Attaché in Germany for three years, and was promoted to captain on 1 July 1976.

=== Flag rank ===
Ramdas was promoted to acting Rear Admiral 7 April 1981 (substantive from 1 June 1981) and took over as Assistant Chief of Naval Staff (Operations) at NHQ. On 29 June 1983, he was appointed Flag Officer Commanding Eastern Fleet (FOCEF), and also took command of the Eastern Fleet.

Ramdas was promoted to Vice Admiral on 1 April 1985 and appointed Controller of Warship Production & Acquisition (CWP&A). On 20 February 1986, he took over as Deputy Chief of Naval Staff (DNCS). After an eighteen-month stint as DCNS, Ramdas was appointed Flag Officer Commanding-in-Chief Southern Naval Command. He took command from Vice Admiral Gulab Mohanlal Hiranandani at Kochi. In February 1989, he moved to Vizag as the Flag Officer Commanding-in-Chief Eastern Naval Command. On 26 January 1989, he was awarded the Param Vishisht Seva Medal. He was at the helm of the Eastern Naval Command for about twenty months.

=== Chief of Naval Staff ===
Ramdas was appointed the next Chief of the Naval Staff, succeeding Admiral Jayant Ganpat Nadkarni. He took over as CNS on 30 November 1990. The Chief of the Army Staff was General Sunith Francis Rodrigues. On 1 August 1991, Air Chief Marshal Nirmal Chandra Suri took over as the Chief of the Air Staff. All the three service chiefs were from the same course, the 1st JSW, a first in India. On 30 June 1993, with the superannuation of General S. F. Rodrigues, Ramdas took over as Chairman of the Chiefs of Staff Committee.

== Personal life ==
Ramdas was married to Lalita Ramdas (née Katari), daughter of Admiral Ram Dass Katari, the first Indian Chief of Naval Staff. He served as the Aam Aadmi Party's internal lokpal. His younger daughter, Kavita Ramdas, is the senior advisor to the President of the Ford Foundation and had previously served for many years as country representative of the Ford Foundation in India. Kavita Ramdas is married to Zulfiqar Ahmad, a Pakistani national who is a peace activist.

== Retirement ==
After retirement, Ramdas took up residence at Alibag. He together with his wife, then devoted themselves to a variety of humanitarian causes.

The couple also intervened in military matters. They were part of the group which filed a PIL in the Supreme Court of India against the appointment of the then Lt. Gen. Bikram Singh for the post of Chief of Army Staff.

The couple opposed the establishment of the Kudankulam Nuclear Power Plant in Tamil Nadu. For his efforts to demilitarise and denuclearize South Asia, and his efforts to prevent the building of the Kudankulam reactor, Ramdas was awarded the Ramon Magsaysay Award for peace in 2004.

Ramdas died on 15 March 2024, at the age of 90.

Military offices
Preceded by Sunith Francis Rodrigues	Chairman of the Chiefs of Staff Committee; 1 July 1993 – 30 September 1993	Succeeded by Bipin Chandra Joshi
Preceded by Jayant Ganpat Nadkarni	Chief of the Naval Staff; 1990–1993	Succeeded by Vijai Singh Shekhawat
Preceded by S. C. Chopra	Flag Officer Commanding-in-Chief Eastern Naval Command; 1989–1990	Succeeded by Vijai Singh Shekhawat
Preceded by Gulab Mohanlal Hiranandani	Flag Officer Commanding-in-Chief Southern Naval Command; 1987–1989	Succeeded by R. P. Sawhney
Preceded by S Jain	Deputy Chief of the Naval Staff; 1986–1987	Succeeded by R. P. Sawhney
Preceded by I. J. S. Khurana	Flag Officer Commanding Eastern Fleet; 1983–1985	Succeeded by S. P. Govil
