= Jayant Ganpat Nadkarni =

Indian Navy admiral (1931–2018)

Admiral J G Nadkarni PVSM, AVSM, NM, VSM, ADC
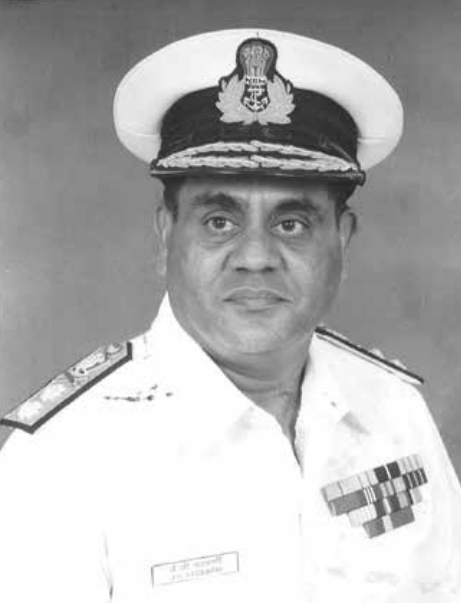

14th Chief of the Naval Staff
- In office 1 December 1987 – 30 November 1990
- President: Ramaswamy Venkataraman
- Prime Minister: Rajiv Gandhi; V. P. Singh
- Preceded by: Radhakrishna Hariram Tahiliani
- Succeeded by: Laxminarayan Ramdas

Personal details
- Born: 5 December 1931
- Died: 2 July 2018 (aged 86)
- Awards: Param Vishisht Seva Medal; Ati Vishisht Seva Medal; Nausena Medal; Vishisht Seva Medal

Military service
- Allegiance: India
- Branch/service: Indian Navy
- Years of service: 1949–1990
- Rank: Admiral
- Commands: Eastern Naval Command; Western Fleet; INS Delhi (1948); INS Talwar (1959)
- Battles/wars: Liberation of Goa; Indo-Pakistani War of 1965; Indo-Pakistani War of 1971

Admiral Jayant Ganpat "Podgy" Nadkarni, PVSM, AVSM, NM, VSM, ADC (5 December 1931 – 2 July 2018) was an Indian Navy Admiral who served as the 12th Chief of the Naval Staff of the Indian Navy from 1 December 1987 to 30 November 1990.

== Early life and education ==
Nadkarni was born on 5 December 1931.

He was a graduate of the Defence Services Staff College, Wellington and the Naval War College.

== Naval career ==
Nadkarni completed training at TS Dufferin and joined the Royal Indian Navy in March 1949. He received his basic training at Royal Naval College, Dartmouth, on the training cruiser HMS Devonshire (39) and at other establishments of the Royal Navy. He specialized in navigation and direction. Commissioned on 1 September 1951, he was confirmed as a sub-lieutenant on 16 May 1953.

Promoted to lieutenant-commander on 16 May 1961, Nadkarni was the Navigating Officer of Cruiser INS Delhi during Liberation of Goa operations. Promoted to commander on 30 June 1967, he served as the commanding officer of INS Talwar (F140) and INS Delhi (C74). He was promoted to captain on 30 June 1973. His service ashore included Chief Instructor (Navy) at Defence Services Staff College, Wellington and Chief Instructor Navy at the National Defence College.

=== Flag rank ===
As a Rear Admiral, he was appointed the Flag Officer Commanding Western Fleet (FOCWF) on 30 May 1981. He subsequently was promoted to the rank of Vice Admiral and appointed Chief of Personnel at Naval Headquarters (NHQ). He also served as the Flag Officer Commanding-in-Chief (FOC-IN-C), Eastern Naval Command before being appointed the Vice Chief of the Naval Staff (VCNS). On 1 December 1987, he took command as the 14th Chief of the Naval Staff (CNS) until his retirement on 30 November 1990.

== Awards and decorations ==
Nadkarni was a recipient of the Param Vishisht Seva Medal, Ati Vishisht Seva Medal, Nausena Medal and the Vishisht Seva Medal for his distinguished service.

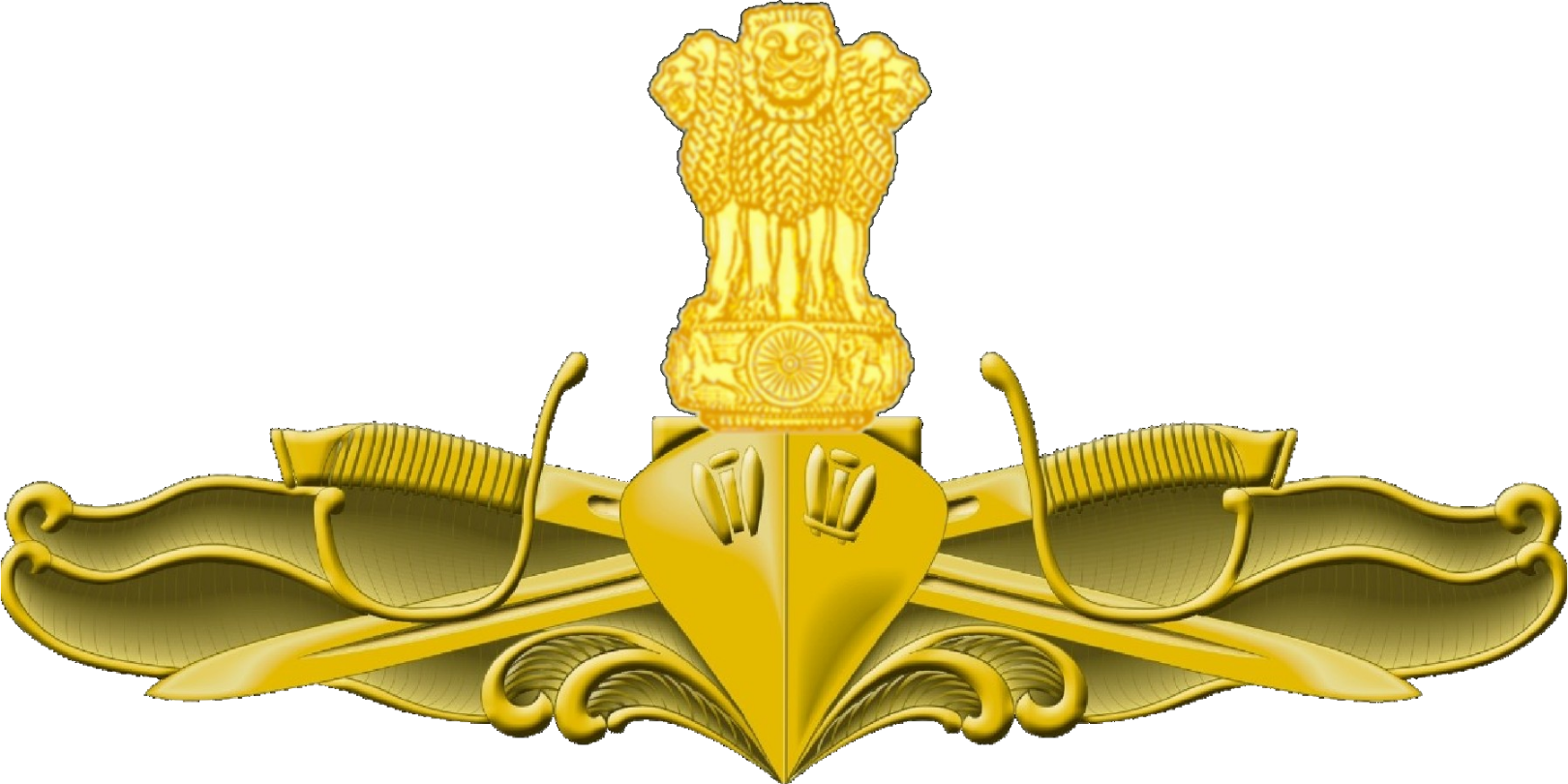

Surface warfare badge
| Param Vishisht Seva Medal | Ati Vishisht Seva Medal | Nao Sena Medal | Vishisht Seva Medal |
| General Service Medal 1947 | Paschimi Star | Raksha Medal | Sangram Medal |
| Videsh Seva Medal | 25th Independence Anniversary Medal | | 30 Years Long Service Medal |
| | 20 Years Long Service Medal | 9 Years Long Service Medal | |

== Personal life and death ==
Nadkarni married Vimal Divekar in 1956. The couple had two sons, one of whom is the retired Rear Admiral Ravindra Jayant Nadkarni. Nadkarni died on 2 July 2018 at INHS Asvini, aged 86.

Military offices
| Preceded by Krishnaswamy Sundarji | Chairman of the Chiefs of Staff Committee; 1 July 1988 – 30 November 1990 | Succeeded by Surinder Mehra |
| Preceded by Radhakrishna Hariram Tahiliani | Chief of the Naval Staff; 1987–1990 | Succeeded by Laxminarayan Ramdas |
| Preceded by M. K. Roy | Flag Officer Commanding-in-Chief Eastern Naval Command; 1984–1986 | Succeeded by S. C. Chopra |
| Preceded by S. L. Sethi | Chief of Personnel; 1982–1984 | Succeeded by S. M. Gadihoke |
| Preceded by Subimal Mookerjee | Flag Officer Commanding Western Fleet; 1981–1982 | Succeeded by K. K. Nayyar |
