= Mark Pizey =

Royal Navy Admiral (1899–1993)

Admiral Sir Mark Pizey GBE CB DSO* DL
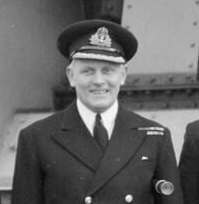
- Pizey in 1943

Chief of the Naval Staff, Indian Navy
- In office 1 April 1955 – 21 July 1955
- President: Rajendra Prasad
- Prime Minister: Jawaharlal Nehru
- Preceded by: Office Established (himself as Commander-in-Chief, Indian Navy
- Succeeded by: Stephen Hope Carlill

Commander-in-Chief, Indian Navy
- In office 13 October 1951 – 31 March 1955
- President: Rajendra Prasad
- Prime Minister: Jawaharlal Nehru
- Preceded by: Edward Parry
- Succeeded by: Office Replaced by office of Chief of the Naval Staff (India)

Personal details
- Born: 17 June 1899 Axbridge, Somerset
- Died: 17 May 1993 (aged 93) Burnham-on-Sea
- Awards: Knight Grand Cross of the Order of the British Empire; Companion of the Order of the Bath; Distinguished Service Order & Bar; Mentioned in Despatches

Military service
- Allegiance: United Kingdom; Dominion of India; India
- Branch/service: Royal Navy; Indian Navy
- Years of service: 1912–1958
- Rank: Admiral
- Commands: Commander-in-Chief, Plymouth; Chief of Naval Staff of the Indian Navy; HMS President; HMS Tyne; HMS Campbell; HMS Ausonia; HMS Fortune; HMS Boreas; HMS Torrid
- Battles/wars: First World War; Second World War

Admiral Sir Charles Thomas Mark Pizey GBE CB DSO* DL (17 June 1899 – 17 May 1993) was a Royal Navy officer who served as the last Commander-in-Chief and first Chief of Naval Staff of the Indian Navy from 1951 to 1955.

== Early life and career ==
Pizey was born in Axbridge, Somerset, the son of the Rev. Charles Edward Pizey (1853–1932), and Geraldine Fowle (1866–1949). He joined the Royal Navy in 1912 and served as a midshipman aboard HMS Conway and HMS Revenge during the First World War. He was promoted to sub-lieutenant on 15 December 1918 and to lieutenant on 15 December 1920, serving on HMS Danae from 1921 to 1923. Pizey then served as a First Lieutenant, first aboard HMS Violent in the Atlantic Fleet from 1924 to 1925, and then aboard HMS Winchelsea in the Mediterranean from 1926 to 1927.

He was promoted to lieutenant commander on 15 December 1928. and served from 1929 to 1930 as Flag Lieutenant-Commander to Vice Admiral Sir W.A. Howard Kelly in the Mediterranean, aboard the battleship HMS Revenge. From 1930 to 1932 he commanded the destroyers HMS Torrid and HMS Boreas. He was promoted to commander on 31 December 1933. From 1935 to 1937, he was the Executive Officer aboard HMS Woolwich in the Mediterranean, and then commanded the destroyer HMS Fortune in the Home Fleet from 1938 to 1939.

== Second World War ==
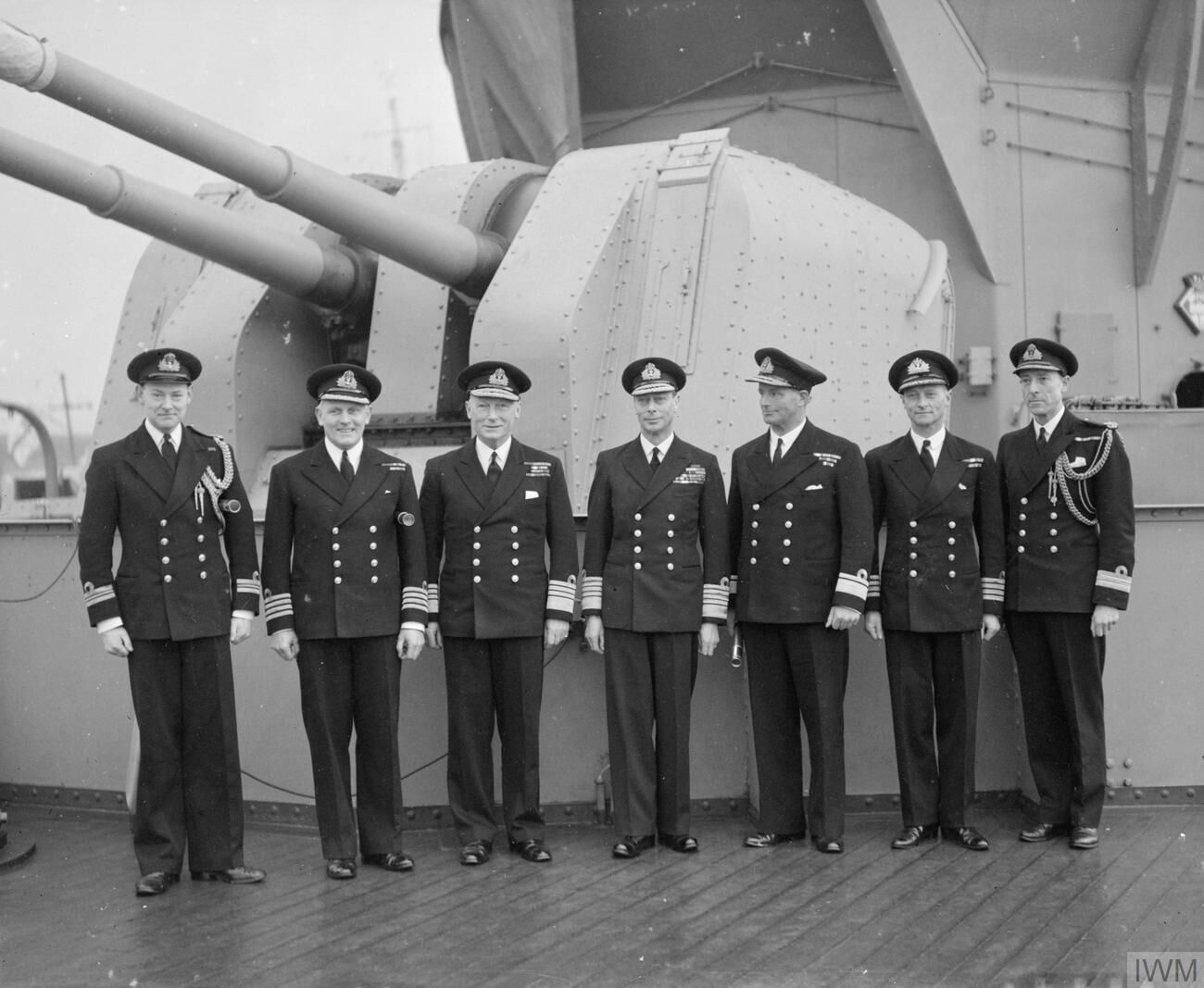
Pizey (second from left) with King George VI (centre) aboard HMS Tyne in March 1943

In June 1939, Pizey was promoted to captain. From 1939 to 1940, he commanded the armed merchant cruiser HMS Ausonia as part of the Atlantic convoys. From 1940 to 1942, he commanded the destroyer HMS Campbell in the Channel and North Sea, seeing action against the German battleships Gneisenau and Scharnhorst as well as the heavy cruiser Prinz Eugen, for which he was appointed a Companion of the Bath on 27 March 1942 and was also awarded a Distinguished Service Order (DSO) and was mentioned in despatches.

In July 1942, he was given the command of a destroyer depot ship, HMS Tyne, and served as a chief staff officer to a Rear Admiral in charge of protecting Soviet convoys in the North Sea. For this service, he was awarded a bar to his DSO (i.e. awarded the DSO for a second time) on 27 November 1942.

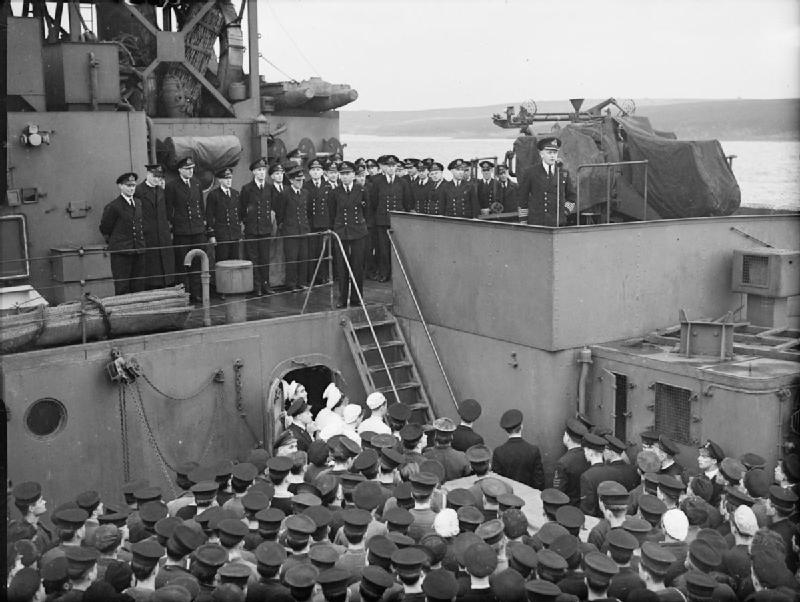
Pizey addresses the crew of HMS Tyne before his departure to take up command of HMS President. c. December 1943

In December 1943, Pizey was appointed Director of Operations Division (Home) for the Admiralty, commanding HMS President. He served in this capacity until the end of the war.

== Postwar career ==
In 1946, Pizey was appointed a commodore and appointed Chief of Staff to the Commander-in-Chief, Home Fleet, serving aboard HMS Nelson. He was promoted to rear admiral in 1948 and served as Senior Naval Liaison Officer and Chief of UK Services Liaison Staff, Australia, aboard HMS Terror (RN base, Singapore). From 1950 to 1951, he served as Flag Officer Commanding, First Cruiser Squadron, aboard HMS Liverpool. On 30 November 1951, he was promoted to vice admiral.

In October 1951, Pizey replaced Vice Admiral Edward Parry as the last Commander-in-Chief of the Indian Navy. He was knighted with the KBE in the Coronation Honours List of 1953, and was promoted to admiral on 31 December 1954 (seniority from 16 December). In April 1955, Pizey became the first Chief of Naval Staff of the Indian Navy, which had replaced the former designation of Commander-in-Chief, Indian Navy. He was honoured with the Order of the People's Army upon the state visit of Josip Broz Tito to India.

Pizey was succeeded in his post by Vice Admiral Stephen Hope Carlill in July 1955. From later that year he served as Commander-in-Chief, Plymouth. He was promoted to a Knight Grand Cross of the Order of the British Empire in the 1957 New Year Honours, and retired in 1958. In 1962, he was appointed a Deputy Lieutenant of the County of Somerset.

== Personal life and death ==
In 1928, Pizey married Phyllis May D'Angibau (27 November 1904 – 4 April 1993). The couple had two daughters:

- Pamela Mary, who married Lieutenant Commander James Barry Armstrong Hawkins MBE
- Sarah Margaret, who married Lieutenant Commander James Alexander Pountney Coats (1927–1993)

Sir Mark Pizey died at Burnham-on-Sea, Somerset on 17 May 1993, aged 93. His wife had died the previous month at the age of 88.

Military offices
Preceded by Sir Edward Parry	Commander-in-Chief, Indian Navy; October 1951 – March 1955	Succeeded by Abolished
Preceded by New Office	Chief of the Naval Staff, Indian Navy; April 1955 – July 1955	Succeeded by Sir Stephen Hope Carlill
Preceded by Sir Alexander Madden	Commander-in-Chief, Plymouth; 1955–1958	Succeeded by Sir Richard Onslow
