= Santosh Kumar Gupta =

Rear Admiral Santosh Kumar Gupta MVC, NM
- Born: 21 December 1936; Dehradun, Uttarakhand, India
- Education: The Doon School
- Military career
- Allegiance: India
- Branch: Indian Navy
- Service years: 1958–1990
- Rank: Rear Admiral
- Commands: INS Vikrant
- Conflicts: Bangladesh Liberation War
- Awards: Maha Vir Chakra; Nau Sena Medal

Rear Admiral Santosh Kumar Gupta, MVC, NM is a former flag officer of the Indian Navy. He was awarded the Maha Vir Chakra, the nation's second-highest gallantry award for his command of INAS 300 during the Indo-Pak War of 1971.

== Maha Vir Chakra ==
The citation for the Maha Vir Chakra reads as follows:

Gazette Notification: 18 Pres/72,12-2-72

Operation: – Date of Award: 21 Dec 1971

CITATION

LIEUTENANT COMMANDER SANTOSH KUMAR GUPTA, NM

(00311-F)

Lieutenant Commander Santosh Kumar Gupta, Commanding Officer of a Navy air squadron, operating from the aircraft carrier INS ‘VIKRANT’, led a total of eleven very successful strike missions with devastating effects on enemy ships and heavily defended shore facilities in various sectors of Bangladesh. On 9 December 1971, Lieutenant Commander Gupta pressed home a strike of Seahawk aircraft against enemy targets in Khulna in face of a fierce barrage of anti- aircraft gunfire.

His aircraft was hit and damaged by enemy fire. However, regardless of his personal safety and in the face of extreme danger, Lieutenant Commander Gupta continued to lead the attack with indomitable determination and skill and then led his divisions on board back to safety. Lieutenant Commander Gupta showed great courage and professional ability in landing his damaged aircraft safely on board the carrier.

Throughout the operations, Lieutenant Commander Gupta displayed conspicuous gallantry and outstanding leadership.

== Post-retirement ==
Currently Admiral Gupta resides in Bangalore.

Military offices
Preceded by KASZ Raju	Commanding Officer INS Vikrant; 1982–1984	Succeeded by P. A. Debrass
