= Stephen Carlill =

Royal Navy Vice Admiral (1902–1996)

Vice-Admiral Sir Stephen Carlill KBE CB DSO*

2nd Chief of the Naval Staff
- In office 21 July 1955 – 21 April 1958
- President: Rajendra Prasad
- Prime Minister: Jawaharlal Nehru
- Preceded by: Mark Pizey
- Succeeded by: Ram Dass Katari

Personal details
- Born: 23 December 1902 Orpington, Kent
- Died: 9 February 1996 (aged 93) Colwall, Malvern, Worcestershire
- Awards: KBE; CB; DSO & Bar

Military service
- Allegiance: United Kingdom; India
- Branch/service: Royal Navy; Indian Navy
- Years of service: 1923–1959
- Rank: Vice-Admiral
- Commands: Hambledon; Farndale; Quilliam; Chief of Naval Staff of the Indian Navy
- Battles/wars: World War II

Vice-Admiral Sir Stephen Hope Carlill KBE CB DSO* (23 December 1902 – 9 February 1996) was a Royal Navy admiral who served as the last British Chief of Naval Staff of the Indian Navy from 1955 to 1958, when he was succeeded by Vice-Admiral Ram Dass Katari.

== Early life and career ==
Carlill was born in Orpington, Kent, the son of Harold Flamenk Carlill (1875–1959), a civil servant, and Beatrice Newton Hope (d. 1924). He was educated at the Royal Naval colleges at Osborne and Dartmouth, and was commissioned as an Acting Sub-Lieutenant in 1923. From 1923 to 1926 he served aboard HMS Ramillies and was promoted to Lieutenant in 1925. In 1927 he served aboard the minelayer HMS Adventure. From 1928 to 1930, Carlill studied gunnery at the Royal Naval College, Greenwich and aboard HMS Excellent from 1929 to 1930. He served as 2nd Gunnery Officer on the cruiser HMS Norfolk in the Atlantic Fleet from 1930 to 1931.

From 1932 to 1935, he served as gunnery officer on the cruiser HMS Dunedin and as squadron gunnery officer for the New Zealand Division of the Royal Navy. Carlill was promoted to Lieutenant-Commander in 1933, and returned to Portsmouth from 1935 to 1936 to further study gunnery aboard HMS Excellent. From 1936 to 1937, he served as a gunnery officer on the battlecruiser HMS Hood in the Mediterranean and was promoted to Commander in July 1937. He subsequently served as Squadron Gunnery Officer for the Mediterranean Fleet aboard the cruiser HMS Galatea until August 1939.

During the Second World War, Carlill was successively given command of three ships:

- HMS Hambledon (L37) – as Commander 1 April 1940 to Oct 1940
- HMS Farndale (L70) – as Commander 3 December 1940 to 14 July 1942
- HMS Quilliam (G09) – as Captain 26 August 1942 to Nov 1943

After World War II, Carlill served various ship and land roles:

- Deputy Director (Gunnery), Gunnery and Anti-Aircraft Warfare Division, Admiralty HMS President 1944–46
- Chief of Staff to Commander-in-Chief, British Pacific Fleet HMS Tamar 1946
- Chief Staff Officer to Commander-in-Chief, British Pacific Fleet HMS London 1946–1948
- Commanding Officer, HMS Excellent (gunnery school, Portsmouth) 1949–1950
- Commanding Officer, HMS Illustrious (aircraft carrier) 1950–51
- Senior Naval Member, Imperial Defence College HMS President 1952–1954
- Flag Officer, Training Squadron, Home Fleet HMS Theseus 1954–1955

== Post-naval career ==
Following his service in the Indian Navy, Carlill retired from the Royal Navy on 7 July 1959. He served as representative in Ghana of the West Africa Committee from 1960 to 1966, and as adviser to the West Africa Committee from 1966 to 1967.

== Personal life ==
Carlill was married in 1928 to Julie Fredrike Elisabeth Hildegard (died 1991), only daughter of late Reverend W. Rahlenbeck of Westphalia. The Carlills had two sons; one, Admiral James Michael Rahlenbeck Carlill (1934–2010), also served in the Royal Navy. Carlill died at Colwall, Malvern, Worcestershire in 1996.

Military offices
Preceded by Sir Charles Pizey	Chief of the Naval Staff, Indian Navy; 1955–1958	Succeeded by Ram Dass Katari
