= Chief of the Naval Staff (India) =

Military head of the Indian Navy

- Flag of the Chief of the Naval Staff

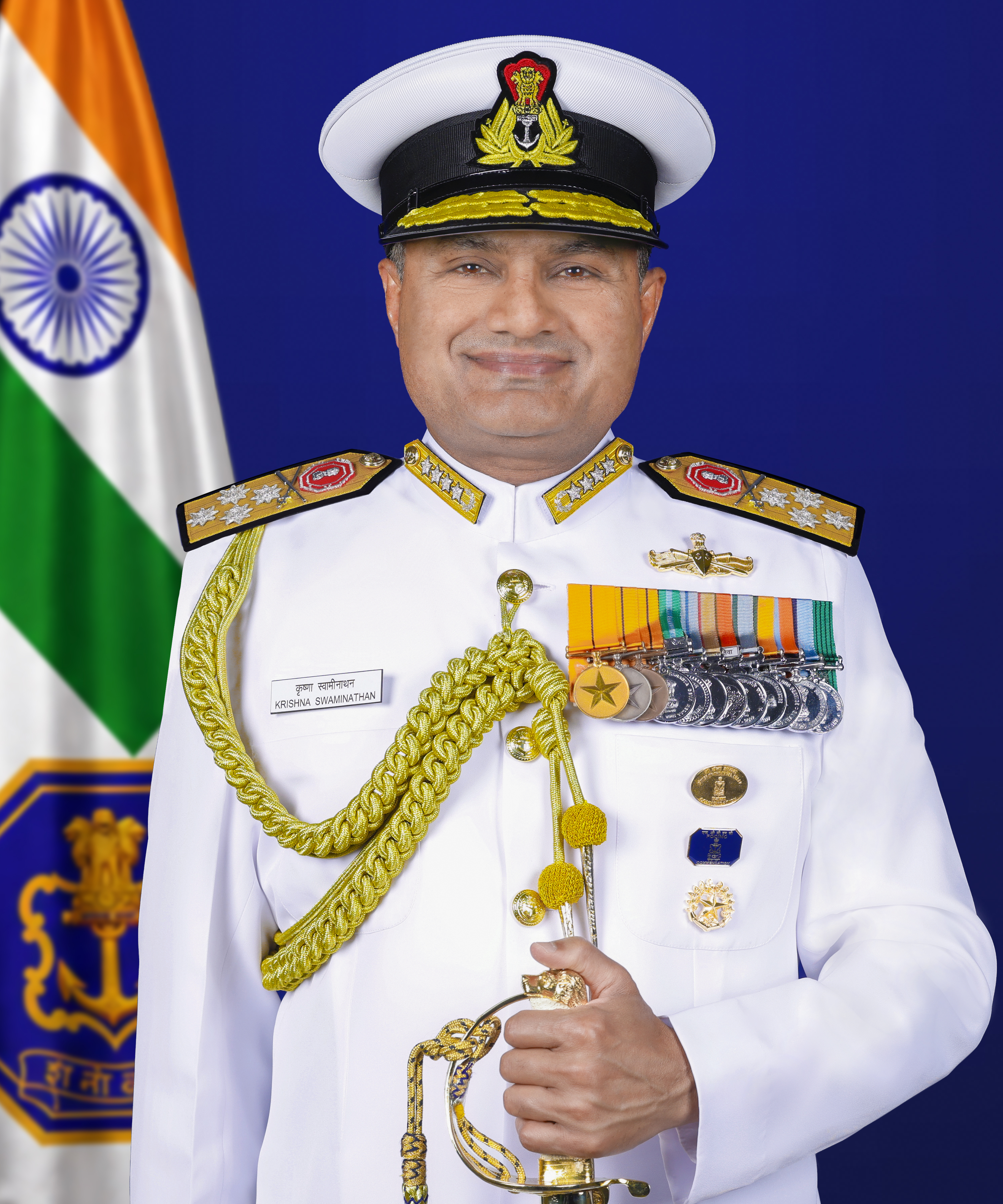
- Incumbent; Admiral Krishna Swaminathan; PVSM AVSM VSM since 31 May 2026
- Indian Navy
- Status: Professional head of naval branch of the Indian Armed Forces.
- Abbreviation: CNS
- Member of: National Security Council; Defence Planning Committee; Defence Acquisition Council
- Reports to: President of India; Prime Minister of India; Minister of Defence; Chief of Defence Staff
- Residence: Navy House, Bungalow Number 12, Rajaji Marg, New Delhi
- Seat: Integrated HQ of MoD (Navy), South Block, Central Secretariat, New Delhi
- Appointer: Appointments Committee of the Cabinet (ACC) President of India
- Term length: 3 years or at the age of 62, whichever is earlier.
- Constituting instrument: Navy Act, 1957 (Act No. 62 of 1957)
- Precursor: Chief of the Naval Staff and Commander-in-Chief, Indian Navy
- Formation: 26 January 1950; 76 years ago
- First holder: Vice-Admiral Edward Parry
- Deputy: Vice Chief of the Naval Staff
- Salary: ₹250,000 (US$2,600) monthly

The chief of the naval staff (CNS) is the professional head of the Indian Navy since 1955. The CNS is a permanent member of the Chiefs of Staff Committee, National Security Council and Defence Planning Committee and serves as a senior advisor to the minister of defence, prime minister and the president, who is the supreme commander of the Defence Forces. The position is customarily held by a four-star admiral and is usually the highest-ranking naval officer on active duty unless the chief of defence staff is a naval officer. Prior to 1955, the position was known as the commander in chief, Indian Navy.

Being a permanent member of the Chiefs of Staff Committee (COSC) and the National Security Council (NSC), the CNS also bears the responsibility of advising the nation's civilian leadership i.e., the Government of India on all matters privy to the IN.

Statutorily, the CNS ranks 12th overall in the Indian order of precedence, and is the IN's status-equivalent of the chief of defence staff, the chief of the army staff and the chief of the air staff –all three positions of which are also occupied by four-star officers from the armed forces.

== Description ==
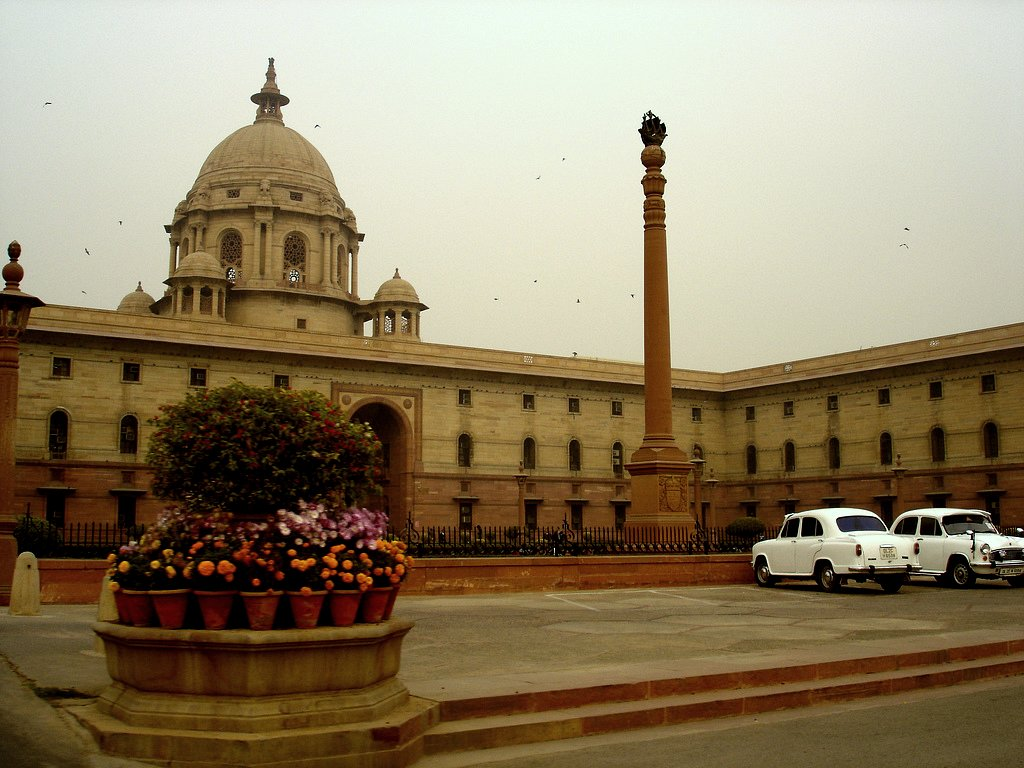
The South Block, Central Secretariat, New Delhi - the station of the IHQ of MoD (Navy), where the CNS is seated.

=== Roles and responsibilities ===
Seated at Integrated Headquarters of Ministry of Defence (Navy) stationed in New Delhi. The CNS is the senior-most operational officer of the Indian Navy and is tasked with the following:

- Advising the Government of India on all matters privy to the Indian Navy.
- Commitment to enhancing the force's capabilities towards sustaining combat readiness and operational effectiveness during periods of peace and conflict.
- Coordinating various components of the IN towards the protection-cum-realization of the nation's maritime sovereignty during states of armed conflict or war.
- Providing direction towards the overall functioning of the organization's facets, such as command, control, administration and strategy.
- Convening courts-martial at the behest of the Central Government to review cases of misconduct during peace and wartime.
- Reviewing the judicial sentencing and pleas of officers convicted of professional misconduct whilst in service.

In addition to these responsibilities, the CAS is also a permanent member of:

- Chiefs of Staff Committee (COSC)
- National Security Council (NSC)
- Defence Planning Committee (DPC)
- Defence Acquisition Council (DAC)

The office's eminence in the aforementioned groups thus grants the appointee with the role to advise the Minister of Defence (Raksha Mantri or RM) on the affairs related to the IN's functioning and the promotion of an comprehensive integrated planning policy with respect to the affairs of tri-service integration, doctrinal strategy, capability development, defence acquisition and infrastructure.

=== Structure ===
As the professional head of the force, the CNS is assisted by one subordinate officer and three principal staff officers, namely:

- Subordinate:
  - Vice Chief of the Naval Staff (VCNS)
- Principal Staff Officers:
  - Deputy Chief of the Naval Staff (DCNS)
  - Chief of Materiel (COM)
  - Chief of Personnel (COP)

=== Promotion ===
Initially, beginning in the pre-independence era, until 1968, the office of CNS was held by a three-star vice admiral. However, the office's rank-specifications was raised to the four-star rank of admiral when then-CNS Vice Admiral Adhar Kumar Chatterji was promoted in March 1968; every CNS-appointee since then has been an admiral.

The move to appoint a new designate to the position usually begins several months before the change-of-command, wherein the Ministry of Defence (MoD) reviews the résumés of the IN's senior-most vice admirals, which regularly includes the Vice Chief of the Naval Staff (VCNS), the Flag Officer Commanding-in-Chiefs (FOC-in-C) of the force's three combatant commands and the Commander-in-Chiefs (C-in-C) of India's two integrated military commands.

Appointments to the position are made by the Appointments Committee of the Cabinet (ACC) - comprising the Prime Minister and the Minister of Defence, upon recommendation from IHQ of MoD (Navy), whereupon the designated appointee is subsequently promoted to the rank of admiral.

=== Tenure ===
According to Part III of the IN's Regulations for the Navy, 1991 - a CNS-appointee reaches superannuation upon the completion of three years in the position or at the age of 62, whichever is earlier. However, an appointee may also be dismissed from office by the President of India before the conclusion of the tenure under the Section 15(1) of the Navy Act, 1957 and Article 310 of the Constitution. This provision was used by then-President K. R. Narayanan to dismiss then-CNS Admiral Vishnu Bhagwat from service in December 1998.

Between 1950 and 1990, the senior-most vice admirals in the IN's command cadre have customarily been appointed as CNS, even under the event of an abrupt stoppage during the incumbent's tenure - by termination or resignation; however, this tradition has since been broken thrice: first in 1990, when then CNS-designate Vice Admiral Laxminarayan Ramdas superseded one senior officer, and again in 2014 and 2016, when then-Vice Admirals Robin K. Dhowan and Karambir Singh were appointed to the office superseding one senior officer, respectively.

Additionally, a CNS-appointee is also eligible to be selected for the position of Chief of Defence Staff (CDS), in accordance with the Naval Ceremonial, Conditions of Service and Miscellaneous (Amendment) Regulations, 2022 - which prescribes that the designated nominee, in this case the CNS, must be under the age of 62 at the time of appointment as CDS; as of 2024, no CNS-appointee has ever been appointed as CDS. Although the office of CDS was originally created in 2019, the MoD had originally planned for it to be created in 2001 with then-CNS Admiral Sushil Kumar as its first appointee; however, the plan failed to materialize over interservice rivalry and Kumar never became the CDS.

== History ==
=== Dominion-era (1947-1950) ===
Following independence and the subsequent partition of the subcontinent, the RIN was bifurcated into two new entities: the successor Royal Indian Navy (RIN) - responsible for the Dominion of India, and the newly-formed Royal Pakistan Navy (RPN) - responsible for the Dominion of Pakistan. At the time, the RIN's commanding officer was designated the Commander-in-Chief, Royal Indian Navy." On 21 June 1948, the title of "Chief of the Naval Staff" was added, On 21 June 1948, the officer was re-designated as Chief of the Naval Staff and Commander-in-Chief, Royal Indian Navy (CNS/C-in-C, RIN) - as a measure to reflect uniformity with the C-in-Cs of the post-independence Indian Army and the Royal Indian Air Force.

Upon India's establishment as a republic on 26 January 1950, the RIN was rechristened as the Indian Navy (IN), dropping the Royal-prefix; subsequently, the position's designation was again modified to Chief of the Naval Staff and Commander-in-Chief, Indian Navy (CNS/C-in-C, IN).

=== Republic-era (1950-present) ===
In 1955, the designation of the office was shortened to simply to Chief of the Naval Staff (CNS) through the Commanders-In-Chief (Change in Designation) Act, 1955; as a result of the Act, the tenure of the then-serving C-in-C - Admiral Sir Charles Thomas Mark Pizey, continued under the new designation. Between 1950 and 1958, the office was officiated by flag officers seconded from the RN, which ceased with the appointment of Vice Admiral Ram Dass Katari in April 1958 - which thus made him the first Indian officer to be promoted to the rank, and subsequently, the first Indian-origin chief of the IN. Ten years later, in March 1968, the rank-specifications for the office was raised to the rank of admiral, with the promotion of then-CNS Vice Admiral Adhar Kumar Chatterji.

In December 1998, Admiral Vishnu Bhagwat, the then-incumbent CNS and Chairman of the Chiefs of Staff Committee (Chairman COSC), was abruptly dismissed from office, which made him the only CNS-appointee - and the only-ever military chief in the Indian Armed Forces to be relieved from service to date.

== Appointees ==
No.	Portrait	Name	Took office	Left office	Time in office	Ref.
1	John Talbot Savignac Hall CIE	Rear Admiral; John Talbot Savignac Hall CIE (1896–1964)	15 August 1947	20 June 1948	310 days	

=== Chief of the Naval Staff and Commander-in-Chief, Royal Indian Navy (1948–1950) ===
No.	Portrait	Name	Took office	Left office	Time in office	Ref.
1	John Talbot Savignac Hall CIE	Rear Admiral; John Talbot Savignac Hall CIE (1896–1964)	21 June 1948	14 August 1948	54 days	
2	Sir William Edward Parry KCB	Vice Admiral; Sir William Edward Parry KCB (1893–1972)	14 August 1948	25 January 1950	1 year, 164 days	.

=== Chief of the Naval Staff and Commander-in-Chief, Indian Navy (1950–1955) ===
No.	Portrait	Name	Took office	Left office	Time in office
2	Sir William Edward Parry KCB	Vice-Admiral; Sir William Edward Parry KCB (1893–1972)	26 January 1950	13 October 1951	1 year, 260 days
3	Sir Charles Thomas Mark Pizey KBE, CB, DSO & Bar	Admiral; Sir Charles Thomas Mark Pizey KBE, CB, DSO & Bar (1899–1993)	13 October 1951	31 March 1955	3 years, 169 days

=== Chief of the Naval Staff (1955–present) ===
No.	Portrait	Name	Took office	Left office	Time in office
1	Sir Charles Thomas Mark Pizey KBE, CB, DSO & Bar	Admiral; Sir Charles Thomas Mark Pizey KBE, CB, DSO & Bar (1899–1993)	1 April 1955	21 July 1955	111 days
2	Sir Stephen Hope Carlill KBE, CB, DSO & Bar	Vice-Admiral; Sir Stephen Hope Carlill KBE, CB, DSO & Bar (1902–1996)	21 July 1955	21 April 1958	2 years, 274 days
3	Ram Dass Katari	Vice-Admiral; Ram Dass Katari (1911–1983)	22 April 1958	4 June 1962	4 years, 43 days
4	Bhaskar Sadashiv Soman	Vice-Admiral; Bhaskar Sadashiv Soman (1913–1995)	4 June 1962	3 March 1966	3 years, 272 days
5	Adhar Kumar Chatterji	Admiral; Adhar Kumar Chatterji (1914–2001)	3 March 1966	28 February 1970	3 years, 362 days
6	Sardarilal Mathradas Nanda PVSM, AVSM	Admiral; Sardarilal Mathradas Nanda PVSM, AVSM (1915–2009)	28 February 1970	28 February 1973	3 years
7	Sourendra Nath Kohli PVSM	Admiral; Sourendra Nath Kohli PVSM (1916–1997)	1 March 1973	29 February 1976	2 years, 365 days
8	Jal Cursetji PVSM	Admiral; Jal Cursetji PVSM (1919–1991)	1 March 1976	1 March 1979	3 years
9	Ronald Lynsdale Pereira PVSM, AVSM	Admiral; Ronald Lynsdale Pereira PVSM, AVSM (1923–1993)	1 March 1979	28 February 1982	2 years, 364 days
10	Oscar Stanley Dawson PVSM, AVSM, ADC	Admiral; Oscar Stanley Dawson PVSM, AVSM, ADC (1923–2011)	1 March 1982	30 November 1984	2 years, 274 days
11	Radhakrishna Hariram Tahiliani PVSM, AVSM	Admiral; Radhakrishna Hariram Tahiliani PVSM, AVSM (1930–2015)	1 December 1984	30 November 1987	2 years, 364 days
12	Jayant Ganpat Nadkarni PVSM, AVSM, NM, VSM, ADC	Admiral; Jayant Ganpat Nadkarni PVSM, AVSM, NM, VSM, ADC (1931–2018)	1 December 1987	30 November 1990	2 years, 364 days
13	Laxminarayan Ramdas PVSM, AVSM, VrC, VSM, ADC	Admiral; Laxminarayan Ramdas PVSM, AVSM, VrC, VSM, ADC (1933–2024)	1 December 1990	30 September 1993	2 years, 303 days
14	Vijai Singh Shekhawat PVSM, AVSM, VrC, ADC	Admiral; Vijai Singh Shekhawat PVSM, AVSM, VrC, ADC (born 1936)	1 October 1993	30 September 1996	2 years, 365 days
15	Vishnu Bhagwat PVSM, AVSM, ADC	Admiral; Vishnu Bhagwat PVSM, AVSM, ADC (born 1939)	1 October 1996	30 December 1998	2 years, 90 days
16	Sushil Kumar PVSM, UYSM, AVSM, NM, ADC	Admiral; Sushil Kumar PVSM, UYSM, AVSM, NM, ADC (1940–2019)	30 December 1998	29 December 2001	2 years, 364 days
17	Madhvendra Singh PVSM, AVSM, ADC	Admiral; Madhvendra Singh PVSM, AVSM, ADC (born 1942)	29 December 2001	31 July 2004	2 years, 215 days
18	Arun Prakash PVSM, AVSM, VrC, VSM, ADC	Admiral; Arun Prakash PVSM, AVSM, VrC, VSM, ADC (born 1944)	31 July 2004	31 October 2006	2 years, 215 days
19	Sureesh Mehta PVSM, AVSM, ADC	Admiral; Sureesh Mehta PVSM, AVSM, ADC (born 1947)	31 October 2006	31 August 2009	2 years, 304 days
20	Nirmal Kumar Verma PVSM, AVSM	Admiral; Nirmal Kumar Verma PVSM, AVSM (born 1950)	31 August 2009	31 August 2012	3 years
21	Devendra Kumar Joshi PVSM, AVSM, YSM, NM, VSM, ADC	Admiral; Devendra Kumar Joshi PVSM, AVSM, YSM, NM, VSM, ADC (born 1954)	31 August 2012	26 February 2014	1 year, 179 days
–	Robin K. Dhowan PVSM, AVSM, YSM, ADC	Vice Admiral; Robin K. Dhowan PVSM, AVSM, YSM, ADC (born 1954); Acting	26 February 2014	17 April 2014	50 days
22	Robin K. Dhowan PVSM, AVSM, YSM, ADC	Admiral; Robin K. Dhowan PVSM, AVSM, YSM, ADC (born 1954)	17 April 2014	31 May 2016	2 years, 44 days
23	Sunil Lanba PVSM, AVSM, ADC	Admiral; Sunil Lanba PVSM, AVSM, ADC (born 1957)	31 May 2016	31 May 2019	3 years
24	Karambir Singh PVSM, AVSM, ADC	Admiral; Karambir Singh PVSM, AVSM, ADC (born 1959)	31 May 2019	30 November 2021	2 years, 183 days
25	R. Hari Kumar PVSM, AVSM, VSM, ADC	Admiral; R. Hari Kumar PVSM, AVSM, VSM, ADC (born 1962)	30 November 2021	30 April 2024	2 years, 152 days
26	Dinesh Kumar Tripathi PVSM, AVSM, NM	Admiral; Dinesh Kumar Tripathi PVSM, AVSM, NM (born 1964)	30 April 2024	31 May 2026	2 years, 31 days
27	Krishna Swaminathan PVSM, AVSM, VSM	Admiral; Krishna Swaminathan PVSM, AVSM, VSM (born 1966)	31 May 2026	Incumbent	155 days

== See also ==
=== Other offices of the Indian Armed Forces ===
- Chief of Defence Staff
- Chairman of the Chiefs of Staff Committee
- Chief of Integrated Defence Staff
- Chief of the Army Staff
- Chief of the Air Staff

=== History ===
- Royal Indian Navy Commanders
- List of serving admirals of the Indian Navy
