= INS Kalvari (S23) =

Name ship of the Kalvari-class of submarines of the Indian Navy

History

India
- Name: INS Kalvari
- Namesake: "Kalvari" a deep sea tiger shark.
- Launched: 15 April 1967
- Commissioned: 8 December 1967
- Decommissioned: 31 May 1996
- Identification: S23
- Fate: Decommissioned
- Status: Hull scrapped, fin preserved

General characteristics
- Class & type: Kalvari-class submarine
- Displacement: 1,950 t (1,919 long tons) surfaced; 2,475 t (2,436 long tons) submerged
- Length: 91.3 m (299 ft 6 in)
- Beam: 7.5 m (24 ft 7 in)
- Draught: 6 m (19 ft 8 in)
- Speed: 16 knots (30 km/h; 18 mph) surfaced; 15 knots (28 km/h; 17 mph) submerged
- Range: 20,000 mi (32,000 km) at 8 kn (15 km/h; 9.2 mph) surfaced; 380 mi (610 km) at 10 kn (19 km/h; 12 mph) submerged
- Test depth: 250 m (820 ft)
- Complement: 75 (incl 8 officers)
- Armament: 10 533 mm (21 in) torpedo tubes with 22 SET-65E/SAET-60 torpedoes; 44 mines in lieu of torpedoes

INS Kalvari (S23) was the lead vessel of the Kalvari class of diesel-electric submarines of the Indian Navy. It was the first ever submarine inducted into service by the Indian Navy. The submarine was laid down on 27 December 1966 as Foxtrot-class submarine B-51 of the Soviet Navy by Novo-Admiralty at Galerniy Island, Leningrad.

== Overview ==
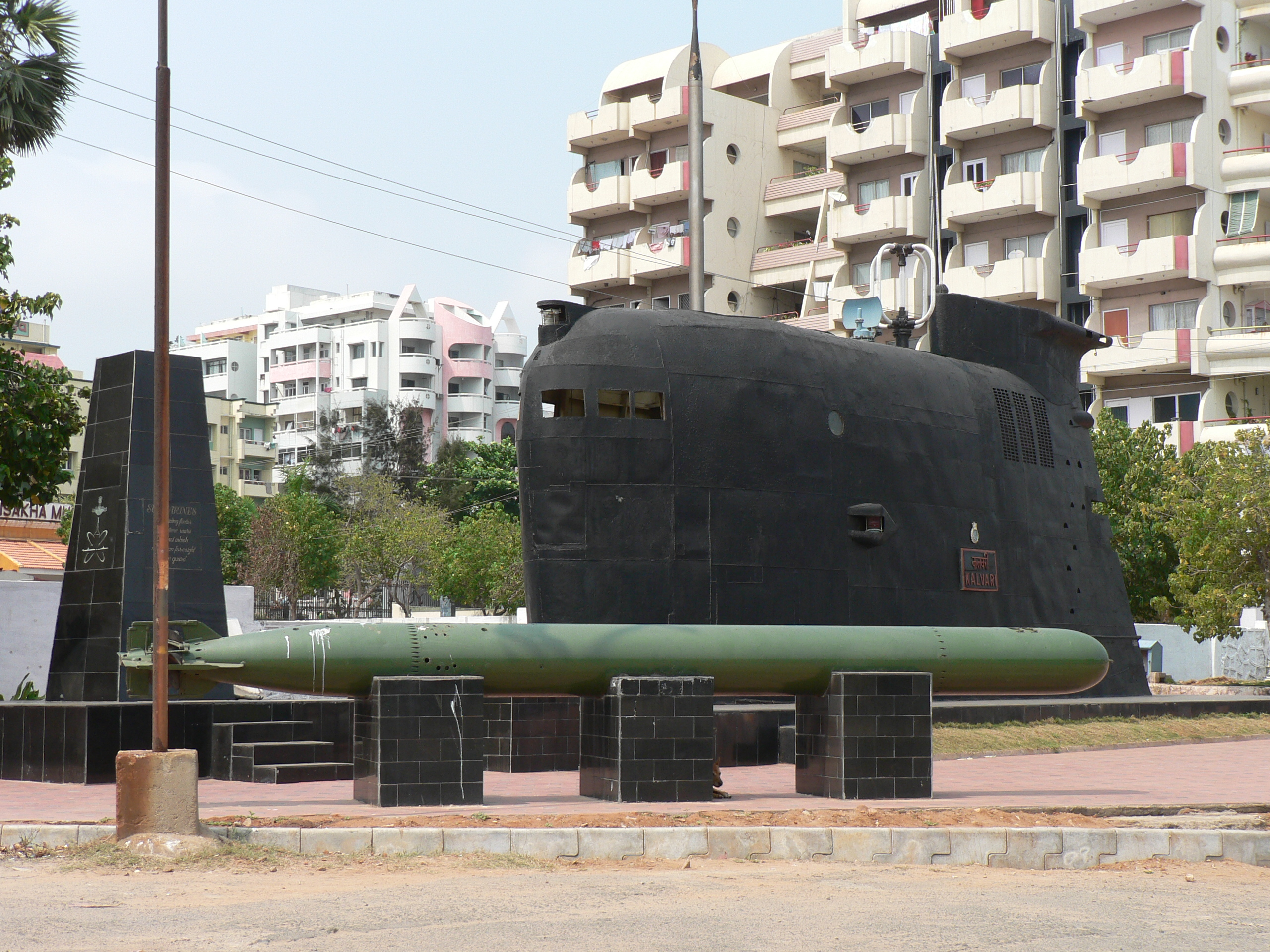
INS Kalvari submarine fin at RK Beach

The submarine was launched on 15 April 1967 and competed on 26 September 1967. The submarine was commissioned by the Indian Navy on 8 December 1967 at Riga, Soviet Union. The Navy celebrates Submarine Day annually on 8 December to commemorate this occasion. When the submarine arrived in Bombay, the service docks were not yet ready to accommodate the submarine. When the 1971 Indo-Pakistan war broke out, Kalvari was under refit and did not partake in operations.

The submarine was decommissioned in 1992.

Kalvari is the Malayalam word for tiger shark, a deep-sea predator in the Indian Ocean. The name symbolizes agility, strength and predatory power. The tiger shark (Galeocerdo Cuvier) is a species of requiem shark which are found in tropical and temperate waters.
