= INS Kursura =

Indian Kalvari-class submarine

Coordinates: 17°43′03″N 83°19′46″E

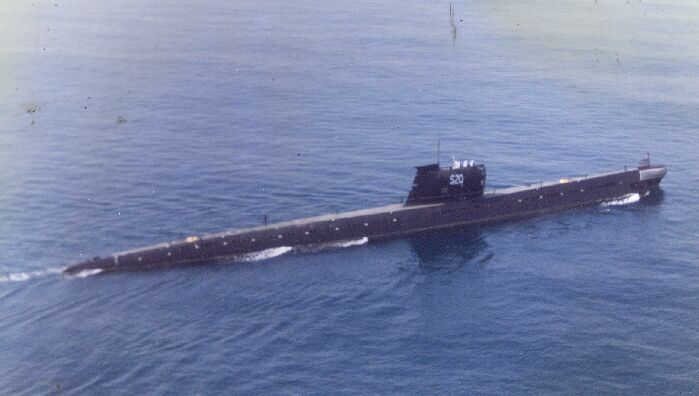
- INS Kursura underway

History

India
- Name: INS Kursura
- Builder: Sudomekh, Admiralty Shipyard, Leningrad, Soviet Union
- Launched: 25 February 1969
- Commissioned: 18 December 1969
- Decommissioned: 27 February 2001
- Identification: S20
- Fate: Museum ship at RK Beach, Visakhapatnam

General characteristics
- Class & type: Kalvari-class submarine
- Displacement: 1,950 t (1,919 long tons) surfaced; 2,475 t (2,436 long tons) submerged
- Length: 91.3 m (300 ft)
- Beam: 7.5 m (25 ft)
- Draught: 6 m (20 ft)
- Speed: 16 knots (30 km/h; 18 mph) surfaced; 15 knots (28 km/h; 17 mph) submerged
- Range: 20,000 mi (32,000 km) at 8 kn (15 km/h; 9.2 mph) surfaced; 380 mi (610 km) at 10 kn (19 km/h; 12 mph) submerged
- Test depth: 985 ft (300 m)
- Complement: 75 (incl 8 officers)
- Armament: 10 × 533 mm (21 in) torpedo tubes with 22 Type 53 torpedoes; 44 mines in lieu of torpedoes

INS Kursura (S20) was a Kalvari-class (variant of the Foxtrot-class) diesel-electric submarine of the Indian Navy. It was India's fourth submarine. Kursura was commissioned on 18 December 1969 and was decommissioned on 27 February 2001 after 31 years of service. It participated in the Indo-Pakistani War of 1971, where it played a key role in patrol missions. It later participated in naval exercises with other nations and made many goodwill visits to other countries.

After decommissioning, It was dedicated to the Nation by the Chief minister N. Chandrababu Naidu on 9 August 2002 and was preserved as a museum for public access from 24 August 2002 making its final journey to Visakhapatnam on RK Beach. Kursura has the distinction of being one of the very few submarine museums to retain originality and has been called a "must-visit destination" of Visakhapatnam. Despite being a decommissioned submarine, she still receives the navy's "Dressing Ship" honour, which is usually awarded only to active ships.

== Description ==
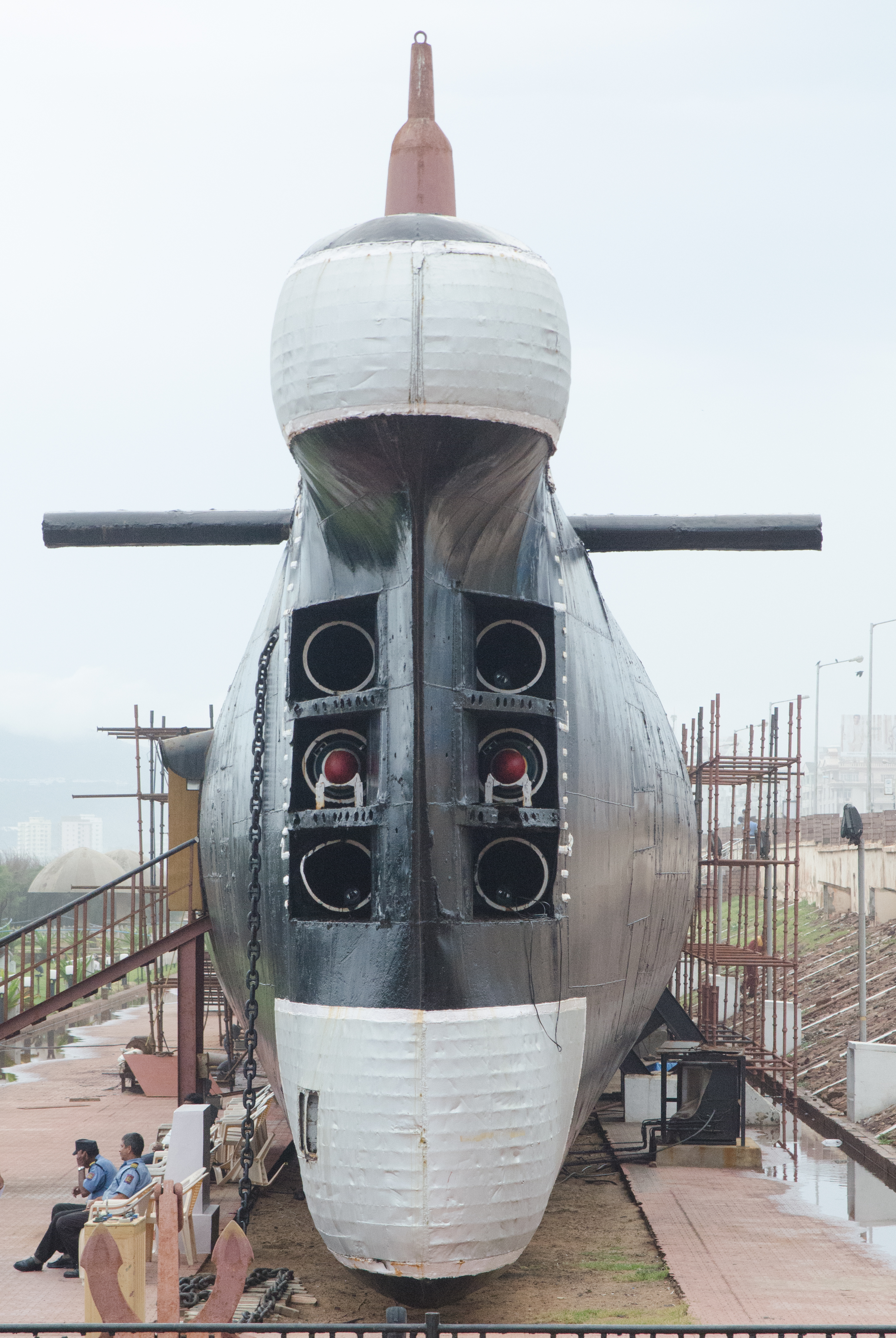
The six torpedo tubes of Kursura. Two are loaded with torpedoes.

Kursura has a length of 91.3 m (300 ft) overall, a beam of 7.5 m (25 ft) and a draught of 6 m (20 ft). She displaces 1,950 t (1,919 long tons) surfaced, 2,475 t (2,436 long tons) submerged and has a maximum diving depth of 985 ft (300 m). The complement is about 75, including 8 officers and 67 sailors.

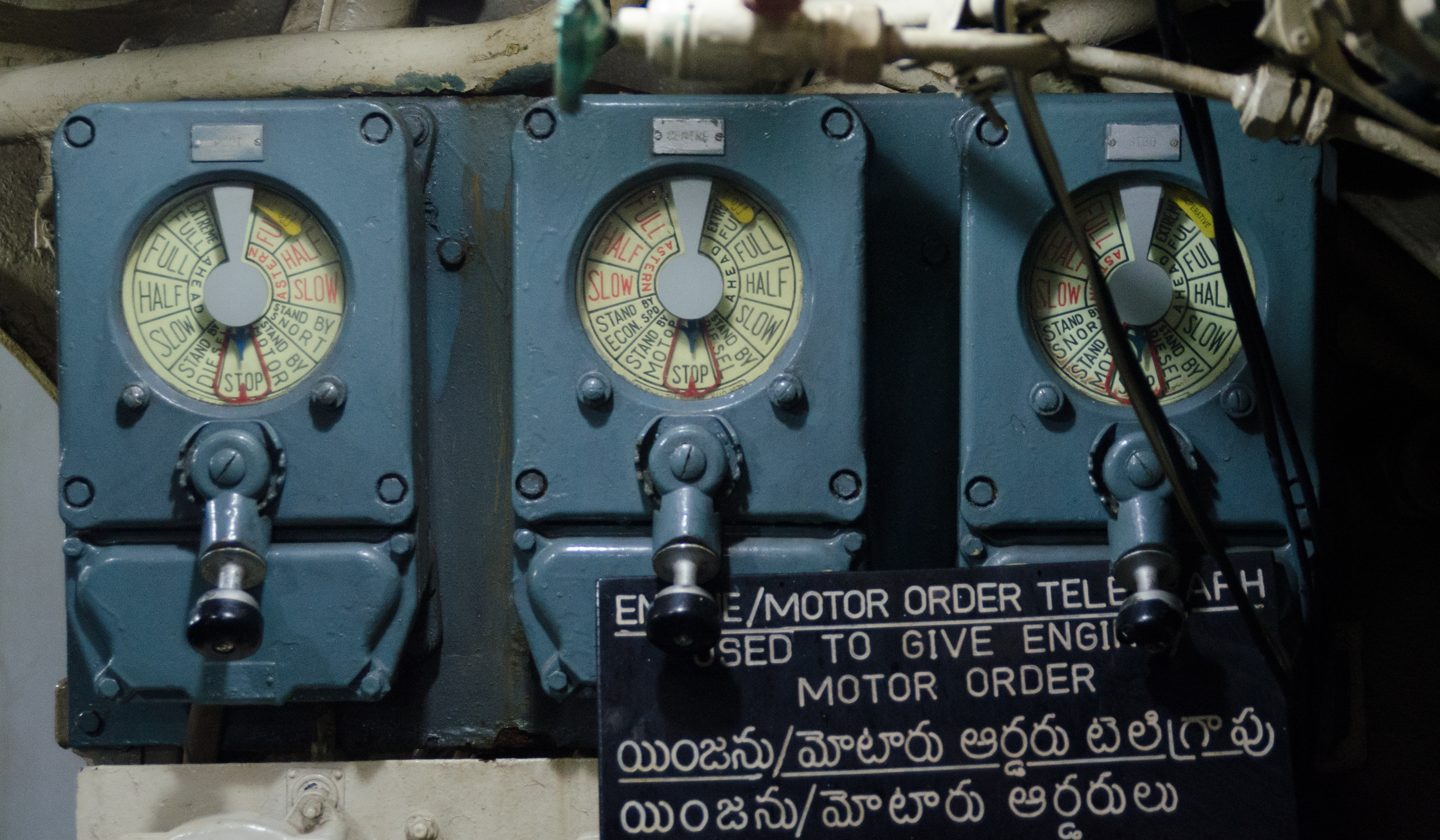
Telegraph dials aboard the submarine

The submarine has three shafts, each with a six-blade propeller. She is powered by three Kolomna 2D42M diesel engines, each with 2,000 horsepower (1,500 kW). She also has three electric motors, two of them with 1,350 hp (1,010 kW) and one with 2,700 hp (2,000 kW). She can achieve a maximum speed of 16 knots (30 km/h) when on surface, 15 knots (28 km/h) when submerged and 9 knots (17 km/h) while snorkelling. She has a range of 20,000 mi (32,000 km) at 8 kn (15 km/h; 9.2 mph) when surfaced and 380 mi (610 km) at 10 kn (19 km/h; 12 mph) when submerged. There are 10 torpedo tubes to carry 22 Type 53 torpedoes. She could lay 44 mines instead of torpedoes. She also had a snoop tray and I-Band radar for surface search.

== Operational history ==
Kursura was commissioned on 18 December 1969 at Riga, Soviet Union. She was India's fourth submarine. Kursura's first commanding officer was Commander Arun Auditto. He began her maiden voyage to India on 20 February 1970. During her homecoming voyage, which lasted from February to April 1970, she visited Gothenburg, La Coruña, Takoradi and Mauritius. Kursura, along with sister boat INS Karanj, were made operational under the Indian Navy's Western Naval Command, and reported to the Flag officer Commanding-in-Chief Western Naval Command (FOCINCWEST). They were ordered to patrol approaches to Pakistan's Karachi harbour and Makran Coast, for which they established waiting stations and submarine havens.

In 1970, Karanj was badly damaged after a collision with the destroyer Ranjit when she surfaced directly below the ship. As no drawings of the damaged portions of the boat were available with the Bombay Dockyard or the Indian Navy, it was decided to use Kursura, which was already docked at Bombay, as the design template for the metal work, and Karanj was repaired within months, in time to join the Indo-Pakistani War of 1971.

=== Indo-Pakistan War of 1971 ===
During the Indo-Pakistani War of 1971, Kursura operated in the Arabian Sea. She was given the patrol duties at two designated areas before the war started, but was ordered to operate under two restrictions: she was not to cross demarcated shipping corridors and she could attack a target only after positive identification. The aims of her patrol were to sink any Pakistani naval warships, to sink merchant shipping when specifically ordered, and to conduct general patrol and surveillance.

She started from her home port on 13 November 1971 and reached her patrol location by 18 November. She remained there until 25 November when she was shifted to a new patrol location and remained there until 30 November. On 30 November, she rendezvoused with Karanj at sea to transfer instructions and subsequently then left for Bombay and reached there by 4 December 1971. During her patrols, she encountered fair weather and monitored a number of tankers and commercial aircraft flying on international routes. She was originally intended to lay mines but the plan was later cancelled.

=== Later service ===
Kursura was used for test firing the NSTL 58 torpedo in 1975. She was laid off for many years to be cannibalised for spare parts for other submarines, but underwent a refit in the Soviet Union between September 1980 and April 1982, and was made operational again in 1985.

Along with INS Taragiri, she participated in the first anti-submarine warfare(ASW) training exercise with the RSS Victory of Singapore off the coast of Port Blair between 21 and 24 February 1994. She participated in the second ASW exercise with Singapore along with INS Dunagiri, RSS Valour and RSS Vigilance. She visited Singapore and Jakarta, Indonesia, in December 1994 on a good-will visit.

After a service of 31 years and traversing 73,500 nautical miles (136,100 km; 84,600 mi), she was decommissioned on 27 February 2001. Despite being a decommissioned submarine, she still receives the navy's "Dressing Ship" honour, which is usually only awarded to active ships.

== Museum ship (2002 – present) ==
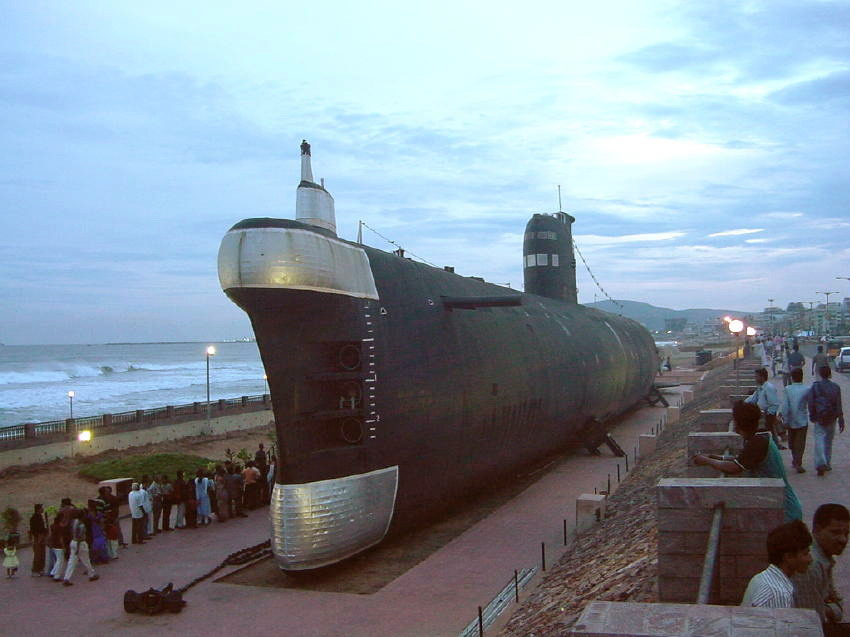
Kursura as a museum ship in Visakhapatnam

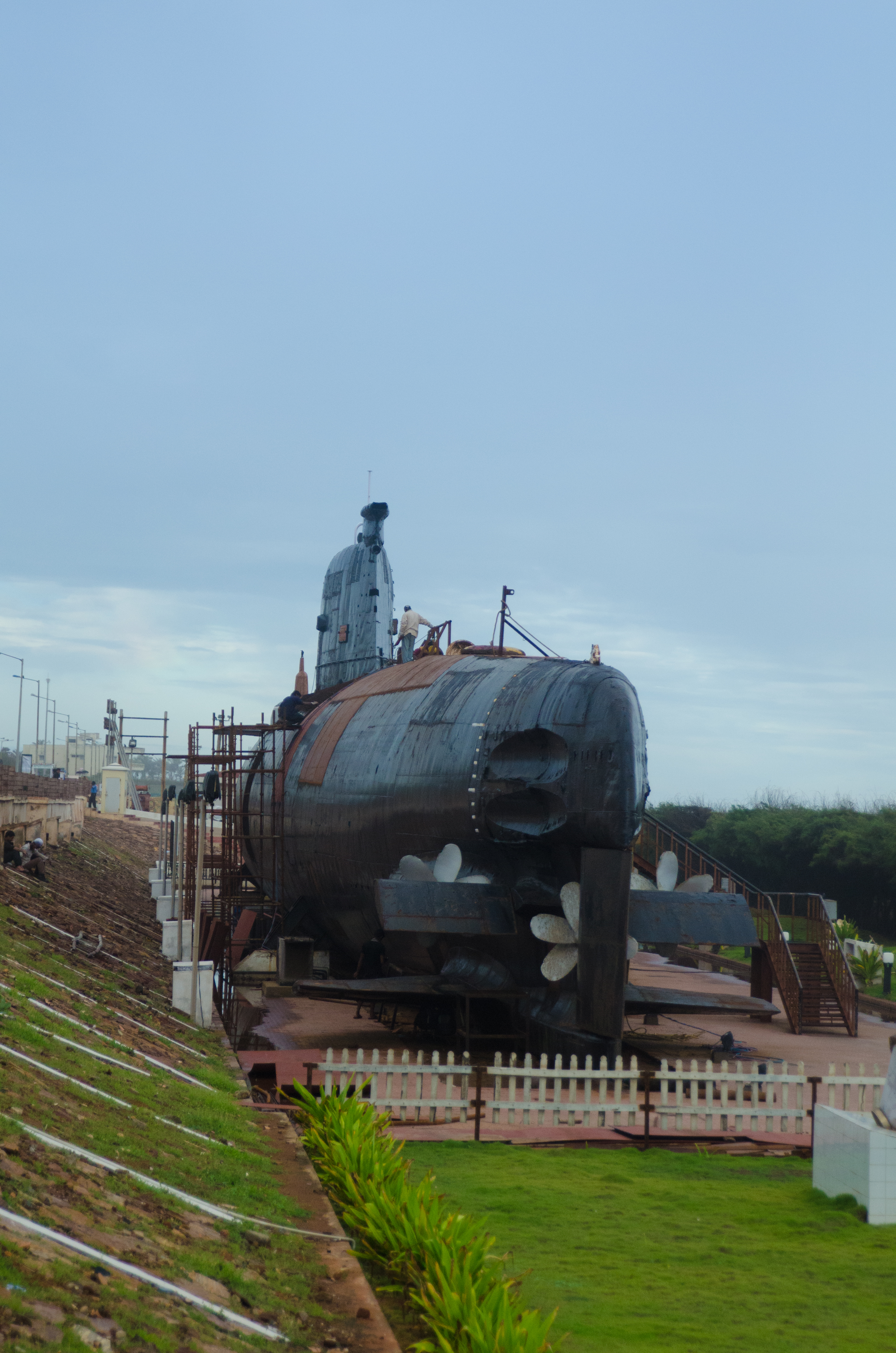
Kursura undergoing repairs in 2013

After decommissioning, the ship was towed to RK Beach in Visakhapatnam and was established as a museum ship, which is the first submarine museum in South Asia. The idea of the boat's conversion to a museum is credited to Admiral V Pasricha. Towing the submarine 600 metres to its final location took 18 months and cost ₹ 55 million. It was converted as a museum by N. Chandrababu Naidu government launching from 9 August 2002, and it was open to the public from 24 August 2002. Six retired naval personnel serve as guides and another one as the curator.

Kursura has the distinction of being one of the very few submarine museums to retain originality. She has become a famous tourist attraction of the city and has been called a "must-visit destination" of Visakhapatnam by The Hindu. Out of the ₹ 10 million revenue generated every year by the museum, ₹ 8 million is used for the submarine's maintenance. During the first four months of the museum's operation, it was visited by about 93,000 people. Daily visitors usually range between 500 and 600 and shoot up to 1,500 during the tourist season.

In September 2007, Vice Admiral Carol M. Pottenger of the United States Navy visited the submarine when she wrote in the guestbook "What a fantastic experience. The Indian Navy should be very proud of this awesome display". She said that the submarine was very well preserved and they did not have anything similar to it in the United States. A major overhaul was done in December 2007 to repair her hull's corrosion. New steel plates were arranged at a cost of ₹ 1.5 million. As of August 2008, about 1.5 million people had visited the museum, and in 2010, she was visited by 270,000 people.

== Gallery ==
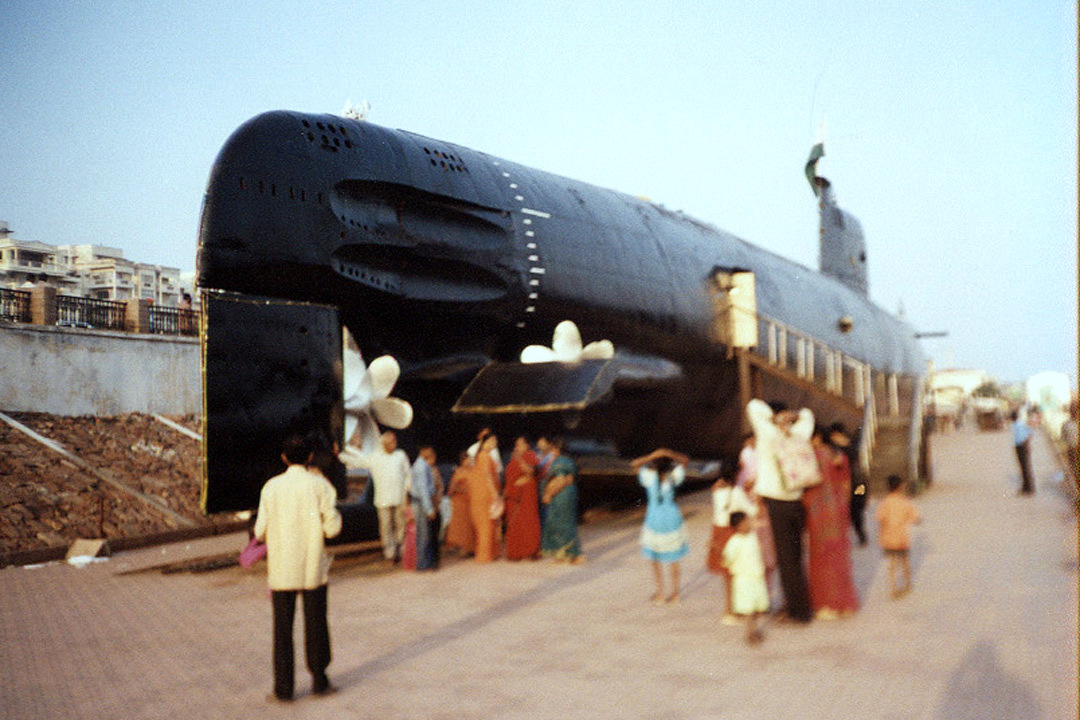
Stern view of the submarine

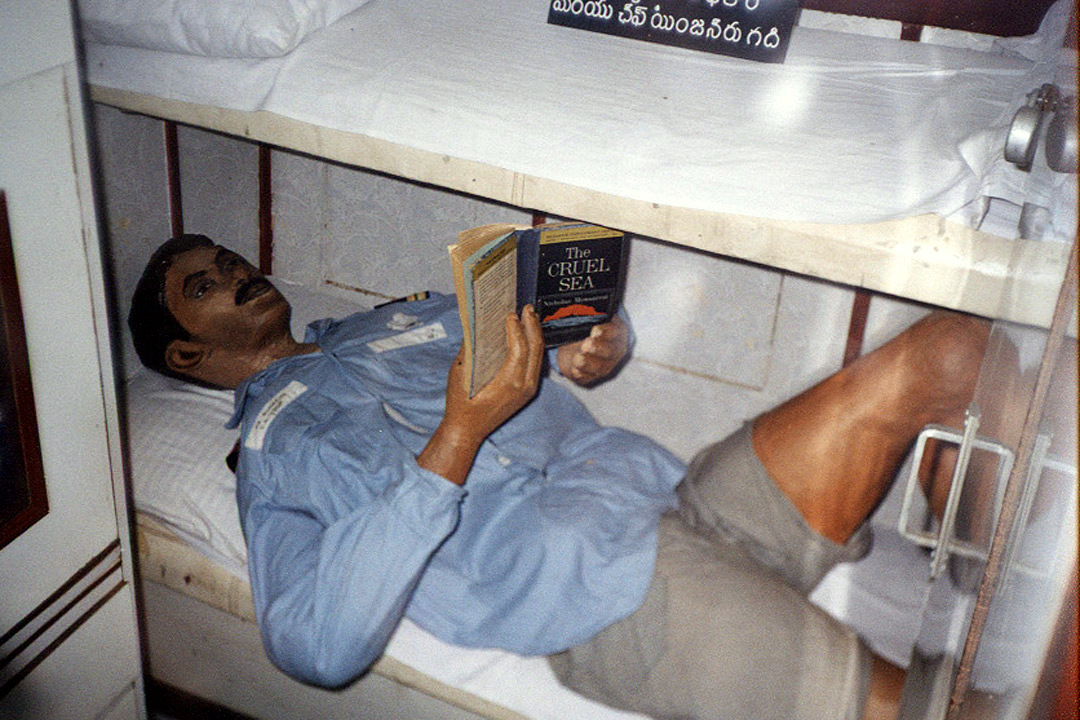
An officer's cabin
