= INS Khanderi (1968) =

Submarine of the Indian Navy

History

India
- Name: INS Khanderi
- Namesake: Khanderi
- Commissioned: 6 December 1968
- Decommissioned: 18 October 1989
- Fate: Decommissioned

General characteristics
- Class & type: Kalvari-class submarine
- Displacement: 1,950 t (1,919 long tons) surfaced; 2,475 t (2,436 long tons) submerged
- Length: 91.3 m (299 ft 6 in)
- Beam: 7.5 m (24 ft 7 in)
- Draught: 6 m (19 ft 8 in)
- Speed: 16 knots (30 km/h; 18 mph) surfaced; 15 knots (28 km/h; 17 mph) submerged
- Range: 20,000 mi (32,000 km) at 8 kn (15 km/h; 9.2 mph) surfaced; 380 mi (610 km) at 10 kn (19 km/h; 12 mph) submerged
- Test depth: 250 m (820 ft)
- Complement: 75 (incl 8 officers)
- Armament: 10 533 mm (21 in) torpedo tubes with 22 SET-65E/SAET-60 torpedoes; 44 mines in lieu of torpedoes

INS Khanderi (S22) was a Kalvari-class diesel-electric submarine of the Indian Navy.

== History ==
Khanderi was built at Sudomekh, Admiralty Shipyard and commissioned in the navy in December 1968 and decommissioned from service in 1989. The hull was scrapped, but her fin was preserved at Virbahu parade grounds.

The submarine was named after Maratha emperor Shivaji's island fort of Khanderi.

On 22 April 1969, INS Khanderi became the first submarine in the world to reach the highest port, Matadi, Democratic Republic of the Congo after successfully navigated 80 nm up the Congo River. This was a part of the first voyage. Previous attempts to reach the port by the US Navy and the Royal Navy had reportedly failed.

Khanderi was deployed in a long-range escort role for the carrier battle group centered on INS Vikrant during the 1971 Indo-Pakistan war. By the end of the war, Khanderi had worn out her battery life and was operating with very restricted dive endurance, due to poor maintenance from Hindustan Shipyard Limited. Despite this, she conducted multiple deterrent patrols in the area.
