= INAS 300 =

- Active: 7 July 1960 – present
- Country: India
- Branch: Indian Navy
- Garrison/HQ: INS Hansa
- Nickname: The White Tigers

Aircraft flown
- Fighter: Hawker Sea Hawk (historical); BAE Sea Harrier (retired); MiG-29KUB (current)

The INAS 300 is the longest serving combat unit of the Indian Navy, based at INS Hansa.

== History ==
The White Tigers were commissioned on 7 July 1959 at RNAS Brawdy, United Kingdom with the Indian High Commissioner to UK, Vijay Laxmi Pandit, in attendance. The first Squadron Commander was Lt Cdr B D Law. The squadron was initially equipped with the Hawker Sea Hawk aircraft. On 18 May 1961, Lt Cdr R. H. Tahiliani carried out the first deck landing on INS Vikrant on Sea Hawk IN 156. The squadron left RNAS Brawdy on 31 July 1961 with eleven Hawker Sea Hawks and embarked INS Vikrant off the Isle of Wight. During the course of the next ten years the Indian Navy inducted fifty-four Sea Hawks in a phased manner, the last aircraft being delivered in December 1971. The Sea Hawks were retired from the Indian Navy in a phased manner in the late-70s and early-80s. The Sea Harriers were replaced by MiG-29KUBs on 11 May 2016 in a ceremony held at INS Hansa. They now act as an operational conversion unit for fighter pilots after completing Naval Orientation Flying form INAS 551. Later they qualify to the operational squadron, the INAS 303 (nicknamed Black Panthers).

== Gallery ==
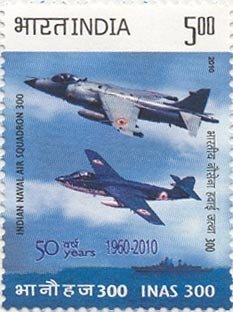
50 years of INAS 300 postal stamp (2010)

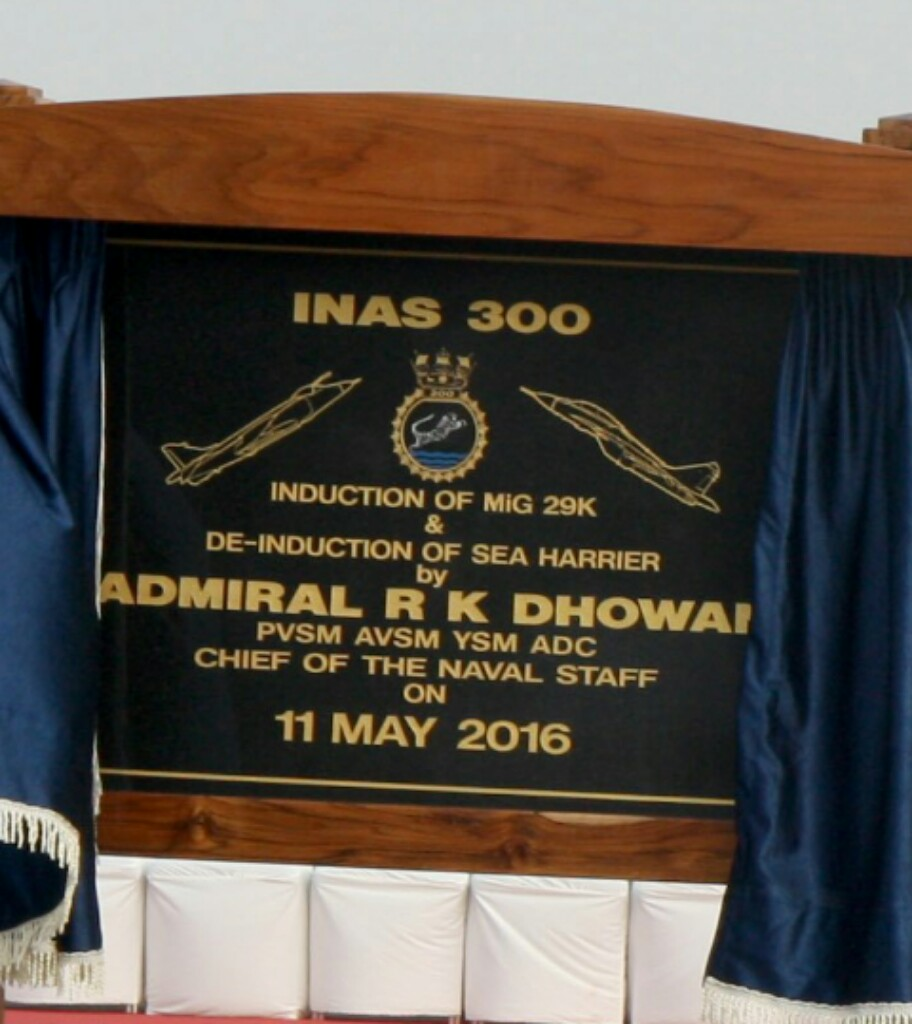
Plaque commemorating the retirement of the Sea Harrier

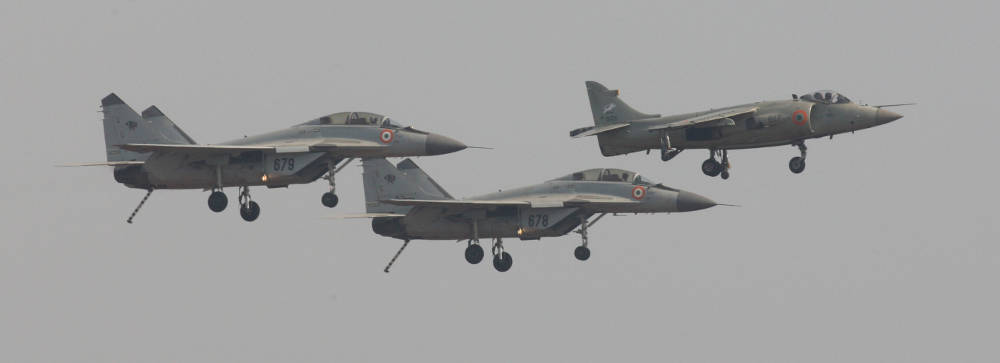
A Sea Harrier flanked by a pair of MiG-29Ks during the retirement of the Sea Harrier.
