= INS Karanj (S21) =

Indian Navy Kalvari-class submarine

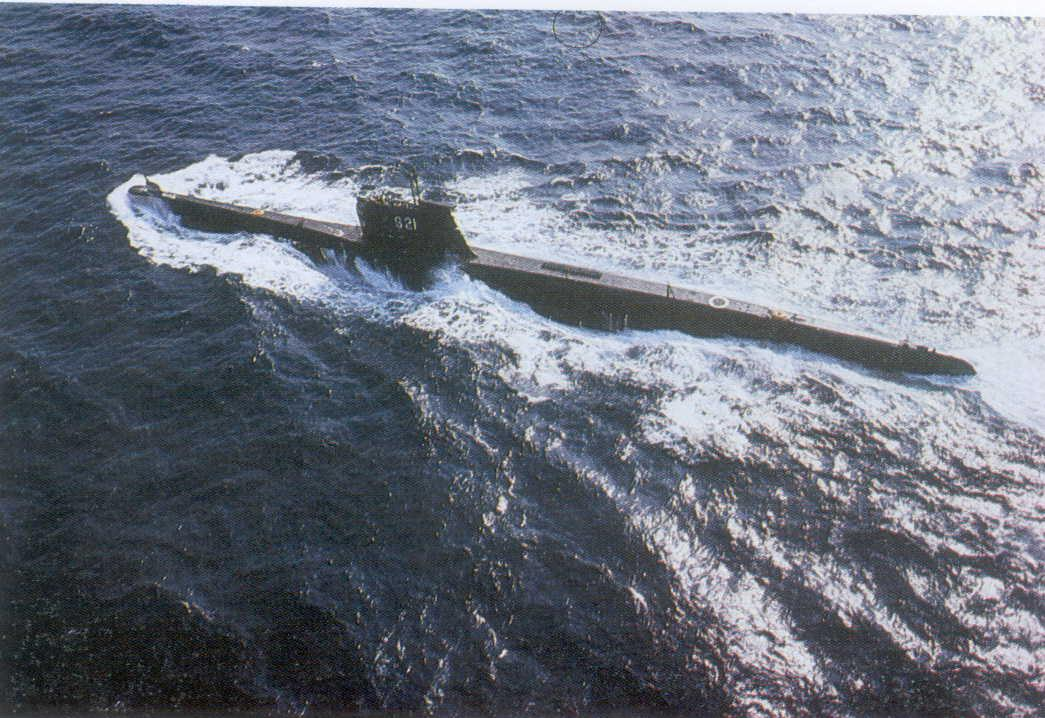
- INS Karanj underway

History

India
- Name: INS Karanj
- Namesake: Karanja
- Launched: 28 April 1968
- Commissioned: 4 September 1969
- Decommissioned: 1 August 2003
- Fate: Decommissioned

General characteristics
- Class & type: Kalvari-class submarine
- Displacement: 1,950 t (1,919 long tons) surfaced; 2,475 t (2,436 long tons) submerged
- Length: 91.3 m (299 ft 6 in)
- Beam: 7.5 m (24 ft 7 in)
- Draught: 6 m (19 ft 8 in)
- Speed: 16 knots (30 km/h; 18 mph) surfaced; 15 knots (28 km/h; 17 mph) submerged
- Range: 20,000 mi (32,000 km) at 8 kn (15 km/h; 9.2 mph) surfaced; 380 mi (610 km) at 10 kn (19 km/h; 12 mph) submerged
- Test depth: 250 m (820 ft)
- Complement: 75 (incl 8 officers)
- Armament: 10 533 mm (21 in) torpedo tubes with 22 SET-65E/SAET-60 torpedoes; 44 mines in lieu of torpedoes

INS Karanj (S21) was a Kalvari-class diesel-electric submarine of the Indian Navy.

The ship was named after the Karanja island, also known as Uran island, located in the Raigad district of Maharashtra.

== Operational history ==
In 1970, Karanj was badly damaged after a collision with the destroyer Ranjit when she surfaced directly below the ship. As no drawings of the damaged portions of the boat were available with the Bombay Dockyard or the Indian Navy, it was decided to use Karanj's sister ship INS Kursura, which was already docked at Bombay, as the design template for the metal work, and Karanj was repaired within months, in time to join the Indo-Pakistani War of 1971.

On 30 November, she rendezvoused with INS Kursura at sea to transfer instructions. Kursura would sail from eastern command to reinforce the western command and replace INS Kalvari at Bombay, as she was deemed the best ready ship in the fleet.

INS Karanj was initially deployed in the Bay of Bengal during the conflict and it was reported that she came under attack by the submarine PNS Ghazi prior to INS Rajput sinking her with depth charges. INS Karanj only recorded muffled sounds of explosions when the Ghazi was struck and sank. She then proceeded to the Western theater with orders to remain off station near Makran to cover Indian cruiser formations. Indian submarines were only cleared to attack Pakistani flagged ships. The submarine also detected another submarine during the conflict, but no torpedoes were fired against it. She also monitored and provide ELINT data to the ships in Operation Trident and Operation Python. The submarine was submerged during the whole operation. Prior to her retirement in 2003, she served as trials as platform for validating the command and communication systems for the Arihant-class including the Rani and Pachendriya sonar equipment.

== Popular culture ==
The 2017 film Ghazi, features the story of men aboard S21 who managed to survive underwater for 18 days. The film present the submarine crew to have sunk Ghazi instead of the INS Rajput.
