= Kalvari-class submarine (1967) =

Type of Soviet submarine

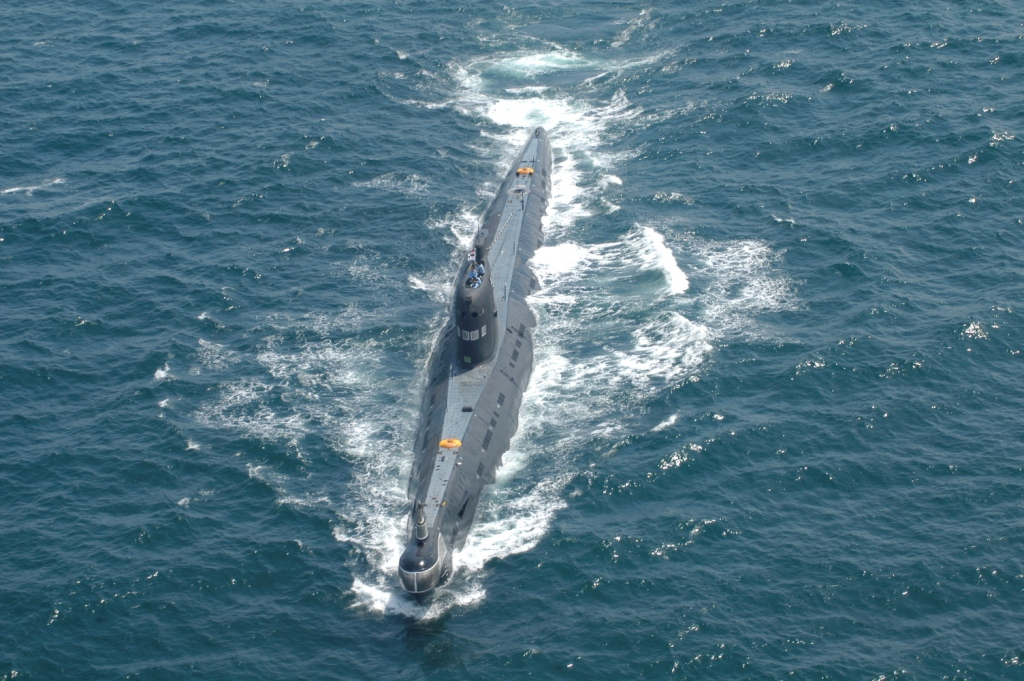
- Kalvari-class (Foxtrot-class) submarine of the Indian Navy

Class overview
- Name: Kalvari class
- Builders: Sudomekh, Admiralty Shipyard
- Operators: Indian Navy
- Succeeded by: Vela class
- In commission: 1967–2003
- Completed: 4
- Retired: 4
- Preserved: 1

General characteristics
- Type: Submarine
- Displacement: 1,950 t (1,919 long tons) surfaced; 2,475 t (2,436 long tons) submerged
- Length: 91.3 m (299 ft 6 in)
- Beam: 7.5 m (24 ft 7 in)
- Draught: 6 m (19 ft 8 in)
- Speed: 16 knots (30 km/h; 18 mph) surfaced; 15 knots (28 km/h; 17 mph) submerged
- Range: 20,000 mi (32,000 km) at 8 knots (15 km/h; 9.2 mph) surfaced; 380 mi (610 km) at 10 knots (19 km/h; 12 mph) submerged
- Test depth: 250 m (820 ft)
- Complement: 75 (incl 8 officers)
- Sensors & processing systems: Panchendriya sonar
- Armament: 10 533mm torpedo tubes with 22 SET-65E/SAET-60 torpedoes; 44 mines in lieu of torpedoes

Kalvari-class submarines were the first submarines inducted into the Indian Navy. They were variants of the early Soviet Foxtrot-class submarines. Four of the class served in the Indian Navy. Four additional variants of the later Foxtrot class were inducted as the Vela class.

INS Kursura has been preserved as a museum on Ramakrishna Beach in Visakhapatnam. The sail of the lead vessel, INS Kalvari is also on display at the Visakhapatnam city museum. Prior to the commissioning of INS Chakra, The Soviet Navy had offered to fit nuclear propulsion into this class. The Project was turned down due to the age of the submarines.

== Ships ==
Name	Pennant	Builder	Commissioned	Decommissioned	Status
INS Kalvari	S23	Sudomekh	8 December 1967	31 May 1996	Sail on display
INS Khanderi	S22	Sudomekh	6 December 1968	18 October 1989	Sail on display
INS Karanj	S21	Sudomekh	4 September 1969	1 August 2003	
INS Kursura	S20	Sudomekh	18 December 1969	27 September 2001	As a museum

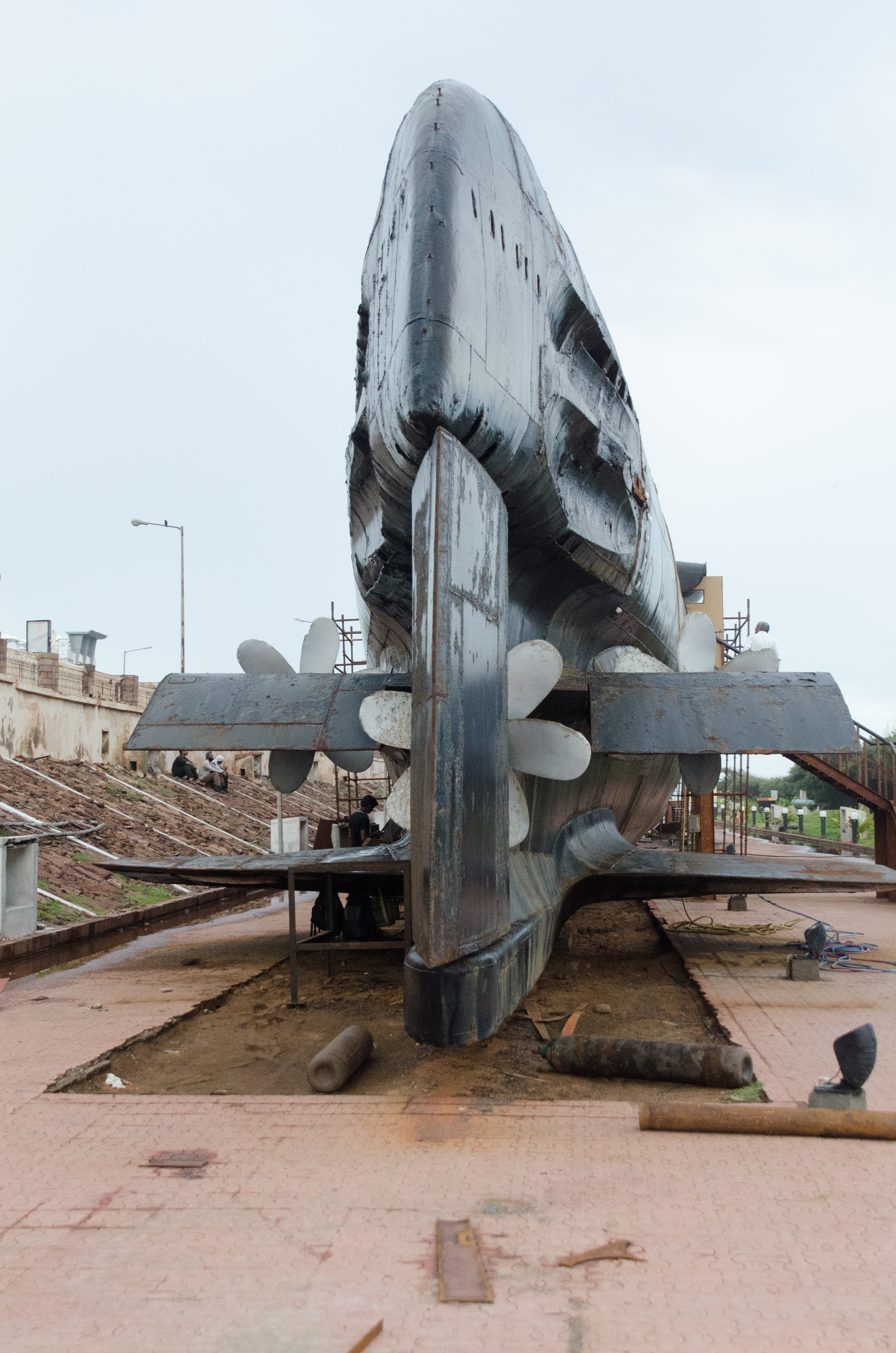
INS Kursura in dry dock

== See also ==
Equivalent submarines of the same era

- Uzushio class
- Type 035
- Potvis class
- Oberon class
- Barbel class
