= Admiral (India) =

Rank in the Indian navy

Admiral एडमिरल
- Flag of Chief of the Naval Staff of the Indian Navy

- Shoulder and sleeve insignia of Admiral in the Indian Navy

- Vehicle Star Plate of The Admiral
- Country: India
- Service branch: Indian Navy
- Abbreviation: Adm
- Rank group: Flag officer
- Rank: Four-star rank
- NATO rank code: OF 9
- Pay grade: Level 18
- Next higher rank: Admiral of the fleet
- Next lower rank: Vice admiral
- Equivalent ranks: General (Indian Army); Air chief marshal (Indian Air Force)

Admiral is a four-star naval flag officer rank in the Indian Navy. It is the highest active rank in the Indian Navy. Admiral ranks above the three-star rank of vice admiral and below the five-star rank of admiral of the fleet, which has never been awarded or held.

An admiral may be referred to as a full admiral or four-star admiral to distinguish them from lower flag officer ranks like vice admiral and rear admiral. The equivalent rank in the Indian Army is general and in the Indian Air Force is air chief marshal.

== History ==
The rank is held by the Chief of the Naval Staff (CNS), the professional head of the Indian Navy, since 1968. The rank may also be held by the Chief of Defence Staff (CDS) if the holder is a serving Indian Navy flag officer. Admiral Adhar Kumar Chatterji was the first Indian officer to hold the rank of full admiral. The current Chief of the Naval Staff (CNS) and only full admiral in the Indian Armed Forces is Admiral Krishna Swaminathan.

== Insignia ==
The flag of an admiral has a gold-blue octagon bearing naval crest in the middle, and four blue stars placed vertically at hoist side. This new design was introduced in September 2022. Earlier, the flag of an admiral had a horizontal red stripe and a vertical red stripe intersecting at the centre. On top of the intersection is superimposed a navy-blue Ashoka Chakra.

The badges of rank have a crossed sword and baton over four eight-pointed stars and the Ashoka emblem above, on a golden shoulder board. An admiral wears gorget patches which are golden patches with four white stars and additional oak leaves under them. In addition to this, the double-breasted reefer jacket has four golden sleeve stripes consisting of a broad band with three narrower bands.

== Appointment and term length ==
Appointments to the office of CNS are made by the Appointments Committee of the Cabinet (ACC), which is chaired by the Prime Minister of India.

The term length of the Chief of Naval Staff is three years or until the age of 62 of the holder, whichever is earlier.

== Order of precedence ==
An admiral ranks at No. 12 on the Indian order of precedence, along with the CDS and the Chiefs of Staff of the Indian Army and Indian Air Force (the COAS and the CAS). An admiral is at pay level 18, equivalent to Cabinet Secretary of India (at No. 11 on the warrant of precedence), with a monthly pay of ₹250,000 (US$3,500).

== See also ==
- Chief of the Naval Staff
- List of serving admirals of the Indian Navy
- Naval ranks and insignia of India

== Bibliography ==
- Singh, Anup (2018), Blue Waters Ahoy!: The Indian Navy 2001–2010, HarperCollins Publishers India, ISBN 978-9353025526
