= Elenjikal Chandy Kuruvila =

Indian Navy officer (1922–1994)

Vice Admiral E. Chandy Kuruvila PVSM, AVSM
- Born: 4 October 1922; Bangalore, Kingdom of Mysore, British India
- Died: 17 March 1994 (aged 71); Ooty, Nilgiris district, Tamil Nadu, India
- Military career
- Allegiance: British Raj; India
- Branch: Royal Indian Navy; Indian Navy
- Service years: 1942–1976
- Rank: Vice Admiral
- Nicknames: Chandy; Thambi
- Commands: Southern Naval Area; Western Fleet; INS Vikrant; 15th Frigate Squadron; INS Trishul (F143); INS Garuda; INS Kistna
- Conflicts: World War II; Indo-Pakistani War of 1971
- Awards: Param Vishisht Seva Medal; Ati Vishisht Seva Medal
- Other work: Chairman and Managing Director Mazagon Dock Limited

Vice Admiral Elenjikal Chandy Kuruvila, PVSM, AVSM was a former Flag officer in the Indian Navy. He was the Fleet commander of the Western Fleet during the Indo-Pakistani War of 1971, for which he was awarded the Param Vishisht Seva Medal. He later led the Southern Naval Area and then served as the chairman and managing director of Mazagon Dock Limited.

== Early life and education ==
Kuruvila was born on 4 October 1922 in a wealthy Syrian Christian Elenjikal family to E. J. Kuruvila, a businessman who set up the Annamalais Timber Trust Company, and Anna Kuruvila, daughter of Chandy. He was born in Bangalore and grew up in Bangalore and Thrissur. He attended the St. Thomas College, Thrissur and later the Madras Christian College (MCC). At MCC, he met and befriended K. M. Mathew, later the editor-in-chief of the Malayalam-language daily, Malayala Manorama.

Kuruvila applied for a commission in the Royal Indian Naval Volunteer Reserve (RINVR). Successful in the written test and the interview, he was commissioned in the RINVR on his 20th birthday, 4 October 1942 as an Acting Sub-lieutenant in the Executive Branch.

== Naval career ==
=== Early career ===
As a temporary Sub-Lieutenant, Kuruvila served on the auxiliary patrol vessel HMIS Sitakhoond. On 13 May 1944, he was promoted to the rank of Lieutenant. He later served on the Black Swan-class sloop HMIS Sutlej when it was deployed in the Bay of Bengal. He then served on the Bangor-class minesweeper HMIS Carnatic (J199). In 1945, he participated in Operation Dracula, the amphibious assault on Burma. After the war, he was granted a permanent commission in the Royal Indian Navy (RIN). He was selected to attend the Long Gunnery course in 1947, thus becoming the first Long 'G' officer post-Independence, and embarked for the United Kingdom. He attended the Royal Naval College, Greenwich where he and Sir Henry Leach, who rose to become the First Sea Lord and Chief of the Naval Staff of the Royal Navy were course-mates. Kuruvila quickly became popular with the course and with the locals.

=== Post-Independence ===
He completed the course at HMS Excellent on Whale Island at Portsmouth in January 1948. After completing the gunnery course, he returned to India and was appointed an instructor at the gunnery school in Cochin, which later became the INS Dronacharya. He later served on the R-class destroyer INS Ranjit (1949) and was appointed the first lieutenant of the ship. The Ranjit was commanded by Commander S M Nanda. Kuruvila was promoted to acting lieutenant-commander (paid) on 31 December 1950.

In early 1952, Princess Elizabeth and Prince Philip, Duke of Edinburgh set out for a tour of Australia and New Zealand by way of Kenya. The Rajput and the Ranjit were nominated to escort HMY Britannia from Mombasa to Australia. With the death of King George VI, this was cancelled. To commemorate the Coronation of Elizabeth II, a massive Coronation review of the fleet was held at Portsmouth. The flagship INS Delhi, destroyer INS Ranjit and frigate INS Tir (K256) represented India at the review. A naval armada consisting of ships from the Indian Navy, Royal Navy, Royal Australian Navy and the Royal New Zealand Navy sailed from Portsmouth to Gibraltar. The fleet carried out exercises along the way and was under the command of Lord Mountbatten. The Ranjit under Nanda acquitted itself well during these exercises. Subsequently, the Indian ships continued conducting exercises with the Mediterranean Fleet. They sailed from Gibraltar to Malta, the Greek islands and to Istanbul.

In 1953, he was selected to attend the Defence Services Staff College, Wellington. In January 1956, Kuruvila was appointed to the staff at the High Commission of India in London in the rank of Commander. The High Commissioner of India to the United Kingdom during his stint was Vijaya Lakshmi Pandit. India was in the process of acquiring the Crown Colony-class cruiser HMS Nigeria (60) which became the INS Mysore (C60). Apart from the Mysore which was to become the flagship, three anti-submarine warfare (ASW) Blackwood-class frigates were also being acquired which were to become INS Khukri (F149), INS Kirpan (F144) and INS Kuthar (F146). Kuruvila was the liaison officer at the Admiralty during the acquisition of these ships. He visited the ASW ships periodically and provided help and advice to the commissioning commanding officers. He was promoted substantive commander on 30 June 1957.

After a three-year stint, in 1959, Kuruvila returned to India was appointed Commander (Executive officer) of the erstwhile flagship – the Leander-class cruiser INS Delhi (C74). The Delhi was commanded by Captain Nilakanta Krishnan. Krishnan and Kuruvila made a great team and led the ship admirably. In March 1960, the Delhi, under Krishnan, was part of the fleet in the Joint Commonwealth exercises which was the largest till then, with the Royal Navy, Royal Australian Navy, Royal Ceylon Navy, Pakistan Navy, Royal New Zealand Navy and Royal Malaysian Navy participating.

In 1960, Kuruvila was appointed commanding officer of the cadet training ship, the Black Swan-class sloop INS Kistna. His executive officer on the Kistna was Lieutenant Commander Mahendra Nath Mulla. In July 1961, he led the ship, which was part of a squadron consisting of the INS Mysore (C60) and the Leopard-class frigate INS Beas (1958) on a goodwill tour to East Africa. Kistna and Beas called on Tanga and participated in the celebrations of Tanganyika National Union Day. Thereafter, for a short stint, he also commanded the Naval air station INS Garuda at Cochin. In 1963, Kuruvila was promoted to the acting rank of Captain and appointed Captain (F) 15th Frigate squadron as well as the Commanding Officer of the lead frigate of the squadron, the Whitby-class frigate INS Trishul (F143). The other ship in the squadron was INS Talwar (F140). He was promoted to the substantive rank of Captain on 30 June 1964.

After a two-year stint, in 1965, Kuruvila was appointed commanding officer of INS Circars, the boys' training establishment in Visakhapatnam. In early 1967, he attended the National Defence College as part of the 7th course. After the course, in December that year, he took over as the fifth commanding officer of the Navy's flagship – the aircraft carrier INS Vikrant. He commanded the Vikrant for two full years, till December 1969. After handing over command to Captain Kirpal Singh, he moved to Naval Headquarters. He was promoted to the rank of Commodore and officiated as the Chief of Personnel (COP) at Naval HQ. As the COP, he also served as the President of the Services Sport Control Board.

=== Flag rank ===
In August 1970, Kuruvila was appointed the next Commander of the Western Fleet. In October, he was promoted to the rank of Rear Admiral and took over as the third Flag Officer Commanding Western Fleet (FOCWF) from Rear Admiral V. A. Kamath. As the FOCWF, Kuruvila flew his flag on his old ship, the Vikrant. On 26 January 1971, he was awarded the Ati Vishisht Seva Medal for distinguished service of an exceptional order.

=== Indo-Pakistani War of 1971 ===
The Indo-Pakistani War of 1971 was sparked by the Bangladesh Liberation war, a conflict between the traditionally dominant West Pakistanis and the majority East Pakistanis. In 1970, East Pakistanis demanded autonomy for the state, but the Pakistani government failed to satisfy these demands and, in early 1971, a demand for secession took root in East Pakistan. In March, the Pakistan Armed Forces launched a fierce campaign to curb the secessionists, the latter including soldiers and police from East Pakistan. Thousands of East Pakistanis died, and nearly ten million refugees fled to West Bengal, an adjacent Indian state. In April, India decided to assist in the formation of the new nation of Bangladesh.

In mid-1971, the aircraft carrier Vikrant, along with the frigates INS Brahmaputra (1957) and INS Beas (1958) were moved from the Western Fleet to the Eastern Naval Command. With this, the Eastern Fleet came into being. The Mysore, commanded by Captain R K S Ghandhi, became the flagship of the Western Fleet on which Kuruvila flew his flag. He argued in favour of using the Vidyut-class missile boats offensively. He suggested that taking the missile boats in tow with the Fleet would "decisively tilt the scales in any encounter between the opposing Fleets." He even wrote to the Flag Officer Commanding-in-Chief (FOC-in-C) Western Naval Command Vice Admiral Surendra Nath Kohli in a proposal stating:

"I have no doubt whatsoever that the correct utilisation of the missile boats is to use them offensively, two at a time, in company with the Fleet. If I have these boats with me at sea, as your Fleet Commander I can guarantee total victory once contact has been made with enemy surface units, regard less of his superiority in speed and gun power".

=== ORBAT ===
The Order of Battle of the Western Fleet in 1971 was:
Fleet Commander: Rear Admiral Elenjikal Chandy Kuruvila, PVSM

Flag Ship INS Mysore - Captain RKS Gandhi, VrC

15th Frigate Squadron

- INS Trishul - Captain KMV Nair, VrC
- INS Talwar - Commander SS Kumar, VrC

14th Frigate Squadron

- INS Khukri - Captain Mahendra Nath Mulla, MVC
- INS Kirpan - Commander RR Sood, VrC, NM
- INS Kuthar - Commander UC Tripathi, NM

31 Patrol Squadron

Patrol Vessels

- INS Kiltan - Commander KP Gopal Rao, MVC, VSM
- INS Katchall - Commander KN Zadu, VrC
- INS Kadmatt - Commander Sukhmal Jain, NM

Frigates

- INS Cauvery - Commander IK Erry
- INS Kistna - Commander RAJ Anderson, VSM
- INS Tir - Commander M Pratap

Destroyer

- INS Ranjit - Commander RN Singh

Submarines

- INS Karanj - Commander Vijai Singh Shekhawat, VrC
- INS Kursura - Commander Arun Auditto, NM

OSA Class Patrol Boats 25 K Squadron - Commander Babru Bhan Yadav, MVC

251K Division

- INS Nashak - Lieutenant Commander RB Suri
- INS Nipat - Lieutenant Commander BN Kavina, VrC
- INS Nirghat - Lieutenant Commander J Sharma, AVSM, VrC
- INS Nirbhik - Lieutenant Commander SC Issacs

252 K Division

- INS Vijeta - Commander AK Parti
- INS Vinash - Lieutenant Commander Vijay Jerath, VrC
- INS Veer - Lieutenant Commander OP Mehta, VrC, NM
- INS Vidyut - Lieutenant Commander BB Singh

==== Operation Trident & Operation Python ====
On 4 December, the fleet successfully executed Operation Trident, a devastating attack on the Pakistan Naval Headquarters at Karachi that sank a minesweeper, a destroyer and an ammunition supply ship. The attack also irreparably damaged another destroyer and oil storage tanks at the Karachi port. To commemorate this, 4 December is celebrated as the Navy Day. This was followed by Operation Python on 8 December 1971, further deprecating the Pakistan Navy's capabilities.

For his command of the Western Fleet during the war, Kuruvila was awarded the Param Vishisht Seva Medal (PVSM) on 26 January 1972. The citation for the PVSM reads as follows:

CITATION

REAR ADMIRAL ELENJIKAL CHANDY KURUVILA, AVSM

Flag Officer Commanding Western Fleet

REAR ADMIRAL ELENJIKAL CHANDY KURUVILA, Flag Officer Commanding, Western Fleet, was the Operational Commander of all Indian Naval forces in the Western Sector, He was responsible for the Defence of the Western Coast and for conduct of offensive operations against Pakistan's Naval forces at Sea. The officer guided the Naval operations in his theatre of war with exemplary skill and determination and displayed an offensive spirit and ingenuity of the. highest order in the execution of Naval war plans. His forces gained a decisive victory over the enemy in the crucial Naval action of the war and attacked the so far impregnable defences of Karachi port causing serious damage to vital harbour installations. The officer's action confined the Pakistani Naval ships to the sanctuary of Karachi s inner harbour, giving us Undisputed superiority in Pakistani waters. This denied enemy forces the much needed support from outside the country and severely restricted their ability to continue to fight. He has displayed outstanding leadership and ability in the conduct of his duties as Flag Officer Commanding Western Fleet.

=== Post-war career ===
Kuruvila continued to lead the Western Fleet after the war. In May 1972, he led two ships of the fleet – the flagship Mysore flying his flag and the Leopard-class frigate INS Betwa (F139) to a goodwill visit to ports in the gulf. The ships called on Muscat, Abu Dhabi, Bahrain and Kuwait.

In March 1973, he was appointed Flag Officer Commanding Southern Naval Area (FOCSOUTH). He took over as the second FOCSOUTH from Rear Admiral V A Kamath. This was a short stint, as he was appointed chairman and managing director (CMD) of the Mazagon Dock Limited (MDL) in Mumbai. During his stint as CMD of MDL, he was promoted to the rank of Vice Admiral. Kuruvila retired from the Navy on 1 March 1976.

== Personal life and later life ==
Kuruvila married Pinky and the couple had two daughters – Pria and Laila. After Pinky's death in 1982, Kuruvila married Priya. The Kuruvilas moved to Ooty after his retirement. He served as the President of the Ootacamund Club from 1987 to 1990. He died in Ooty in March 1994.

== Bibliography ==
- Cardozo, Ian (2006), The sinking of INS Khukri : survivors' stories, Lotus Collection, ISBN 978-8174364999
- Hiranandani, G M (2000), Transition to Triumph: History of the Indian Navy, 1965-1975, Spantech & Lancer, ISBN 978-1897829691
- Krishnan, Arjun (2014), A Sailor's story, Punya Publications, ISBN 978-8189534141
- Leach, Sir Henry (1993), Endure No Makeshifts: Some Naval Recollections, Combined Books, ISBN 978-0850523706
- Mathew, K.M. (2015), The Eighth Ring: An Autobiography, Penguin Books Limited, ISBN 978-0670088607
- Nanda, S.M. (2004), The Man who Bombed Karachi, HarperCollins Publishers India, ISBN 978-8172235628
- Sahai, Baldeo (2006), Indian Navy, a Perspective: From the Earliest Period to Modern Times, Publications Division, ISBN 978-8123013541
- Sarma, S H (2001), My years at sea, Lancer Publishers & Distributors, ISBN 978-8170621218
- Singh, Satyindra (1991), Blueprint to bluewater: The Indian Navy, 1951-65, Lancer International, ISBN 978-8170621485

Military offices
Preceded by Jal Cursetji	Commanding Officer INS Vikrant; 1967–1969	Succeeded by Kirpal Singh
Preceded by Jal Cursetji	Chief of Personnel (officiating); 1970–1970	Succeeded by R N Batra
Preceded by V. A. Kamath	Flag Officer Commanding Western Fleet; 1970–1973	Succeeded by Kirpal Singh
Preceded by V. A. Kamath	Flag Officer Commanding Southern Naval Area; 1973–1973	Succeeded by S H Sarma
