= V. A. Kamath =

Indian naval flag officer (1921–2017)

Vice Admiral V A Kamath PVSM
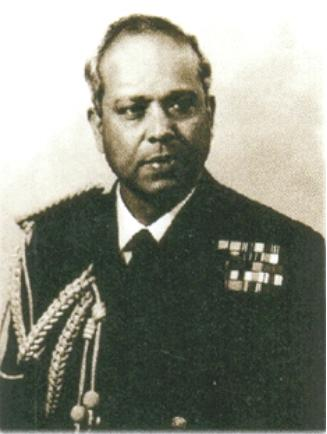
- Born: March 1921; Madras Presidency, British Raj
- Died: 15 January 2017 (aged 95)
- Military career
- Allegiance: British India (1939–1947); India (from 1947)
- Branch: Royal Indian Navy; Indian Navy; Indian Coast Guard
- Service years: 1939–1980
- Rank: Vice Admiral
- Nickname: Vasu
- Commands: Indian Coast Guard; Southern Naval Area; Western Fleet; INS Vikrant; INS Trishul (F143); INS Tir (K256)
- Conflicts: World War II; Indo-Pakistani War of 1971
- Awards: Param Vishisht Seva Medal

Vice Admiral Vasudeva Anant Kamath, PVSM (1921–2017) was a former Flag officer in the Indian Navy. He was the founding Director General of the Indian Coast Guard, which he led from 1978 to 1980. He also served as the 4th Vice Chief of the Naval Staff (VCNS) from 1973 to 1977, the longest tenure in the Indian Navy's history. During the Indo-Pakistani War of 1971, he led the Southern Naval Area, for which he was awarded the Param Vishisht Seva Medal.

== Early life ==
V.A. Kamath was born in 1921 to Dr A V Kamath, a doctor working for the government of Madras Presidency. He was the oldest of nine children – five boys and four girls. Two of the brothers joined the Indian Navy while another joined the Indian Air Force, retiring as a Wing Commander. The other two brothers joined the Merchant navy and the Indian Railways.

== Naval career ==
=== Early career ===
Kamath joined the Indian Mercantile Marine Training Ship (IMMTS) Dufferin as a cadet in 1936. In December 1938, he was one of three cadets selected to join the Royal Indian Navy (RIN). The other two cadets later joined the Pakistan Navy and rose to become its commander-in-chief – A. R. Khan and S. M. Ahsan. After joining the RIN, Kamath was trained in the United Kingdom. He was trained on the Hawkins-class cruiser HMS Frobisher (D81) and then on HMS Vindictive (1918).

=== World War II ===
With the outbreak of World War II, Kamath was promoted to the rank of Midshipman and posted to the Revenge-class battleship HMS Royal Sovereign (05), part of the 2nd Battle Squadron of the Home Fleet. The Royal Sovereign was assigned to the 2nd Battle Squadron of the Home Fleet. She was assigned to the North Atlantic Escort Force, which was based in Halifax, Nova Scotia, and was tasked with protecting convoys to Britain. In July 1940, he was aboard the ship when she participated in the Battle of Calabria.

On 1 May 1941, Kamath was commissioned as an acting Sub-Lieutenant. He was subsequently trained at the Anti-Submarine school in Castle barracks in Bombay. After the course, he was posted as anti-submarine warfare officer to the sloop HMIS Clive which was a part of the Eastern Fleet. In February 1943, he was posted as an instructor to HMIS Bahadur, the boys' training establishment in Karachi. He also served at the junior boys' training establishment HMIS Dilawar.

In 1944, Kamath was selected to attend the Long Gunnery course and embarked for the United Kingdom. He completed the course at HMS Excellent on Whale Island at Portsmouth in December 1944. After completing the gunnery course, he returned to India and was posted to HMIS Himalaya, the RIN gunnery school in Karachi, as an instructor. After a two-year stint, he was selected to take Indian ratings to the United Kingdom to train them at the Excellent. This was done since the Leander-class cruiser HMS Achilles (70) was being acquired by the Indian Navy as INS Delhi (C74) and Kamath was to be the commissioning gunnery officer.

=== Post-Independence ===
Kamath was promoted to the acting rank of lieutenant commander in July 1948. The Delhi was commissioned on 5 July 1948 by the High Commissioner of India to the United Kingdom V. K. Krishna Menon. She was commanded by Captain H N S Brown, her executive officer was Commander Ram Dass Katari and Lieutenant Commander Sardarilal Mathradas Nanda, her first lieutenant. On her way to India, she called at Portsmouth, Portland, Gibraltar and Malta. The Prime Minister of India Jawaharlal Nehru himself welcomed the ship at Bombay. She went on a cruise round the coasts of India, calling at Karwar, Cochin, Trincomalee, Madras, Vizag, Calcutta, Port Blair, Colombo and Calicut before returning to Bombay. In May 1949, she left on her Indian Ocean cruise. She called at Victoria, Seychelles, Port Louis in Mauritius, Dar es Salaam in Tanzania and Mombasa in Kenya. The cruise to the Indian Ocean republics and East Africa generated a tremendous amount of goodwill.

Kamath was promoted substantive lieutenant-commander on 16 March 1950. On 24 September 1952, he was promoted to the acting rank of Commander and appointed Director of Naval Plans at Naval Headquarters. He was promoted to substantive commander on 31 December 1953. In 1955, he was appointed Commander (Executive Officer) of INS Delhi. In 1956, he took command of the training ship INS Tir (K256). After a year-long stint, he was appointed Chief Instructor at the Defence Services Staff College, Wellington on 25 February 1957, with the acting rank of captain. By 1959, two Whitby-class Anti-submarine frigates (ASW frigate) were launched in the United Kingdom and were to join the Indian Navy as INS Talwar (F140) and INS Trishul (F143). Kamath was selected to be the commissioning commanding officer of Trishul. Trishul was the first ASW frigate to join the Indian Navy. After commissioning in January 1960, he led the ship on exercises around the UK and sailed for India. She called on Toulon, Naples and Athens and arrived in Bombay in May 1960. Kamath was promoted to substantive captain on 30 June 1960.

In 1961, Kamath moved to Naval HQ having been appointed Director of Naval Plans for the second time, this time in the rank of captain. After a short stint, he was appointed Director of Naval Armament Inspection (DNAI). He served in this appointment during the Annexation of Goa. In late 1964, Kamath was appointed the third commanding officer of the Navy's flagship – the aircraft carrier INS Vikrant. He took command from Captain Nilakanta Krishnan in November. In early 1965, he led the ship in large air-sea exercises in the Arabian Sea. The Chief of the Naval Staff Vice Admiral Bhaskar Sadashiv Soman flew his flag on the flagship Vikrant. During the Indo-Pakistani War of 1965, the Vikrant was under refit and did not sail and participate. However, her squadrons – INAS 300 and participated in the war. In late-1966, Kamath was selected to attend the Imperial Defence College.

=== Flag Rank ===
After returning to India, in January 1968, he was appointed Chief of Materiel at Naval HQ in the acting rank of rear admiral. After a year-long stint, he was appointed the next Commander of the Western Fleet. In January 1969, he took over as the second Flag Officer Commanding Western Fleet (FOCWF) from Rear Admiral Sourendra Nath Kohli. As the FOCWF, Kamath flew his flag on his old ship the Vikrant. In February, he led the INS Mysore (C60), INS Godavari (D92) and the INS Gomati (D93) on a goodwill tour to Sri Lanka. He was at the helm of the Western Fleet for about eighteen months.

Until 1970, the Southern Naval Area with its headquarters in Cochin was commanded by an officer of the rank of Commodore designated Commodore-in-Charge Cochin (COMCHIN). In August 1970, the appointment was upgraded and re-designated Flag Officer Commanding Southern Naval Area (FOCSOUTH) and Kamath took over as the first FOCSOUTH. In December 1970, he took the salute at the passing out parade of the first batch of cadets at the Naval Academy in Cochin. He served in this appointment of FOC South during the Indo-Pakistani War of 1971. On 26 January 1972, he was awarded the Param Vishisht Seva Medal.

On 21 March 1973, he was promoted to the acting rank of vice admiral and was appointed the fourth Vice Chief of the Naval Staff (VCNS), with promotion to substantive vice-admiral on 26 March 1973. He succeeded Vice Admiral Jal Cursetji and had a long tenure of four years as VCNS. This remains the longest tenure that a VCNS has served. He retired on 31 March 1977, handing over to Vice Admiral Ronald Lynsdale Pereira.

=== Director General Indian Coast Guard ===
The Indian Coast Guard (ICG) came into being on 19 August 1978. The new service was to function under the overall command and control of a Director General (DGICG). Kamath was selected as the founding Director General of the Indian Coast Guard. Kamath proposed a five-year plan to develop the ICG into a potent force by 1984. After a two-year stint, he retired after handing over the command of the Coast Guard to Vice Admiral Swaraj Parkash in 1980.

== Personal life ==
Kamath married Lalitha Kamath (née) in 1945. The couple had one son and two daughters. Kamath died on 15 January 2017.

== Bibliography ==
- Singh, Satyindra (1986), Under two ensigns: The Indian Navy, 1945–1950, Oxford & IBH Pub. Co, ISBN 978-8120400948
- Singh, Satyindra (1991), Blueprint to bluewater: The Indian Navy, 1951-65, Lancer International, ISBN 978-8170621485
- Katari, Ram Dass (1983), A Sailor Remembers, Vikas, ISBN 9780706920642
- Sarma, S H (2001), My years at sea, Lancer Publishers & Distributors, ISBN 978-8170621218
- Levy, James P. (2003). The Royal Navy's Home Fleet in World War II. Hampshire, UK: Palgrave Macmillan. ISBN 1-4039-1773-6.

Military offices
Preceded by Nilakanta Krishnan	Commanding Officer INS Vikrant; 1964–1966	Succeeded by E. C. Kuruvila
Preceded by P. S. Mahindroo	Chief of Materiel; 1967–1968	Succeeded by K. L. Kulkarni
Preceded by Sourendra Nath Kohli	Flag Officer Commanding Western Fleet; 1969–1970	Succeeded by E. C. Kuruvila
New title Post upgraded	Flag Officer Commanding Southern Naval Area; 1970–1973	Succeeded by E. C. Kuruvila
Preceded by Jal Cursetji	Vice Chief of the Naval Staff; 1973–1977	Succeeded by Ronald Lynsdale Pereira
New title Indian Coast Guard established	Director General of the Indian Coast Guard; 1978–1980	Succeeded by Swaraj Parkash
