= P. S. Mahindroo =

Flag Officer in the Indian Navy

Rear Admiral P S Mahindroo PVSM
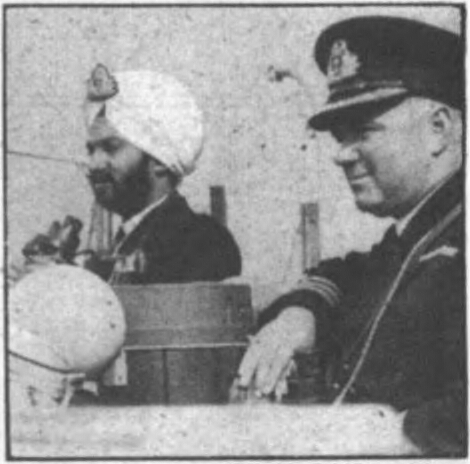
- Lt Cdr Mahindroo as navigating officer of HMIS Godavari, with Cdr J W Jefford
- Born: 17 April 1917; Amritsar, Punjab Province, British India
- Died: 8 October 1999 (aged 82); Chandigarh, India
- Military career
- Allegiance: British Raj; India
- Branch: Royal Indian Navy; Indian Navy
- Service years: 1939–1972
- Rank: Rear Admiral
- Nickname: Peter
- Commands: INS Vikrant; INS Delhi (C74)
- Conflicts: World War II
- Awards: Param Vishisht Seva Medal

Rear Admiral Pritam Singh 'Peter' Mahindroo, PVSM (1917–1999) was a Flag Officer in the Indian Navy. He was the first Sikh Admiral in the Indian Navy. He was the commissioning commanding officer of the Indian Navy's first aircraft carrier, INS Vikrant. He later served as the Chief of Materiel and as the director general, Naval Dockyard Expansion Scheme, before retiring in 1972.

== Naval career ==
Mahindroo was in the seventh batch of Indian cadet-entry officers to join the Indian Mercantile Marine Training Ship Dufferin, in 1933. After graduating from the Dufferin in December 1935, he joined the mercantile marine.

=== World War II ===
In September 1939, with the outbreak of the World War II, he joined the Royal Indian Naval Reserve (RINR) as an acting sub-lieutenant. He was initially denied entry since he refused to cut his hair, but later was accepted as the first turbaned officer in the navy. He first served on the Cornwallis-class sloop HMIS Pansy. After about two years on the sloop, he was transferred to the auxiliary patrol vessel HMIS Sonavati in December 1941. On 4 April 1942, he was made temporary lieutenant. Mahindroo was then transferred to the Bangor-class minesweeper HMIS Rajputana (J197) in December 1942.

On 22 June 1943, the Black Swan-class sloop HMIS Godavari was commissioned in Woolston, Southampton. The ship was in command of Commander James Wilfred Jefford, who later became the first commander-in-chief of the Royal Pakistan Navy. Mahindroo was the navigator and the only Indian among 14 British officers on board. The Godavari was deployed in the UK-Gibraltar route till the end of 1943, after which she was transferred to the East Indies Fleet. In December 1944, he was transferred to HMIS Akbar, the RIN training establishment in Bombay. He served in this appointment until the end of the war. He then led the parade of the Indian Naval contingent at the London Victory Celebrations of 1946.

=== Post-Independence ===
In 1949, India acquired three destroyers from the UK – HMS Rotherham (H09), HMS Redoubt (H41) and HMS Raider (H15) which were being renamed to INS Rajput (D141), INS Ranjit (1949) and INS Rana (D115). Mahindroo was appointed executive officer of the Rajput. In 1955, Mahindroo was promoted to the acting rank of captain and appointed chief instructor at the Defence Services Staff College (DSSC), Wellington. The Naval wing at DSSC was established in 1949–50 and Mahindroo was the first Indian chief instructor. On 2 July 1956, he was promoted substantive captain. After a stint of about three years at DSSC, he was appointed commanding officer of the navy's flagship – the INS Delhi (C74). He took over from Captain Benjamin Abraham Samson. The flag officer commanding Indian Fleet, Rear Admiral Ram Dass Katari, flew his flag on the Delhi. In June 1957, the Indian fleet called on ports in Africa with Mahindroo as the flag captain. After the Africa visit, the fleet sailed for Trincomalee for the annual joint commonwealth exercises with the Royal Navy, Royal Ceylon Navy and the Pakistan Navy. Mahindroo was in command of the Delhi during these exercises as well.

In March 1960, Mahindroo was summoned by the chief of the naval staff (CNS) Vice Admiral Ram Dass Katari and told that he was selected to command the Indian Navy's first aircraft carrier – INS Vikrant. In June, he embarked for Belfast where the ship was berthed. He then attended refresher courses at various training establishments and spent a week aboard HMS Ark Royal (91). The ship was commissioned on 4 March 1961 at 1000 hours by Vijaya Lakshmi Pandit, the High Commissioner of India to the United Kingdom. Mahindroo took the Vikrant from Belfast for Portsmouth in March 1961 and then to Portland for sea trials. Under him, in May, she embarked the Bréguet 1050 Alizés of INAS 310 in Toulon, France and then sailed for Malta for an intensive work-up. In August, Hawker Sea Hawks of INAS 300 also embarked in the English Channel. During the work-up and the trials, Mahindroo received kudos from the Commander-in-Chief Mediterranean Fleet for the carrier's excellent performance. He then brought the carrier home to India, calling on multiple ports on the way like Alexandria, Port Said and Aden, with INS Rajput as escort. Vikrant reached home waters by 3 November, where the two squadrons disembarked and she was welcomed by the flagship INS Mysore (C60) and aircraft of the Indian Air Force. The same day, Vikrant was welcomed by the Prime Minister of India, Jawaharlal Nehru, CNS Vice Admiral Katari and Flag Officer Bombay Rear Admiral S. G. Karmarkar.

In June 1962, Mahindroo led the Vikrant in exercises in the Arabian Sea, Bay of Bengal and off Malaya. After commanding the carrier for over two years, he relinquished command, handing over to Captain Nilakanta Krishnan in April 1963. He swapped places with Krishnan and was appointed commanding officer of the Navy's Engineering College INS Shivaji in Lonavala. After a short stint at Shivaji, in March 1964, Mahindroo was promoted to the rank of commodore and appointed commodore superintendent Naval Dockyard, Mumbai.

=== Flag rank ===
In February 1965, Mahindroo was appointed chief of materiel (COM) at Naval HQ and took over from Commodore Sourendra Nath Kohli. In August, the appointment was upgraded to flag rank and he was promoted to the rank of rear admiral. He served as the COM for about three years. In December 1967, he was appointed Director General Naval Dockyard Expansion Scheme (DG-NDES). He served in this appointment for long tenure of about six years. On 26 January 1972, he was awarded the Param Vishisht Seva Medal for distinguished service of the most exceptional order.

== Later life and death ==
Mahindroo moved to Chandigarh after his retirement and was an avid golfer, playing seven days a week. His son also joined the Navy and had a short stint. On 31 January 1997, INS Vikrant was decommissioned at the Naval Dockyard, Mumbai. The decommissioning ceremony was performed by Mahindroo, the carrier's first captain. He died in the Military Hospital, Chandimandir on 8 October 1999.

== Bibliography ==
- Singh, Satyindra (1986), Under two ensigns: The Indian Navy, 1945–1950, Oxford & IBH Pub. Co, ISBN 978-8120400948
- Singh, Satyindra (1991), Blueprint to bluewater: The Indian Navy, 1951-65, Lancer International, ISBN 978-8170621485
- Katari, Ram Dass (1983), A Sailor Remembers, Vikas, ISBN 9780706920642

Military offices
Preceded by Benjamin Abraham Samson	Commanding officer INS Delhi; 1957–1958	Succeeded by Nilakanta Krishnan
New title First holder	Commanding officer INS Vikrant; 1961–1963	Succeeded by Nilakanta Krishnan
Preceded by Nilakanta Krishnan	Commanding officer INS Shivaji; 1963–1964	Succeeded by T. N. Kochhar
Preceded by Sourendra Nath Kohli	Chief of Materiel; 1965–1968	Succeeded by V. A. Kamath
