= Nilakanta Krishnan =

Indian admiral (1919–82)

Vice Admiral Nilakanta Krishnan PVSM, DSC
- Born: 8 June 1919; Nagercoil, Travancore (now Tamil Nadu), British India
- Died: 30 January 1982 (aged 62); Hyderabad, Andhra Pradesh, India
- Military career
- Allegiance: British India (1938–1947); India (1947–1976)
- Branch: Royal Indian Navy; Indian Navy
- Service years: 1938–1976
- Rank: Vice Admiral
- Commands: Eastern Naval Command; Western Naval Command; INS Vikrant; INS Delhi; INS Tir
- Conflicts: World War II; Annexation of Goa; Indo-Pakistani War of 1971
- Awards: Padma Bhushan; Param Vishisht Seva Medal; Distinguished Service Cross
- Other work: Chairman and Managing Director, Cochin Shipyard Limited

Vice Admiral Nilakanta Krishnan, PVSM, DSC (8 June 1919 – 30 January 1982), was a former flag officer in the Indian Navy. He was the Flag Officer Commanding-in-Chief Eastern Naval Command during the 1971 Indo-Pakistani War.

Born in a Tamil Brahmin family in Nagercoil, Krishnan joined the Training Ship Dufferin in 1935, where his batchmate was Jal Cursetji. After training on various ships of the Royal Navy, he was posted to the survey ship HMIS Investigator. During the Anglo-Soviet invasion of Iran in August 1941, Krishnan boarded and captured an Iranian gunboat after a firefight. For this action, he was awarded the Distinguished Service Cross, the first awarded to the Royal Indian Navy.

Following the Independence of India, Krishnan served as Staff Officer Plans and later as Director of Naval Plans and Intelligence at Naval headquarters. He subsequently attended the Joint Services Staff College, Latimer and appointed Deputy Naval Advisor at High Commission of India in London. In 1951, he returned to India and commanded the 31st minesweeping squadron and subsequently the training ship INS Tir, which represented India at the Coronation review of the fleet. Krishnan subsequently served as the Director of Personnel Services at NHQ and Deputy Secretary (Military Wing) in the Cabinet Secretariat. Krishnan then commanded INS Delhi during the Annexation of Goa and the Navy's Engineering College INS Shivaji. In 1963, he took over as the second commanding officer of the aircraft carrier INS Vikrant. After attending the Imperial Defence College in 1965, he took over as the Naval advisor to the High Commissioner of India to the United Kingdom.

Promoted to flag rank in 1967, Krishnan was appointed the second Vice Chief of the Naval Staff. He subsequently commanded the Western Naval Command and then the Eastern Naval Command. He is credited with using a very innovative strategy, while commanding the Eastern Navy which had the aircraft carrier INS Vikrant, in the Bay of Bengal. He is believed to have tricked the Pakistani submarine PNS Ghazi, which was on a search and destroy mission, into entering Visakhapatnam; where it was eliminated. He was present at the Ramna Race Course when the Pakistani Instrument of Surrender was signed by Lieutenant General A. A. K. Niazi. He was awarded the Padma Bhushan, the third highest civilian award apart from the Param Vishisht Seva Medal.

== Early life and education ==
Krishnan was born into a Tamil Brahmin Iyer family based in Nagercoil. He was the youngest son of Rao Bahadur Mahadeva Nilakanta Ayyar, an Executive Engineer. He went on to serve as the Superintending engineer of Madras Presidency. While his eldest brother, Nilakanta Mahadeva Ayyar pursued his career in the Indian Civil Service, Krishnan joined the Royal Indian Navy. Krishnan's other brothers included Nilakanta Ganapathy Iyer and Nilakanta Anjaneya Subramanian. NA Subramanian was a Constitutional lawyer and a professor at Madras Law College and author of the book Case Law on the Indian Constitution. The third of five brothers was Dr Nilakanta Sitaraman, a Fellow of the Royal College of Physicians and a prominent doctor in their hometown Nagercoil and the neighboring area.

In 1935, Krishnan was successful in the entrance examination and joined the Indian Mercantile Marine Training Ship (IMMTS) Dufferin. After two years, he topped the class in the examination for entry into the Navy. He was one of the two cadets who were successful and joined the Royal Indian Navy - the other being Jal Cursetji.

== Naval career ==
Krishnan embarked for the United Kingdom and joined the monitor HMS Erebus. Subsequently, he trained on board the Hawkins-class cruiser HMS Vindictive. In late 1938, after the end of his training, he was promoted to the rank of midshipman and posted to HMS Foxhound, a part of the 8th Destroyer Flotilla.

=== World War II ===
In 1939, Krishnan was serving on the Foxhound during the outbreak of World War II. In late 1939, he was transferred to the County-class cruiser HMS Suffolk, which was a part of the Northern Patrol. He served on board the Suffolk when she participated in the Norwegian Campaign. In April 1940, the ship arrived at Tórshavn to commence the British pre-emptive occupation of the Faroe Islands and she sank the German tanker Skagerrak northwest of Bodø, Norway. Later in the month, Suffolk and four destroyers, HMS Kipling, HMS Juno, HMS Janus and HMS Hereward, were sent to bombard the airfield at Sola, Norway. The operation had little effect and the retaliation from German bombers severely damaged the aft of the ship, forcing her to return to Scapa Flow. He was subsequently transferred to the Renown-class battlecruiser HMS Repulse.

Krishnan was promoted to the rank of Acting Sub-Lieutenant in the Royal Indian Navy on 1 September 1940 and underwent training at Portsmouth. He served in the United Kingdom during the Battle of Britain. On 20 January 1941, he joined the survey ship HMIS Investigator. The ship left Bombay and was assigned patrolling duty off the coast of Iraq. At Basra, he was given command of a tugboat which acted as a tender to the Grimsby-class sloop HMAS Yarra (U77).

In August 1941, Britain and the Soviet Union invaded Iran, with the sloop HMS Falmouth in charge of the landings at Khorramshahr, carrying two companies of the 3/10th Baluch Regiment. She was accompanied by the Yarra and the Investigator. During this mission, Krishnan's tug was to standby and assist if necessary. The jetty had four gunboats, one of which started firing at the tug. Krishnan brought his ship alongside the gunboat and boarded it. The ship was captured after a brief firefight. Twenty prisoners were captured and three were killed. Khorramshahr was captured and the Iranian sloop Babr sunk and two Iranian gunboats captured.

For this action, Krishnan was awarded the Distinguished Service Cross (DSC). He was the first recipient of the award in the Royal Indian Navy. The citation for the DSC reads as follows:

CITATION

Sub-Lieutenant Nilakanta Krishnan

Royal Indian Navy, HMIS Investigator

In the first list of awards of bravery made to the Royal Indian Navy, the Distinguished Service Cross is awarded to Sub-Lieutenant N. Krishnan for dash and daring in the capture of a ship at the beginning of the Iranian operations last August. Sub-Lieutenant N. Krishnan, R.I.N. (HMIS Investigator) led a boarding party to capture an enemy ship, the crew of which offered stout resistance. Krishnan himself was engaged in a personal duel with the Captain of the enemy ship and proved himself to be the better shot. After killing him and seriously wounding two officers and four men, he captured the ship undamaged with twenty prisoners.

Krishnan was promoted to the rank of lieutenant on 16 August 1941. In early 1942, he was given command of the gunboat he had captured and designated senior officer of the fleet of three gunboats consisting of the Simorgh, Shahbaz and Shahrokh. The flotilla was to report at Bombay en route Karachi. Later that year, he took command of the Basset-class trawler HMIS Baroda.

In late 1942, Krishnan was posted as an instructor at HMIS Bahadur, the Boys' training establishment at Karachi. After a short stint of about six months, he was selected to undergo the navigation course at HMS Dryad. While undergoing the course, he was awarded his DSC in a ceremony at the Buckingham Palace. He received the award from Queen Elizabeth The Queen Mother. Wing Commander Guy Gibson received his Distinguished Service Order and Lieutenant Syed Mohammad Ahsan received his DSC in the same ceremony.

In December, after his return from the United Kingdom, he was posted to the Emerald-class cruiser HMS Emerald, which was a part of the Eastern Fleet. Shortly after that, he was transferred to the Crown Colony-class cruiser HMS Ceylon. In June 1943, he was posted as an instructor at HMIS Feroze in Bombay.

=== Post-Independence ===
During the partition of India, Krishnan was posted to HMIS Himalaya in Karachi as the officer in charge Chamak, the radar school. After a short stint, he returned to India and given command of the Motor Launch ML 420 as an escort to two Landing Ship, Tanks (LST). The LSTs were to be part of a naval force consisting of three sloops - HMIS Kistna, HMIS Cauvery and HMIS Jumna, two fleet minesweepers - HMIS Konkan and HMIS Madras which participated in the Annexation of Junagarh. The naval force was commanded by Commander Ram Dass Katari, who later became the first Indian chief of the naval staff (CNS). After establishing a communication centre at Porbandar, Krishnan was appointed naval liaison officer to the commander of the Kathiawar Defence Force (KDF), Brigadier Gurdial Singh.

In late 1947, Krishnan was promoted to the acting rank of lieutenant commander and appointed senior officer reserve fleet (SORF). The fleet consisted of multiple wartime ships which were now put in reserve and was now based at Trombay. A few months later, he was handpicked by the chief of staff to the Commander-in-Chief, Royal Indian Navy Commodore Martin Henry St. Leger Nott to join the Plans and Intelligence directorate at Naval HQ. He joined the directorate, headed by Commander Adhar Kumar Chatterji, as staff officer (plans). He was promoted to substantive lieutenant commander on 16 August 1949. Subsequently, he replaced Chatterji as the director of naval plans and intelligence at Naval HQ. Krishnan, as director of naval plans and intelligence, was part of the joint planning committee (JPC) consisting of directors of plans of the three services. Lieutenant Colonel Sam Manekshaw, director of military operations (DMO) at Army HQ and Wing Commander Pratap Chandra Lal, director of policy and plans at Air HQ, were also a part of the JPC.

On 19 December 1949 he was promoted to the acting rank of commander. He was selected to attend the Joint Services Staff College at Latimer, Buckinghamshire. After the six-month course, he was appointed Deputy Naval Advisor to the High Commissioner of India to the United Kingdom V. K. Krishna Menon at India House, London. During this stint, he underwent a two-month attachment with the Town-class cruiser HMS Sheffield. In 1951, Krishnan returned to India was appointed Commander of the 31st Minesweeping Squadron. After a short stint, he was given command of the training ship INS Tir. Lieutenant Commander S. H. Sarma was his executive officer. In 1952, to commemorate the Coronation of Elizabeth II, a massive Coronation review of the fleet was held at Portsmouth. The flagship INS Delhi, destroyer INS Ranjit and INS Tir represented India at the review. A naval armada consisting of ships from the Indian Navy, Royal Navy, Royal Australian Navy and the Royal New Zealand Navy sailed from Portsmouth to Gibraltar. The fleet carried out exercises along the way and was under the command of Lord Mountbatten. Subsequently, the Indian ships continued conducting exercises with the Mediterranean Fleet. They sailed from Gibraltar to Malta, the Greek islands and to Istanbul.

Krishnan was promoted to substantive commander on 30 June 1952. On 15 July 1955, Krishnan was appointed Director of Personnel Services at Naval HQ, with the acting rank of Captain. He was appointed deputy secretary (military wing) in the Cabinet Secretariat on 9 January 1956. He was the first naval officer to serve in this appointment. He was promoted to the substantive rank of captain on 31 December 1957. On 18 March 1958, he was promoted to commodore 2nd class while still serving as deputy secretary in the Cabinet Secretariat.

On 23 December 1958, Krishnan reverted to his permanent rank of captain and took over as the commanding officer of the Leander-class cruiser INS Delhi. He was in command of the Delhi for two-and-a-half years. In June 1959, he led the Delhi which was part of the Indian fleet which embarked on a ten-week exercise. The flagship Mysore was escorted by the Kaveri and Kistna. The 14th frigate squadron comprising INS Brahmaputra and INS Khukri and the 11th destroyer squadron comprising INS Rajput, INS Ranjit and INS Rana also joined them. The ships called on ports on the east coast of India and the Andaman Islands. In March 1960, the Delhi, under Krishnan was part of the fleet in the Joint Commonwealth exercises which was the largest till then, with the Royal Navy, Royal Australian Navy, Royal Ceylon Navy, Pakistan Navy, Royal New Zealand Navy and Royal Malaysian Navy participating. Under him, the ship also called on Penang and spent five days on a goodwill mission.

In June 1961, Krishnan was appointed commanding officer of the Navy's Engineering College INS Shivaji in Lonavala. Shortly thereafter, in December, he was asked by the chief of the naval staff, Vice Admiral Ram Dass Katari, to take command of the Delhi immediately and prepare her to put to sea in two weeks. The ship was to participate in the Annexation of Goa providing distant support to the Indian Army units storming Diu. On 11 December, he positioned the ship close to the coast and fired a barrage on the Diu Fortress. She also sunk four ships off the harbour and sent a landing party to the citadel of the fortress and hoist the Indian Flag. After the annexation, he returned to INS Shivaji and was in command for a year.

On 16 April 1963, Krishnan was appointed the second commanding officer of the aircraft carrier INS Vikrant, then the only aircraft carrier in Asia. While the carrier was in dry dock, he did a short operational stint on board Royal Navy's HMS Hermes, which later joined the Indian Navy as INS Viraat. He led the carrier in a commonwealth joint exercise off Singapore as well as on joint exercises with the Indian Army off the coast of Madras in August 1964. After an eighteen-month stint, he was selected to attend the Imperial Defence College in the United Kingdom. After completing the course, Krishnan was promoted to the rank of commodore on 1 January 1966. He was appointed Naval Advisor to the high commissioner of India to the United Kingdom Jivraj Narayan Mehta at India House, London. After a year as naval advisor, he took over as chief of naval aviation at Naval HQ on 17 January 1967. In May, the appointment was re-designated as assistant chief of naval staff (ACNS). In June, he was sent to Ghana as an advisor to the Ghana Navy in the aftermath of the 1966 coup d'état.

=== Flag rank ===
On 12 December 1967, Krishnan was appointed Vice Chief of the Naval Staff (VCNS) with the acting rank of rear admiral (paid from 18 February 1968). He was promoted to substantive rear admiral on 16 June 1968. During his tenure as VCNS, he was involved in the acquisition of Osa-class missile boats. On 26 March 1969, the post of VCNS was upgraded to the rank of vice admiral, with Krishnan being promoted to the acting rank from the same date.

On 26 January 1970, Krishnan was awarded the Param Vishisht Seva Medal for distinguished service of the most exceptional order. In February 1970, he was appointed Flag Officer Commanding-in-Chief (FOC-in-C) Western Naval Command and took over on 25 February. He was promoted to substantive Vice Admiral on 1 March 1970. On 1 March 1971, he moved to the helm of Eastern Naval Command as the FOC-in-C.

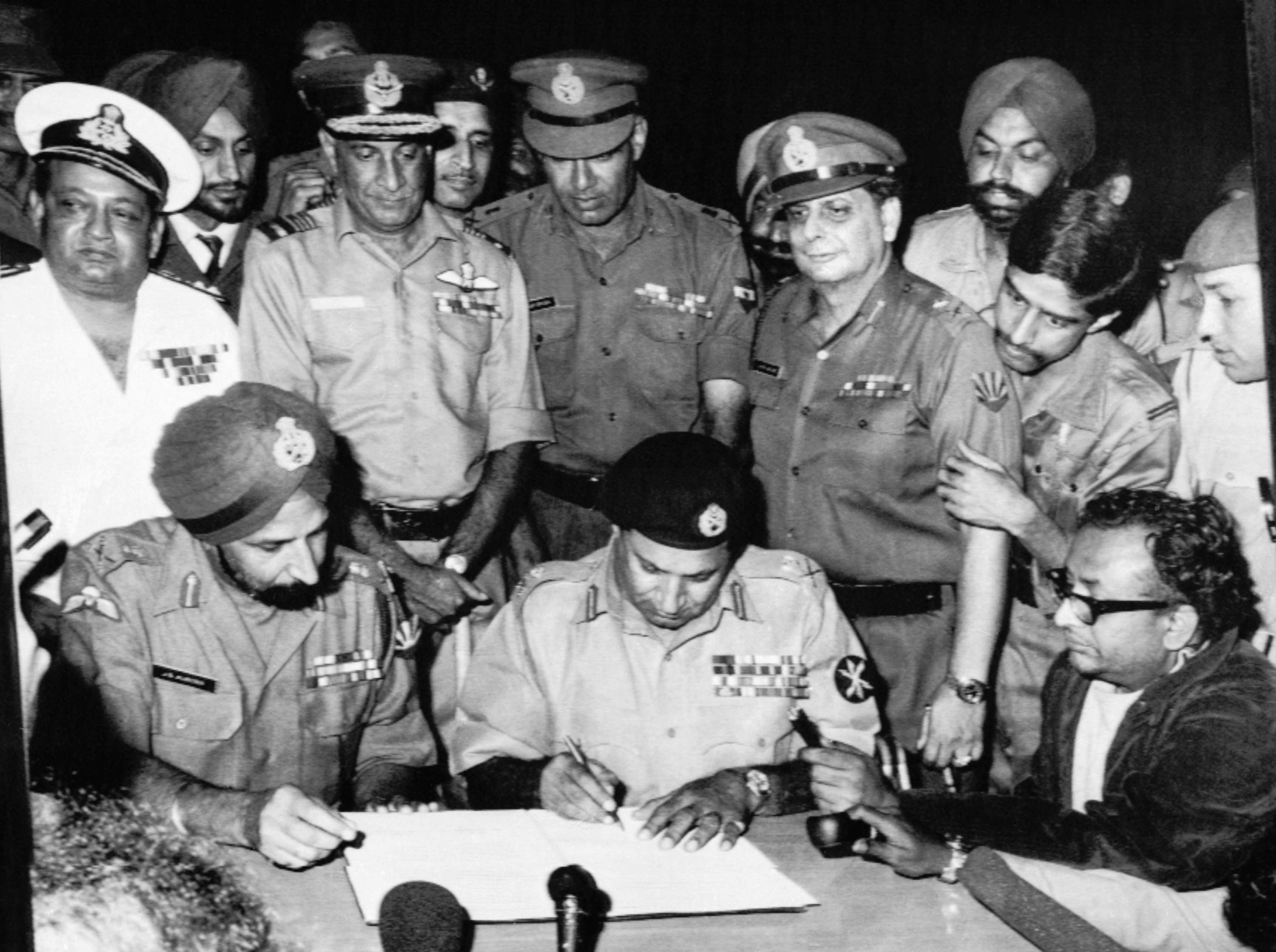
Lt Gen A A K Niazi signing the Instrument of Surrender under the gaze of Lt Gen J S Aurora. Standing immediately behind (L-R) Vice Admiral Krishnan, Air Marshal Dewan, Lt. Gen Sagat Singh and Maj Gen JFR Jacob.

=== Indo-Pakistani War of 1971 ===
His command in the eastern theatre during the 1971 war led the crew of the Aircraft Carrier INS Vikrant to earn two Mahavir Chakras and 12 Vir Chakras. Under his leadership in 1971, the aircraft carrier's Sea Hawks struck shipping in the Chittagong and Cox's Bazar harbours, sinking or incapacitating most ships in harbour. Krishnan was present during the signing of the Pakistani Instrument of Surrender at the Ramna Race Course. He also received the Naval surrender from the Flag Officer Commanding of the Eastern Naval Command of the Pakistan Navy, Rear Admiral Mohammad Shariff. Sharif surrendered his TT pistol to at 16:31 hrs saying "Admiral Krishnan, Sir, soon I will be disarmed. Your Navy fought magnificently and had us cornered everywhere. There is no one I would like to surrender my arms to other than the Commander-in-Chief of the Eastern Fleet." His TT Pistol is still placed in a covered glass display at the Indian Military Academy's Museum. For his leadership of the Eastern Naval Command, Krishnan was awarded the Padma Bhushan in January 1972.

=== Post-war career ===
Krishnan was to retire in 1973, but was given a two-year extension in service. In February 1973, he was appointed chairman and managing director (CMD) of Cochin Shipyard Limited. The two-year extension was given to enable Krishnan to be in the running for the post of Chief of the Naval Staff (CNS) when Admiral Sourendra Nath Kohli retired. In January 1976, the Government of India announced that Jal Cursetji would be the next CNS. Krishnan retired from the Indian Navy on 29 February 1976. In August 1977, when the system of Captain Commandants of the branches of the Navy was instituted, he was appointed the first Captain Commandant of the executive branch. He continued as the CMD of Cochin Shipyard Limited till 1979, when he retired.

== Personal life ==
Krishnan married Sita, his cousin and childhood sweetheart, on 15 December 1943. He referred to her as his consort battleship. The couple had two children - Chitra and Arjun. Chitra was an educator and author of children's books and died in 1987, aged 41. Arjun is an information technology professional based in the United States. He edited Krishnan's autobiography and released it in 2014.

== Post-retirement ==
After his retirement, Krishnan wrote a book on the Indo-Pakistani War of 1971 - No way But Surrender — An Account of the Indo-Pakistani War in the Bay of Bengal. He also wrote his autobiography titled A Sailor's Story, which was edited and released by his son Arjun.

Krishnan died in his sleep at Hyderabad on 30 January 1982.

== Awards and decorations ==

Padma Bhushan	Param Vishisht Seva Medal	General Service Medal 1947	Poorvi Star	Raksha Medal
Sangram Medal	Videsh Seva Medal	Indian Independence Medal		25th Independence Anniversary Medal
20 Years Long Service Medal		9 Years Long Service Medal	Distinguished Service Cross (DSC)	
1939–45 Star		Pacific Star	Defence Medal	
War Medal 1939–1945			Queen Elizabeth II Coronation Medal	

== Bibliography ==
- Krishnan, Arjun (2014), A Sailor's story, Punya Publications, ISBN 978-8189534141
- Collins, J. T. E. (1964). The Royal Indian Navy, 1939–1945. Official History of the Indian Armed Forces In the Second World War. New Delhi: Combined Inter-Services Historical Section (India & Pakistan) – via Hyperwar.
- Rohwer, Jürgen; Hümmelchen, Gerhard (1992). Chronology of the War at Sea 1939–1945. London: Greenhill Books. ISBN 1-85367-117-7.
- Gill, G. Hermon (1957). The Royal Australian Navy, 1939–1942. Australia in the War of 1939–1945: Series Two Navy. Canberra: Australian War Memorial.
- Nanda, S. M. (2004), The man who bombed Karachi, HarperCollins Publishers India, ISBN 978-8172235628
- Sarma, S. H. (2001), My years at sea, Lancer Publishers & Distributors, ISBN 978-8170621218
- Singh, Satyindra (1991), Blueprint to bluewater: The Indian Navy, 1951-65, Lancer International, ISBN 978-8170621485
- Hiranandani, G. M. (1999), Transition to Triumph: History of the Indian Navy, 1965-1975, Spantech & Lancer, ISBN 978-1897829721
- Singh, Satyindra (1986), Under Two Ensigns: The Indian Navy, 1945-1950, Oxford & IBH Pub. Co, ISBN 978-8120400948

Military offices
Preceded by P. S. Mahindroo	Commanding Officer INS Delhi; 1958–1961	Succeeded by V. N. Sonpar
Preceded by B. P. Sinha	Commanding Officer INS Shivaji; 1961–1963	Succeeded by P. S. Mahindroo
Preceded by P. S. Mahindroo	Commanding Officer INS Vikrant; 1963–1964	Succeeded by V. A. Kamath
Preceded by Sourendra Nath Kohli	Vice Chief of the Naval Staff; 1967–1970	Succeeded by Jal Cursetji
Preceded by Sardarilal Mathradas Nanda	Flag Officer Commanding-in-Chief Western Naval Command; 1970–1971	Succeeded by Sourendra Nath Kohli
Preceded by K. R. Nair	Flag Officer Commanding-in-Chief Eastern Naval Command; 1971–1973	Succeeded by K. L. Kulkarni
