= Jal Cursetji =

Indian Navy officier (1919–1991)

Admiral Jal Cursetji PVSM

8th Chief of the Naval Staff
- In office 1 March 1976 – 1 March 1979
- President: Fakhruddin Ali Ahmed; B. D. Jatti; Neelam Sanjiva Reddy
- Prime Minister: Indira Gandhi; Morarji Desai
- Preceded by: Sourendra Nath Kohli
- Succeeded by: Ronald Lynsdale Pereira

Personal details
- Born: 20 May 1919 Jabalpur, Jubbulpore Division, Central Provinces and Berar, British Raj (now Madhya Pradesh, India)
- Died: 29 January 1991 (aged 71) Bombay, Maharashtra, India (now Mumbai)
- Spouse: Navaz Dallas (m.1955)
- Children: 2
- Awards: Param Vishisht Seva Medal; Legion of Merit

Military service
- Allegiance: British India (1938–1947); India (1947–1979)
- Branch/service: Royal Indian Navy (1938–1947); Indian Navy (1947–1979)
- Years of service: 1938–1979
- Rank: Admiral
- Commands: Western Naval Command; INS Vikrant (1961); 11th Destroyer squadron INS Rajput (D141); INS Investigator; HMIS Bombay (J249)
- Battles/wars: World War II; Indo-Pakistani War of 1971

Admiral Jal Cursetji, PVSM (20 May 1919 – 29 January 1991) was a former Flag Officer in the Indian Navy. He served as the 8th Chief of the Naval Staff (CNS) from 1 March 1976 until 28 February 1979. He was the first hydrographer to serve as the CNS.

Born in a Parsi family in Jabalpur, Cursetji joined the Training Ship Dufferin in 1935, where his batchmate was Nilakanta Krishnan. After training on various ships of the Royal Navy, he served on the Aubrietia-class sloop HMIS Clive (L79) and the Bathurst-class corvette HMIS Bombay (J249). In 1944, he commanded HMIS Bombay. After specialising in hydrography in the United Kingdom, he was tasked with the planning of setting up a hydrographic office in India. He served as the Surveyor-in-Charge, Marine Survey of India and commanded the survey ship INS Investigator. He was the first Indian to serve as the Chief Hydrographer of the Navy, from 1955 to 1957.

Cursetji subsequently commanded the 11th destroyer squadron and the lead ship INS Rajput (D141) and served for about four years as the Naval attaché at the Embassy of India, Washington, D.C., from 1961 to 1965. Returning to India, he commanded the aircraft carrier INS Vikrant from 1966 to 1967. Promoted to flag rank in 1967, he took over as Chief of Personnel at Naval headquarters. In 1970, he was appointed the Vice Chief of the Naval Staff and served in this appointment during the Indo-Pakistani War of 1971.

Cursetji served as the Flag Officer Commanding-in-Chief Western Naval Command from 1973 to 1976, before taking over as the Chief of Naval Staff. During his tenure as the CNS, the maritime reconnaissance role was taken over by the Navy, the Indian Coast Guard came into being and the Goa Naval area was established. The Southern Naval Area was also upgraded into a full-fledged command. Cursetji was awarded the Param Vishisht Seva Medal in 1971 and was the first recipient from the Indian Navy of the Legion of Merit.

== Early life ==
Cursetji was born in 1919 in Jabalpur, Madhya Pradesh in a Parsi family. He attended the St. Aloysius Senior Secondary School in Jabalpur. In 1935, he was successful in the entrance examination and joined the Indian Mercantile Marine Training Ship (IMMTS) Dufferin. After two years, he took the examination for entry into the Navy. He was one of the two cadets who were successful and joined the Royal Navy – the other being Nilakanta Krishnan.

== Naval career ==
Cursetji embarked for the United Kingdom and joined the monitor HMS Erebus (I02). Subsequently he trained on board the Hawkins-class cruiser HMS Vindictive (1918). In late 1938, after the end of his training, he was promoted to the rank of midshipman and posted to HMS Foxhound (H69), a part of the 8th Destroyer Flotilla.

=== World War II ===
In 1939, Cursetji was serving on the Foxhound during the outbreak of World War II. In late 1939, he was transferred to the County-class cruiser HMS Suffolk (55), which was a part of the Northern Patrol. He served on board the Suffolk when she participated in the Norwegian Campaign. In April 1940, the ship arrived at Tórshavn to commence the British pre-emptive occupation of the Faroe Islands and she sank the German tanker Skagerrak northwest of Bodø, Norway. Later in the month, Suffolk and four destroyers, HMS Kipling (F91), HMS Juno (F46), HMS Janus (F53) and HMS Hereward (H93), were sent to bombard the airfield at Sola, Norway. The operation had little effect and the retaliation from German bombers severely damaged the aft of the ship, forcing her to return to Scapa Flow. He was subsequently transferred to the Renown-class battlecruiser HMS Repulse (1916).

Cursetji was commissioned as an acting sub-lieutenant in the RIN on 1 April 1940, with confirmation as a sub-lieutenant on 1 September 1940 (pre-dated from 1 April). He qualified as a Hydrography Specialist in the United Kingdom, and was promoted to lieutenant on 1 October 1941. He was transferred to the Aubrietia-class sloop HMIS Clive (L79). He subsequently served on the Bathurst-class corvette HMIS Bombay (J249). In early 1944, he took command of the Bombay.

=== Post-Independence ===
After the independence of India, Cursetji opted to join the Indian Navy. He was the senior most Indian officer in the Hydrographic Survey branch, and took part in the coastal surveys of Burma, Malaya and Indonesia. In April 1949, then an acting Commander, he was sent to the United Kingdom to prepare a report on establishing a Hydrographic office in India. After spending about a year, he returned in early 1950 and submitted his report to Naval HQ. The Marine Survey of India (MSI) was established in 1874 in Calcutta and was responsible for the hydrographic surveys. It was headed by the Surveyor-in-Charge.

In 1950, Cursetji took over as the Surveyor-in-Charge of the Marine Survey of India. He headed the MSI for about three years, till 1953. After relinquishing charge, he took command of the survey ship INS Investigator. On 1 Jun 1954, MSI was relocated to Dehradun, its present location, and was renamed Naval Hydrographic Office. The appointment of Surveyor-in-Charge Marine Survey of India was re-designated Chief Hydrographer of the Navy. On 15 November 1955, he was promoted to acting rank of captain and appointed the Chief Hydrographer of the Navy. He was the second incumbent and the first Indian to hold the appointment. This appointment was later re-designated Chief Hydrographer to the Government of India in 1964. Cursetji served as the Chief Hydrographer till November 1957.

On 5 November 1957, Cursetji was appointed Captain (D) 11th Destroyer Squadron as well as the Commanding Officer of the lead destroyer of the squadron, INS Rajput (D141). Apart from the Rajput, the flotilla consisted of INS Ranjit (1949) and INS Rana (1942). Later that year, on 31 December, he was promoted to the substantive rank of captain. In 1961, Cursetji was appointed the first Naval attaché at the Embassy of India, Washington, D.C. The Ambassador of India to the United States during his tenure was Braj Kumar Nehru. He simultaneously held the office of Naval adviser to the High Commissioner of India to Canada in Ottawa. He spent about four years in this appointment, till 1965. After returning to India, he was appointed CAPBRAX (captain naval barracks) and Commanding Officer of INS Angre. After a short stint, Cursetji was appointed the fourth commanding officer of the flagship of the Indian Navy – INS Vikrant, then the only aircraft carrier in Asia. He took over from Captain V. A. Kamath on 4 November 1966. In mid-1967, he led the ship in large air-sea exercises in the Arabian Sea which was witnessed by the Prime Minister, Indira Gandhi.

=== Flag rank ===
On 8 December 1967, he relinquished command of the Vikrant, handing over to Captain E. C. Kuruvila. Cursetji was promoted to the acting rank of rear admiral and took over as the Chief of Personnel (COP) at Naval Headquarters. Taking over from Rear Admiral K. R. Nair, he served as COP for little over two years. In early 1970, Cursetji was appointed the third Vice Chief of the Naval Staff. He was promoted to the acting rank of vice admiral and took over from his batchmate Vice Admiral Nilakanta Krishnan on 20 February 1970. On 26 January 1971, he was awarded the Param Vishisht Seva Medal for distinguished service of the highest order. He served as the VCNS during the Indo-Pakistani War of 1971. In August 1972, he led a delegation to the Soviet Union to negotiate the acquisition of ship and aircraft. The Maritime reconnaissance aircraft Ilyushin Il-38 was acquired.

On 27 February 1973, with Admiral Sourendra Nath Kohli taking over as the Chief of the Naval Staff, Cursetji took command of the Western Naval Command. He was promoted to the substantive rank of vice admiral on 1 March that year.

=== Chief of Naval Staff ===
In January 1976, the Government of India announced that Cursetji would be the next Chief of the Naval Staff. He took over from Admiral Sourendra Nath Kohli on 1 March 1976. Soon after taking over as Chief, Cursetji and the Chief of the Air Staff Air Chief Marshal Hrushikesh Moolgavkar discussed about the handing over of the maritime reconnaissance role from the Indian Air Force to the Indian Navy. In accordance with this, the Lockheed L-1049 Super Constellation aircraft of the No. 6 Squadron IAF were transferred to the Navy. On 8 October 1976, Cursetji commissioned INAS 312 at Goa. With the increase in the Indian Naval Air Arm in Goa, in 1977, the Goa Naval area was upgraded and the Naval Officer in Charge Goa (NOIC GOA) was re-designated as Flag Officer Commanding Goa Area (FOGA), a two star appointment. The Southern Naval Area was also upgraded to a full command, under the Flag Officer Commanding-in-Chief Southern Naval Command.

Under Cursetji's tenure, on 19 August 1978, the Indian Coast Guard (ICG) came into being. The new service was to function under the overall command and control of a Director General (DGICG). Vice Admiral V. A. Kamath was selected as the founding Director General of the Indian Coast Guard. In October 1978, he was awarded the Legion of Merit by the United States Department of the Navy during his visit to the United States. He was the first recipient of the award. Later that year, he laid down the keel of the first indigenously designed frigate INS Godavari (F20).

After a full three-year tenure, Cursetji retired on 28 February 1979.

== Personal life and legacy ==
Cursetji married Navaz Dallas in 1955. The couple had two daughters – Meher Cursetji Rafaat and Rashida Cursetji Mendu. He died in Mumbai in January 1991.

The Admiral Jal Cursetji rolling trophy, awarded to the best survey ship is named for him. The Western Naval Command held a talk to observe the birth centenary of Cursetji in 2019.

St. Aloysius Senior Secondary School, his Alma mater presents a rolling trophy named after him to the best athlete of the senior division.

== Dates of rank ==
Insignia	Rank	Component	Date of rank
	Sub-lieutenant	Royal Indian Navy	1 April 1940
	Lieutenant	Royal Indian Navy	1 October 1941
	Lieutenant-Commander	Royal Indian Navy	1 October 1949 (substantive)
	Lieutenant Commander	Indian Navy	26 January 1950 (recommissioning and change in insginia)
	Commander	Indian Navy	30 June 1952.
	Captain	Indian Navy	15 November 1955 (acting); 31 December 1957 (substantive)
	Rear Admiral	Indian Navy	18 December 1967 (acting; paid from 1 March 1968); 22 November 1969 (substantive)
	Vice-Admiral	Indian Navy	20 February 1970 (acting); 1 March 1973 (substantive)
	Admiral	Indian Navy (CNS)	1 March 1976

== See also ==
- Indian Naval Hydrographic Department

== Bibliography ==
- Abidi, S Sartaj Alam; Sharma, Satinder (2007), Services Chiefs of India, Northern Book Centre, ISBN 978-8172111625
- Krishnan, Arjun (2014), A Sailor's story, Punya Publications, ISBN 978-8189534141
- Singh, Satyindra (1986), Under Two Ensigns: The Indian Navy, 1945-1950, Oxford & IBH Pub. Co, ISBN 978-8120400948
- Hiranandani, G.M. (1999), Transition to Triumph: History of the Indian Navy, 1965-1975, Spantech & Lancer, ISBN 978-1897829721
- Hiranandani, G M (2005), Transition to eminence : the Indian navy 1976-1990, Lancer Publishers, ISBN 978-8170622666

Military offices
Preceded by V. A. Kamath	Commanding Officer INS Vikrant; 1966–1967	Succeeded by Elenjikal Chandy Kuruvila
Preceded by K. R. Nair	Chief of Personnel; 1967–1970	Succeeded by Elenjikal Chandy Kuruvila
Preceded by Nilakanta Krishnan	Vice Chief of the Naval Staff; 1970–1973	Succeeded by V. A. Kamath
Preceded by Sourendra Nath Kohli	Flag Officer Commanding-in-Chief Western Naval Command; 1973–1976	Succeeded by Ronald Lynsdale Pereira
Preceded by Sourendra Nath Kohli	Chief of the Naval Staff; 1976–1979	Succeeded by Ronald Lynsdale Pereira
