= K. L. Kulkarni =

Indian Navy admiral

Vice Admiral K. L. Kulkarni PVSM
- Born: 19 October 1921
- Died: 24 March 1991 (aged 69); Ganeshpur, Belgaum, Karnataka
- Military career
- Allegiance: British Raj; India
- Branch: Royal Indian Navy; Indian Navy
- Service years: 1940–1976
- Rank: Vice Admiral
- Commands: Eastern Naval Command; Chief of Material; Assistant Chief of the Naval Staff; Naval Officer-in-Charge, Goa; 15th Frigate Squadron; INS Rana; INS Rajput; INS Trishul
- Conflicts: World War II; Indo-Pakistani War of 1971
- Awards: Param Vishisht Seva Medal

Vice Admiral Kamalakar Laxman Kulkarni PVSM (19 October 1921 – 24 March 1991) was an Indian Navy admiral.

== Career ==
=== Early career ===
Kulkarni was commissioned a midshipman in the Royal Indian Navy on 1 September 1940. As a gunnery officer on HMS Glasgow, he was involved in a friendly fire incident on 7 December 1941 in which Glasgow sank the patrol vessel HMIS Prabhavati, having mistaken it for a submarine. He was promoted acting sub-lieutenant on 1 May 1942, having undergone gunnery and navigation courses at Portsmouth. He was assigned to the minesweeper HMIS Carnatic on 19 October 1942, and was promoted lieutenant on 1 July 1943. On 22 July, he was posted to the sloop HMIS Hindustan.

=== Post-Independence ===
Kulkarni was promoted acting lieutenant-commander on 31 December 1948, and to substantive lieutenant-commander on 1 July 1951. Specialising in radar and advanced navigation, he qualified in various advanced courses in the United Kingdom, along with the National Defence College course. On 15 February 1955, he was promoted acting commander and appointed Executive Officer I.N. Barracks, Bombay, with promotion to the substantive rank on 31 December. He successively commanded the frigate INS Trishul and the destroyers Rajput and Rana. Promoted captain, he commanded the 15th Frigate Squadron from 1961 to 1963. He then served as Director National Cadet Corps for Gujarat for a year, and was appointed Naval Officer-in-Charge, Goa in 1964. He was promoted commodore and appointed Assistant Chief of the Naval Staff in 1967.

=== Flag rank ===
On 23 December 1968, Kulkarni was promoted acting rear admiral and appointed Chief of Material. Kulkarni was promoted substantive rear admiral on 22 May 1971. In March 1973, he was promoted acting Vice admiral and appointed Flag Officer Commanding-in-Chief Eastern Naval Command. The appointment was subsequently upgraded, and Kulkarni was promoted substantive vice-admiral on 27 October 1973. He retired in April 1976.

Military offices
Preceded by Nilakanta Krishnan	Flag Officer Commanding-in-Chief Eastern Naval Command; 1973–1976	Succeeded by Swaraj Parkash
Preceded by V. A. Kamath	Chief of Material; 1968–1973	Succeeded by Rajendra Tandon
