= INS Vikrant (1961) =

Majestic-class aircraft carrier of the Indian Navy

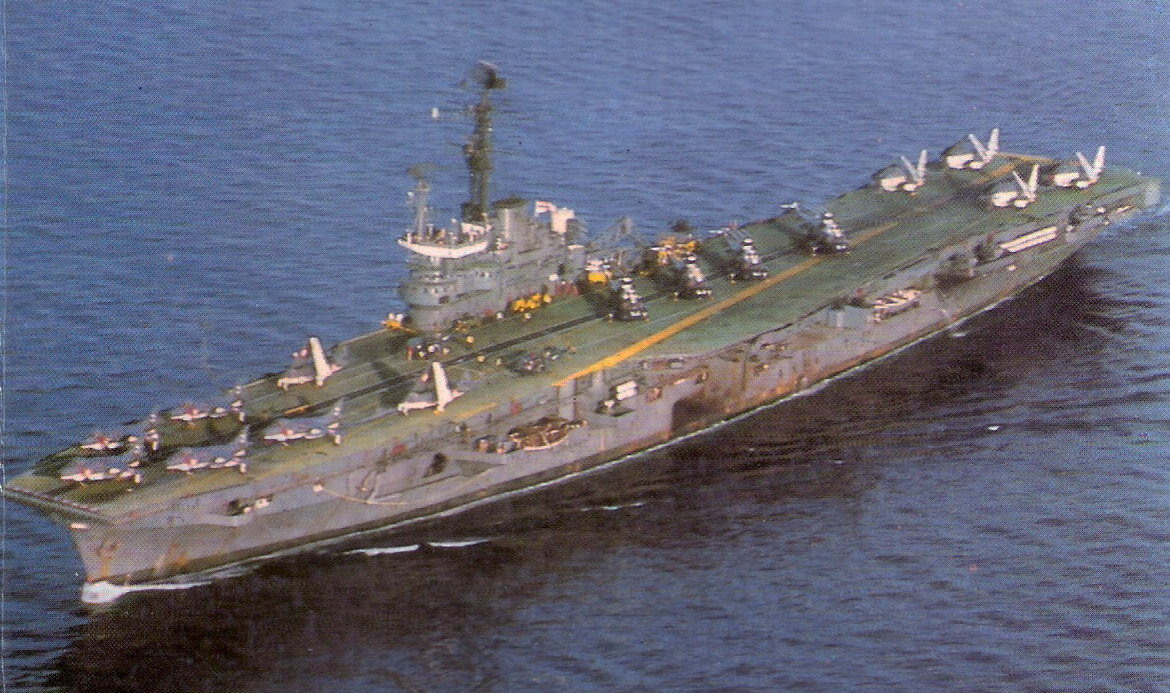
- INS Vikrant in 1984

History

United Kingdom
- Name: Hercules
- Builder: Vickers-Armstrongs; Harland & Wolff
- Laid down: 14 October 1943
- Launched: 22 September 1945
- Commissioned: Never commissioned
- Identification: Pennant number: R49
- Fate: Laid up, 1947; Sold to India, 1957

India
- Name: Vikrant
- Acquired: 1957
- Commissioned: 4 March 1961
- Decommissioned: 31 January 1997
- Home port: Bombay
- Identification: Pennant number: R11
- Motto: Sanskrit: Jayema Sam Yudhi Sprdhah; English: I completely defeat those who dare to fight with me
- Fate: Scrapped, 2014

General characteristics
- Class & type: Majestic-class light carrier
- Displacement: 16,000 t (15,750 long tons) (standard); 19,500 t (19,200 long tons) (deep load)
- Length: 700 ft (210 m) (o/a)
- Beam: 128 ft (39 m)
- Draught: 24 ft (7.3 m)
- Installed power: 40,000 ihp (30,000 kW); 4 Admiralty three-drum boilers
- Propulsion: 2 shafts; 2 Parsons geared steam turbines
- Speed: 25 knots (46 km/h; 29 mph)
- Range: 12,000 nmi (22,000 km; 14,000 mi) at 14 knots (26 km/h; 16 mph); 6,200 nmi (11,500 km; 7,100 mi) at 23 knots (43 km/h; 26 mph)
- Complement: 1,110
- Sensors & processing systems: 1 × LW-05 air-search radar; 1 × ZW-06 surface-search radar; 1 × LW-10 tactical radar; 1 × Type 963 aircraft-landing radar
- Armament: 16 × 40 mm Bofors anti-aircraft guns (later reduced to 8)
- Aircraft carried: 21–23
- Aviation facilities: 1961: Catapult Assisted Take-Off; 1989: 9.75 degree ski jump

INS Vikrant (from Sanskrit vikrānta, "courageous") was a Majestic-class aircraft carrier of the Indian Navy. The ship was laid down as HMS Hercules for the British Royal Navy during World War II, but was put on hold when the war ended. India purchased the incomplete carrier in 1957, and construction was completed in 1961. Vikrant was commissioned as the first aircraft carrier of the Indian Navy and played a key role in enforcing the naval blockade of East Pakistan during the Indo-Pakistani War of 1971.

In its later years, the ship underwent major refits to embark modern aircraft, before being decommissioned in January 1997. She was preserved as a museum ship in the Naval Docks in Mumbai until 2012. In January 2014, the ship was sold through an online auction and scrapped in November 2014 after final clearance from the Supreme Court.

== History and construction ==
In 1943 the Royal Navy commissioned six light aircraft carriers in an effort to counter the German and Japanese navies. The 1942 Design Light Fleet Carrier, commonly referred to as the British Light Fleet Carrier, was the result. Serving with eight navies between 1944 and 2001, these ships were designed and constructed by civilian shipyards as an intermediate step between the full-sized fleet aircraft carriers and the less expensive but limited-capability escort carriers. Sixteen light fleet carriers were ordered, and all of them were laid down as what became the Colossus class in 1942 and 1943. The final six ships were modified during construction to handle larger and faster aircraft, and were re-designated as the Majestic class. The improvements from the Colossus class to the Majestic class included heavier displacement, armament, catapult, aircraft lifts and aircraft capacity. Construction on the ships was suspended at the end of World War II, as the ships were more than the Royal Navy's peacetime requirements. Instead, the carriers were modernized and sold to several Commonwealth nations. The ships were similar, but each varied depending on the requirements of the country the ship was sold to.

HMS Hercules, the fifth ship in the Majestic class, was ordered on 7 August 1942 and laid down on 14 October 1943 by Vickers-Armstrongs at High Walker on the River Tyne. After World War II ended with Japan's surrender on 2 September 1945, she was launched on 22 September and her construction was suspended in May 1946. At the time of suspension, she was 75 per cent complete. Her hull was preserved, and in May 1947 she was laid up in Gareloch off the Clyde. In January 1957, she was purchased by India and was towed to Belfast to complete her construction and modifications by Harland & Wolff. Several improvements to the original design were ordered by the Indian Navy, including an angled deck, steam catapults and a modified island.

== Design and description ==
Vikrant displaced 16,000 t (15,750 long tons) at standard load and 19,500 t (19,200 long tons) at deep load. She had an overall length of 700 ft (210 m), a beam of 128 ft (39 m) and a mean deep draught of 24 ft (7.3 m). She was powered by a pair of Parsons geared steam turbines, driving two propeller shafts, using steam provided by four Admiralty three-drum boilers. The turbines produced a total of 40,000 indicated horsepower (30,000 kW) which gave a maximum speed of 25 knots (46 km/h; 29 mph). Vikrant carried about 3,175 t (3,125 long tons) of fuel oil that gave her a range of 12,000 nmi (22,000 km; 14,000 mi) at 14 knots (26 km/h; 16 mph); and 6,200 mi (10,000 km) at 23 knots (43 km/h; 26 mph). The air and ship crew consisted of 1,110 officers and men.

The ship was armed with sixteen 40-millimetre (1.6 in) Bofors anti-aircraft guns, but these were later reduced to eight. At various times, its aircraft consisted of Hawker Sea Hawk and BAe Sea Harrier jet fighters, Sea King Mk 42B and HAL Chetak helicopters, and Breguet Br.1050 Alizé anti-submarine aircraft. The carrier fielded between 21 and 23 aircraft of all types. Vikrant's flight decks were designed to handle aircraft weighing up to 24,000 lb (11,000 kg), but 20,000 lb (9,100 kg) remained the heaviest landing weight of an aircraft. Larger 54 by 34 feet (16.5 by 10.4 m) lifts were installed later. The ship was equipped with one LW-05 air-search radar, one ZW-06 surface-search radar, one LW-10 tactical radar and one Type 963 aircraft landing radar with other communication systems.

== Service ==
=== Early service ===
The Indian Navy's first aircraft carrier was commissioned as INS Vikrant on 4 March 1961 in Belfast by Vijaya Lakshmi Pandit, the Indian High Commissioner to the United Kingdom. The name Vikrant was derived from the Sanskrit word vikrānta meaning "stepping beyond", "courageous" or "bold". Captain Pritam Singh Mahindroo was the first commanding officer of the ship. Two squadrons were to be embarked on the ship - INAS 300 commanded by Lieutenant Commander B. R. Acharya which had British Hawker Sea Hawk fighter-bombers; and INAS 310 commanded by Lieutenant Commander Mihir K. Roy which had French Alizé anti-submarine aircraft. On 18 May 1961, the first Hawker Sea Hawk jet landed on her deck,followed by the first Alize on 23rd May. It was piloted by Lieutenant Radhakrishna Hariram Tahiliani, who later served as admiral and Chief of the Naval Staff of India from 1984 to 1987. Vikrant formally joined the Indian Navy's fleet in Bombay (now Mumbai) on 3 November 1961, when she was received at Ballard Pier by then Prime Minister Jawaharlal Nehru.

That December, the ship was deployed for Operation Vijay (the code name for the annexation of Goa) off the coast of Goa, with a contingent of 12 Sea Hawks. INS Vikrant was a part of the Carrier Task Group, including INS Delhi, INS Kuthar, INS Kirpan, INS Khukri, and INS Rajput. The carrier fleet did not see action during the conflict, only enforcing a maritime blockade in the Arabian sea to portuguese shipping. Vikrant did not see action and patrolled along the coast to deter foreign interference. The ship had conducted several maritime exercises off the coast of Kochi and Kutch until May 1965, when she was dry-docked to refit equipment. Consequently, she did not participate in the Indo-Pakistani War of 1965 the following September. She also made a brief deployment to the Andaman and Nicobar Islands following the conclusion of the war.

In June 1970, Vikrant was docked at the Naval Dockyard, Bombay, due to many internal fatigue cracks and fissures in the water drums of her boilers that could not be repaired by welding. As replacement drums were not available locally, four new ones were ordered from Britain, and Naval Headquarters issued orders to not use the boilers until further notice. On 26 February 1971 the ship was moved from Ballard Pier Extension to the anchorage without replacement drums. The main objective behind this move was to light up the boilers at reduced pressure, and work up the main and flight deck machinery that had been idle for almost seven months. On 1 March, the boilers were ignited, and basin trials up to 40 revolutions per minute (RPM) were conducted. Catapult trials were conducted on the same day.

The ship began preliminary sea trials on 18 March and returned two days later. Trials were again conducted on 26–27 April. The navy decided to limit the boilers to a pressure of 400 pounds per square inch (2,800 kPa) and the propeller revolutions to 120 RPM ahead and 80 RPM astern, reducing the ship's speed to 14 knots (26 km/h; 16 mph). With the growing expectations of a war with Pakistan in the near future, the navy started to transfer its ships to strategically advantageous locations in Indian waters. The primary concern of Naval Headquarters about the operation was the serviceability of Vikrant. When asked his opinion regarding the involvement of Vikrant in the war, Fleet Operations Officer Captain Gulab Mohanlal Hiranandani told the Chief of the Naval Staff Admiral Sardarilal Mathradas Nanda:

...during the 1965 war Vikrant was sitting in Bombay Harbour and did not go out to sea. If the same thing happened in 1971, Vikrant would be called a white elephant and naval aviation would be written off. Vikrant had to be seen being operational even if we didn't fly any aircraft.

— Captain Gulab Mohanlal Hiranandani,

Nanda and Hiranandani proved to be instrumental in taking Vikrant to war. There were objections that the ship might have severe operational difficulties that would expose the carrier to increased danger on operations. In addition, the three Daphne-class submarines acquired by the Pakistan Navy posed a significant risk to the carrier. In June, extensive deep sea trials were carried out, with steel safety harnesses around the three boilers still operational. (Note: The A1 boiler was completely blanked off due to serious problems.) Observation windows were fitted as a precautionary measure to detect any steam leaks. By the end of June, the trials were complete and Vikrant was cleared to participate on operations, with its speed restricted to 14 knots.

=== Indo-Pakistani War of 1971 ===
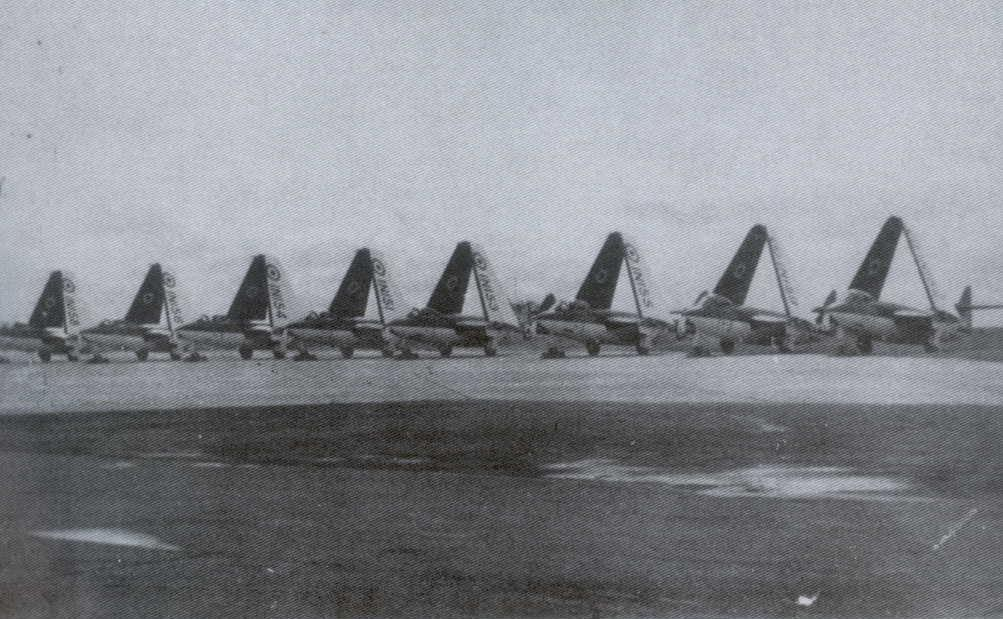
Vikrant's Sea Hawk squadron ashore during the December 1971 Indo-Pakistan war

As part of preparations for the war, Vikrant was assigned to Eastern Naval Command, then to the Eastern Fleet. This fleet consisted of INS Vikrant, the two Leopard-class frigates INS Brahmaputra and INS Beas, the two Petya III-class corvettes INS Kamorta and INS Kavaratti, and one submarine, INS Khanderi. The main reason behind strengthening the Eastern Fleet was to counter the Pakistani maritime forces deployed in support of military operations in East Bengal. The ship transitioned from Bombay to Cochin, and then onwards to Madras, where for the most part of September and October 1971, she conducted flight training for her aviators.

An area of 18,000 square miles (47,000 km^{2}), confined by a triangle with a base of 270 mi (430 km) and sides of 165 and 225 mi (266 and 362 km), was set up in the Bay of Bengal. Any ship in this area was to be challenged and checked. If found to be neutral, it would be escorted to the nearest Indian port, otherwise, it would be captured and taken as a war prize.

In the meantime, intelligence reports confirmed Pakistan was going to deploy the US-built Tench-class submarine PNS Ghazi. Ghazi was considered a serious threat to Vikrant by the Indian Navy, as Vikrant's approximate position would be known by the Pakistanis once she started operating aircraft. Of the four available surface ships, INS Kavaratti had no sonar, which meant the other three ships had to remain in close vicinity, around 5–10 mi (8.0–16.1 km) close to Vikrant, without which the carrier would be completely vulnerable to attacks by Ghazi.

On 23 July, Vikrant sailed off to Cochin in company with the Western Fleet. En route, before reaching Cochin on 26 July, Sea King landing trials were carried out. After completion of the radar and communication trials on 28 July, she departed for Madras, escorted by Brahmaputra and Beas. The next major problem was operating aircraft from the carrier. The commanding officer of the ship, Captain (later Vice Admiral) Swaraj Prakash, was seriously concerned about flight operations. He was concerned aircrew morale would be adversely affected if flight operations were not undertaken, which could be disastrous. Naval Headquarters remained stubborn on the speed restrictions, and sought confirmation from Prakash whether it was possible to embark a flight of Alizé without compromising the speed restrictions. The speed restrictions imposed by the headquarters meant Alizé aircraft would have to land at close to stalling speed. Eventually the aircraft weight was reduced, which allowed several of the aircraft to embark along with a Seahawk squadron.

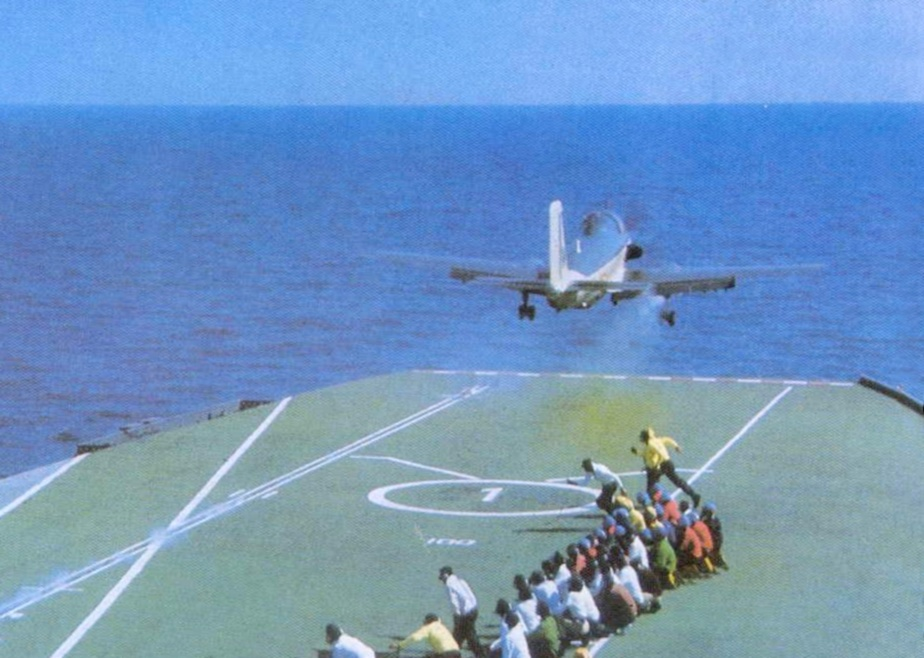
A Bréguet 1050 Alizé anti-submarine aircraft taking off from INS Vikrant

By the end of September, Vikrant and her escorts had reached Port Blair. En route to Visakhapatnam, tactical exercises were conducted in the presence of the Flag Officer Commanding-in-Chief of Eastern Naval Command. From Vishakhapatnam, Vikrant set out for Madras for maintenance. Rear Admiral S. H. Sarma was appointed Flag Officer Commanding Eastern Fleet and arrived at Vishakhapatnam on 14 October. After receiving reports that Pakistan might launch preemptive strikes, maintenance was stopped for another tactical exercise, which was completed during the night of 26–27 October at Vishakhapatnam. Vikrant then returned to Madras to resume maintenance. On 1 November, the Eastern Fleet was formally constituted, and on 13 November, the ships centred the new Vikrant Carrier Battle group set out for the Andaman and Nicobar Islands. To avoid misadventures, the plan was to sail Vikrant to a remote anchorage near Port Cornwallis codenamed Point X-ray, isolating it from combat. Simultaneously, deception signals would give the impression of Vikrant operating somewhere between Madras and Vishakhapatnam.Two Polnocny class LSTs, INS Guldhar and INS Gharial were repurposed as transports to supply fuel, ammunition and spare parts for the carrier's air wing and escorts. The SCI ship Deshdeep was chartered by the Navy to supply replenishments exclusively to the carrier under Operation Sangsar.

On 23 November, an emergency was declared in Pakistan after a clash of Indian and Pakistani troops in East Pakistan two days earlier. On 2 December, the Eastern Fleet proceeded to its patrol area in anticipation of an attack by Pakistan. The Pakistan Navy had deployed Ghazi on 14 November with the explicit goal of targeting and sinking Vikrant, and Ghazi reached a location near Madras by the 23rd. In an attempt to deceive the Pakistan Navy and Ghazi, India's Naval Headquarters deployed Rajput as a decoy—the ship sailed 160 mi (260 km) off the coast of Vishakhapatnam and broadcast a significant amount of radio traffic, making her appear to be Vikrant. Ghazi, meanwhile, sank off the Visakhapatnam coast under mysterious circumstances. On the night of 3–4 December, a muffled underwater explosion was detected by a coastal battery. The next morning, a local fisherman observed flotsam near the coast, causing Indian naval officials to suspect a vessel had sunk off the coast. The next day, a clearance diving team was sent to search the area, and they confirmed Ghazi had sunk in shallow waters.

The reason for Ghazi's fate is unclear. The Indian Navy's official historian G. M. Hiranandani suggests three possibilities after analysing the position of the rudder and extent of the damage suffered. The first was that Ghazi had come up to periscope depth to identify her position and may have seen an anti-submarine vessel that caused her to crash dive, which in turn may have led her to bury her bow in the bottom. The second possibility is closely related to the first: on the night of the explosion, Rajput was on patrol off Visakhapatnam and observed a severe disturbance in the water. Suspecting that it was a submarine, the ship dropped two depth charges on the spot, on a position that was very close to the wreckage. The third possibility is that there was a mishap when Ghazi was laying mines on the day before hostilities broke out.

Vikrant was redeployed towards Chittagong at the outbreak of hostilities. She left Point X-ray on 2 December in preparation of the hostilities. On 4 December, eight Sea Hawks took off from her deck at 8:00 AM and at a range of 230 nautical miles to strike shipping in the Chittagong and another eight were soon dispatched at a range of 85 nautical miles to strike Cox's Bazar harbours, sinking or incapacitating most of the ships present. Two gunboats were attacked with rockets, set on fire and presumably sunk, and six merchant ships at anchor or underway were strafed and immobilised. Strafing runs by the ship's aircrews also damaged two Greek cargo ships and the American merchant vessel Buckeye State on the 5th of December. Further strikes targeted Khulna and the Port of Mongla, which continued until 10 December, while other operations were flown to support a naval blockade of East Pakistan. Sea hawks also flew 24/7 Combat air patrol over the carrier.The Alizé also flew long range reconnaissance from the carrier. A strike by ten Seahawks and two Alizes was carried out on 06 December 1971 against Mongla, Chalna and Khulna that damaged the M/V Ondarda in the Pussur River. During a second airstrike later that day, three Seahawks proceeded to Dohazari and Hathazari and attacked the airfields located there. Subsequent strike by Seahawks ensured the destruction of army barracks and workshops around the Chittagong naval dockyard, and eliminated the Patanga coastal anti-shipping battery and damaged two other merchanman ships, the Mini Labor and Mini Tide. Alize aircrew constantly flew at night.

A submarine threat was misidentified on the 7th of December against the carrier, resulting in no missions being flow that day.On 10 December, Vikrant aircrews provided air support for amphibious landings by Indian army commandos west of Cox's bazaar. Later that day she was joined by Kavaratti, Gharial, Guldar, Desh Deep, Magar, and Rajput. Her escorts also intercepted and captured two Pakistani troopships carrying about 2000 soldiers as reinforcements from the Baluch light infantry regiment. Following Intelligence reports of the surviving enemy fleet making a dash for the sea, Rajput, Brahmaputra, Guldar and Gharial were directed to intercept all shipping east of the Meghna river. Sea Hawks flew recon missions over Barisal, Bakharganj and Patuakhali,sinking two tankers off Hatia and a gunboat in the Meghna river. On 12th December, 28 sorties were flown by Seahawks armed with 500-lb bombs and rockets against Cox's bazaar.Indian Navy ships Brahmaputra and Beas were tasked to carry out surface bombardment of Cox’s Bazar and also detached from the strike group. On 14 December, the Sea Hawks attacked the cantonment area in Chittagong, destroying several Pakistani army barracks. Medium anti-aircraft fire was encountered during this strike. Simultaneous attacks by Alizés continued on Cox's Bazar. Vikrant approached up to 60nmi from Chittagong for a final attack run, in coordination with the Indian Air Force. After this, Vikrant's fuel levels dropped to less than 25 per cent and the aircraft carrier sailed to Paradip for refueling on 15 December. Aircraft from Vikrant nevertless supported amphibious landings conducted by the other ships as a part of Operation Beaver on 14 and 15 December.

The Vikrant Carrier battle group sank 56,914 tonnes of shipping around East Pakistan. In addition, aircraft from the ship aided in the destruction of three gunboats, the PNS Shylet, PNS Jessore and PNS Comilla. A fourth PNS Rajshahi was also engaged but it managed to escaape to Burma prior to the end of war. Air strikes by Vikrants aircraft accounted for an additional 100,776 tonnes of Pakistani shipping sunk and destroyed,including both pre-planned and opportunity shipping targets at Cox's Bazaar, Chittagong, Khulna, Chalna, Mongla, Do Harisal, Barisal, Chiringa and Bakarganj as well as airfields, AA positions, oil fields, ammunition dumps, harbours and troop positions. The crew of Vikrant earned two Maha Vir Chakras and twelve Vir Chakra gallantry medals for their role in the war.

=== Later years ===
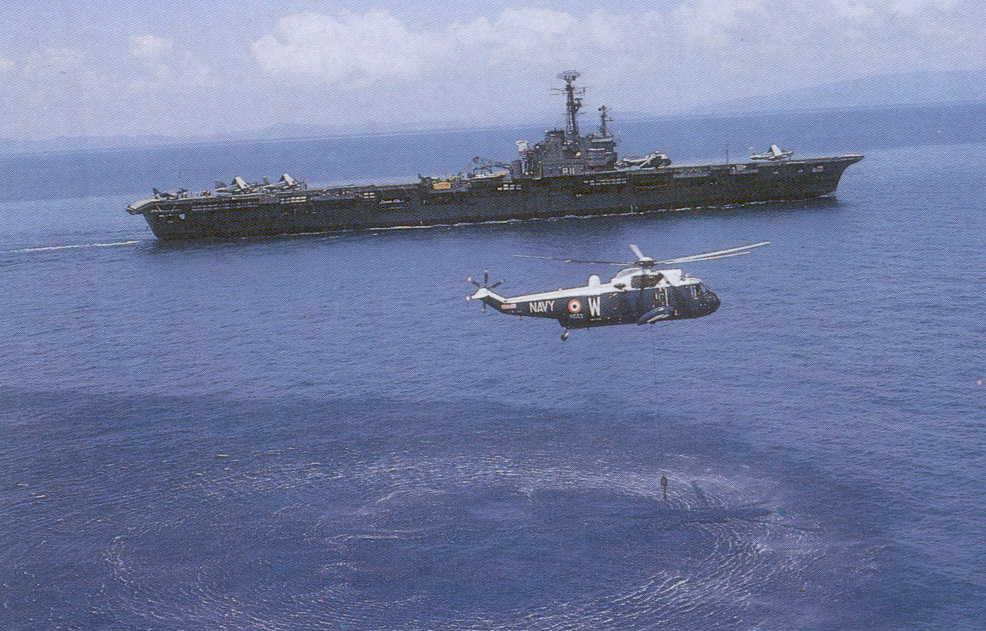
A Sea King helicopter acting as a plane guard with INS Vikrant

Vikrant did not see much service after the war, and was given two major modernisation refits—the first one from 1979 to 1981 and the second one from 1987 to 1989. These brief refits was to allow the Navy to both Retire the Sea Hawks and allow time to train pilots to operate BAE Sea Harriers from Vikrant, which was to allow the ship to stay in service until the late 80's or early 90's. In the first phase, her boilers, radars, communication systems and anti-aircraft guns were modernised, and facilities to operate Sea Harriers were installed. In the second phase, facilities to operate the new Sea Harrier Vertical/Short Take Off and Land (V/STOL) fighter aircraft and the new Sea King Mk 42B Anti-Submarine Warfare (ASW) helicopters were introduced. A 9.75-degree ski-jump ramp was fitted. The steam catapult was removed during this phase. in 1991, Vikrant again underwent a six-month refit, followed by another fourteen-month refit in 1992–94. She remained operational thereafter, flying Sea Harriers, Sea Kings and Chetaks until her final sea outing on 23 November 1994. In the same year, a fire was also recorded aboard. In January 1995, the navy decided to keep Vikrant in "safe to float" state. She was laid up and formally decommissioned on 31 January 1997.

=== Squadrons embarked ===
During her service, INS Vikrant embarked four squadrons of the Naval Air Arm of the Indian Navy:

Squadron	Name	Insignia	Aircraft	Notes
INAS 300	White Tigers		Hawker Sea Hawk	Operated during the 1971 war, and phased out in 1978.
INAS 300	White Tigers		BAE Sea Harrier	Introduced in 1983, with the first Harrier landing on the ship's deck on 20 December 1983, operated until the ship was decommissioned in late 1997.
INAS 310	Cobras		Breguet Alizé	Operated during the 1971 war, and phased out in 1987, with the last Alizé flown off on 2 April 1987.
INAS 321	Angels		Alouette III/ HAL Chetak (Note: French Alouette III light helicopters were produced in India under license by Hindustan Aircraft Limited (HAL) as "Chetaks".)	The Alouettes/Chetaks were first embarked in the 1960s, and operated until the ship was decommissioned in 1997.
INAS 330	Harpoons		Westland Sea King	Introduced into the Indian Navy in 1974, the Sea Kings operated on Vikrant from 1991, and remained until the ship was decommissioned in 1997.

== Commanding officers ==
S.No	Name	Assumed office	Left office	Notes
1	Captain P. S. Mahindroo	16 February 1961	16 April 1963	Commissioning CO. Later Chief of Materiel.
2	Captain Nilakanta Krishnan DSC	17 April 1963	16 November 1964	Flag Officer Commanding-in-Chief Eastern Naval Command during the Indo-Pakistani War of 1971.
3	Captain V. A. Kamath	16 November 1964	4 November 1966	Flag Officer Commanding Southern Naval Area during the Indo-Pakistani War of 1971. Founding Director General of Indian Coast Guard.
4	Captain Jal Cursetji	4 November 1966	8 December 1967	Later Chief of the Naval Staff.
5	Captain E. C. Kuruvila	8 December 1967	5 December 1969	Flag Officer Commanding Western Fleet during the Indo-Pakistani War of 1971. Later Flag Officer Commanding Southern Naval Area.
6	Captain Kirpal Singh	5 December 1969	15 January 1971	Later Flag Officer Commanding Western Fleet.
7	Captain S. L. Sethi NM	15 January 1971	30 June 1971	Later Vice Chief of the Naval Staff.
8	Captain Swaraj Parkash MVC, AVSM	1 July 1971	24 January 1973	Later Vice Chief of the Naval Staff and Director General of Indian Coast Guard.
9	Captain M. K. Roy AVSM	3 January 1974	8 February 1976	Later Flag Officer Commanding-in-Chief Eastern Naval Command.
10	Captain R. H. Tahiliani AVSM	8 February 1976	26 December 1977	Later Chief of the Naval Staff.
11	Captain J. C. Puri VrC, VSM	26 December 1977	5 March 1979	
12	Captain R. D. Dhir	5 March 1979	15 June 1979	
13	Captain S. Bose	15 June 1979	2 April 1981	
14	Captain Arindam Ghosh VSM	2 April 1981	27 August 1982	Later Fortress Commander, Andaman and Nicobar Islands.
15	Captain KASZ Raju NM	27 August 1982	19 November 1984	Later Flag Officer Commanding-in-Chief Western Naval Command.
16	Captain S. K. Gupta MVC, NM	19 November 1984	17 March 1986	
17	Captain P. A. Debrass AVSM, NM	17 March 1986	8 August 1988	Later Flag Officer Commanding Maharashtra Naval Area.
18	Captain B. S. Karpe	11 October 1988	22 October 1989	
19	Captain R. N. Ganesh AVSM, NM	22 October 1989	3 January 1991	Later Fortress Commander, Andaman and Nicobar Islands and Flag Officer Commanding-in-Chief Southern Naval Command.
20	Captain Raman Puri VSM	3 January 1991	25 June 1992	Later Chief of Integrated Defence Staff.
21	Captain R. C. Kochchar VSM	25 June 1992	7 September 1994	Later Flag Officer Commanding Maharashtra Naval Area.
22	Captain K. Mohanan	7 September 1994	7 August 1995	
23	Commander H. S. Rawat	20 July 1996	31 January 1997	Last Commanding Officer.

== Museum ship ==
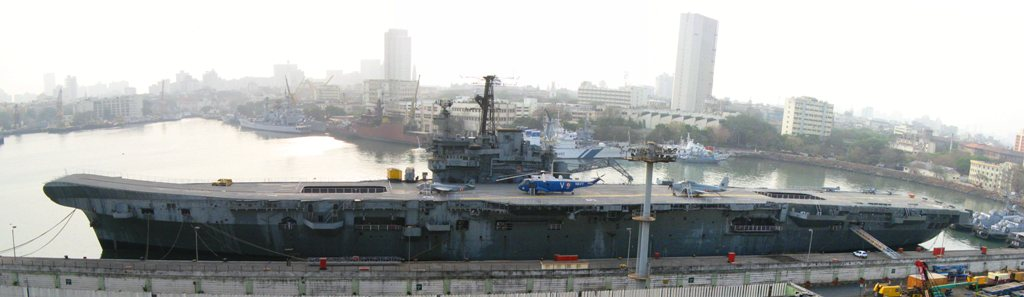
INS Vikrant preserved as a museum ship in Mumbai with aircraft visible on the flight deck

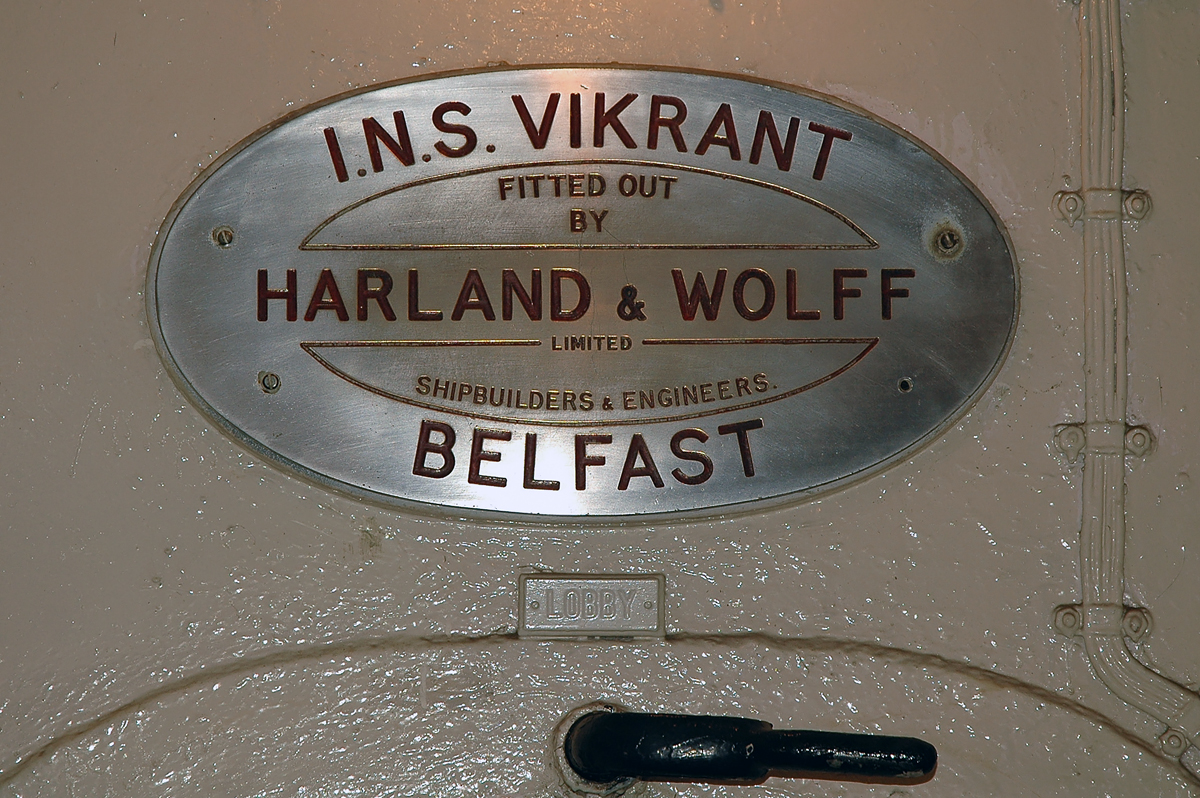
INS Vikrant builder's plate

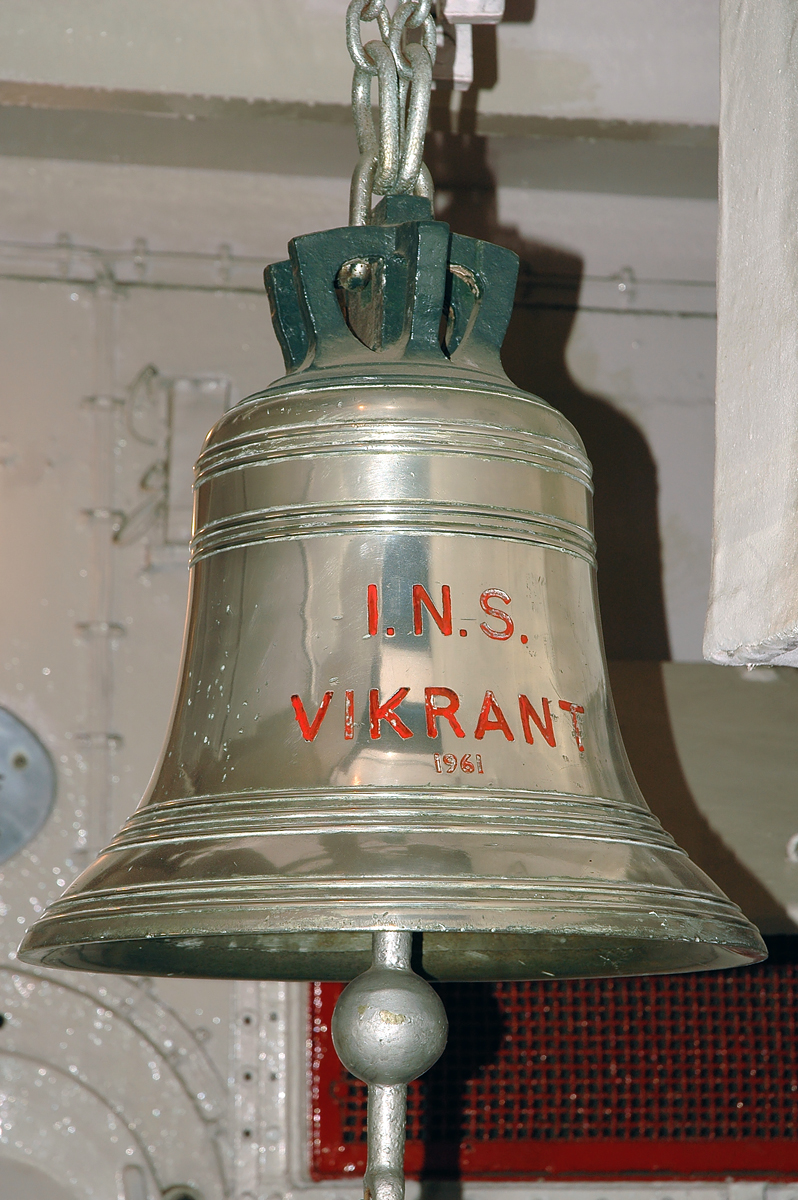
INS Vikrant ship's bell

Following decommissioning in 1997, Vikrant was earmarked for preservation as a museum ship in Mumbai. Lack of funding prevented progress on the ship's conversion to a museum and it was speculated Vikrant would be converted into a training ship. In 2001, the ship was opened to the public by the Indian Navy, but the Government of Maharashtra was unable to find a partner to operate the museum on a permanent, long-term basis and the museum was closed after it was deemed unsafe for the public in 2012.

== Scrapping ==
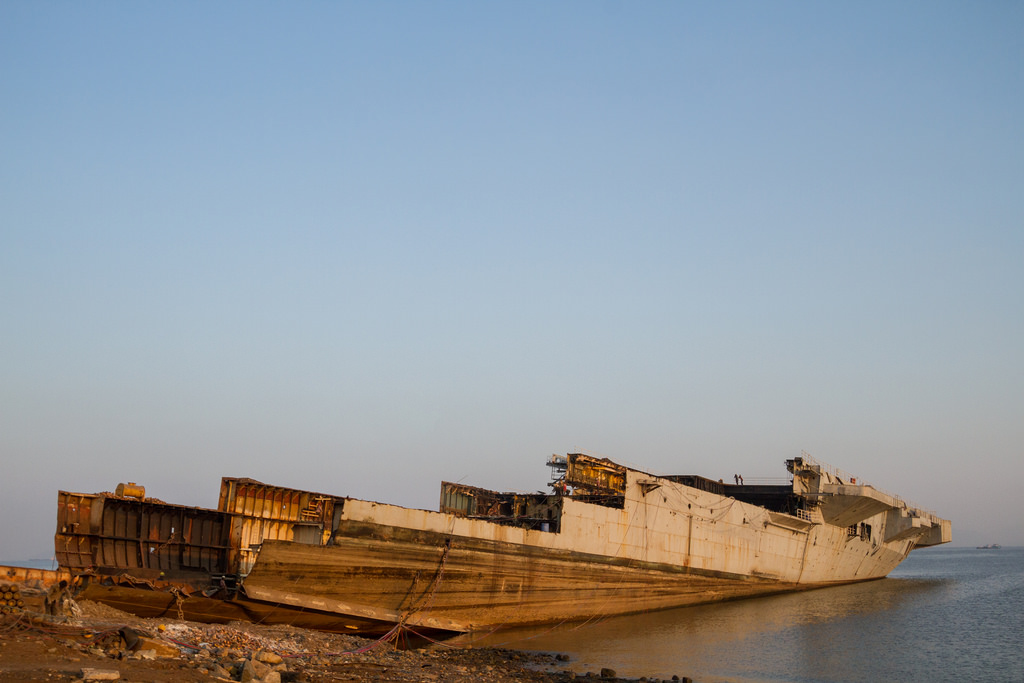
Vikrant being scrapped at Mumbai

In August 2013, Vice Admiral Shekhar Sinha, Commander-in-Chief of Western Naval Command, said the Ministry of Defence would scrap the ship as she had become very difficult to maintain and no private bidders had offered to fund the museum's operations. On 3 December 2013, the Indian government decided to auction the ship. The Bombay High Court dismissed a public-interest lawsuit filed by Kiran Paigankar to stop the auction, stating the vessel's dilapidated condition did not warrant her preservation, nor were the necessary funds or government support available. In January 2014, the ship was sold through an online auction to a Darukhana ship-breaker for ₹60 crore (US$6.2 million). The Supreme Court of India dismissed another lawsuit challenging the ship's sale and scrapping on 14 August 2014. Vikrant remained beached off Darukhana in Mumbai Port while awaiting the final clearances of the Mumbai Port Trust. On 12 November 2014, the Supreme Court gave its final approval for the carrier to be scrapped, which commenced on 22 November 2014.

On 7 April 2022, an FIR against an ex-MP Kirit Somaiya, his son Neil and others was registered, on charges of alleged cheating and criminal breach of trust linked to the collection of funds up to Rs. 57 crore for restoring the decommissioned aircraft carrier INS Vikrant. The Trombay Police booked them under Section 420 (cheating and dishonesty including delivery of property), Section 406 (punishment for criminal breach of trust) and Section 34 (common intentions) of the Indian Penal Code. According to the complaint, the father and son duo collected the money in 2013–14 in the name of restoring Vikrant, but the funds collected were spent on personal use. Somaiya was leading the front of attacking the government's intent of commercializing the decommissioned ship by handing it to private players.

== Legacy ==
In memory of Vikrant, the Vikrant Memorial was unveiled by Vice Admiral Surinder Pal Singh Cheema, Flag Officer Commanding-in-Chief of the Western Naval Command at K Subash Marg at the Naval Dockyard of Mumbai on 25 January 2016. The memorial is made from metal recovered from the ship. In February 2016, the Indian automobile manufacturer Bajaj unveiled a new motorbike made with metal from Vikrant's scrap and named it Bajaj V in honour of Vikrant.

The navy has named its first home-built carrier INS Vikrant in honour of INS Vikrant (R11). The new carrier is built by Cochin Shipyard Limited, and will displace 40,000 t (44,000 short tons). The keel was laid down in February 2009 and she was launched in August 2013 under the premiership of then PM Dr. Manmohan Singh. The ship was commissioned on 2 September 2022 by PM Narendra Modi.

== In popular culture ==
The decommissioned ship featured prominently in the film ABCD 2 as a backdrop while it was moored near Darukhana in Mumbai.

After the decommissioning of INS Vikrant, Mumbai-based artist Arzan Khambatta was approached by veterans who had served on the warship to create a sculpture in its memory. Using actual metal from the ship, Khambatta created a sculpture that now stands at Lion Gate, Mumbai.

== See also ==
- INS Vikrant (2013)
- INS Vikramaditya
- INS Viraat

== Bibliography ==
- Chant, Christopher (2014). A Compendium of Armaments and Military Hardware. Routledge. ISBN 978-1-134-64668-5.
- Hiranandani, Gulab Mohanlal (2000). Transition to Triumph: History of the Indian Navy, 1965–1975. Lancer Publishers. ISBN 978-1-897829-72-1.
- Hiranandani, Gulab Mohanlal (2009). Transition to Guardianship: The Indian Navy, 1991–2000. Lancer Publishers. ISBN 978-1-935501-66-4.
- Hobbs, David (2014). British Aircraft Carriers: Design, Development & Service Histories. Seaforth Publishing. ISBN 978-1-4738-5369-0.
- Konstam, Angus (2012). The Aviation History. Books on Demand. ISBN 978-3-8482-6639-5.
- Roy, Mihir K. (1995). War in the Indian Ocean. Lancer Publishers. ISBN 978-1-897829-11-0.
- Till, Geoffrey (2013). Seapower: A Guide for the Twenty-First Century. Routledge. ISBN 978-1-136-25555-7.
