= Sourendra Nath Kohli =

Indian Navy admiral

Admiral Sourendra Nath Kohli PVSM
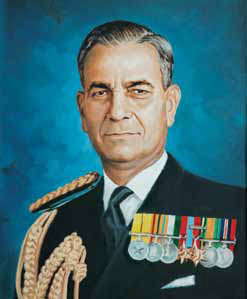

7th chief of the naval staff
- In office 1 March 1973 – 29 February 1976
- President: V. V. Giri; Fakhruddin Ali Ahmed
- Prime Minister: Indira Gandhi
- Preceded by: Sardarilal Mathradas Nanda
- Succeeded by: Jal Cursetji

Personal details
- Born: 21 June 1916 Amritsar, Punjab
- Died: 21 January 1997 (aged 80)
- Awards: Padma Bhushan; Param Vishist Seva Medal

Military service
- Allegiance: British India (till 1947); India (after 1947)
- Branch/service: Royal Indian Navy (till 1947); Indian Navy (after 1947)
- Years of service: 1936–1976
- Rank: Admiral
- Commands: Western Naval Command; Indian Fleet; INS Mysore (C60); INS Rana (D115)
- Battles/wars: World War II; Liberation of Goa; Indo-Pakistani War of 1965; Indo-Pakistani War of 1971
- Writing career
- Notable works: We dared Sea power and the Indian Ocean

Admiral Sourendra Nath Kohli, PVSM (21 June 1916 – 21 January 1997) was an Indian Navy admiral who served as the 7th chief of the naval staff from 1 March 1973 until 29 February 1976. Kohli served as the flag officer commanding-in-chief (FOC-IN-C) of the Western Naval Command during the Indo-Pakistan War of 1971 and successfully led Indian Navy's Western Fleet in Operation Trident and Operation Python against the Pakistan Navy fleet in Karachi. His prior commands include those as the commanding officer of INS Mysore (C60) and INS Rana (D115).

== Early life ==
Kohli was the son of B. L. Kohli, and studied for his BA (Hons.) at St. Stephen's College in Delhi.

== Naval career ==
=== Early career ===
Kohli joined the Royal Indian Navy Volunteer Reserve as a cadet in May 1936, immediately after his graduation. He was commissioned as a sub-lieutenant in the RIN on 25 June 1938, with promotion to lieutenant on 1 May 1941.

During World War II, Kohli served in the Persian Gulf and in the Far Eastern theatre. He qualified as a communication specialist in the United Kingdom in 1943. He served on board HMS Queen Elizabeth (1913) in 1944–45. He was promoted to acting lieutenant commander in 1946 and served at the then RIN Naval Headquarters, HMIS Dalhousie.

=== Post-Independence ===
After independence, Kohli opted to join the Indian Navy and was one of the key officers selected to oversee the expansion of the naval fleet. He was deputed to the United Kingdom in December 1948 in connection with acquisition of destroyers and was appointed commanding officer of INS Rana (D115) on her purchase from the Royal Navy in 1949, receiving promotion to acting commander (substantive lieutenant-commander) on 30 June of that year.

Other appointments that Kohli held included those as the senior officer of the flagship of the Indian Navy, INS Godavari (D92). Later, he also served as the commanding officer of the flagship, INS Mysore (C60). He was promoted to substantive commander on 30 June 1951, and was promoted to substantive captain on 30 June 1955.

Kohli served as the superintendent of the Naval Dockyard in Bombay. He also twice served as the director of naval plans. His staff appointments included those as chief of material and then as the vice chief of naval staff.

=== Flag rank ===
Kohli rose to flag rank in 1965 with promotion to substantive rear admiral on 18 August. He was the flag officer commanding of the fleet from 1967 to 1969. Kohli was awarded the Param Vishisht Seva Medal in January 1968. He was promoted to vice admiral on 14 February 1969. Next, Kohli served as the commandant of the National Defence College for two years until 1971.

On 12 February 1971, Kohli was appointed the flag officer commanding-in-chief (FOC-IN-C) of the Western Naval Command. During the war with Pakistan in December 1971, Kohli provided operational leadership for the devastating attacks on Karachi harbour. He also led the defence of Indian Naval facilities on the west coast. He was also responsible for overseeing the safety of the Indian mercantile fleet during the war. He was awarded the Padma Bhushan for his exceptional leadership during the 1971 war.

=== Chief of Naval Staff ===
On 1 March 1973, Kohli took over as the chief of the naval staff. He retired from the Navy on 29 February 1976.

== Later life ==
Kohli later served as governor of the union territory of Mizoram from 6 April 1981 to 9 August 1983, prior to its attainment of statehood in 1987. Kohli authored We dared, a memoir of the Indian Navy operations during the war of 1971. He is also the author of Sea Power and the Indian Ocean, an analysis of the geo-political and maritime concerns in the Indian Ocean region.

== Personal life ==
Kohli was married to the late Sumitra Kohli, and had three daughters.

Military offices
Preceded by Sardarilal Mathradas Nanda	Commanding officer INS Mysore; 1958–1961	Succeeded by Douglas St. John Cameron
Preceded by C L Bhandari	Chief of Materiel; 1963–1965	Succeeded by P. S. Mahindroo
Preceded by Sardarilal Mathradas Nanda	Flag Officer Commanding Indian Fleet; 1967–1968	Office abolished
New title Office established	Flag Officer Commanding Western Fleet; 1968–1969	Succeeded by V. A. Kamath
Preceded by Lieutenant General M M Khanna	Commandant of the National Defence College; 1969–1971	Succeeded by Air Marshal Hrushikesh Moolgavkar
Preceded by Nilakanta Krishnan	Flag Officer Commanding-in-Chief Western Naval Command; 1971–1973	Succeeded by Jal Cursetji
Preceded by Sardarilal Mathradas Nanda	Chief of the Naval Staff; 1973–1976	Succeeded by Jal Cursetji
