= INS Shivaji =

Indian naval base in Lonavala, Maharashtra

- Part of Western Naval Command
- Lonavala, Maharashtra in India
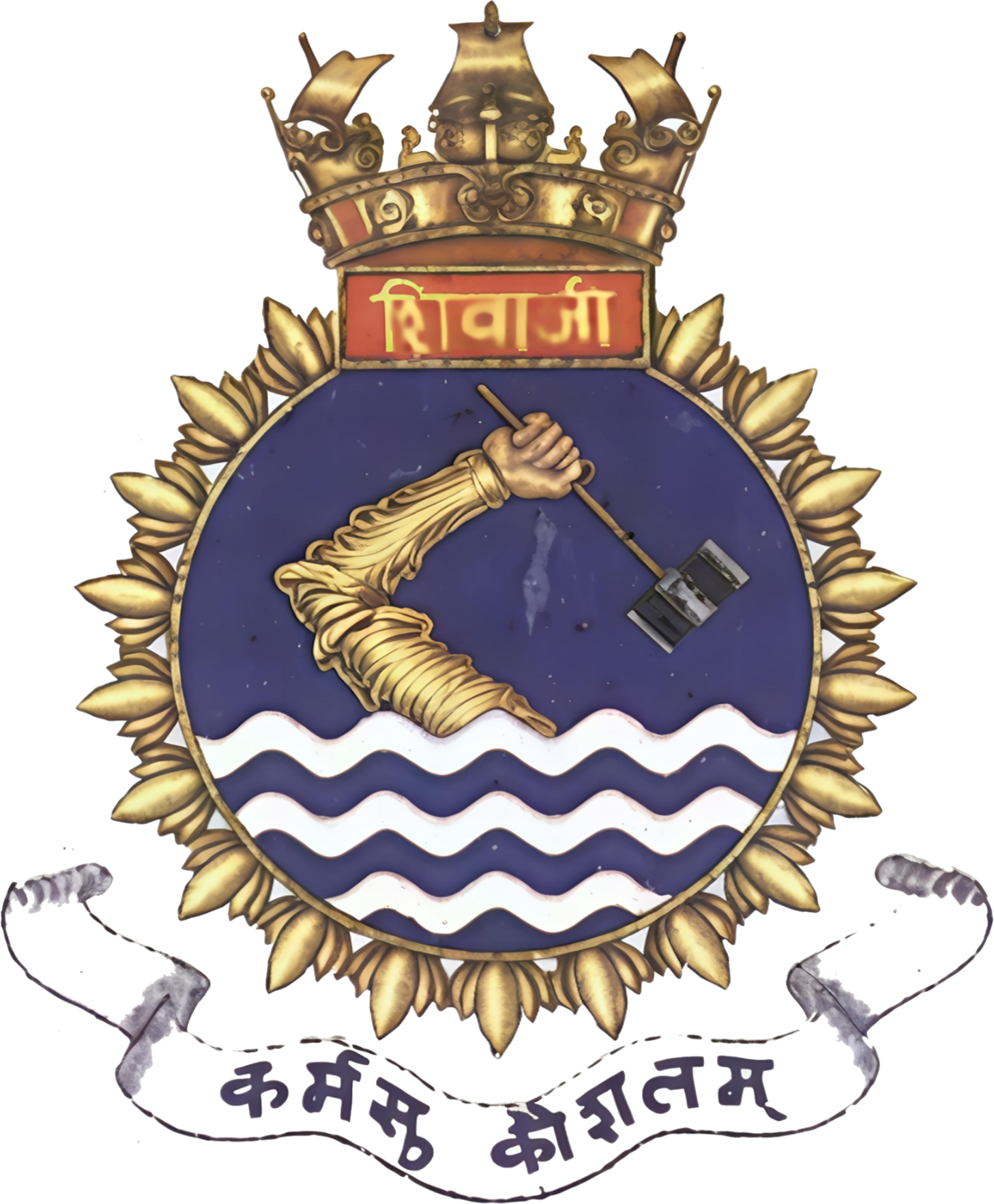
- INS Shivaji Crest

Site information
- Type: Naval Station; Technical Training Establishment
- Owner: Government of India
- Operator: Indian Navy
- Website: INS Shivaji

Location
- Location of INS Shivaji in Maharashtra, India
- Coordinates: 18.720053°N 73.373892°E
- Area: 876 acres (355 ha)
- Height: 700 m (2,300 ft) above sea level

Site history
- Built: 15 February 1945
- In use: 1945 – present

Garrison information
- Current commander: Commodore Mohit Goel, NM
- Past commanders: Nilakanta Krishnan

INS Shivaji is an Indian naval station located in Lonavala, Maharashtra, India. It houses the Naval College of Engineering which trains officers of the Indian Navy and the Indian Coast Guard. It was commissioned on 15 February 1945 as HMIS Shivaji. It is located close to the Bhushi Dam. It is located on 876 acres (355 hectares) of land.

Indian Navy already operates a first damage control simulator Akshat at INS Shivaji to train its officers and sailors on damage control on a warship at sea. Indian Navy's Nuclear, Biological and Chemical Defence (NBCD) School and Center for Marine Engineering Technology are also based here.

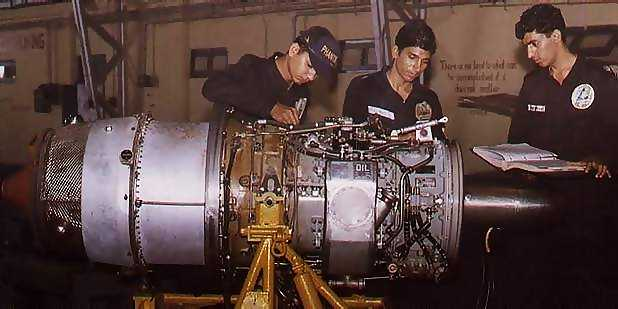
Engineers at work in INS Shivaji

== History ==
INS Shivaji had its origin as replacement for the ‘Stokers’ Training School’ at HMIS Dalhousie, in Naval Dockyard, Bombay (now Mumbai). Commissioned by the then Governor of Bombay, John Colville, as HMIS Shivaji on 15 February 1945, it became INS Shivaji on 26 January 1950. To provide scope for further expansion and to isolate the trainee sailors from the country's politics, the Royal Indian Navy decided to shift the training establishment from Bombay to a quieter place. While the British were on the lookout for a suitable location, coincidentally an air accident took place in the Sahyadri Ranges. Those who came to investigate the accident found more than what they sought. Sandwiched between a sheer vertical rock face, covering the entire height of the hill range (the Tiger's Leap) on one side and another imposing rock formation (the Duke's Nose or Nagphani) on the other, here was this flat piece of land.

== Schools ==
INS Shivaji has three premier institutions viz. Centre of Marine Engineering and Technology (CMET), Centre of Excellence (CoE) and Nuclear, Biological and Chemical Defence (NBCD) School. INS Shivaji has an annual training throughput of more than 2800 officers and 7800 sailors from the Indian Navy. It also trains personnel from the navies of 20 friendly countries worldwide with an annual throughput of over 250 international trainees on an average.

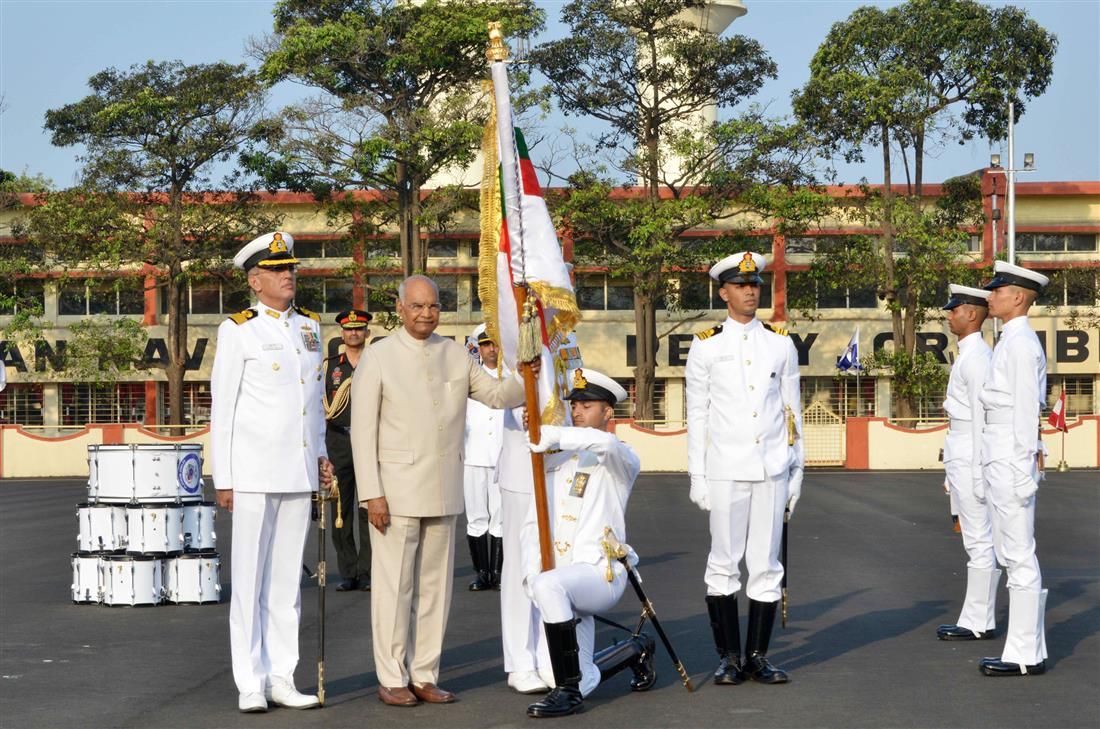
The President, Shri Ram Nath Kovind presenting the President’s Colour to the INS Shivaji on February 13, 2020

=== Naval College of Engineering ===
The Naval College of Engineering undertakes B.Tech. courses at the entry-level for technical officers’ entry into the Service. It is affiliated to Jawaharlal Nehru University, New Delhi. The faculty is a mix of (Defence Research and Development Organisation) DRDscientists and Naval officers.

=== Centre of Marine Engineering Technology (CMET) ===
The Centre of Marine Engineering Technology (CMET) is a facility equipped to undertake ab initio, qualifying and marine specialisation courses for officers, sailors and civilians. It also undertakes a specialised pre-commissioning training of officers and sailors on actual equipment fitment onboard war vessels prior to appointment. The training wings also include the EPCT School. It has a Cadet’s Training Department which is similar to an Officers’ Training Academy which undertakes training of cadets in personality development, leadership qualities and waterman ship.

=== Nuclear, Biological, and Chemical Defense (NBCD) School ===
The NBCD School conducts training in nuclear, biological and chemical aspects, damage control and fire-fighting. It has a damage control simulator namely Akshat. It is a facility for practical training in simulated damage control procedures on board the ship.

== Awards ==
India's President Ram Nath Kovind awarded the coveted President’s Colours to INS Shivaji on 13 Feb 2020. The President’s Colour is the highest honour that can be bestowed upon any military unit in India.

== See also ==
Indian navy

- List of Indian Navy bases
- List of active Indian Navy ships

Integrated commands and units

- Armed Forces Special Operations Division
- Defence Cyber Agency
- Integrated Defence Staff
- Integrated Space Cell
- Indian Nuclear Command Authority
- Indian Armed Forces
- Special Forces of India

Other Lists

- Strategic Forces Command
- List of Indian Air Force stations
- List of Indian Navy bases
- India's overseas military bases
