= HMIS Tir =

River-class frigate of the Royal Indian Navy

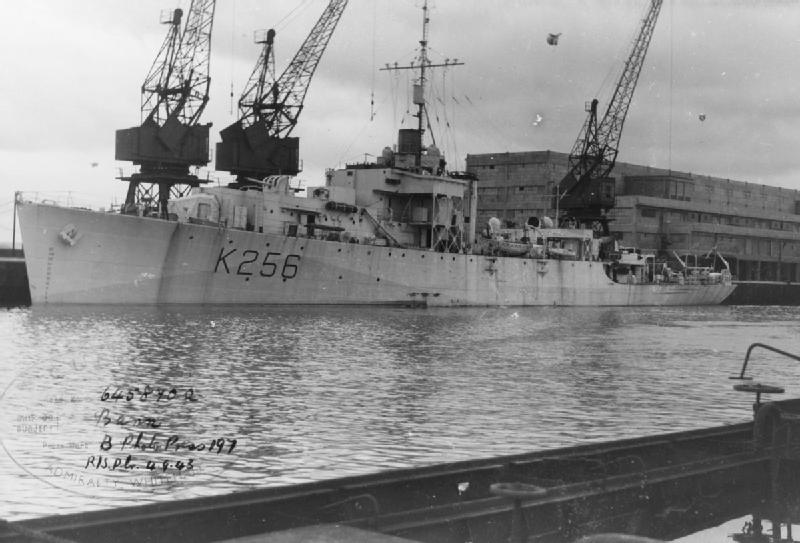
- Bann at a quay

History

United Kingdom
- Name: Bann
- Namesake: River Bann
- Builder: Charles Hill & Sons
- Laid down: 18 June 1942
- Launched: 29 December 1942
- Commissioned: 7 May 1943
- Decommissioned: 3 December 1945
- Identification: Pennant number: K256
- Fate: Transferred to the Royal Indian Navy

India
- Name: Tir; (later, INS Tir)
- Namesake: Hindi तीर, "arrow"
- Acquired: 3 December 1945
- Decommissioned: 30 September 1977
- Identification: Pennant number: K256
- Fate: Scrapped 1979

General characteristics
- Class & type: River-class frigate
- Displacement: 1,370 long tons (1,390 t; 1,530 short tons); 1,830 long tons (1,860 t; 2,050 short tons) (deep load)
- Length: 283 ft (86.26 m) p/p; 301.25 ft (91.82 m)o/a
- Beam: 36.5 ft (11.13 m)
- Draught: 9 ft (2.74 m); 13 ft (3.96 m) (deep load)
- Propulsion: 2 × Admiralty 3-drum boilers, 2 shafts, reciprocating vertical triple expansion, 5,500 ihp (4,100 kW)
- Speed: 20 knots (37.0 km/h); 20.5 knots (38.0 km/h) (turbine ships)
- Range: 440 long tons (450 t; 490 short tons) oil fuel; 7,200 nautical miles (13,334 km) at 12 knots (22.2 km/h)
- Complement: 107
- Armament: 2 × QF 4 in (102 mm) /40 Mk.XIX, single mounts CP Mk.XXIII; up to 10 × QF 20 mm Oerlikon A/A on twin mounts Mk.V and single mounts Mk.III; 1 × Hedgehog 24 spigot A/S projector; up to 150 depth charges

HMIS Tir was a River-class frigate of the Royal Indian Navy (RIN). She was acquired from the Royal Navy where she served as HMS Bann during World War II. She was commissioned into the RIN in December 1945.

She was converted into a midshipman's training ship in Bombay in 1948. After the Indian independence she was inducted into the Indian Navy as INS Tir. In 1953 she took part in the Fleet Review to celebrate the Coronation of Queen Elizabeth II.

She was decommissioned in 1977. An oil painting of the ship hangs at the Indian Naval Headquarters in New Delhi.

== Publications ==
- Colledge, J. J.; Warlow, Ben (2006) [1969]. Ships of the Royal Navy: The Complete Record of All Fighting Ships of the Royal Navy from the 15th Century to the Present (3rd Rev ed.). London: Chatham Publishing. ISBN 978-1-86176-281-8. OCLC 67375475.
