= Girish Luthra =

Officer of the Indian Navy

Vice Admiral Girish Luthra PVSM, AVSM, VSM, ADC
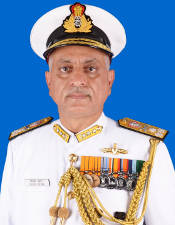
- Vice Admiral Girish Luthra
- Military career
- Allegiance: India
- Branch: Indian Navy
- Service years: June 1979 - January 2019
- Rank: Vice admiral
- Commands: Western Naval Command; Southern Naval Command; INS Viraat; INS Talwar; INS Khukri
- Awards: Param Vishisht Seva Medal; Ati Vishist Seva Medal; Vishisht Seva Medal

Vice Admiral Girish Luthra, PVSM, AVSM, VSM, ADC is a retired officer of Indian Navy who served as flag officer commanding-in-chief (FOC-in-C), Western Naval Command from 1 June 2016 to 30 January 2019. He took over the position from Admiral Sunil Lanba, who was promoted to chief of naval staff, and was succeeded by Vice Admiral Ajit Kumar.

== Early life and education ==
Luthra has attended the National Defence Academy, Pune; Defence Services Staff College, Wellington; and Naval War College, Newport.

== Biography ==
Luthra was commissioned into the executive branch of the Navy in July 1979. He has commanded three warships, including INS Khukri, INS Talwar and INS Viraat. He has also served as the navigation officer of many warships, including INS Betwa, INS Dunagiri, INS Gomati and INS Viraat. His staff appointments include deputy naval attaché at High Commission of India, London; fleet navigating officer of Western Fleet; command plans officer at HQ, Eastern Naval Command; principal director naval plans; assistant chief of naval staff (policy & plans); flag officer commanding Western Fleet; director general naval operations; and deputy chief of integrated defence staff (operations). He was the FOC-in-C of Southern Naval Command before being appointed as FOC-in-C of Western Naval Command.

During his career of almost four decades, he was awarded the Param Vishisht Seva Medal (2017), Ati Vishisht Seva Medal, and the Vishisht Seva Medal for his service.

Luthra is known to be a gifted singer as well. He rendered the new version of the famous song "Ghar Se Nikalte Hi" (original artist: Amaal Malik, Arman Malik), a remake of the same from film "Papa Kehte Hain" as originally crooned by Udit Narayan, live at Western Command Golden Jubilee ceremony, garnering many views on YouTube. He has also released videos on Youtube for songs, Soch Na Sake from Airlift (original artists: Arijit Singh and Tulsi Kumar) and Nazm Nazm (original artists: Arko/Ayushmann Khurrana).

== Awards and decorations ==

Param Vishisht Seva Medal	Ati Vishisht Seva Medal	Vishisht Seva Medal	Samanya Seva Medal
Operation Vijay Medal	Sainya Seva Medal	50th Anniversary of Independence Medal	30 Years Long Service Medal
20 Years Long Service Medal		9 Years Long Service Medal	

Military offices
Preceded by Sunil Lanba	Flag Officer Commanding-in-Chief Western Naval Command; 31 May 2016 – 30 January 2019	Succeeded by Ajit Kumar P
Preceded by Sunil Lanba	Flag Officer Commanding-in-Chief Southern Naval Command; 2016 - 29 May 2016	Succeeded by AR Karve
New appointment	Director General Naval Operations; April 2013 - December 2014	Succeeded by Anil Kumar Chawla
Preceded by Rama Kant Pattanaik	Flag Officer Commanding Western Fleet; 18 January 2011 - 25 May 2012	Succeeded by AR Karve
Preceded by Surinder Pal Singh Cheema	Commanding officer INS Viraat; 15 May 2006 - 11 August 2007	Succeeded by Abhay Raghunath Karve
