= K. R. Nair =

Rear Admiral K. R. Nair PVSM
- Born: 1915
- Died: 2007 (aged 91–92)
- Military career
- Allegiance: British Raj; India
- Branch: Royal Indian Navy; Indian Navy
- Service years: 1942–1971
- Rank: Rear Admiral
- Nickname: Jerry
- Commands: Eastern Naval Command; Flag Officer, East Coast; INS Venduruthy; INS Valsura; 22nd Destroyer Squadron; INS Rana
- Conflicts: World War II

Rear Admiral Kesavapillai Ramakrishnan "Jerry" Nair PVSM (1915–2007) was a former Flag officer in the Indian Navy who served as the first Flag Officer Commanding-in-Chief Eastern Naval Command.

== Career ==
=== Early career ===
Nair was commissioned in the Royal Indian Naval Volunteer Reserve (RINVR) in 1942, and was promoted temporary acting lieutenant on 8 April 1943. In 1944, he attended a specialist anti-submarine course in the United Kingdom. On 21 January 1945, he was posted to HMIS Machlimar at Bombay, whose executive officer was Lieutenant-Commander Ram Dass Katari.

=== Post-Independence ===
Nair was promoted to acting commander (paid) on 31 December 1949 and to substantive commander on 30 June 1951. On 3 January 1955, he was appointed CO, INS Venduruthy at Cochin with the acting rank of captain, receiving promotion to the substantive rank on 31 December 1955. He held several important commands, including CO of INS Rana, captain of the 22nd Destroyer Squadron and INS Valsura at Jamnagar. He was appointed Chief of Personnel (COP) at Naval Headquarters on 20 November 1959, in the rank of commodore, and served until 1963, when he was appointed chief of staff to the Flag Officer Commanding Indian Fleet (FOCIF), serving under Rear Admirals Adhar Kumar Chatterji and Benjamin Abraham Samson. In June 1965, he was appointed to a second tenure as Chief of Personnel and was promoted rear admiral in August when the post was raised to flag rank.

In July 1967, Nair was appointed the first Flag Officer East Coast, based at Vishakhapatnam. Eight months later, on 1 March 1968, he became the first Flag Officer Commanding-in-Chief Eastern Naval Command (FOC-in-C, ENC) when the post was upgraded. He was awarded the Param Vishisht Seva Medal (PVSM) on 26 January 1969, and retired from the Navy in March 1971. He died in 2007.

Military offices
New title Post upgraded from Flag Officer East Coast	Flag Officer Commanding-in-Chief Eastern Naval Command; 1968-1971	Succeeded by Nilakanta Krishnan
Preceded by Douglas St. John Cameron (as Commodore East Coast)	Flag Officer East Coast; 1967-1968	Post upgraded to FOC-in-C Eastern Naval Command
Preceded by Douglas St. John Cameron	Chief of Personnel (second tenure); 1965-1967	Succeeded by Jal Cursetji
Preceded by G. S. Kapoor	Chief of Personnel (first tenure); 1959-1963	Succeeded by Douglas St. John Cameron
