= Director General Naval Operations =

Senior Appointment in the Indian Navy

- Flag of the Vice Admiral

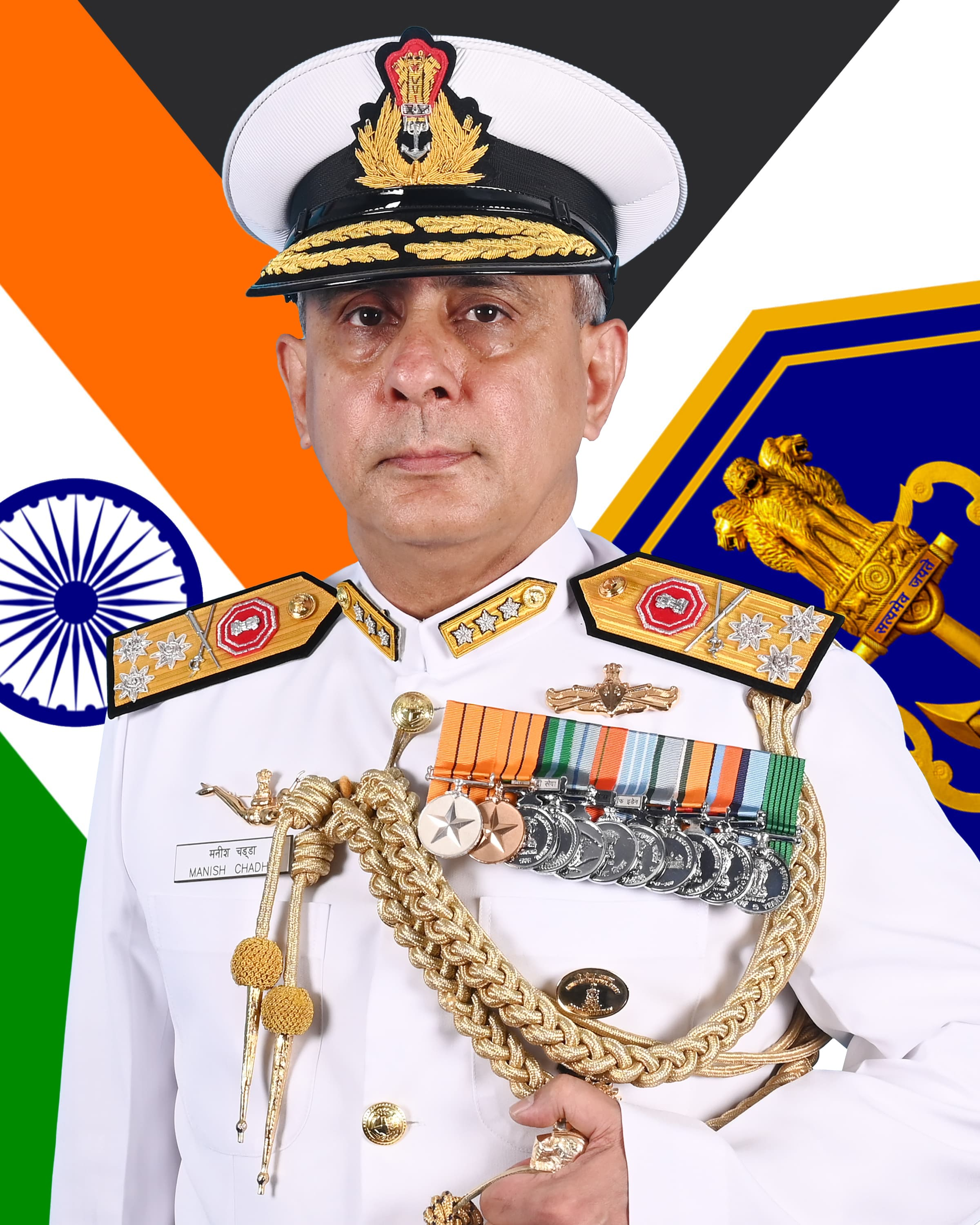
- Incumbent; Vice Admiral Manish Chadha AVSM VSM
- Indian Navy
- Type: Director General
- Abbreviation: DGNO
- Reports to: Deputy Chief of the Naval Staff
- Seat: Naval Headquarters, New Delhi

The Director General Naval Operations (DGNO) is a senior appointment in the Indian Navy. The DGNO is responsible for planning, executing, and overseeing all operational aspects of the Indian Navy. The office is held by a Three star officer in the rank of Vice Admiral.

== History ==
At the time of independence of India on 15 August 1947, the Directorate of Operations was under the Chief of Staff to the Commander-in-Chief, Royal Indian Navy, the de facto Second-in-command. In 1949, the Chief of Staff was also made Deputy Commander-in-Chief RIN. In 1955, the post was re-designated Deputy Chief of the Naval Staff (DCNS). The Directorate continued to be under the DCNS until 1984, when an Assistant Principal Staff Officer (APSO) appointment called Assistant Chief of Naval Staff (Operations) (ACNS Ops) was created. A two-star appointment, the ACNS (Ops) continued to report into the DCNS.

In 1986, the Directorates of Submarine Operations, Tactics, Diving and Oceanology & Meteorology were added to ACNS (Ops). In 1997, Information warfare was added to the mandate of ACNS (Ops) and the appointment was re-designated ACNS (IWOPS). In 2013, the appointment was upgraded to Three-star rank and re-designated Director General Naval Operations. Vice Admiral Girish Luthra took over as the first DGNO.

== Current organisation ==
The DGNO is part of the Staff Branch-II at the Naval Headquarters, reporting into the Deputy Chief of the Naval Staff. The following Assistant Principal Staff Officers and directorates report into the DGNO.

- Assistant Chief of Naval Staff (Communication, Space and Network Centric Operations)
  - Directorate of Naval Signals
  - Directorate Network and Space Operations
  - Directorate of Network Centric Operations
- Directorate of Naval Operations
- Directorate of Special Operations and Diving
- Directorate of Information Warfare
- Directorate of Naval Oceanology and Meteorology
- Directorate of Submarine Operations
- Naval History Division

== Directors General Naval Operations ==
S.No.	Name	Assumed office	Left office	Notes
1	Vice Admiral Girish Luthra AVSM VSM	8 April 2013	31 December 2014	Later Flag Officer Commanding-in-Chief Western Naval Command.
2	Vice Admiral Anil Kumar Chawla AVSM NM VSM	31 December 2014	27 May 2016	Later Flag Officer Commanding-in-Chief Southern Naval Command.
3	Vice Admiral Satishkumar Namdeo Ghormade AVSM NM	28 May 2016	13 February 2019	Later Vice Chief of the Naval Staff.
4	Vice Admiral M. A. Hampiholi AVSM NM	27 March 2019	12 August 2020	Later Flag Officer Commanding-in-Chief Southern Naval Command.
5	Vice Admiral Dinesh Kumar Tripathi AVSM NM	13 August 2020	30 May 2021	Later Chief of the Naval Staff.
6	Vice Admiral Rajesh Pendharkar AVSM VSM	7 June 2021	31 March 2023	Later Flag Officer Commanding-in-Chief Eastern Naval Command.
7	Vice Admiral Atul Anand AVSM VSM	1 April 2023	3 July 2023	Current Additional Secretary, Department of Military Affairs.
8	Vice Admiral A. N. Pramod AVSM	21 January 2024	31 July 2026	Current Deputy Chief of the Naval Staff.
9	Vice Admiral Manish Chadha AVSM VSM	3 August 2026	Incumbent	

== See also ==
- Director General of Military Operations
- Director General Air Operations

== Bibliography ==
- Doraibabu, M; Godbole, Amrut (2023), A Decade of Transformation: The Indian Navy 2011-2021, Harper Collins Publishers India, ISBN 978-93-94407-90-9
- Hiranandani, G M (2005), Transition to eminence : the Indian navy 1976-1990, Lancer Publishers, ISBN 978-8170622666
- Hiranandani, G. M. (2010), Transition to Guardianship: The Indian Navy 1991-2000, Lancer InterConsult, Incorporated, ISBN 978-1935501268
