= Abhay Raghunath Karve =

Vice Admiral A R Karve PVSM, AVSM
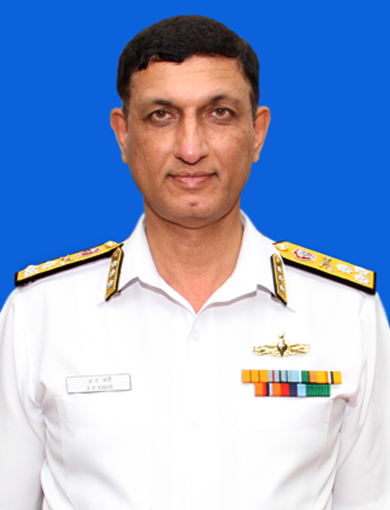
- Military career
- Allegiance: India
- Branch: Indian Navy
- Service years: 1 July 1980 - 30 July 2018
- Rank: Vice Admiral
- Commands: Southern Naval Command; Western Fleet; INS Viraat; INS Ranvijay
- Awards: Param Vishisht Seva Medal; Ati Vishisht Seva Medal

Abhay Raghunath Karve PVSM, AVSM is a retired Indian Navy Vice Admiral. He last served as the 27th Flag Officer Commanding-in-Chief Southern Naval Command. He retired on 30 July 2018 and was succeeded by Vice Admiral Anil Kumar Chawla.

== Education ==
Karve did his undergraduate studies at National Defence Academy, Khadakvasla. He is a graduate of Defence Services Staff College (DSSC) Wellington, Ooty, and has undergone the Naval Higher Command Course from College of Naval Warfare at Mumbai. He is also a post graduate in National Security and Strategy from the National Defense University, Washington DC (USA).

== Career ==
Karve joined the Indian Navy on 1 July 80, specializing in Anti-Submarine Warfare in 1986 and has commanded the aircraft carrier INS Viraat as well as the guided missile destroyer INS Ranvijay, the frigate INS Dunagiri and the ASW patrol vessel INS Ajay. In 2015 he was appointed Chief of Personnel.

Karve has been awarded the Ati Vishist Seva Medal in 2013 and the Param Vishisht Seva Medal in 2018.

== Honours and awards ==
=== Military awards ===

Param Vishisht Seva Medal	Ati Vishisht Seva Medal	Operation Vijay Medal	Operation Parakram Medal
50th Anniversary of Independence Medal	30 Years Long Service Medal	20 Years Long Service Medal	9 Years Long Service Medal

Military offices
Preceded by Girish Luthra	Flag Officer Commanding-in-Chief Southern Naval Command; 29 May 2016 - 30 July 2018	Succeeded by Anil Kumar Chawla
Preceded by Parasurama Naidu Murugesan	Chief of Personnel; 2015–2016	Succeeded by Anil Kumar Chawla
Preceded by Girish Luthra	Flag Officer Commanding Western Fleet; 25 May 2012 – 15 August 2013	Succeeded by Anil Kumar Chawla
Preceded by Girish Luthra	Commanding officer INS Viraat; 11 August 2007 – 27 December 2008	Succeeded by Anil Kumar Chawla
