= Chief of Personnel (Indian Navy) =

- Flag of the Vice Admiral

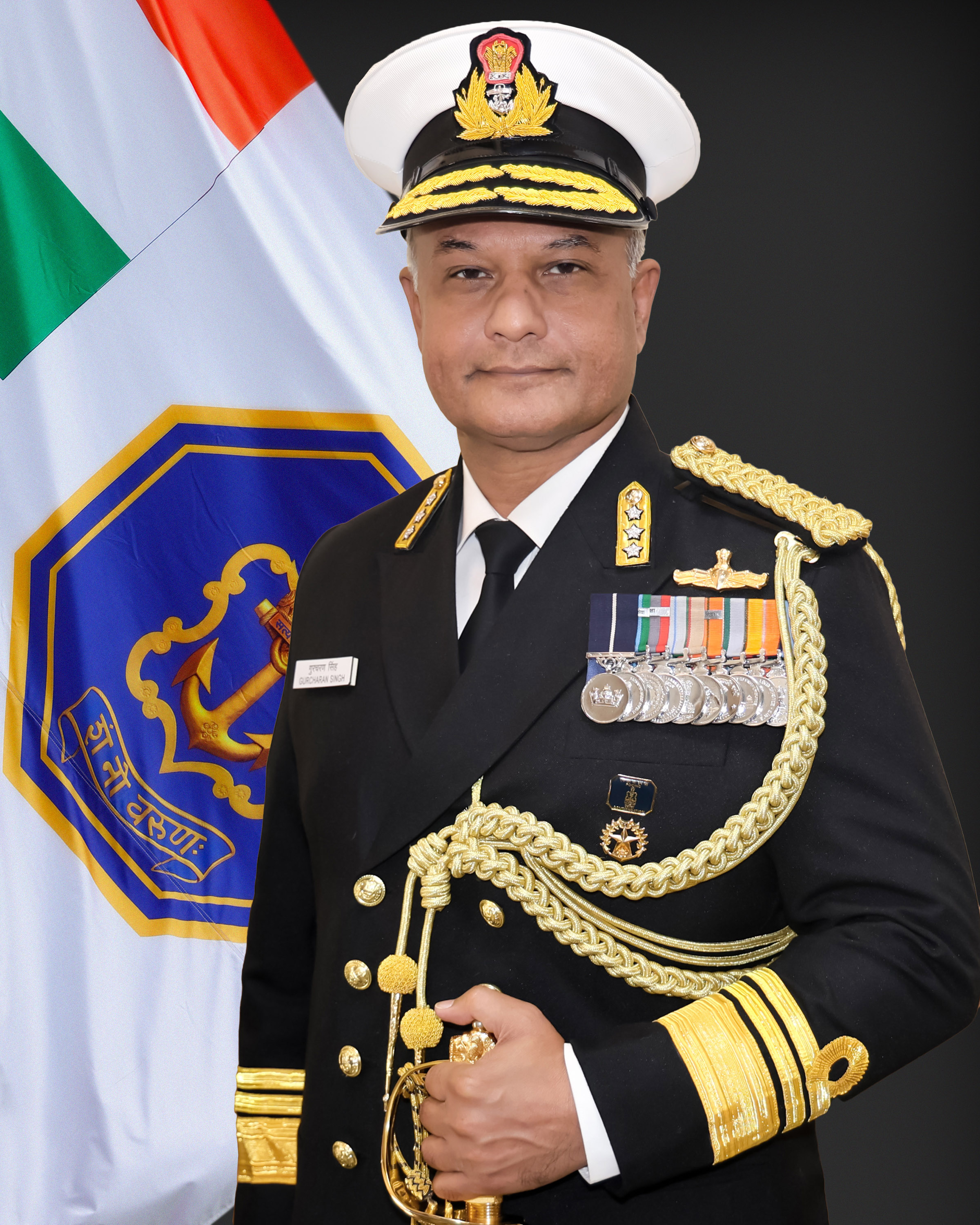
- Incumbent; Vice Admiral Gurcharan Singh AVSM NM since 1 November 2025
- Indian Navy
- Type: Principal Staff Officer
- Abbreviation: C.O.P
- Reports to: Chief of the Naval Staff
- Seat: Naval Headquarters, New Delhi

The Chief of Personnel (COP) in the Indian Navy is a senior appointment in the rank of Vice-Admiral. As a Principal Staff Officer (PSO) at Naval Headquarters (NHQ), the COP is responsible for personnel-related matters. The present COP is Vice Admiral Gurcharan Singh who was appointed on 1 November 2025.

== History ==
At the time of Independence of India, the COP was one of five PSOs at Naval headquarters. The appointment was held by an officer of the rank of Captain. On 24 September 1956, the appointment was upgraded to the rank of Commodore (Second Class). The directorates of personnel services, training education, medical services, judge advocate general and the supply branch were under the COP.

In 1965, the appointment was further upgraded to Rear Admiral. Rear Admiral K. R. Nair was the first COP in this rank, when he took over on 17 August 1965. The post was further upgraded to Vice Admiral in March 1973. During this re-organisation, an assistant PSO post was created - Assistant Chief of Personnel (ACOP) - a two-star appointment. In the 1980s, two new directorates were formed under the COP - Financial Planning (Non-public funds) in 1985 and Ex-Servicemen Affairs (DESA) in 1988.

== Organisation ==
The COP heads the Personnel Branch at the Naval Headquarters. The following Directors General/Controllers/Assistant Principal Staff Officers report into the COP.

- Controller of Personnel Services
- Director General Medical Services
  - Assistant Director General Medical Services
- Assistant Chief of Personnel (HRD)
- Assistant Chief of Personnel (Administration and Civilian)
- Judge Advocate General

== Appointees ==
| S.No. | Name | Assumed office | Left office | Notes |
|---|---|---|---|---|
| | Commodore Henry Richmond Inigo-Jones | January 1947 | August 1947 | Last British appointee. |
| 1 | Captain Bhaskar Sadashiv Soman | August 1947 | February 1949 | Later Chief of the Naval Staff. |
| 2 | Captain Ram Dass Katari | February 1949 | 14 December 1951 | Later Chief of the Naval Staff. |
| 3 | Captain Benjamin Abraham Samson | 14 December 1951 | June 1954 | |
| 4 | Commodore Sardarilal Mathradas Nanda | September 1954 (Note: Post upgraded to Commodore Second Class from 24 September 1956.) | November 1956 | Later Chief of the Naval Staff. |
| 5 | Commodore Gyan Sarup Kapoor | 18 February 1957 | 20 November 1959 | |
| 6 | Commodore Kesavapillai Ramkrishnan Nair (first tenure) | 20 November 1959 | 1963 | |
| 7 | Commodore Douglas St. John Cameron | 1963 | June 1965 | |
| 8 | Rear Admiral Kesavapillai Ramkrishnan Nair (second tenure) | June 1965 (Note: Post upgraded to Rear Admiral 17 August 1965.) | December 1967 | |
| 9 | Rear Admiral Jal Cursetji | December 1967 | 20 February 1970 | Later Chief of the Naval Staff. |
| | Commodore Elenjikal Chandy Kuruvila | 20 February 1970 | October 1970 | Officiating. |
| 10 | Vice Admiral Rabindra Nath Batra PVSM | October 1970 (Note: Post upgraded to Vice-Admiral in March 1973.) | March 1976 | |
| 11 | Vice Admiral Rustom K. S. Ghandhi VrC | March 1976 | March 1977 | |
| 12 | Vice Admiral Swaraj Parkash PVSM, MVC, AVSM | March 1977 | March 1979 | |
| 13 | Vice Admiral Manohar Prahlad Awati VrC | 1 April 1979 | February 1981 | |
| 14 | Vice Admiral Sardari Lal Sethi AVSM | February 1981 | 25 February 1982 | |
| 15 | Vice Admiral Jayant Ganpat Nadkarni AVSM, VSM, NM | 16 August 1982 | April 1984 | Later Chief of the Naval Staff. |
| 16 | Vice Admiral S. M. Gadihoke PVSM | 30 June 1984 | June 1988 | |
| 17 | Vice Admiral Vasant Laxman Koppikar AVSM | 6 July 1988 | 1992 | |
| 18 | Vice Admiral R. B. Suri | 1992 | December 1994 | |
| 19 | Vice Admiral Kailash K. Kohli AVSM | 5 January 1995 | 30 November 1995 | |
| 20 | Vice Admiral Sushil Kumar UYSM, AVSM, NM | 4 December 1995 | October 1996 | Later Chief of the Naval Staff. |
| 21 | Vice Admiral P. J. Jacob AVSM, VSM | 20 November 1996 | 31 March 1998 | |
| 22 | Vice Admiral John Colin De Silva AVSM | March 1998 | March 1999 | |
| 23 | Vice Admiral Arun Prakash AVSM, VrC, VSM | March 1999 | 3 October 2001 | Later Chief of the Naval Staff. |
| 24 | Vice Admiral Madanjit Singh | 3 October 2001 | May 2002 | |
| 25 | Vice Admiral Sureesh Mehta AVSM | May 2002 | January 2003 | Later Chief of the Naval Staff. |
| 26 | Vice Admiral Yashwant Prasad PVSM, AVSM, VSM | January 2003 | October 2003 | |
| 27 | Vice Admiral Venkat Bharathan AVSM, VSM | October 2003 | August 2005 | Later Vice Chief of the Naval Staff. |
| 28 | Vice Admiral S. K. Damle | August 2005 | July 2007 | |
| 29 | Vice Admiral D. K. Dewan | July 2007 | September 2009 | Later Vice Chief of the Naval Staff. |
| 30 | Vice Admiral M. P. Muralidharan AVSM, NM | September 2009 | January 2012 | |
| 31 | Vice Admiral Anurag Thapliyal AVSM | January 2012 | March 2013 | |
| 32 | Vice Admiral Parasurama Naidu Murugesan AVSM, VSM | March 2013 | 31 July 2015 (Note: Officiating from March-July 2015.) | Later Vice Chief of the Naval Staff. |
| 33 | Vice Admiral Abhay Raghunath Karve AVSM | 24 August 2015 | 28 May 2016 | Later Flag Officer Commanding-in-Chief Southern Naval Command. |
| 34 | Vice Admiral Anil Kumar Chawla AVSM, VSM, NM | 28 May 2016 | 1 August 2018 | Later Flag Officer Commanding-in-Chief Southern Naval Command. |
| 35 | Vice Admiral R. Hari Kumar AVSM, VSM | 1 August 2018 | 2 December 2019 | Later Chief of the Naval Staff. |
| 36 | Vice Admiral Ravneet Singh AVSM, NM | 2 December 2019 | 31 May 2021 | Later Deputy Chief of the Naval Staff. |
| 37 | Vice Admiral Dinesh Kumar Tripathi AVSM, NM | 1 June 2021 | 28 February 2023 | Later Chief of the Naval Staff. |
| 38 | Vice Admiral Suraj Berry AVSM, NM, VSM | 1 April 2023 | 6 October 2023 | Later Commander-in-Chief, Strategic Forces Command. |
| 39 | Vice Admiral Krishna Swaminathan AVSM, VSM | 6 October 2023 | 30 April 2024 | Current Chief of the Naval Staff. |
| 40 | Vice Admiral Sanjay Bhalla AVSM, NM | 10 May 2024 | 31 October 2025 | Current Flag Officer Commanding-in-Chief Eastern Naval Command. |
| 41 | Vice Admiral Gurcharan Singh AVSM, NM | 1 November 2025 | Present | |

== Bibliography ==
- Hiranandani, G.M. (1999), Transition to Triumph: History of the Indian Navy, 1965-1975, Spantech & Lancer, ISBN 978-1897829721
