= Rajesh Pendharkar =

Indian admiral

Vice Admiral Rajesh Pendharkar PVSM AVSM VSM
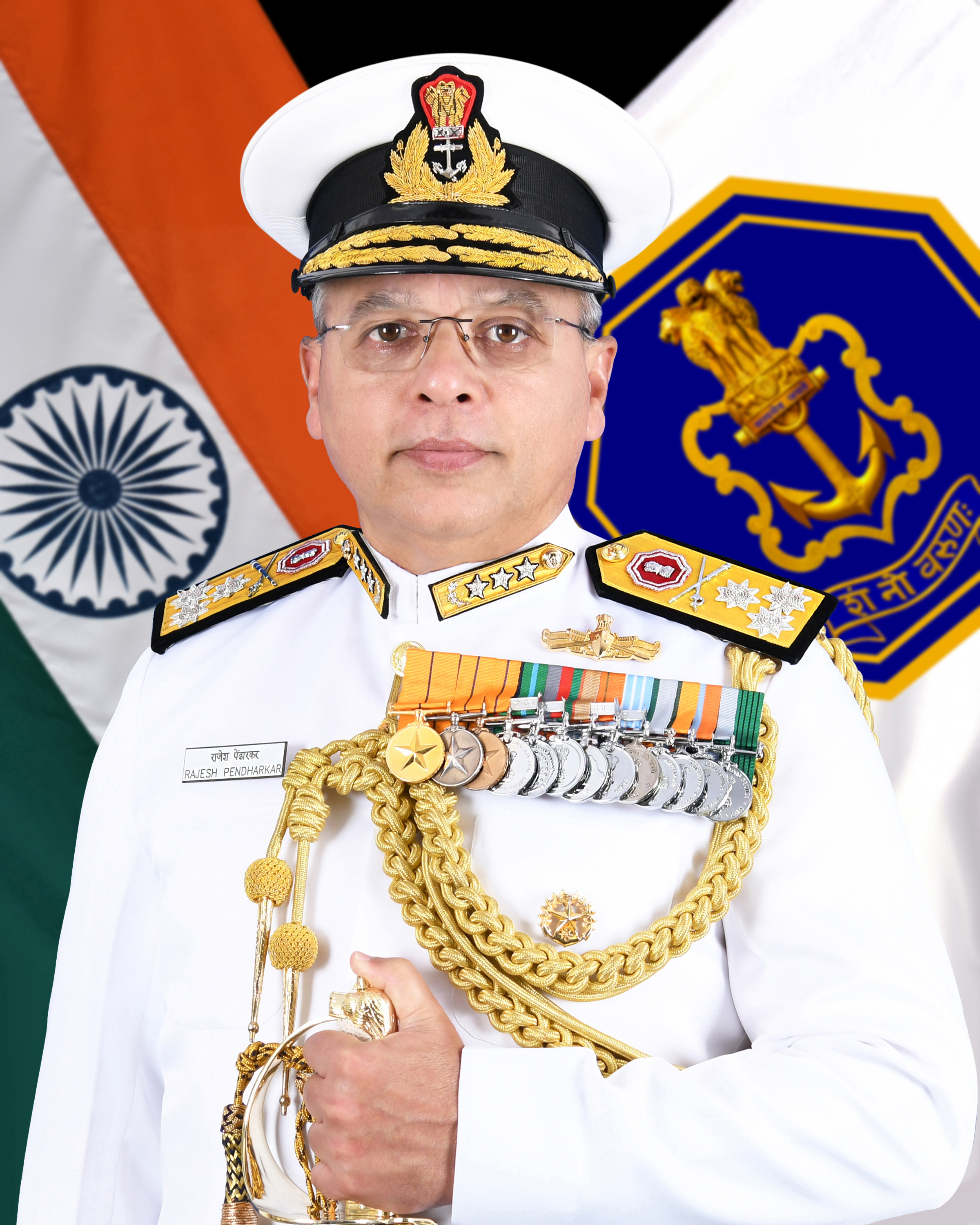

Flag Officer Commanding-in-Chief Eastern Naval Command
- In office 1 August 2023 – 31 October 2025
- Chief of Naval Staff: R. Hari Kumar; Dinesh Kumar Tripathi
- Preceded by: Biswajit Dasgupta
- Succeeded by: Sanjay Bhalla

Personal details
- Born: October 1965 (age 60–61)
- Education: Indian Naval Academy
- Awards: Ati Vishisht Seva Medal; Vishisht Seva Medal

Military service
- Allegiance: India
- Branch/service: Indian Navy
- Years of service: 1987 - 2025
- Rank: Vice Admiral
- Commands: Eastern Naval Command; Maharashtra Naval Area; INS Viraat (R22); INS Shivalik (F47); INS Kora (P61)

Vice Admiral Rajesh Sudhakar Pendharkar, PVSM, AVSM, VSM is a former Flag officer in the Indian Navy. He last served as the Flag Officer Commanding-in-Chief Eastern Naval Command. He earlier served as the Deputy Chief of the Integrated Defence Staff (Operations) and as the Director General Naval Operations.

== Education ==
Pendharkar is a graduate of the National Defence Academy, Khadakvasla. He was commissioned into the Indian Navy in January 1987. He attended the graduate course of the Defence Services Staff College, Wellington, as well as the Naval War College. Pendharkar also attended the Naval Command College, Rhode Island, USA. He holds a Master’s Degree in Defence and Strategic Studies.

== Navy career ==
Pendharkar was commissioned into the Indian Navy in January 1987. He is an Anti-Submarine Warfare (ASW) specialist. His operational assignments include commissioning crew of the Sukanya-class patrol vessel INS Subhadra (P51), ASW Officer of the Nilgiri-class frigate INS Dunagiri (F36) and the Godavari-class guided-missile frigate INS Ganga (F22).

Pendharkar served as the Executive Officer of the Khukri-class corvette INS Kirpan (P44) and the Delhi-class guided-missile destroyer INS Mysore (D60). He has commanded the lead ship of her class of corvettes INS Kora (P61) and the lead ship of her class of stealth missile frigates INS Shivalik (F47). He also commanded the aircraft carrier INS Viraat (R22) and was her penultimate commanding officer.

His staff assignments include Flag Lieutenant to the Flag Officer Commanding Maharashtra Naval Area, and instructor at the National Defence Academy. He has also served as Joint Director in the Directorate of Staff Requirements and Joint Director in the Directorate of Personnel, both at naval headquarters. As a Commodore, he served as the Principal Director, Net-Centric Operations and as the Principal Director in the Directorate of Personnel at NHQ.

=== Flag rank ===
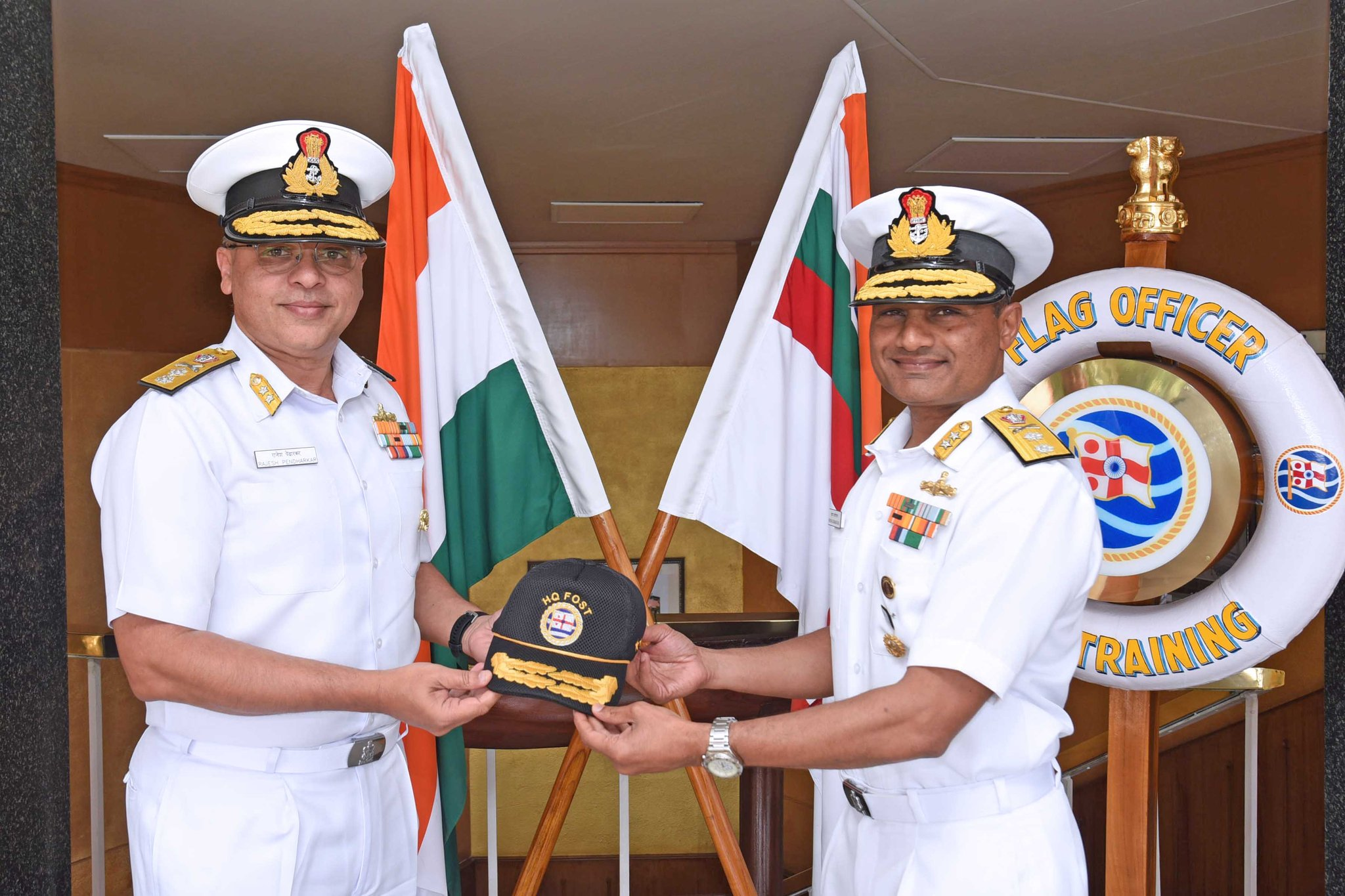
Pendharkar (right) takes over as FOST from Rear Admiral Krishna Swaminathan.

Pendharkar was promoted to the rank of Rear Admiral in February 2016 and was appointed Assistant Chief of Integrated Defence Staff (ACIDS) at the Defence Intelligence Agency. He then moved to HQ Western Naval Command as the Chief Staff Officer (Operations). On 25 March 2019, he was appointed Flag Officer Commanding Maharashtra Naval Area. After a year-long stint, in February 2020, he took over as the Flag Officer Sea Training (FOST) in Kochi. As FOST, his charter included the conduct of the operational sea training of all ships of the Indian Navy and the Indian Coast Guard.

On 7 June 2021, he was promoted to the rank of Vice Admiral and appointed Director General Naval Operations at Naval HQ. He subsequently served as the Deputy Chief of Integrated Defence Staff (Operations) at New Delhi. On 1 August 2023, he assumed charge as the Flag Officer Commanding-in-Chief Eastern Naval Command (FOC-in-C ENC), taking over from Vice Admiral Biswajit Dasgupta at a ceremonial parade held at the Naval Base Visakhapatnam.

== Awards and decorations ==
Pendharkar is a recipient of the Param Vishisht Seva Medal (PVSM), the Ati Vishisht Seva Medal (AVSM) and Vishisht Seva Medal (VSM) for distinguished service.

Param Vishisht Seva Medal	Ati Vishisht Seva Medal	Vishisht Seva Medal	Samanya Seva Medal
Special Service Medal	Operation Parakram Medal	Sainya Seva Medal	Videsh Seva Medal
75th Anniversary of Independence Medal	50th Anniversary of Independence Medal		30 Years Long Service Medal
20 Years Long Service Medal		9 Years Long Service Medal	

Military offices
Preceded by Biswajit Dasgupta	Commanding officer INS Viraat; 1 June 2015 – 13 July 2016	Succeeded by Puneet Chadha
Preceded by Puneet Kumar Bahl	Flag Officer Commanding Maharashtra Naval Area; 2019 - 2020	Succeeded by Vennam Srinivas
Preceded by Krishna Swaminathan	Flag Officer Sea Training; 2020 - 2021	Succeeded by Rajesh Dhankhar
Preceded by Dinesh K Tripathi	Director General Naval Operations; 2021 - 2023	Succeeded by Atul Anand
Preceded by Sanjay Jasjit Singh	Deputy Chief of the Integrated Defence Staff (Operations); 2023 - 2023	Succeeded by Sanjay Vatsayan
Preceded by Biswajit Dasgupta	Flag Officer Commanding-in-Chief Eastern Naval Command; 1 August 2023 – 31 October 2025	Succeeded by Sanjay Bhalla
