= INS Viraat =

Centaur-class aircraft carrier of the Indian Navy

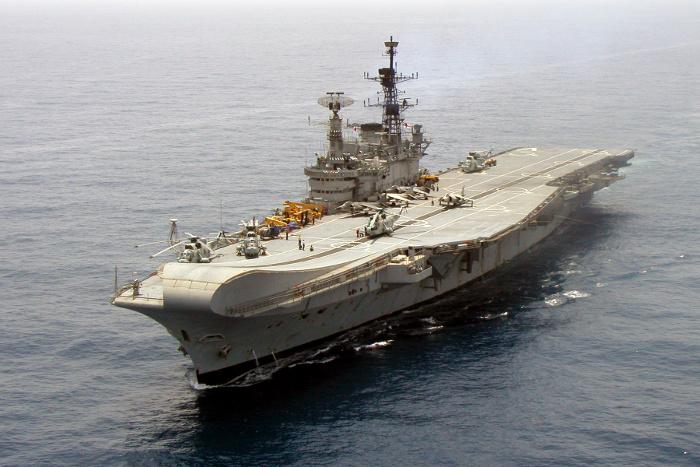
- INS Viraat (R22) in 2002

India
- Name: Viraat
- Acquired: May 1987
- Recommissioned: 12 May 1987
- Decommissioned: 6 March 2017
- Out of service: 23 July 2016
- Refit: April 1986, July 1999, Mid-2003-November 2004, August 2008-November 2009, November 2012-July 2013
- Home port: Mumbai, Maharashtra
- Identification: Pennant number: R22
- Motto: Jalameva Yasya, Balameva Tasya (Sanskrit: "He who rules over the seas is all powerful")
- Nickname(s): Grand Old Lady
- Fate: Scrapped at Alang, 2020-2021

United Kingdom
- Name: HMS Hermes (R12)
- Ordered: 1943
- Builder: Vickers-Armstrongs
- Laid down: 21 June 1944
- Launched: 16 February 1953
- Commissioned: 25 November 1959
- Decommissioned: 1984
- Stricken: 1985
- Home port: HMNB Portsmouth
- Identification: Pennant number: R12
- Fate: Sold to India in 1986

General characteristics
- Class & type: Centaur-class light aircraft carrier
- Displacement: 23,900 tons standard; 28,700 tons full load
- Length: 226.5 m (743 ft)
- Beam: 48.78 m (160.0 ft)
- Draught: 8.8 m (29 ft)
- Propulsion: 2 × Parsons geared steam turbines; 4 boilers with 400 psi, 76,000 shp (57,000 kW)
- Speed: 28 knots (52 km/h)
- Range: 6,500 mi (10,500 km) at 14 knots (26 km/h)
- Complement: Maximum 2,100; 1,207 ship's crew, 143 air crew
- Sensors & processing systems: 1 × BEL/Signaal RAWL 02 air radar; 1 × RAWS 08 air/surface radar; 2 × BEL Rashmi navigation radars; 1 × EL/M-2221 STGR fire control radar; 1 × Plessey Type 904 radar; 1 × FT 13-S/M Tacan system; Sonar: 1 × Graseby Type 184M hull-mounted sonar
- Electronic warfare & decoys: 1 × BEL Ajanta ESM; Decoy: 2 × Knebworth Corvus chaff launchers
- Armament: 2 × 40 mm Bofors AA guns; 16 × Barak SAM VL cells; 2 × twin AK-230 CIWS
- Aircraft carried: Up to 26 aircraft, including; 16 × British Aerospace Sea Harrier FRS51; 4 × Westland Sea King Mk.42B-C; 2 × HAL Chetak; 4 × HAL Dhruv

INS Viraat (Sanskrit: Virāṭa meaning Giant) was a Centaur-class light aircraft carrier of the Indian Navy. INS Viraat was the flagship of the Indian Navy until INS Vikramaditya was commissioned in 2013. The ship was completed and commissioned in 1959 as the Royal Navy's HMS Hermes, and decommissioned in 1984. She was sold to India in 1987. INS Viraat was commissioned into the Indian Navy on 12 May 1987, and served for almost 30 years.

In February 2015, the Navy stated that Viraat would be decommissioned the following year. The last British-built ship serving with the Indian Navy, she was the oldest aircraft carrier in service in the world. On 23 July 2016, Viraat sailed for the last time under her own power from Mumbai to Kochi, where she was dry-docked and prepared for decommissioning. She was towed out of Kochi on 23 October, returning to Mumbai on 28 October, where she was laid up. Viraat was formally decommissioned on 6 March 2017. After the failure of plans to convert her into a hotel and museum, she was sold for scrap and planned to be broken up beginning in September 2020, but the scrapping was stayed by the Supreme Court of India after 40% of the body had already been scrapped.

== Design ==
INS Viraat had a 12° ski jump to operate the Sea Harrier along with a reinforced flight deck, and 1.2 inches (3 cm) of armour over the magazines and machinery spaces. The magazine capacity included at least 80 lightweight torpedoes. The vessel retained commando transport capability for up to 750 troops and carried four LCVP landing craft in the aft section. In a wartime scenario, the ship could carry up to 26 combat aircraft and was suited for supporting amphibious operations and conducting ASW operations.

=== Aircraft ===
The aircraft on board INS Viraat were operated by four squadrons of the Naval air arm of the Indian Navy:

Air squadrons
Squadron	Name	Aircraft
INAS 300	White Tigers	BAE Sea Harrier
INAS 552	The Braves	BAE Sea Harrier
INAS 321	Angels	Alouette III; HAL Chetak
INAS 330	Harpoons	Westland Sea King

Primary strike aircraft have been the Sea Harriers operating several modern missiles such as the British anti-ship Sea Eagle missile, and the French Matra Magic missile for air-to-air combat. Other ordnance has included 68 mm rockets, runway-denial bombs, cluster bombs, and podded 30 mm cannon. In 2006, the Indian Navy started the 'Limited Upgrade Sea Harrier (LUSH)' program by upgrading up to 15 Sea Harriers in collaboration with Israel by installing the Elta EL/M-2032 radar and the Rafael 'Derby' medium-range air-to-air BVR missile.

The fleet also consisted of Kamov Ka-31 Helix-B airborne early warning aircraft and Kamov Ka-28 Helix-A helicopters.

All Sea Harrier operations from the deck of INS Viraat ceased on 6 May 2016 following the retirement of Harrier fleet.

== Operational history ==
=== Royal Navy ===
INS Viraat was originally commissioned by the British Royal Navy as HMS Hermes on 18 November 1959, 15 years after she was laid down in June 1944. She served as the flagship of the Royal Navy's task force during the Falklands War in 1982 and was decommissioned from active duty in 1985. In April 1986, Hermes was towed from Portsmouth Dockyard to Devonport Dockyard to be refitted, re-activated and sold to India.

=== Indian Navy ===
After evaluating vessels from several countries, the Indian Navy purchased the vessel in April 1986 and gave her an extensive refit at Devonport Dockyard in Plymouth, England, to allow for continued carrier operations into the next decade. New fire control equipment, navigation radars, improved NBC protection, and deck landing aids were installed in this refit. Boilers were converted to operate on distillate fuel.

India Today in 1988 reported that then Prime Minister Rajiv Gandhi went to the Bangaram Atoll in Lakshadweep on a holiday with his family and other prominent politicians and media persons on board the INS Viraat. The allegation has been refuted by a retired Indian Navy officer, Commodore Ajay Chitnis, who was involved in planning former Prime Minister Rajiv Gandhi's 1987 Lakshadweep trip.

In September 1993, the engine room of the ship was flooded, putting the vessel out of service for several months. The vessel was back in service in 1995 and was fitted with a new search radar. Between July 1999 and April 2001, the ship completed another life-extension refit expected to extend her serviceability until 2010. This refit upgraded propulsion systems, added a package of sensors to sound emergency alerts and introduced modern communication systems. In addition, a long-range surveillance radar, weapon systems, and a new hangar with fire curtains were installed. As a consequence of this refit, the ship could not be made ready to fight during Operation Talwar, where operations were instead led by Delhi-class destroyers and Nilgiri-class Frigates. The Indian Navy also studied the feasibility of inducting Trishul missiles as a point defence weapon on Viraat, but failures in the development of the missile led the Indian Navy to fit the Barak-1 missile instead.

The ship underwent a fourth refit in Indian service from January to August 2009 at Cochin Shipyard, Kochi. The refit was expected to ensure her continued service in the Indian Navy until 2015, and the ship went through exercises in the Arabian Sea for a month and a half before being deployed to the Gulf of Aden. Navy officers later reported that the carrier might be kept in service until 2020, as two Indigenous Aircraft Carriers (IACs) seemed likely to be fully operational by then. On 12 July 2011, the ship arrived at Cochin shipyard for a short refit scheduled to be completed in two months and it was repainted. Indian Navy indicated that the ship could remain in service until 2020, provided that there are still Sea Harriers available for ship-borne operations.

On 2 November 2012, the ship arrived in Kochi for the first part of a major two-phase refit. In the first phase, the hull was cleaned, probed for corrosion, worn hull plates were reinforced and received a fresh coat of corrosion-resistant paint. The carrier sailed to Mumbai for further upgrades to her machinery before rejoining the fleet in the summer of 2013. The refit would enable her to serve through 2016 and was the final major refit before her decommissioning. In August–September 2015, the ship underwent a short refit to reinforce her hull and inspection before her participation in the International Fleet Review in February 2016.

=== Decommissioning ===
By 2013, Viraat's age and cost of maintenance prompted the navy to begin the process to obtain Defence Ministry clearance for her decommissioning; in December 2014, a review board was established to determine the ship's continued service life.

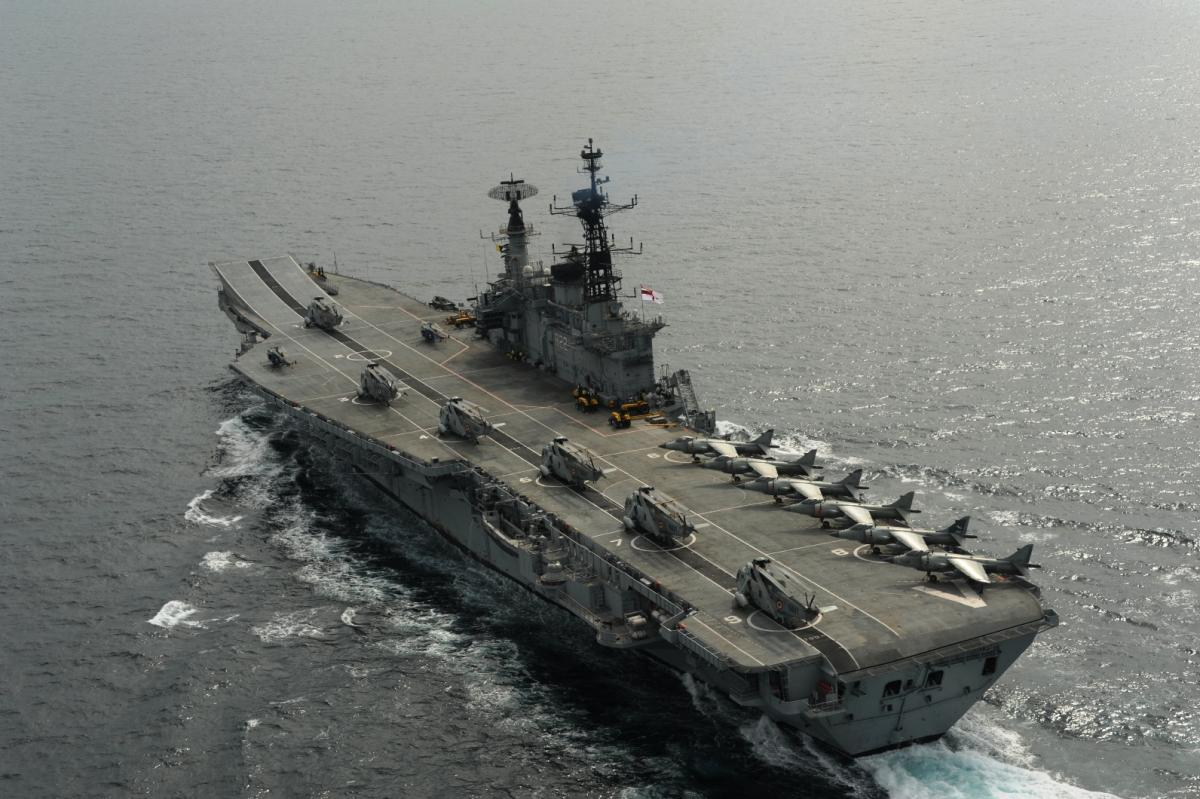
INS Viraat prior to retirement

In February 2015, the navy announced plans to decommission the ship in 2016 and began the process to obtain Defence Ministry clearance for the carrier's decommissioning. On 23 July 2016, Viraat sailed from Mumbai to Kochi for the last time under her own steam; by then, she had spent a total of 2,250 days at sea and had steamed a total of 1,094,215 kilometers. At Kochi, she underwent a month-long deactivation in preparation for decommissioning; during this period, her boilers, engines, propellers and rudders were removed. Deactivation was completed on 4 September, and the carrier was towed back to Mumbai on 23 October for her formal decommissioning ceremony. Viraat arrived in Mumbai on 28 October and was laid up. On 6 March 2017, she was decommissioned. Viraat was formally decommissioned on 6 March 2017. Her weapons systems and operational equipment were to have been removed by mid-2017.

== Preservation plans ==
In July 2015, it was announced that the ship would be transferred to the Government of Andhra Pradesh for conversion into a museum ship at a cost of ₹20 crore (US$2 million); Chandrababu Naidu, the chief minister of Andhra Pradesh, confirmed the plans on 8 February 2016. By April 2016, however, the plans had apparently fallen through. A British businessman's proposal to preserve the ship failed when its crowdfunding campaign failed to make a tenth of its goal and it was stated that if Viraat was not to be preserved, she would be scrapped.

On 1 November 2018 the Maharashtra cabinet approved the conversion of Viraat into India's first moored maritime museum and marine adventure centre, to be located near Nivati, Sindhudurg district. This proposal, which included a hotel, did not attract tenders because of high cost, and the state government abandoned it in November 2019.

After an expert committee determined Viraat 's structural deterioration made her preservation unviable, the union government decided to scrap her and held an online auction; in July 2020, Gujarat-based shipping firm Shri Ram Shipping purchased the ship from the Metal Scrap Corporation for ₹38.54 crore (US$4 million). She was scheduled to be dismantled at Alang starting in September 2020. On 19 September 2020, Viraat was towed from her berth at the Mumbai Naval Dockyard to the scrappers at Alang in the Bhavnagar district of Gujarat, reaching the port at Alang on the evening of 22 September.

On 28 September, Viraat was beached at Alang. At the end of September, a private Mumbai-registered company, Envitech Marine Consultants Private Limited, offered to purchase the ship from Shree Ram Shipping and preserve her as a museum and tourist centre, to be provisionally berthed at Goa. The Goa state government gave its support provided the project was approved by the Ministry of Defence, the necessary clearances were obtained and the state would incur no financial obligations. Shree Ram Shipping offered to sell Viraat to Envitech for ₹100 crore (US$11 million), provided the firm receive the clearances and assume all cost and risk. Discussions were in progress as of 1 October.

On 10 February 2021 a Supreme Court hearing stayed the dismantling of the ship. The Court heard that Envitech proposed to purchase the ship for RS 100 cr and sought responses from Shree Ram Shipping and the Ministry of Defence. On 10 April 2021, the Supreme Court informed counsel for Envitech that INS Viraat had already become private property of Shree Ram Group; who had testified that 40% of the ship had already been broken, and on 12 April 2021 the petition was dismissed saying it was too late since 40% of the ship had been dismantled.

There is a plan to have two of INS Viraat's anchors displayed at the Port Museum in Alappuzha, which is being developed.

== Gallery ==
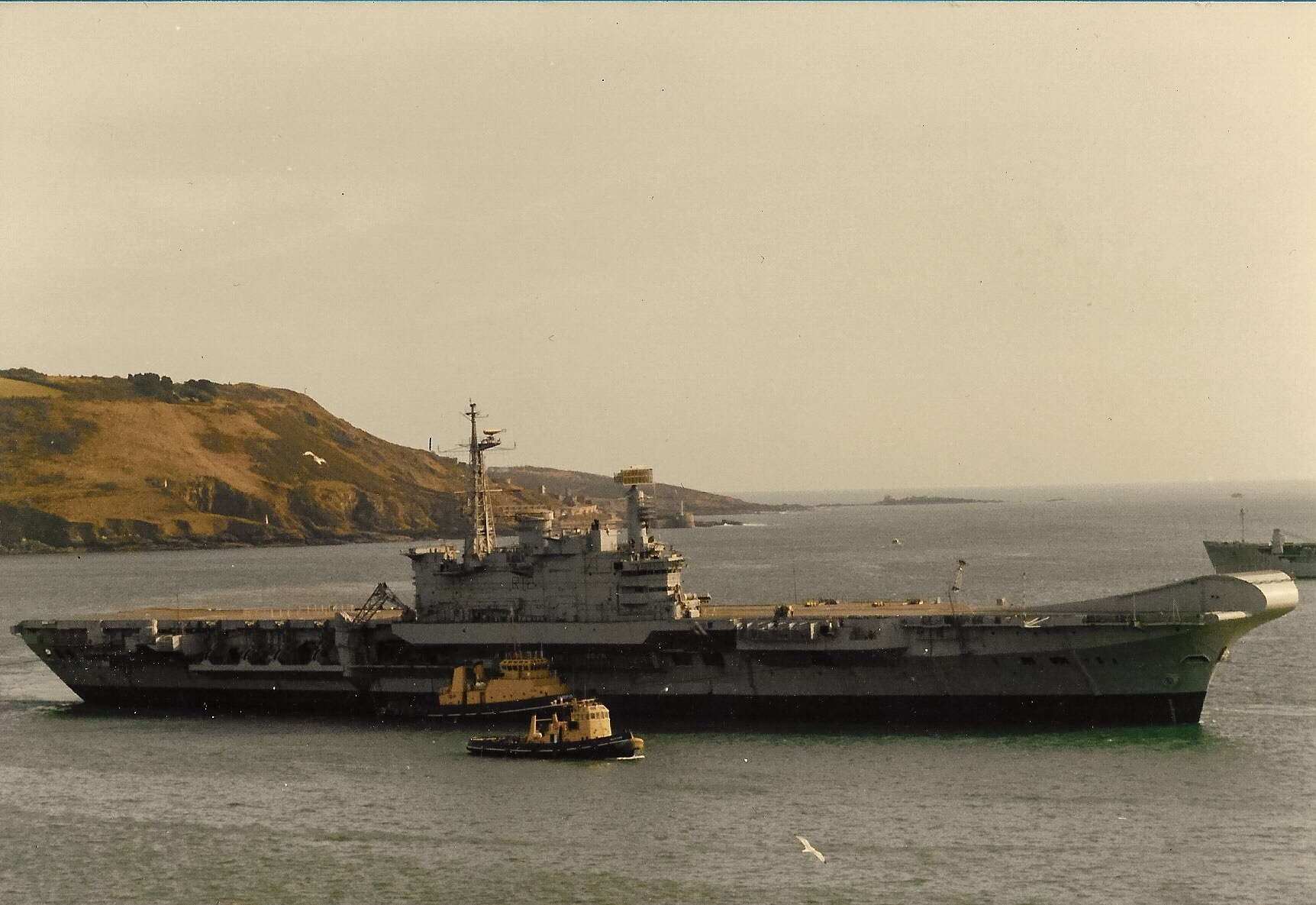
Hermes enters Devonport Dockyard to begin a refit following her purchase by India

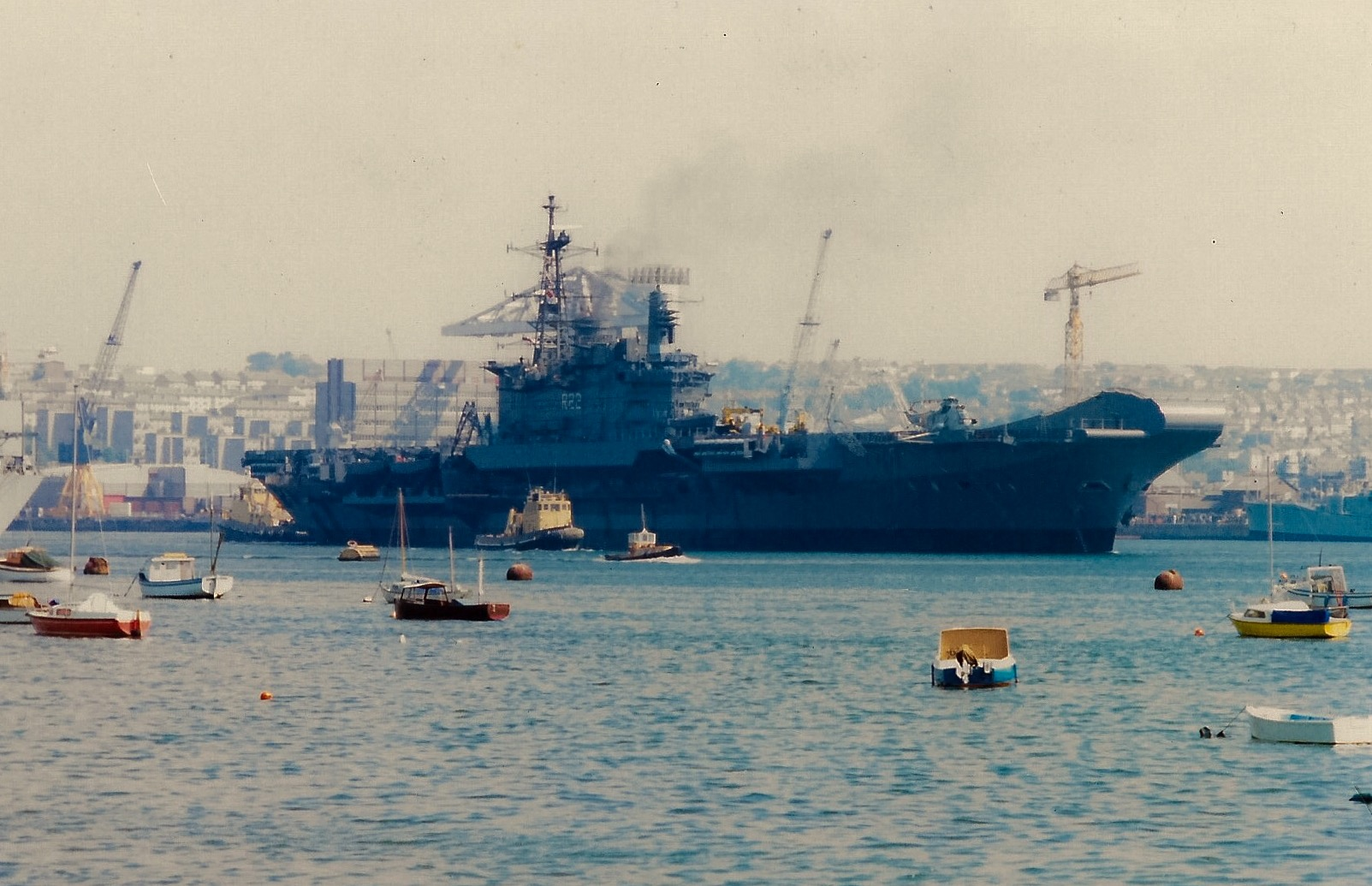
Viraat departs Devonport on her delivery voyage to India.

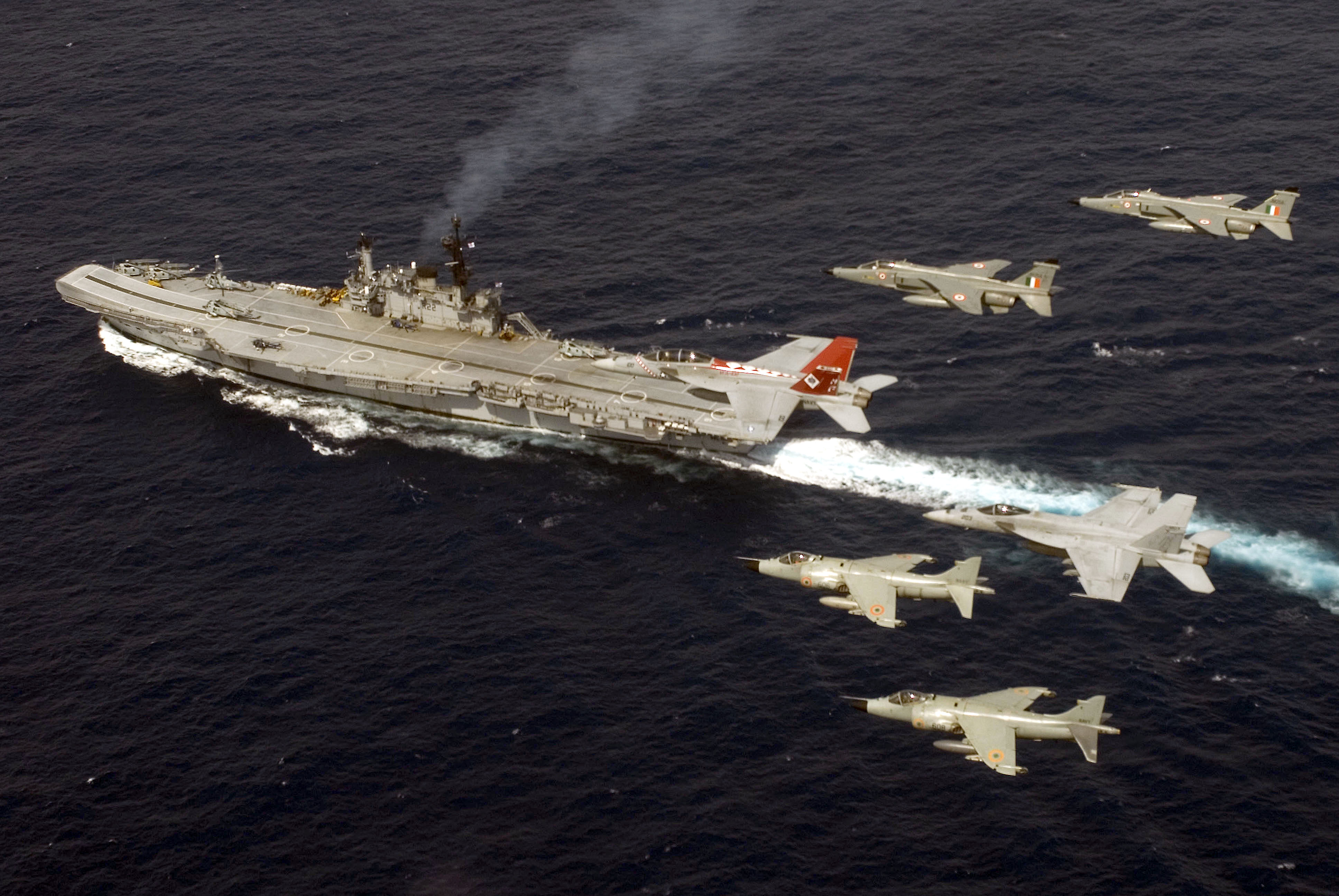
Indian Navy Sea Harriers and Indian Air Force SEPECAT Jaguars with US Navy F/A-18 Super Hornets flying over INS Viraat

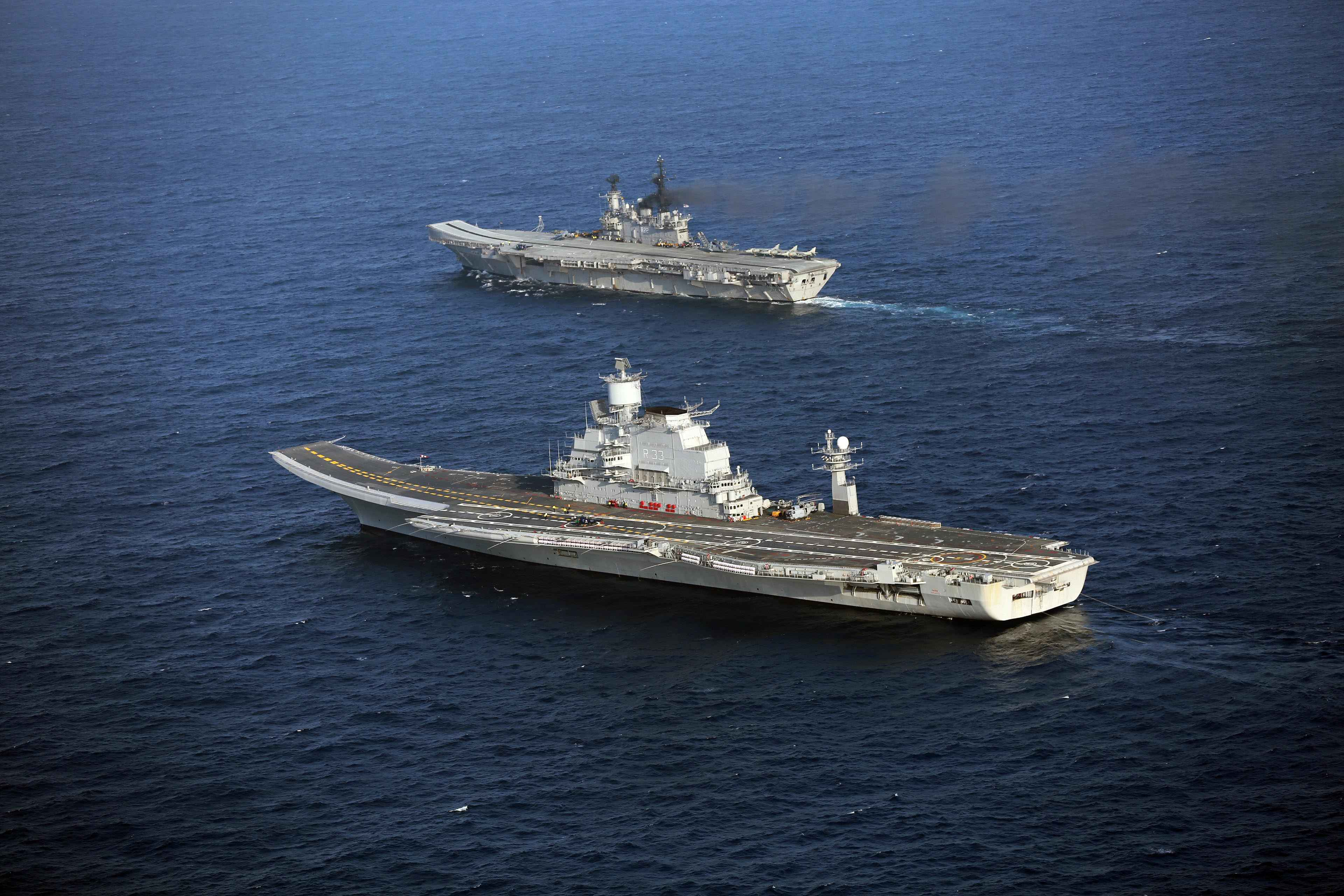
INS Viraat (top) escorting the Indian Navy's newly acquired aircraft carrier Vikramaditya during the latter's delivery voyage

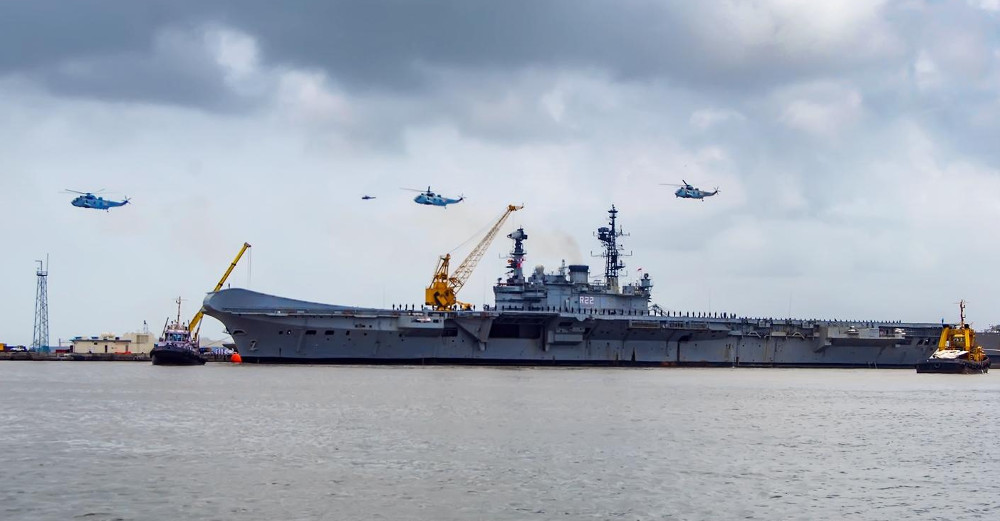
Viraat departs Mumbai under her own power for the last time in July 2016 en route to Kochi.

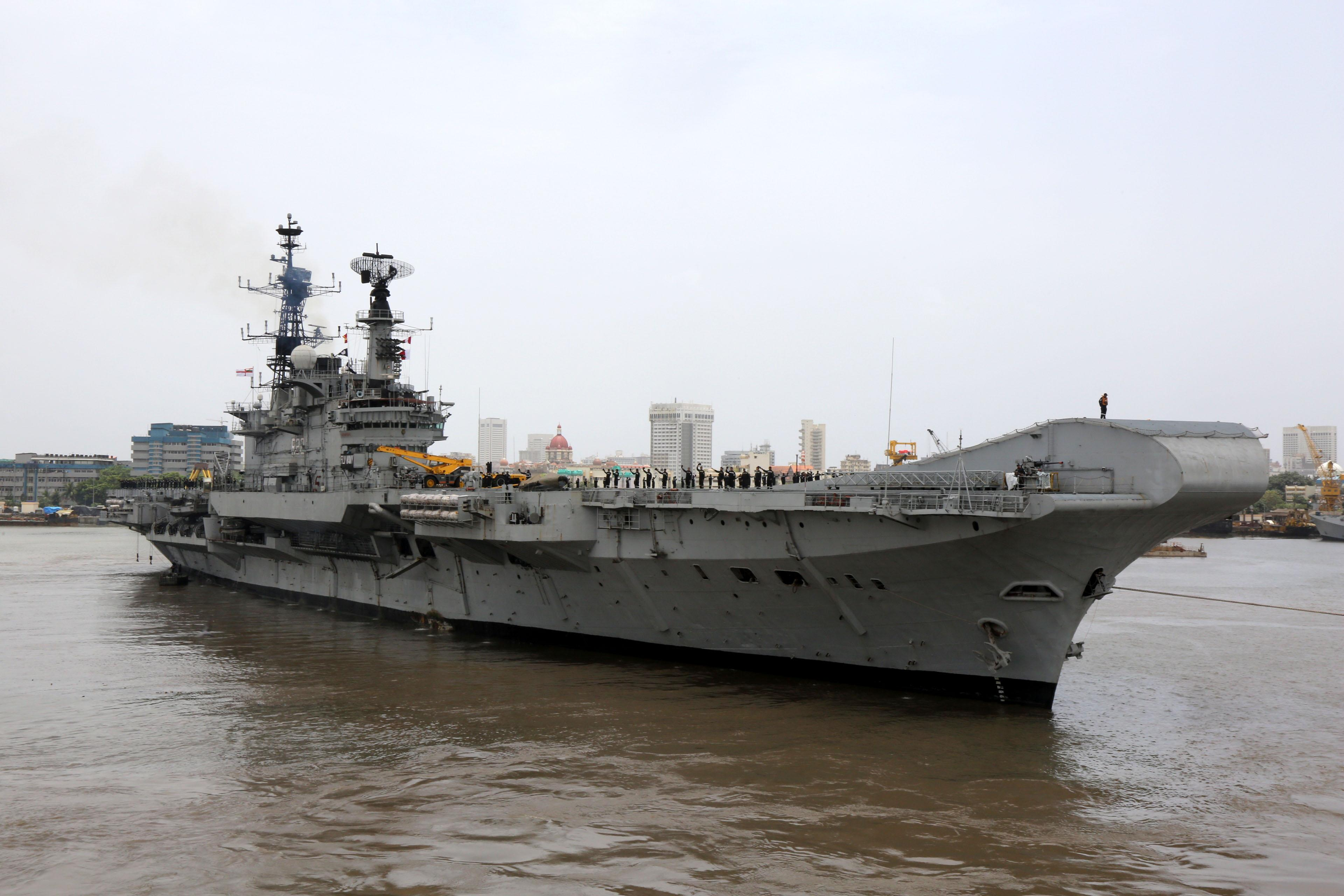
INS Viraat sails under her own steam for the last time.

== Commanding officers ==
S.No	Name	Assumed office	Left office	Notes
1	Captain Vinod Pasricha NM	12 May 1987	15 December 1988	Commissioning CO. Later Flag Officer Commanding-in-Chief Eastern Naval Command and Flag Officer Commanding-in-Chief Western Naval Command.
2	Captain Madhvendra Singh	15 December 1988	30 August 1990	Later Chief of the Naval Staff.
3	Captain Arun Prakash VrC VSM	30 August 1990	26 December 1991	Later Chief of the Naval Staff.
4	Captain Madanjit Singh	26 December 1991	21 March 1993	Later Flag Officer Commanding-in-Chief Southern Naval Command and Flag Officer Commanding-in-Chief Western Naval Command.
5	Captain Yashwant Prasad	21 March 1993	28 September 1994	Later Flag Officer Commanding-in-Chief Southern Naval Command.
6	Captain Jagjit Singh Bedi VSM	28 September 1994	13 October 1995	Later Flag Officer Commanding-in-Chief Southern Naval Command.
7	Captain Vijay Shankar	13 October 1995	8 November 1996	Later Commander-in-Chief, Strategic Forces Command and Commander-in-Chief, Andaman and Nicobar Command.
8	Captain Nirmal Kumar Verma	8 November 1996	13 December 1997	Later Chief of the Naval Staff.
9	Captain S. K. Damle NM VSM	13 December 1997	15 June 2000	Later Flag Officer Commanding-in-Chief Southern Naval Command.
10	Captain R. F. Contractor	15 June 2000	18 December 2001	Later Director General of the Indian Coast Guard.
11	Captain Devendra Kumar Joshi NM VSM	18 December 2001	7 January 2003	Later Chief of the Naval Staff.
12	Captain Anil Chopra	7 January 2003	6 January 2004	Later Flag Officer Commanding-in-Chief Eastern Naval Command and Flag Officer Commanding-in-Chief Western Naval Command.
13	Captain Pradeep Chauhan	6 January 2004	31 May 2005	Later Commandant of Indian Naval Academy.
14	Captain Surinder Pal Singh Cheema NM	6 January 2004	31 May 2005	Later Flag Officer Commanding-in-Chief Western Naval Command.
15	Captain Girish Luthra	31 May 2005	1 August 2007	Later Flag Officer Commanding-in-Chief Western Naval Command.
16	Captain Abhay Raghunath Karve	1 August 2007	27 December 2008	Later Flag Officer Commanding-in-Chief Southern Naval Command.
17	Captain Anil Kumar Chawla	27 December 2008	6 August 2010	Later Flag Officer Commanding-in-Chief Southern Naval Command.
18	Captain R. Hari Kumar	6 August 2010	15 November 2011	Later Chief of the Naval Staff.
19	Captain Ajendra Bahadur Singh	15 November 2011	1 June 2013	Later Flag Officer Commanding-in-Chief Western Naval Command.
20	Captain Biswajit Dasgupta	1 June 2013	1 June 2015	Later Flag Officer Commanding-in-Chief Eastern Naval Command.
21	Captain Rajesh Pendharkar	1 June 2015	13 July 2016	Later Flag Officer Commanding-in-Chief Eastern Naval Command.
22	Captain Puneet Chadha	13 July 2016	26 February 2017	Later Additional Director General of the National Cadet Corps.

== See also ==
- List of aircraft carriers
- INS Vikrant (1961)
- INS Vikramaditya
