= M. A. Hampiholi =

Indian admiral

Vice Admiral M A Hampiholi PVSM, AVSM, NM
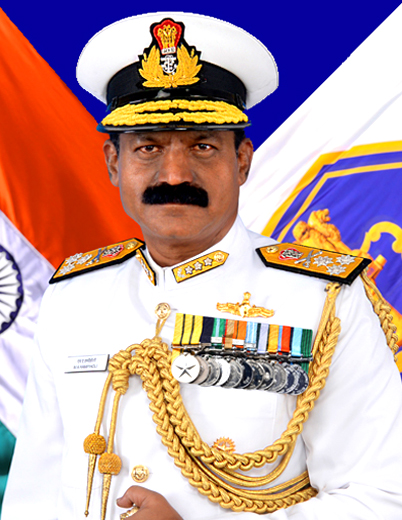
- Military career
- Allegiance: India
- Branch: Indian Navy
- Service years: 1 July 1985 - 31 December 2023
- Rank: Vice Admiral
- Service number: 02859-Y
- Commands: Southern Naval Command; Indian Naval Academy; Western Fleet; INS Mandovi; Mauritius Coast Guard; INS Talwar (F40); INS Magar (L20); INS Nashak (K83)
- Awards: Param Vishisht Seva Medal; Ati Vishisht Seva Medal; Nao Sena Medal

Vice Admiral Makarand Aravind Hampiholi, PVSM, AVSM, NM is a former flag officer in the Indian Navy. He last served as the Flag Officer Commanding-in-Chief, Southern Naval Command. Previously, he served as the Commandant of Indian Naval Academy and served as the Director General Naval Operations (DGNO) at Naval headquarters.

== Early life ==
Hampiholi was born in Dharwad in Karnataka. He attended the Sainik School, Bijapur. He graduated from the National Defence Academy in 1983 with the President's gold medal.

== Naval career ==
Hampiholi was commissioned into the Indian Navy in the Executive branch on 1 July 1985. He is a specialist in Anti-submarine warfare. He has completed the staff course at the Defence Services Staff College (DSSC) in Wellington Cantonment and the higher command course at the Naval War College, Goa. He has also attended the National Defence College, New Delhi.

In the early years of his career, he served as an ASW specialist aboard the Nilgiri-class frigate INS Himgiri (F34), the Abhay-class corvette INS Agray and the Godavari-class frigate INS Ganga (F22).

Hampiholi has commanded the Veer-class missile vessel INS Nashak (K83), the Magar-class amphibious warfare vessel INS Magar (L20) and the Talwar-class guided missile frigate INS Talwar (F40). He has also served as the Second-in-command of the Khukri-class corvette INS Khukri (P49). During his command of INS Talwar, he was conferred the Nausena Medal (Devotion to Duty).

He also commanded the National Coast Guard of Mauritius from 2003 to 2005. From June 2007 to June 2009, Hampiholi served as the Commandant of the Naval Academy and the Commanding Officer of Naval base INS Mandovi.

He has tenanted the instructional appointments of Instructor at the Anti Submarine Warfare School, Kochi and that of Senior Directing Staff at the Naval War College, Goa. Hampiholi, in his staff appointments, has served as the Joint Director of Personnel at Naval HQ, Naval Assistant to the Flag Officer Commanding-in-Chief Eastern Naval Command. He also served as the Principal Director Staff Requirements at Naval HQ.

=== Flag rank ===
On promotion to Flag Rank, Hampiholi took over as the Assistant Chief of Personnel (Human Resource Development) (ACOP HRD). The ACOP is an assistant principal staff officer appointment at naval headquarters. He then assumed the office of Flag Officer Sea Training (FOST) at Kochi. As FOST, his charter included the conduct of the operational sea training of all ships of the Indian Navy and the Indian Coast Guard.

On 22 January 2018, Hampiholi assumed the office of the Flag Officer Commanding Western Fleet. For his command of the Western Fleet, Hampiholi was awarded the Ati Vishisht Seva Medal on 26 January 2019. Hampiholi took over as the Director General Naval Operations on promotion to the rank of Vice Admiral on 27 March 2019. On 27 July 2020, he assumed office as the Commandant of Indian Naval Academy.

After an eighteen-month long tenure, Hampiholi was appointed Flag Officer Commanding-in-Chief Southern Naval Command and took over on 30 November 2021. He superannuated on 31 December 2023 and was succeeded by Vice Admiral Vennam Srinivas.

== Awards and decorations ==
Hampiholi was awarded the Nao Sena Medal in 2011, the Ati Vishisht Seva Medal in 2019 and the Param Vishisht Seva Medal in 2023.

Param Vishisht Seva Medal	Ati Vishisht Seva Medal	Nau Sena Medal	Samanya Seva Medal
Operation Parakram Medal	Sainya Seva Medal	Videsh Seva Medal	75th Anniversary of Independence Medal
50th Anniversary of Independence Medal	30 Years Long Service Medal	20 Years Long Service Medal	9 Years Long Service Medal

== Gallery ==
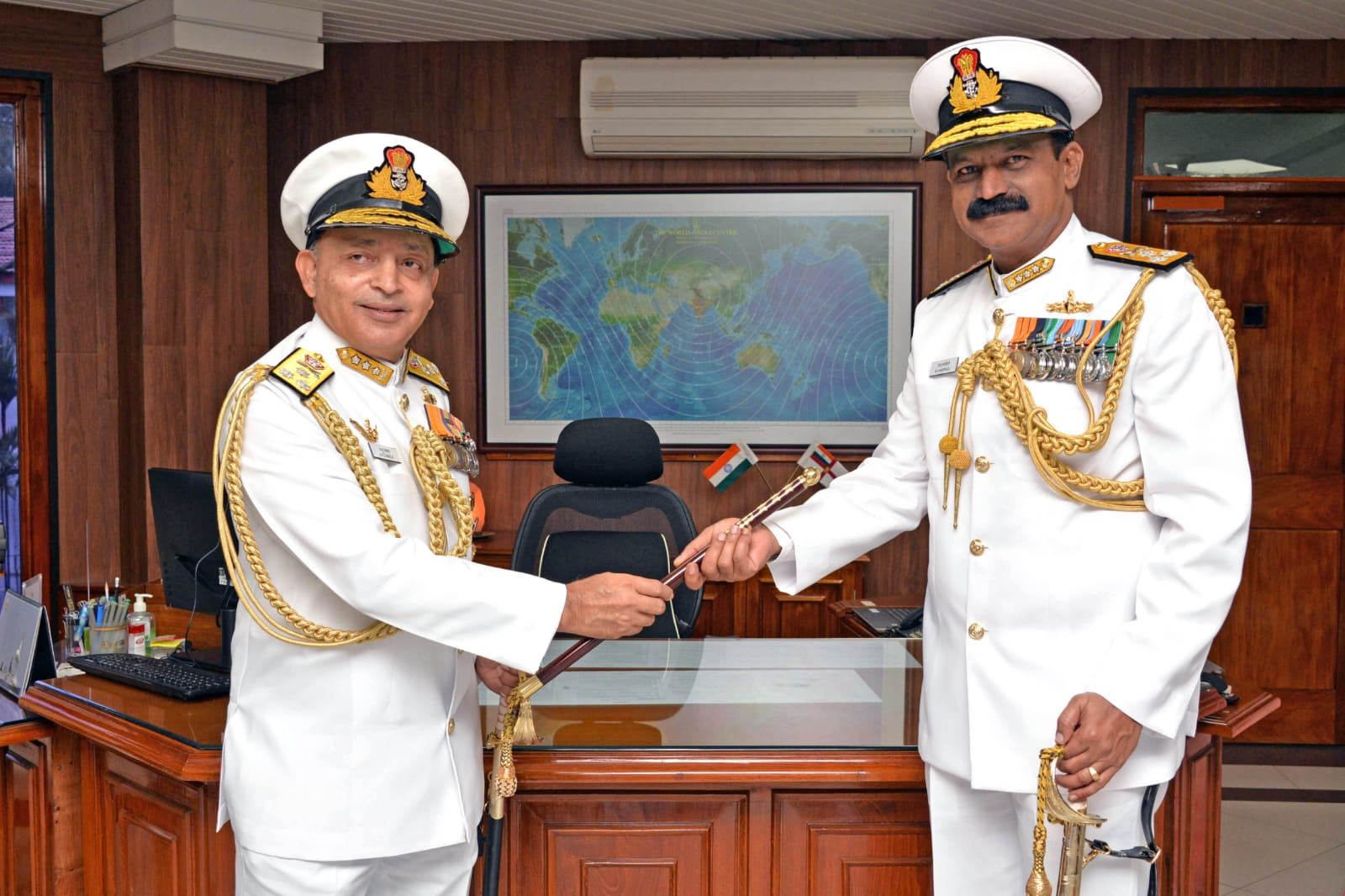
Vice Admiral Anil Kumar Chawla handing over the charge of Southern Naval Command to Vice Admiral M A Hampiholi.

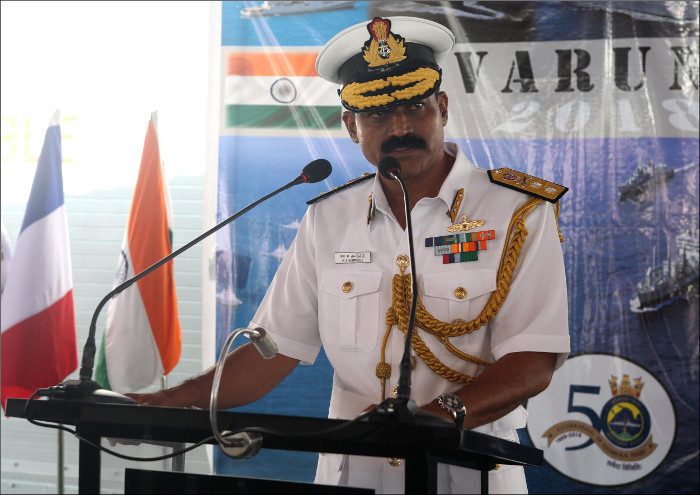
RAdm Hampiholi as FOCWF during Ex Varuna 2018

== See also ==
- Flag Officer Commanding Western Fleet
- Western Fleet
- Commandant of Indian Naval Academy

Military offices
Preceded by N N Rao	Commandant of Indian Naval Academy; 2007 - 2008	Succeeded by M P Muralidharan
Preceded by S. K. Grewal	Flag Officer Sea Training; 2016 - 2018	Succeeded by Sanjay Jasjit Singh
Preceded by R. B. Pandit	Flag Officer Commanding Western Fleet; 2018 - 2019	Succeeded by Sanjay Jasjit Singh
Preceded by Satishkumar Namdeo Ghormade	Director General Naval Operations; 2019 - 2020	Succeeded by Dinesh K Tripathi
Preceded by Dinesh K Tripathi	Commandant, Indian Naval Academy; 2020 - 29 November 2021	Succeeded by Puneet Kumar Bahl
Preceded by Anil Kumar Chawla	Flag Officer Commanding-in-Chief, Southern Naval Command; 30 November 2021 - 31 December 2023	Succeeded by Vennam Srinivas
