= G. S. Kapoor =

Indian navy commodore

Commodore G. S. Kapoor AVSM
- Born: 18 June 1915; British India
- Died: 8 July 2001 (aged 86); Chelsea and Westminster Hospital, Chelsea, London, England, United Kingdom
- Military career
- Allegiance: British Raj; India
- Branch: Royal Navy; Royal Indian Navy; Indian Navy
- Service years: 1936–1967
- Rank: Commodore
- Commands: Cochin Command; Commodore East Coast; Chief of Personnel; 11th Destroyer Squadron (INS Rajput); Chief of Administration; INS Ranjit
- Conflicts: World War II
- Awards: Ati Vishisht Seva Medal

Commodore Gyan Sarup Kapoor AVSM (18 June 1915 – 8 July 2001) was a senior Indian Navy commander.

== Early career ==
Kapoor joined the Royal Indian Navy (RIN) as a cadet in 1935, and was commissioned a midshipman on 1 September 1936. He was appointed a sub-lieutenant on 24 July 1937, and was assigned to the sloop HMIS Clive on 1 November. On 21 December, he transferred to the sloop HMIS Indus, then captained by Commander Arthur Rullion Rattray. He was then posted to the RIN Boys' Training Establishment aboard the depot ship HMIS Dalhousie with effect from 1 October 1938.

Promoted lieutenant on 24 July 1940, Kapoor returned to Indus on 7 August. He was assigned to HMIS Jumna on 24 July 1941. On 7 July 1944, he was posted to HMIS Valsura, and was promoted acting lieutenant-commander on 31 December 1944.

== Post-Independence ==
Following Indian independence, Kapoor was promoted acting commander (substantive lieutenant-commander) on 30 June 1948. He then travelled to the United Kingdom to take command of the former Royal Navy destroyer HMS Redoubt, which had been transferred to the Indian Navy as part of its first destroyer flotilla; Redoubt would be recommissioned as INS Ranjit. He was promoted captain on 30 September 1950 and served as Chief of Administration at Naval HQ from October 1950 until September 1952, when he was appointed Naval Adviser to the High Commissioner of India to the United Kingdom. He took up his appointment in January 1953, succeeding Captain A. K. Chatterji, and served in London until October 1955, when he assumed command of the 11th Destroyer Squadron as captain of INS Rajput.

On 18 February 1957, Kapoor was promoted commodore (2nd class) and assumed charge as Chief of Personnel (COP), serving until 20 November 1959. While serving as COP, he was appointed president of the Services Sport Control Board (SSCB) on 3 April 1958. On 5 February 1960, Kapoor was appointed Commodore East Coast (COMEAST), Visakhapatnam, serving in this capacity until 18 June 1962, when he assumed command as Commodore-in-Charge, Cochin (COMCHIN). He relinquished this command on 21 December 1965, but remained on the active list of the Navy until 26 December 1967. Kapoor was awarded the Ati Vishisht Seva Medal (AVSM) in the 1967 Republic Day decorations list. Following his retirement from the Navy, he served as Director-General of Lighthouses and Lightships during the 1970s.

Military offices
Preceded by R. S. David	Commodore-in-Charge Cochin; 1962–1965	Succeeded by J. D. Mody
Preceded by M. K. Heble	Commodore East Coast; 1960–1962	Succeeded by J. S. Mehra
Preceded by S. M. Nanda	Chief of Personnel; 1957–1959	Succeeded by K. R. Nair
Preceded by S. G. Karmarkar	Chief of Administration; 1950–1952	Succeeded by M. K. Heble
