= Anil Kumar Chawla =

Retired Indian Navy Officer

Vice Admiral Anil Kumar Chawla PVSM, AVSM, NM, VSM, ADC
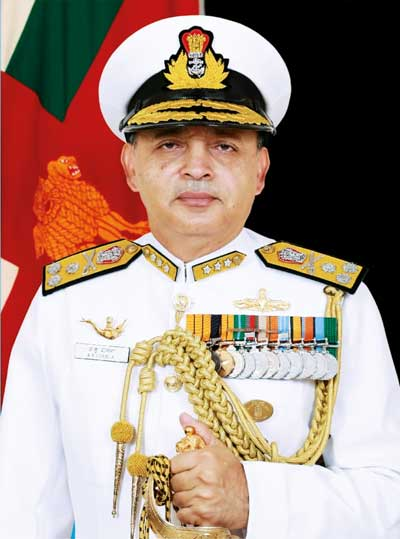
- Military career
- Allegiance: India
- Branch: Indian Navy
- Service years: 1982 – 30 November 2021
- Rank: Vice Admiral
- Commands: Southern Naval Command; Western Fleet; INS Viraat; INS Tabar; INS Vinash; INS Kora
- Awards: Param Vishisht Seva Medal; Ati Vishisht Seva Medal; Vishisht Seva Medal; Nausena Medal

Vice Admiral Anil Kumar Chawla, PVSM, AVSM, NM, VSM, ADC is a retired Indian Navy officer, who served as Flag Officer Commanding-in-Chief Southern Naval Command. He assumed charge on 30 July 2018 succeeding Vice Admiral Abhay Raghunath Karve. He superannuated on 30 November 2021 and was succeeded by Vice Admiral M.A. Hampiholi

== Career ==
Vice Admiral Chawla joined the Navy in 1982 and has commanded INS Vinash, INS Kora, INS Tabar and INS Viraat.

He commanded the Western Fleet from 16 August 2013 to 1 October 2014 before being promoted to vice admiral and appointed as the director general naval operations on 31 December 2014.

He served as chief of personnel, Indian Navy from 28 May 2016 to 30 July 2018.

He superannuated on 30 November 2021.

== Military awards and decorations ==

| Param Vishisht Seva Medal | Ati Vishisht Seva Medal | Nausena Medal | Vishisht Seva Medal |
| Samanya Seva medal | Special Service Medal | Operation Parakram Medal | Sainya Seva Medal |
| Videsh Seva Medal | 50th Anniversary of Independence Medal | | 30 Years Long Service Medal |
| | 20 Years Long Service Medal | 9 Years Long Service Medal | |

Military offices
| Preceded by Abhay Raghunath Karve | Flag Officer Commanding-in-Chief Southern Naval Command; 30 July 2018 – 30 November 2021 | Succeeded by M. A. Hampiholi |
| Preceded by Abhay Raghunath Karve | Chief of personnel 28 May 2016 – 30 July 2018 | Succeeded by R. Hari Kumar |
| Preceded by Girish Luthra | Director general naval operations 1 January 2015 - 27 May 2016 | Succeeded by Satishkumar Namdeo Ghormade |
| Preceded by Abhay Raghunath Karve | Flag officer commanding Western Fleet; 15 August 2013 – 30 September 2014 | Succeeded by R. Hari Kumar |
| Preceded by Abhay Raghunath Karve | Commanding officer INS Viraat; 27 December 2008 – 6 August 2010 | Succeeded by R. Hari Kumar |
