= Satishkumar Namdeo Ghormade =

Vice-Admiral in the Indian Navy

Vice Admiral Satishkumar Namdeo Ghormade PVSM, AVSM, NM, ADC
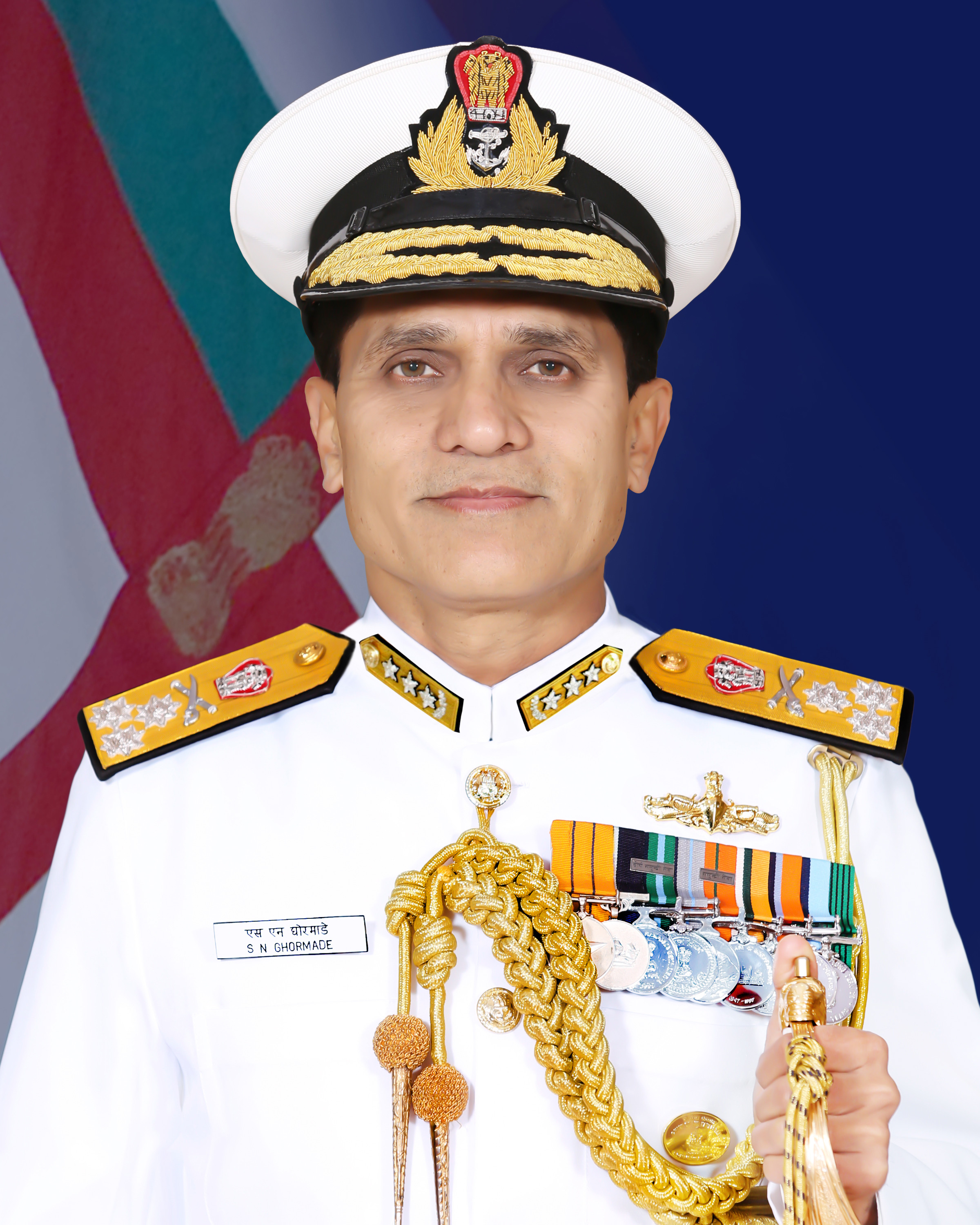
- Allegiance: India
- Branch: Indian Navy
- Service years: 1 January 1984 – 31 March 2023
- Rank: Vice Admiral
- Commands: INS Brahmaputra; INS Nireekshak; INS Allepey; INS Ganga
- Awards: Param Vishisht Seva Medal; Ati Vishisht Seva Medal; Nau Sena Medal; ADC

Vice Admiral Satishkumar Namdeo Ghormade PVSM, AVSM, NM, ADC is a retired officer of the Indian Navy. He served as the 36th Vice Chief of the Naval Staff. Previously, he served as the Deputy Chief of Integrated Defence Staff (Operations and Training), Controller of Personnel Services at Naval HQ and as the Chief of Staff of the Eastern Naval Command.

== Early life and education ==
SN Ghormade, an alumnus of Rashtriya Military School Bangalore (an elite class military boarding school) graduated from the National Defence Academy (NDA), Pune. He completed his Master of Philosophy degree from University of Mumbai, and a Master of Science degree from the University of Madras in defence and strategic studies. He completed the Naval Staff Course at the Naval War College in Newport, Rhode Island, United States, and the Naval War College in Mumbai. Ghormade holds a specialization in navigation and direction. He completed his personnel management Master's degree from the Symbiosis Institute of Business.

== Career ==
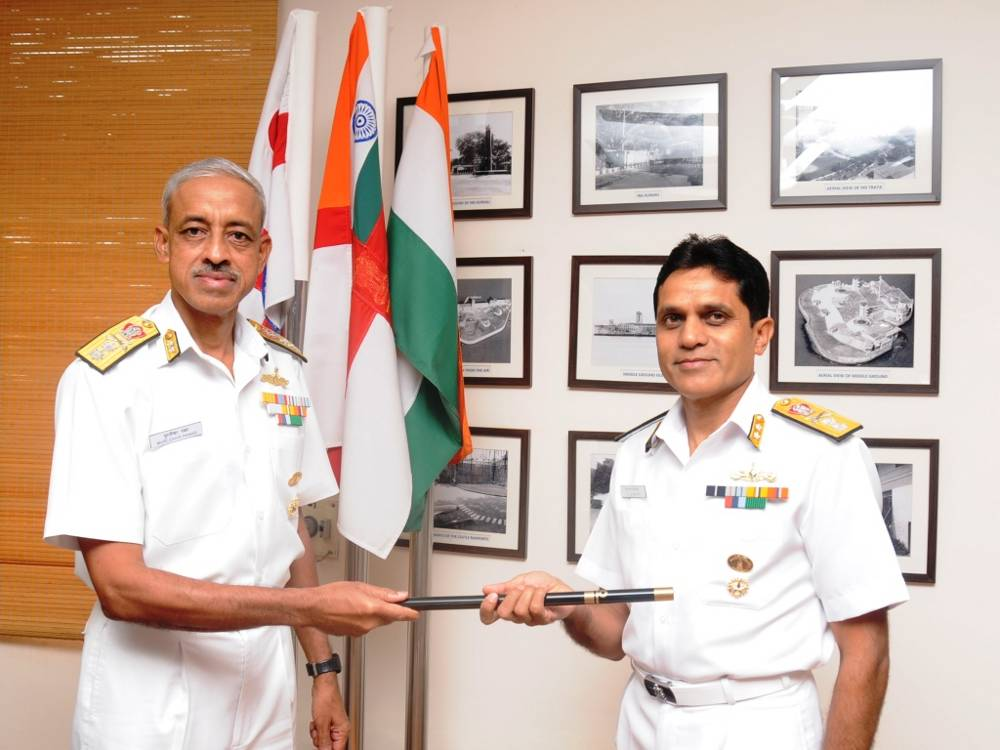
RAdm Ghormade (right), assuming charge of Flag Officer Maharashtra Area, from RAdm MS Pawar

Ghormade was commissioned into the Indian Navy on 1 January 1984. He was the commanding officer of the guided missile frigate Brahmaputra, the submarine rescue vessel Nireekshak and the minesweeper Allepey, and was also second in command of the guided missile frigate Ganga.

Ghormade served as Principal Director of the Personnel Board and Director of Naval Plans at Naval Headquarters. He also served as Director of Military Affairs at the Ministry of External Affairs. He held two instructional appointments: one at the Navigation Direction School and the other at the National Defence Academy.

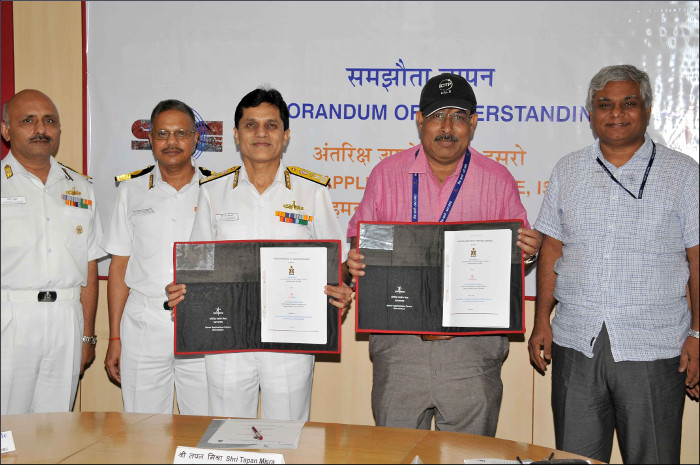
VAdm Ghormade (second from left), NM, DGNO and Mr Tapan Misra (third from left), Director, Space Application Centre (SAC)

=== Flag rank ===
After promotion to the flag rank in 2012, he was appointed Assistant Chief of Personnel. Ghormade served as Flag Officer Commanding Karnataka Naval Area, and Flag Officer Commanding Maharashtra Naval Area.

Beginning on 21 October 2016, Ghormade served as Director General Naval Operations and then took charge as Chief of Staff Eastern Naval Command. During his tenure as Director General Naval Operations, a memorandum of understanding (MoU) was signed on 15 May 2017 with the Space Applications Centre for the sharing of oceanographic and meteorological data. This will allow for a better understanding of the Indian Ocean.

== Military awards and decorations ==
He was awarded the Commendation Card by the Chief of Naval Staff in 2000, the Nau Sena Medal in 2007, the Ati Vishisht Seva Medal on 26 January 2017 and the Param Vishisht Seva Medal in January 2022.

| Param Vishisht Seva Medal | Ati Vishisht Seva Medal | Nau Sena Medal | Samanya Seva Medal |
| Operation Vijay Medal | Sainya Seva Medal | 75th Anniversary of Independence Medal | 50th Anniversary of Independence Medal |
| 30 Years Long Service Medal | 20 Years Long Service Medal | | 9 Years Long Service Medal |

Military offices
| Preceded by C. S. Murthy | Flag Officer Commanding Karnataka Naval Area; 2015 - 2015 | Succeeded by Ravindra Jayant Nadkarni |
| Preceded by Murlidhar Sadashiv Pawar | Flag Officer Commanding Maharashtra Naval Area; 2015 - 2016 | Succeeded by Sanjay Mahindru |
| Preceded by Anil Kumar Chawla | Director General Naval Operations; 2016 - 2019 | Succeeded by M. A. Hampiholi |
| Preceded by Biswajit Dasgupta | Controller of Personnel Services; 2020 - 2021 | Succeeded by Sanjay Jasjit Singh |
| Preceded by G. Ashok Kumar | Vice Chief of Naval Staff; 31 July 2021 - 31 March 2023 | Succeeded by Sanjay Jasjit Singh |
