= INS Dweeprakshak =

Naval base in India

- Kavaratti, Lakshadweep Islands

Site information
- Type: Naval station
- Controlled by: Indian Navy

Site history
- Built: 2012
- In use: 2012–present

Garrison information
- Occupants: Southern Naval Command

INS Dweeprakshak is a naval base of the Southern Naval Command of the Indian Navy located on Kavaratti island in the Lakshadweep archipelago. It was commissioned on 30 April 2012.

== History ==
The Indian Navy has deployed detachments to the Lakshadweep Islands since independence. The Lakshadweep islands were a part of the Madras Presidency under the British Raj and in accordance with the Indian Independence Act 1947, enacted by the British parliament, the islands were transferred to the new Union of India. Though the Madras Presidency had an overwhelming Hindu majority, the islands had a Muslim majority. Hence, it seemed possible that the new dominion of Pakistan might seek to lay claim to the islands. On the orders of Vallabhbhai Patel, the first Home Minister and Deputy Prime Minister of India, a ship of the Royal Indian Navy was sent to the islands to hoist the Indian national flag and ensure the islands' integration into the Union of India. Hours after the arrival of the Indian ship, vessels of the Royal Pakistan Navy were seen near the islands, but after observing Indian naval presence they returned to Karachi.

The navy has maintained permanent facilities on Kavaratti island since the 1980s. The islands are en route on vital shipping lanes from the Indian mainland to the Persian Gulf. With increasing threats, such as attacks by Somali pirates, the island territory has grown in relevance to Indian security considerations. INS Dweeprakshak was hence commissioned to provide support facilities for naval vessels based on the islands, as well as to enhance surveillance capabilities over shipping lanes.

INS Dweeprakshak was commissioned on 30 April 2012 by Vice Admiral Krishnan Nair Sushil, Flag Officer Commanding-in-Chief (FOC-in-C) of the Southern Naval Command. Captain S. M. Hanchinal was the first Commanding Officer of the base.

== See also ==
Indian navy

- List of Indian Navy bases
- List of active Indian Navy ships

Integrated commands and units

- Armed Forces Special Operations Division
- Defence Cyber Agency
- Integrated Defence Staff
- Integrated Space Cell
- Indian Nuclear Command Authority
- Indian Armed Forces
- Special Forces of India

Other lists

- Strategic Forces Command
- List of Indian Air Force stations
- List of Indian Navy bases
- India's overseas military bases
