= Benjamin Abraham Samson =

Indian military officer (1916–2008)

Vice Admiral B A Samson PVSM
- Born: 25 September 1916; Poona, Bombay Presidency, British Raj (now in Maharashtra, India)
- Died: 18 March 2008 (aged 91); Chennai, Tamil Nadu, India
- Relatives: Leela Samson (daughter)
- Military career
- Allegiance: British Raj; India
- Branch: Royal Indian Navy; Indian Navy
- Service years: 1931–1966
- Rank: Vice Admiral
- Nickname: Chippy
- Commands: Indian Fleet; INS Delhi (C74); HMIS Sutlej (U95); HMIS Jumna (U21); HMIS Prabhavati
- Conflicts: World War II
- Awards: Param Vishisht Seva Medal
- Other work: CEO, Mazagon Dock Shipbuilders; Chairman, CII; Philips India; Vice Chairman, Damodar Bulk Carriers

Vice Admiral Benjamin Abraham 'Chippy' Samson, PVSM (25 September 1916 – 18 March 2008) was an Indian Navy Admiral who served as the Flag Officer Commanding Indian Fleet from 8 January 1964 to 31 May 1966. He was the first Naval Officer to serve as the Commandant of the National Defence Academy. His daughter is the famous Bharatanatyam dancer, Leela Samson.

== Early life ==
Samson was born on 25 September 1916, in Poona in Bombay Presidency, to Abraham Samuel Samson Killekar and Sarah Shalom Bapuji Israel Wargharkar. The Samson family was a part of the Bene Israel community which has base from villages in the Konkan area of western Maharashtra near Mumbai and resided in the Ohel David Synagogue. Benjamin was the seventh of 10 children. He attended the St. Vincent's High School in Poona. He left to join the Navy right after school.

== Naval career ==
=== Dufferin and mercantile marine ===
The Indian Mercantile Marine Training Ship (IMMTS) Dufferin was established in 1927 to train young men for India's marine service. Samson joined the Dufferin in December 1931 and graduated in December 1934. He then joined the British India Steam Navigation Company in 1934 as a cadet.

=== World War II ===
In September 1939, with the outbreak of the World War II, he was absorbed into the Royal Indian Navy as a sub-lieutenant. He served on the auxiliary patrol vessel HMIS Dipavati. He later commanded another patrol vessel HMIS Laxmi.

He served aboard the Frigate HMIS Indus which was on convoy escort duty in the Red Sea and off the coast of Ethiopia. He was transferred to the frigate HMIS Hindustan in 1941, which was part of an escort for a troop convoy from Ceylon to Rangoon. Samson was then selected to undergo a torpedo course and he proceeded to England. He specialised in Anti-submarine warfare. After the completion of the course, he was posted to the light cruiser HMS Newcastle.

=== Post-Independence ===
Upon the Independence of India, he held the rank of lieutenant commander and was the commanding officer of HMIS Sutlej (U95). Samson was promoted to acting commander with effect from 30 June 1948 and was appointed the First naval adviser to the high commissioner of India to the United Kingdom. The High Commissioner then was V. K. Krishna Menon, who later served as the minister of defence. He served as the naval advisor at London from May 1948 to December 1950 and was promoted acting captain on 1 January 1950. It was during this time that HMS Rotherham was bought and became the destroyer INS Rajput (D141).

In early 1951, Samson took over as the commander (executive officer) of the flagship of the Indian Navy, the cruiser INS Delhi (C74). Delhi was under the command of Captain S. G. Karmarkar. Samson then took over as the chief of personnel at Naval Headquarters, New Delhi. On 31 December 1953, Samson was promoted to substantive captain.

In 1954 he moved from Naval HQ to sea command and became the flag captain of INS Delhi (C74). He simultaneously served as the Chief Staff Officer to the Flag Officer Commanding (Flotilla) Indian Fleet. He commanded the Flagship INS Delhi for three years. As Flag Captain, he served under three Fleet Commanders – Rear Admirals F A Ballance, St John Tyrwhitt and Ram Dass Katari. After handing over command of Delhi to Captain P. S. Mahindroo, he assumed the office of Captain Superintendent Naval Dockyard Mumbai.

=== Flag rank ===
Samson was promoted to acting rear admiral and appointed as the first naval commandant of the National Defence Academy, assuming office on 27 December 1958. Promoted substantive rear admiral on 22 November 1962, he was the Reviewing Officer of the Passing Out Parade of the 23rd course on 7 December 1962. In April 1962, he was appointed the next Deputy Chief of the Naval Staff (DCNS), succeeding Rear Admiral Adhar Kumar Chatterji. Since he was the commandant of NDA, he was to take up this appointment by the end of the year. Commodore S M Nanda was to temporarily officiate as the DCNS. However, his posting as DCNS was cancelled and he was selected to attend the Imperial Defence College. He demitted office of Commandant NDA on 31 December 1962 and proceeded to London.

On 31 December 1963, while still doing the course at the Imperial Defence College, he was appointed the Flag Officer Commanding Indian Fleet (FOCIF). Rear Admiral Samson took over as the FOCIF on 4 January 1964. In his own words, "This to me was the perfect culmination of my naval career – commanding a fleet of several fine warships at sea." He flew his flag on his old ship, the INS Delhi, for a couple of days before transferring to the new INS Mysore (C60). On 26 January 1966, for his tenure as FOCIF, he was awarded the Param Vishisht Seva Medal (then called Vishisht Seva Medal, Class I).

After commanding the Indian Fleet for about two and a half years, Samson retired on 22 November 1966.

== Later life ==
Post retirement, Samson had a successful business career. He served as the CEO of the Mazagon Dock Shipbuilders from 1966 to 1973. During this time, he led the Frigate project. The first Indian built Frigate – INS Nilgiri was built by the Mazagaon Dock and handed over to the Indian Navy. The then prime minister of India, Indira Gandhi, commissioned INS Nilgiri on 3 June 1972. In a rare gesture, on 3 June 1972 Samson was promoted to the honorary rank of vice admiral for his outstanding contribution to the Frigate project and the Mazagaon Dock.

He then served as the chairman of the Confederation of Indian Industry (CII), Chairman of Philips India and Vice Chairman of Damodar Bulk Carriers.

== Bibliography ==
- Katari, Ram Dass (1983), A Sailor Remembers, Vikas, ISBN 9780706920642

Military offices
Preceded by Ram Dass Katari	Chief of personnel 1951–1954	Succeeded by Sardarilal Mathradas Nanda
Preceded by Adhar Kumar Chatterji	Commanding officer INS Delhi; 1954–1957	Succeeded by P. S. Mahindroo
Preceded by Major General Enaith Habibullah	Commandant of the National Defence Academy; 1958–1962	Succeeded by Air Marshal K L Sondhi
Preceded by Adhar Kumar Chatterji	Flag Officer Commanding Indian Fleet; 1964–1966	Succeeded by Sardarilal Mathradas Nanda
