= INS Talwar (F40) =

Talwar-class frigate

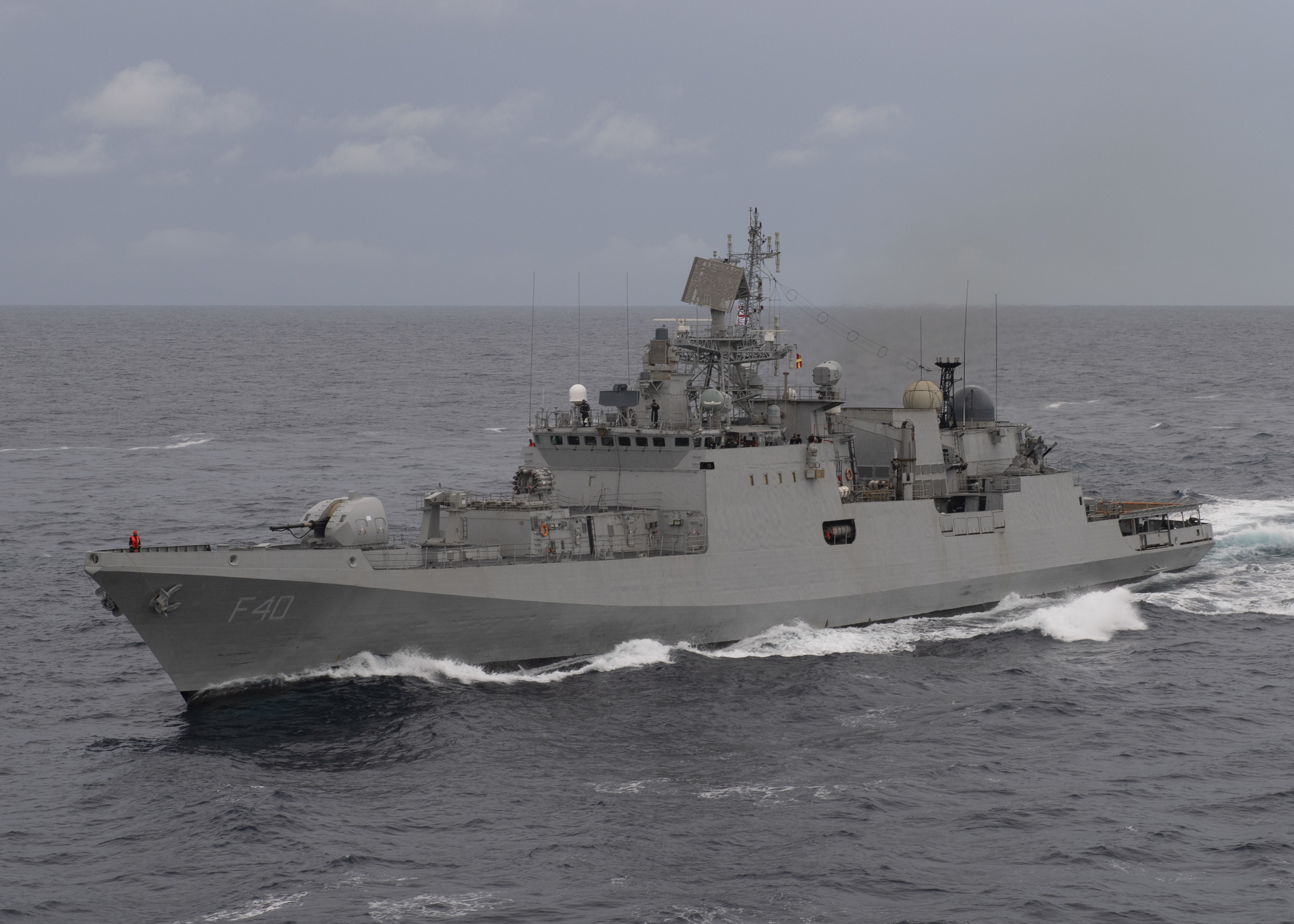
- INS Talwar (F40) in 2020

History

India
- Name: INS Talwar
- Namesake: "Sword"
- Ordered: 17 November 1997
- Builder: Baltiysky Zavod
- Laid down: 10 March 1999
- Launched: 12 May 2000
- Commissioned: 18 June 2003
- Status: in active service

General characteristics
- Class & type: Talwar-class frigate
- Displacement: 3,620 tons standard, 4,035 tons full load
- Length: 124.8 m (409 ft)
- Beam: 15.2 m (50 ft)
- Draught: 4.5 m (15 ft)
- Propulsion: 2 × DS-71 cruise turbines; 9,000 hp forward and 1,500 bhp, 2 × DT-59 boost turbines; 19,500 hp forward and 4,500 bhp
- Speed: 30 knots (56 km/h)
- Range: 4,850 mi (7,810 km) at 14 knots (26 km/h), 1,600 miles (2,600 km) at 30 knots (56 km/h),
- Endurance: 30 days
- Complement: 180 (including 18 officers)
- Sensors & processing systems: Surface Search; 1 × 3Ts-25E Garpun-B radar at I-band frequency; 2 × MR-212/201-1 radar at I-band frequency; 1 × Kelvin Hughes Nucleus-2 6000A radar; 1 × Ladoga-ME-11356 inertial navigation and stabilisation suite; Air/Surface Search; 1 × Fregat M2EM (NATO: Top Plate) 3D circular scan radar; Sonar;\; BEL HUMSA (Hull Mounted Sonar Array); BEL APSOH (Advanced Panoramic Sonar Hull) hull-mounted sonar
- Armament: Anti-air missiles: 24 × Shtil-1 medium range missiles; 8 × Igla-1E (SA-16); Anti-ship/Land-attack missiles: 8 × VLS launched BrahMos, anti-ship cruise missiles; Guns: 1 × 100mm A-190E, naval gun; 2 × Kashtan CIWS; Anti-submarine warfare: 2 × 2 533mm torpedo tubes; 1 × RBU-6000 (RPK-8) rocket launcher
- Aircraft carried: 1 x Ka-28 Helix-A, Ka-31 Helix B or HAL Dhruv helicopter

INS Talwar (F40) (lit. 'Sword') is the lead ship of the Talwar-class frigates of the Indian Navy. Its name means "Sword" in Hindi (see Talwar). She was built in Russia, and commissioned into the Indian Navy on 18 June 2003.

Talwar is a multirole frigate and true to her name, has participated in various operations and exercises since her commissioning, including anti-piracy operations off the coast of Somalia.

== Design ==
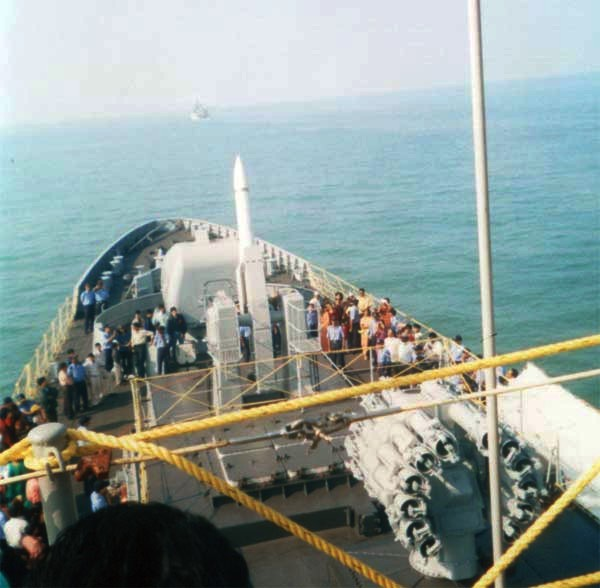
3S90E "Shtil" (export variant of M-22 Uragan) single-arm launcher version on INS Talwar (F40)

Talwar is the lead ship of her class of frigates. The Talwar-class guided missile frigates are modified Krivak III-class frigates built by Russia. Much of the equipment on the ship is Russian-made, but a significant number of systems of Indian origin have also been incorporated.

== Operational history ==
Talwar was built by the Baltiyskiy shipyard. She was launched in May 2000. Delivery to the Indian Navy was scheduled for May 2002 after running, state and acceptance trials. Sea trials were completed in the Baltic Sea on 29 May 2002. The ship was commissioned formally into the Indian Navy on 18 June 2003 by (later Vice Admiral) Satish Soni. INS Talwar arrived home at Mumbai's Naval Dockyard on 12 August 2003, after a long journey from St. Petersburg.

The ship is affiliated with the 16th Light Cavalry Regiment of the Indian Army and continues to be a frontline warship of the Indian Navy's Western Fleet

== Service history ==
INS Talwar has been deployed around the Indian Ocean, making friendly visits at various ports. She has also participated in various exercises including Malabar 2008 with the United States Navy, multinational maritime exercise ‘Cutlass Express 2021 (CE21) and with the French Navy.

=== Anti-piracy measures off the Somali coast ===
On 28 May 2009 at around 10:20 GMT, while about 225 nautical miles (417 km) east of Aden, Talwar received a distress signal from a merchant vessel MV Maud about a skiff with eight armed persons on board approaching it at very high speed. The frigate immediately dispatched its Chetak helicopter armed with 7.62mm light machine guns which spotted pirates scrambling up a ladder hooked to MV Maud. The helicopter fired on the two pirates on the ladder and they fell into the sea. Simultaneously, the frigate sent its MARCOS team led by Ram Narain by high-speed inflatable boats to intercept the skiff. Six pirates were disarmed and their cache of Kalashnikov assault rifles, Katyusha rockets, a rocket launcher, flares and mobile phones were seized. The pirates were later arrested by warships from the global task force in a follow-up action.

On 13 April 2024, INS Talwar intercepted a suspicious dhow in the western Arabian Sea and confiscated 940 kilograms of contraband narcotics. The seized contents included 453 kg of methamphetamines, 416 kg of hash and 71 kg of heroin. The operation was carried out by MARCOS of Indian Navy, and was a part of Operation Crimson Barracuda.

On 22 September 2024, INS Talwar reached Mombasa, Kenya on a friendly visit under the command of Captain Jithu George and a crew of around 300 personnel. The port call saw activities like cross deck visits and programmes during the harbour phase. Also, after the end of the port call, INS Talwar participated in EEZ surveillance and Maritime Partnership Exercise with KNS Shujaa. On 6 October 2024, INS Talwar reached Simon's Town, South Africa for Exercise IBSAMAR VIII. The exercise concluded on 20 October 2024. On 27 October 2024, INS Talwar reached La Réunion, France as part of its overseas deployment in the Indian Ocean Region (IOR).
