= INS Dunagiri (F36) =

1974 Nilgiri-class frigate

History

India
- Name: INS Dunagiri
- Namesake: Dunagiri peak
- Builder: Mazagon Docks
- Launched: 9 March 1974
- Commissioned: 5 May 1977
- Decommissioned: 20 October 2010
- Fate: Decommissioned

General characteristics
- Class & type: Nilgiri-class frigate
- Displacement: 2682 tons (standard); 2962 tons (full load)
- Length: 113 m (371 ft)
- Beam: 13 m (43 ft)
- Draught: 4.3 m (14 ft)
- Propulsion: 2 × 550 psi boilers; 2 × 30,000 hp (22,000 kW) motors
- Speed: 28 knots (52 km/h; 32 mph)
- Range: 4,000 nmi (7,400 km; 4,600 mi) at 12 knots (22 km/h; 14 mph)
- Complement: 267 (incl 17 officers)
- Sensors & processing systems: Signaal DA05 / BEL PFN513 radar; Signaal LW08 / BEL RAWL02 surface radar; Signaal ZW06 / BEL RASHMI navigation radar; Signaal M-45 navigation radar; Westinghouse SQS-505 / Graesby 750 sonar; Type 170 active attack sonar
- Armament: 2 × MK.6 Vickers 115 mm guns; 4 × AK-230 30 mm guns; 2 × Oerlikon 20 mm guns; 2 × triple ILAS 3 324 mm torpedo tubes with Whitehead A244S or the Indian NST-58 torpedoes
- Aircraft carried: 1 Westland Sea King or HAL Chetak

INS Dunagiri (F36) was a Nilgiri-class frigate of the Indian Navy that served for 33 years between its commissioning on 5 May 1977 and its decommissioning on 20 October 2010.

== Name ==
Named after the Himalayan peak, Dunagiri, the ship was a Nilgiri-class frigate that was a part of the Navy's 14th Frigate Squadron. Dunagiri's crest had a Himalayan Osprey on it and her motto read Victory is My Profession.

== Operational history ==
Dunagiri was the fourth of the Nilgiri-class frigates to be built at the Mazagon Docks and it took almost 58 months from the commencement of production till her final delivery to the Navy. However, Dunagiri also had a large number of indigenously produced equipment in her although much of her firepower and radars and sensors were of British or Dutch origin. Vice-admiral S Jain who later served as flag-officer-commanding-in-chief of the Western Naval Command was the Dunagiri's first commanding officer.

== Operational issues ==
Dunagiri underwent a medium refit in 1990 but the process took 40 months against a normal schedule of 12 months, being finally completed in February 1994. India's Comptroller and Auditor General observed that the delay in the work had not only failed to rectify the ship's main defects but had also led to corrosive damage to it on account of prolonged detention at the shipyard that necessitated a short refit in 1995 and cost overruns of ₹4.52 crores.

In 2006 Dunagiri was involved in a collision off the coast of Mumbai when it struck a Shipping Corporation of India merchant vessel, MV Kiti. Although there were no casualties the frigate suffered damage and required extensive repairs.

== Commemoration ==
On its decommissioning a philatelic cover featuring Dunagiri and a special cancellation mark featuring the ship's crest were issued by India Post.

On 15 July 2022, a new Nilgiri class stealth frigate was launched which is its successor.
