= Southern Naval Command =

Indian Navy command

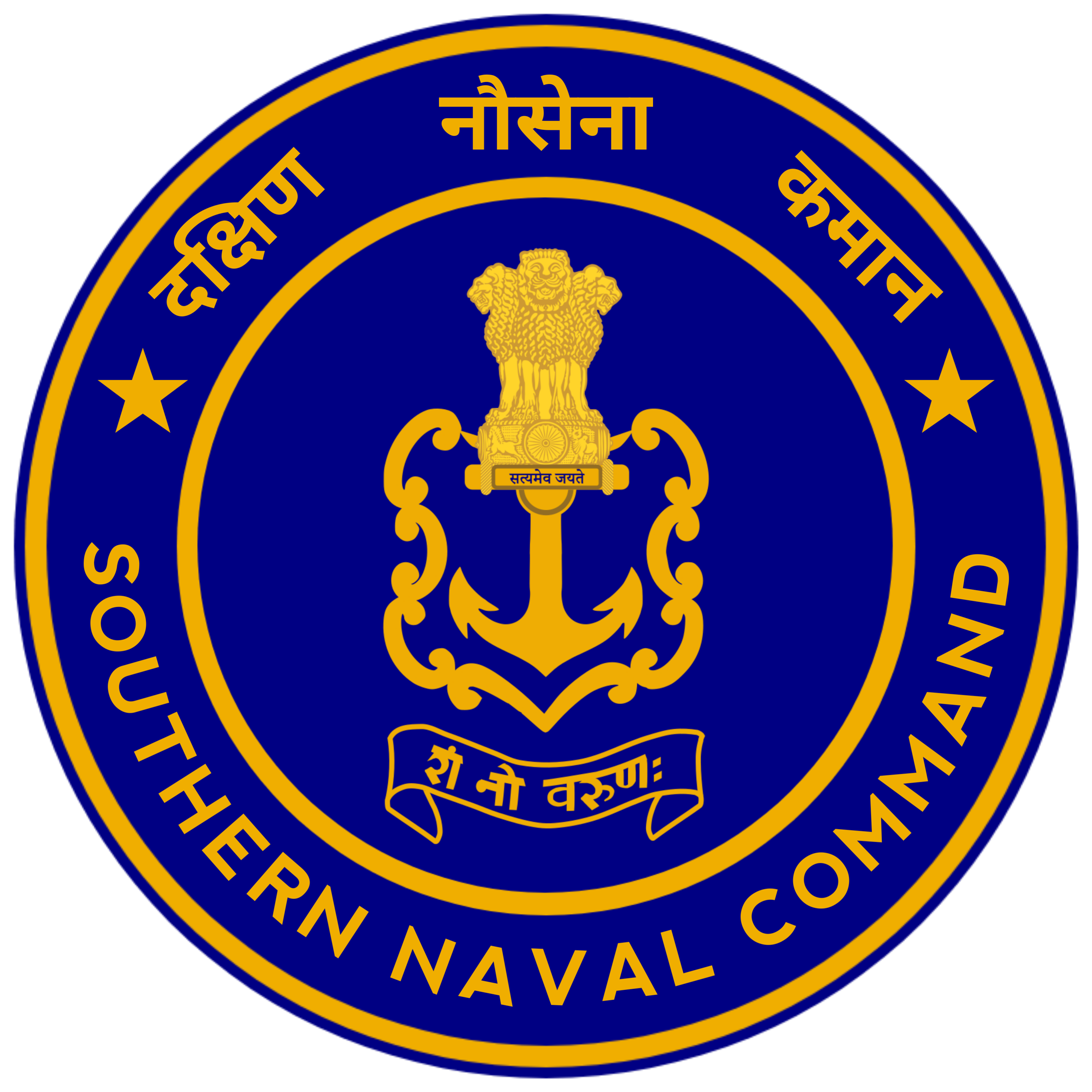
- Crest of the Southern Naval Command
- Active: 1977
- Country: India
- Branch: Indian Navy
- Type: Command
- Headquarters: Kochi, Kerala

Commanders
- FOC-in-C: Vice Admiral Sameer Saxena, AVSM, NM
- Chief of Staff: Rear Admiral Prakash Gopalan

The Southern Naval Command is one of the three command-level formations of the Indian Navy. Southern Naval Command is the largest naval command in India and it has its headquarters in Kochi, Kerala at INS Venduruthy. It is the Training Command of the Indian Navy.

The Command is commanded by a Three Star Flag Officer of the rank of Vice Admiral with the title Flag Officer Commanding-in-Chief Southern Command (FOC-in-C). Vice Admiral Sameer Saxena, AVSM, NM is the current FOC-in-C SNC, who took over on 31 December 2023.

== History ==
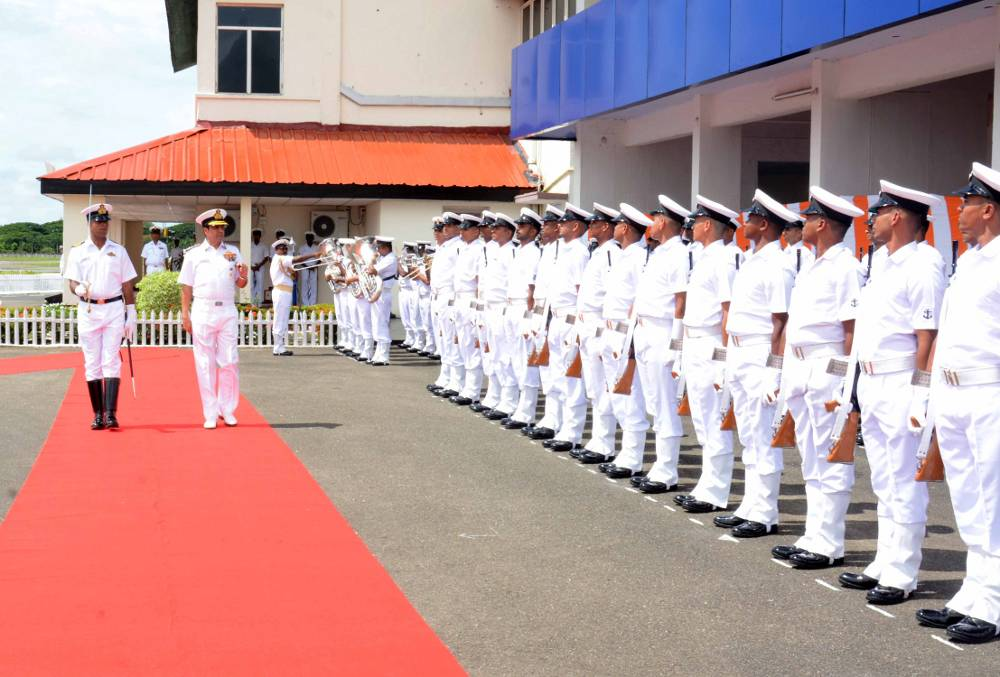
The CNS Adm R K Dhowan inspecting the guard of honour at the Southern Naval Command

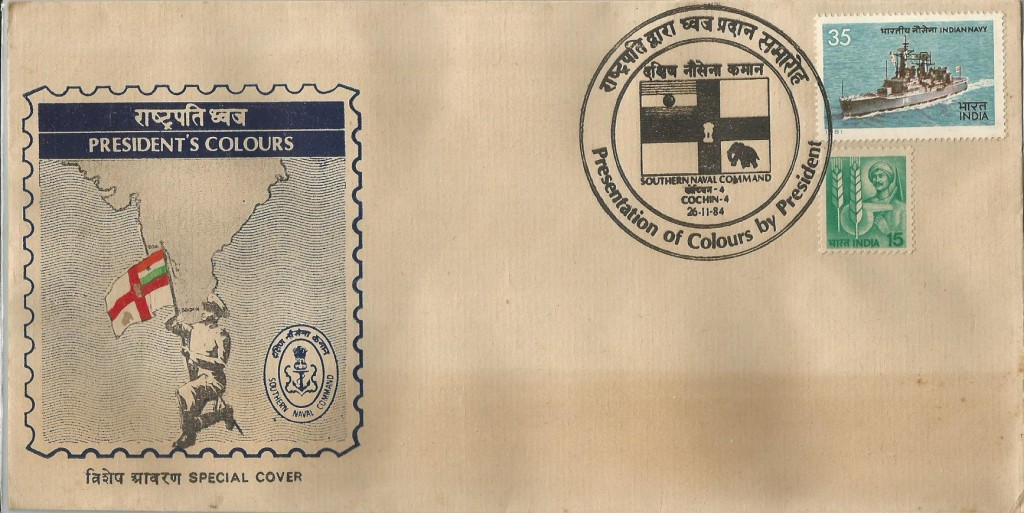
Stamp released on the occasion of the presentation of President's Colour Award to Southern Naval Command in 1984 by President Zail Singh.

After the independence and the partition of India on 15 August 1947, the ships and personnel of the Royal Indian Navy were divided between the Dominion of India and the Dominion of Pakistan. The division of the ships was on the basis of two-thirds of the fleet to India, one third to Pakistan.

The shore establishments on the southern coast were headed by the Commodore Cochin (COMCHIN), a one star appointment. The COMCHIN directly reported into the Chief of the Naval Staff. In 1967, the Goa Area was included under COMCHIN. On 1 March 1968, the Commodore Cochin (COMCHIN) was re-designated as Commodore Commanding Southern Naval Area (COMSOUTH). In August 1970, the appointment of COMSOUTH was upgraded to the two-star rank of Rear Admiral and was re-designated Flag Officer Commanding Southern Naval Area (FOCSOUTH). This appointment was later upgraded, in October 1977, to the three star rank of Vice Admiral and re-designated Flag Officer Commanding-in-Chief Southern Naval Command (FOC-in-C SNC). On 1 July 1986, the Southern Naval Command was made the Training Command. All the training establishments were placed under the command as well as the responsibility of formulating and executing of training policy.

== Area of responsibility ==
The Southern Naval Command and is commanded by the Flag Officer Commanding-in-Chief. The Southern Naval Command is the Training Command of Indian Navy and is responsible for the training of all its personnel, both officers as well as sailors, from basic to advance stages. It has subsidiary units from Jamnagar in Gujarat to Lonavala in Maharashtra, Goa and in Orissa but the majority of training units are in Kochi. The Indian Naval Academy is also placed under the Southern Naval Command.

Kavaratti Islands is the home to INS Dweeprakshak, the main naval base of the Southern Naval Command in the Lakshadweep islands.

== Capabilities ==
The Southern Naval Command consists of a Flag Officer Sea Training (FOST), the 1st Training Squadron (1TS), training establishments and bases, and land forces and survey & Patrol ships in addition to other smaller Patrol crafts and boats. It has a naval air station, and a ship repair yard.

== Organisation ==
The Southern Naval Command is organised as follows:

| Post | Current Holder | References |
|---|---|---|
| Flag Officer Commanding-in-Chief | Vice Admiral Sameer Saxena, AVSM, NM | |
| Chief of Staff | Rear Admiral Upal Kundu | |
| Commandant of Indian Naval Academy | Vice Admiral Alok Ananda, YSM | |
| Flag Officer Sea Training (FOST) | Rear Admiral Sundeep Singh Randhawa | |
| Commandant Naval War College, Goa | Rear Admiral Manjit Moses Thomas, NM | |
| Admiral Superintendent Yards (ASY) - Kochi | Rear Admiral Sanjay Sharma | |
| Chief Staff Officer (Training) | Rear Admiral Deepak Singhal | |

== Naval bases ==
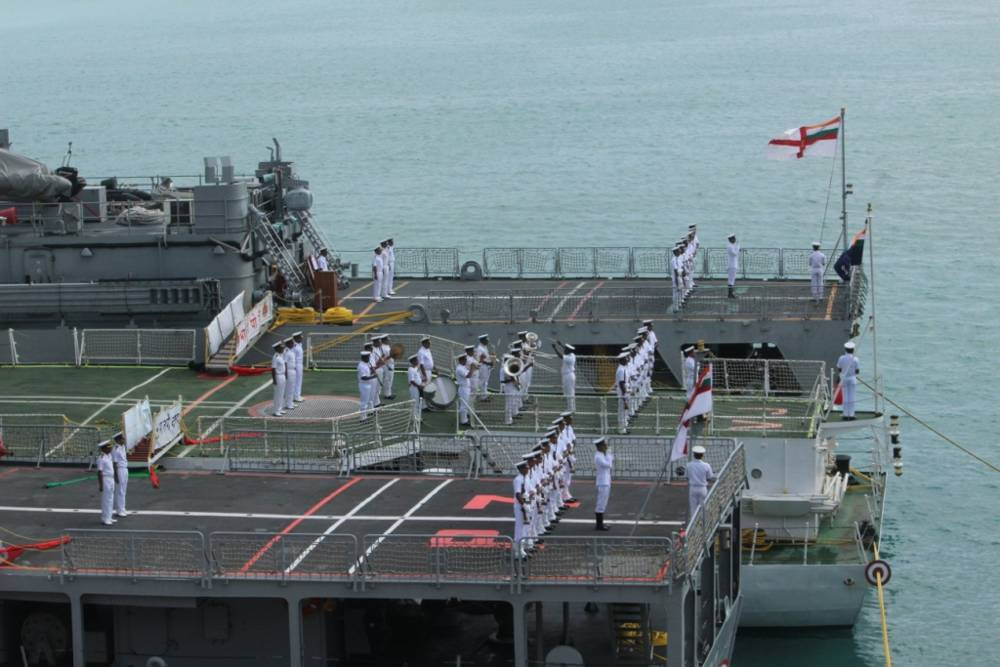
Ships of the 1st Training Squadron

The naval bases under Southern Naval Command are as follows:

| Base | City | State/Territory | Role |
|---|---|---|---|
| INS Dweeprakshak | Kavaratti | Lakshwadweep | Logistics and Maintenance support |
| INS Minicoy | Minicoy | Lakshwadweep | Forward Operating Base |
| INS Androth (Under construction) | Androth | Lakshwadweep | Forward Operating Base and Radar station |
| INS Garuda | Kochi | Kerala | Naval Air Station |
| INHS Sanjivani | Kochi | Kerala | Naval Hospital |
| INS Venduruthy | Kochi | Kerala | Logistics and Administrative support |
| INS Dronacharya | Kochi | Kerala | Naval Weapons Training |
| INS Chilka | Chilka | Odisha | Naval Training |
| INHS Nivarini | Chilka | Odisha | Naval Hospital |
| INS Mandovi | Panaji | Goa | Naval Training |
| INS Hamla | Mumbai | Maharashtra | Combined Operations Training |
| INS Shivaji | Lonavala | Maharashtra | Technical Training |
| INHS Kasturi | Lonavala | Maharashtra | Naval Hospital |
| INS Valsura | Jamnagar | Gujarat | Electric Equipment Training |
| INS Rajali | Arakkonam | Tamil Nadu | Naval Air Base |
| INS Agrani | Coimbatore | Tamil Nadu | Leadership Training |
| INS Zamorin | Ezhimala | Kerala | Logistics and Maintenance support to Indian Naval Academy |
| INS Satavahana | Visakhapatnam | Andhra Pradesh | Submarine Warfare Training |

== List of Commanders ==
| S.No | Name | Assumed office | Left office | Notes | References |
|---|---|---|---|---|---|
Commodore-in-Charge Cochin (COMCHIN)
| 1 | Commodore Henry Bramhall Ellison | 1 August 1948 | 29 July 1950 | Seconded from the Royal Navy | |
| 2 | Commodore Eric G. McGregor DSO | 30 July 1950 | 26 November 1952 | Seconded from the Royal Navy | |
| 3 | Commodore A. D. H. Jay DSO, DSC | November 1952 | 20 September 1953 | Seconded from the Royal Navy | |
| 4 | Commodore Bhaskar Sadashiv Soman | January 1954 | 20 November 1956 | Later Chief of the Naval Staff | |
| 5 | Commodore Sadashiv Ganesh Karmarkar MBE | 1 May 1957 | 16 April 1960 | | |
| 6 | Commodore Reginald Sherring David | April 1960 | 18 June 1962 | | |
| 7 | Commodore G. S. Kapoor | June 1962 | December 1965 | | |
| 8 | Commodore J. D. Mody | December 1965 | January 1968 | | |
| 9 | Commodore Inder Singh | January 1968 | February 1968 | | |
Commodore Commanding Southern Naval Area (COMSOUTH)
| 1 | Commodore Inder Singh | March 1968 | November 1970 | | |
Flag Officer Commanding Southern Naval Area (FOCSOUTH)
| 1 | Rear Admiral V. A. Kamath PVSM | November 1970 | March 1973 | | |
| 2 | Rear Admiral Elenjikal Chandy Kuruvila PVSM, AVSM | March 1973 | October 1973 | | |
| 3 | Rear Admiral S. H. Sarma PVSM | October 1973 | January 1975 | | |
| 4 | Rear Admiral Ronald Lynsdale Pereira AVSM | January 1975 | 16 April 1976 | Later Chief of the Naval Staff. | |
| 5 | Rear Admiral V. E. C. Barboza AVSM* | 16 April 1976 | 26 October 1977 | | |
Flag Officer Commanding-in-Chief Southern Naval Command (FOC-in-C SNC)
| 1 | Vice Admiral V. E. C. Barboza AVSM* | 26 October 1977 | 3 March 1979 | | |
| 2 | Vice Admiral Oscar Stanley Dawson PVSM, AVSM | 30 March 1979 | 26 February 1982 | Later Chief of the Naval Staff. | |
| 3 | Vice Admiral Radhakrishna Hariram Tahiliani AVSM | 26 February 1982 | 30 March 1983 | Later Chief of the Naval Staff. | |
| 4 | Vice Admiral K. K. Nayyar AVSM | 30 March 1983 | 28 November 1984 | Later Vice-Chief of the Naval Staff. | |
| 5 | Vice Admiral G. M. Hiranandani PVSM, AVSM, NM | 28 November 1984 | 30 November 1987 | Later Vice-Chief of the Naval Staff | |
| 6 | Vice Admiral Laxminarayan Ramdas PVSM, AVSM, VrC, VSM | 30 November 1987 | 25 February 1989 | Later Chief of the Naval Staff | |
| 7 | Vice Admiral R. P. Sawhney PVSM | 25 February 1989 | 30 September 1990 | | |
| 8 | Vice Admiral Suren P. Govil PVSM, AVSM | 1 October 1990 | 30 December 1990 | | |
| 9 | Vice Admiral KASZ Raju PVSM, AVSM, NM | 30 December 1990 | 29 August 1992 | | |
| 10 | Vice Admiral S. K. Chand PVSM, AVSM | 29 August 1992 | 14 October 1993 | Later Vice-Chief of the Naval Staff | |
| 11 | Vice Admiral Inderjit Bedi PVSM, AVSM | 17 October 1993 | 30 April 1996 | | |
| 12 | Vice Admiral A. R. Tandon AVSM | 30 April 1996 | 23 October 1996 | | |
| 13 | Vice Admiral Madhvendra Singh AVSM, NM | 23 October 1996 | 31 March 1998 | Later Chief of the Naval Staff | |
| 14 | Vice Admiral Sushil Kumar PVSM, UYSM, AVSM, NM | 31 March 1998 | 30 December 1998 | Later Chief of the Naval Staff | |
| 15 | Vice Admiral R. N. Ganesh PVSM, AVSM, NM | 8 March 1999 | March 2001 | | |
| 16 | Vice Admiral Harinder Singh PVSM, AVSM | March 2001 | May 2002 | | |
| 17 | Vice Admiral Madanjit Singh AVSM | 31 May 2002 | 1 October 2003 | | |
| 18 | Vice Admiral Yashwant Prasad PVSM, AVSM, NM | 15 October 2003 | 1 August 2004 | | |
| 19 | Vice Admiral S. C. S. Bangara PVSM, AVSM | 1 August 2004 | 31 July 2006 | | |
| 20 | Vice Admiral Jagjit Singh Bedi PVSM, UYSM, AVSM, VSM | 31 July 2006 | 28 July 2007 | | |
| 21 | Vice Admiral Sunil Kumar Damle PVSM, AVSM, NM, VSM | 28 July 2007 | 31 August 2009 | | |
| 22 | Vice Admiral K. N. Sushil PVSM, AVSM, NM | 1 September 2009 | 31 May 2012 | | |
| 23 | Vice Admiral Satish Soni PVSM, AVSM, NM | 31 May 2012 | 2014 | Later served as FOC-in-C of the Eastern Naval Command | |
| 24 | Vice Admiral Surinder Pal Singh Cheema PVSM, AVSM, NM | 2014 | 2015 | Later served as FOC-in-C of the Western Naval Command | |
| 25 | Vice Admiral Sunil Lanba AVSM | 1 February 2016 | 31 May 2016 | Later served as Chief of Naval Staff and as Chairman of the Chiefs of Staff Committee | |
| 26 | Vice Admiral Girish Luthra AVSM, VSM | 1 June 2016 | 29 May 2016 | Later served as FOC-in-C of the Western Naval Command | |
| 27 | Vice Admiral AR Karve PVSM, AVSM | 29 May 2016 | 30 July 2018 | | |
| 28 | Vice Admiral Anil Kumar Chawla PVSM, AVSM, NM, VSM | 30 July 2018 | 30 November 2021 | | |
| 29 | Vice Admiral M A Hampiholi PVSM, AVSM, NM | 30 November 2021 | 31 December 2023 | | |
| 30 | Vice Admiral Vennam Srinivas AVSM, NM | 1 January 2024 | 31 October 2025 | | |
| 31 | Vice Admiral Sameer Saxena AVSM, NM | 1 November 2025 | Present | | |

== See also ==
- Western Naval Command
- Eastern Naval Command
