= List of Indian naval air squadrons =

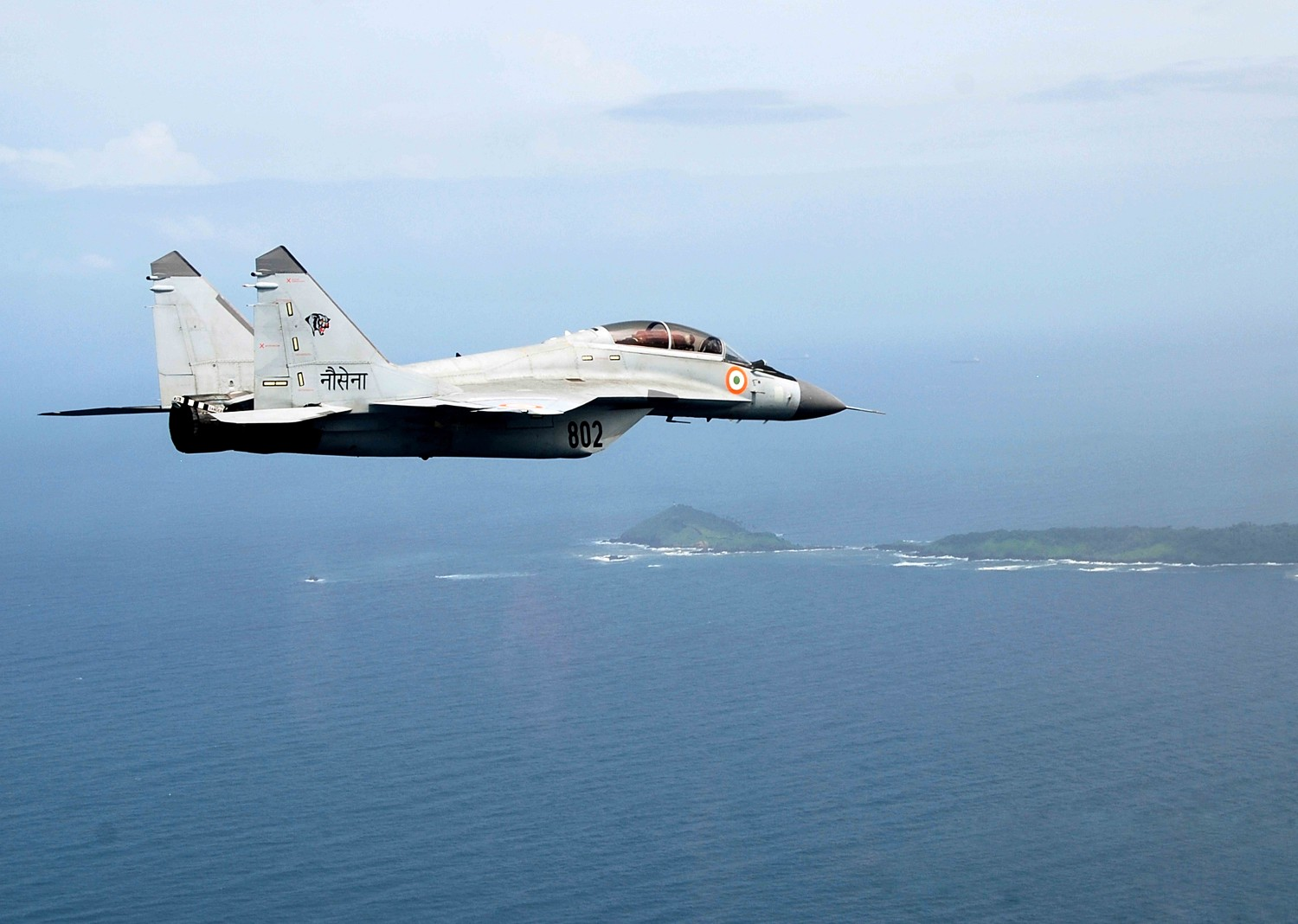
Mikoyan MiG-29K in flight over Indian islands

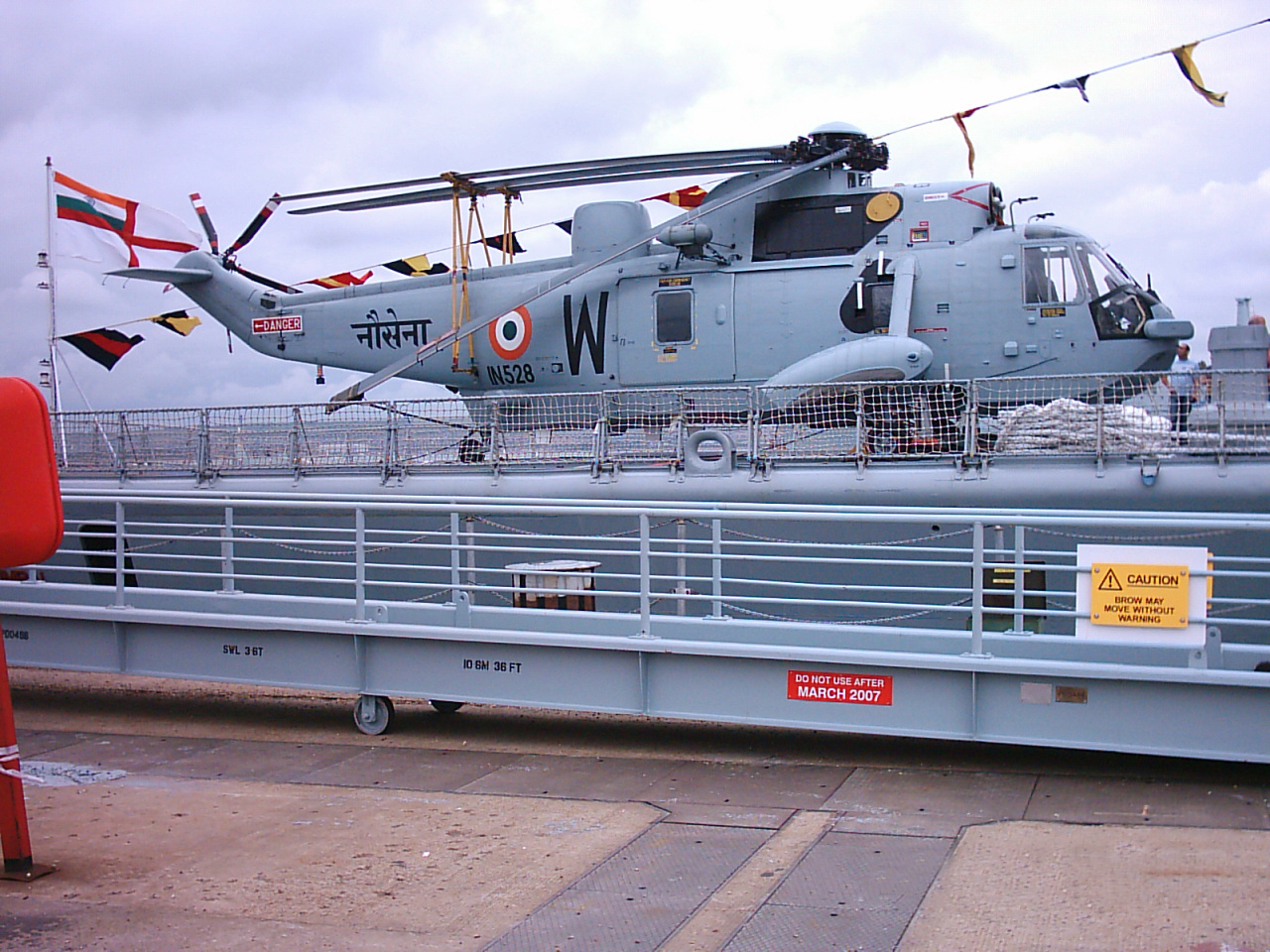
Sea King aboard destroyer INS Mumbai

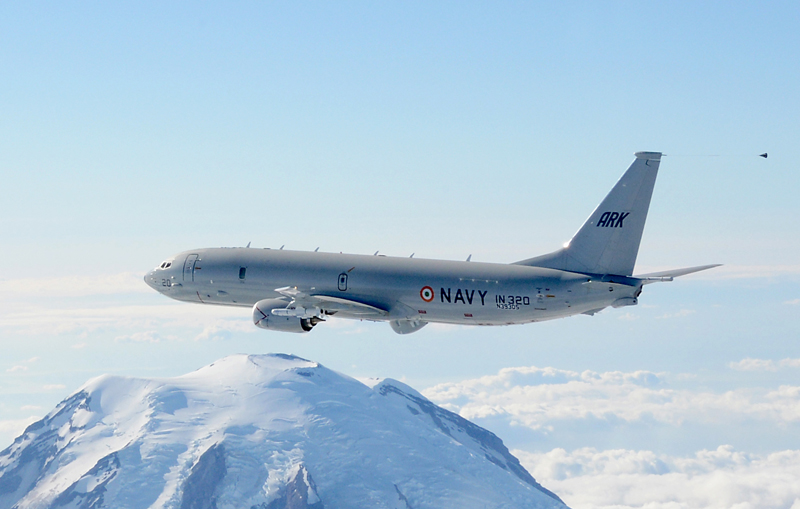
Boeing P-8I in flight over mountains

Roundel and fin flash of Indian aircraft

The Indian Navy currently operates twenty-five air squadrons. Of these, eleven operate fixed-wing aircraft, ten are helicopter squadrons and the remaining three are equipped with unmanned aerial vehicles (UAV). Building on the legacy inherited from the Royal Navy prior to Indian independence, the concept of naval aviation in India started with the establishment of Directorate of Naval Aviation at Naval Headquarters (NHQ) in early 1948. Later that year officers and sailors from the Indian Navy were sent to Britain for pilot training. In 1951, the Fleet Requirement Unit (FRU) was formed to meet the aviation requirements of the navy. On 1 January 1953, the charge of Cochin airfield was handed over to the navy from the Directorate General of Civil Aviation. On 11 March, the FRU was commissioned at Cochin with ten newly acquired Sealand aircraft. The navy's first air station, INS Garuda, was commissioned two months later. From February 1955 to December 1958, ten Firefly aircraft were acquired. To meet the training requirements of the pilots, the indigenously developed HAL HT-2 trainer was inducted into the FRU. On 17 January 1959, the FRU was commissioned as Indian Naval Air Squadron (INAS) 550, to be the first Indian naval air squadron. In the following two years, three more naval air squadrons—INAS 300, INAS 310 and INAS 551—were commissioned. The first two operated from the newly purchased aircraft carrier INS Vikrant flying Sea Hawks and Alizés, whereas the latter one, equipped with Vampires, was used for training purposes.

Between 1961 and 1971, three helicopter squadrons were commissioned—INAS 321, INAS 330 and INAS 561. The first two were equipped with HAL Chetak and Sea King 42Bs for search and rescue and anti-submarine roles respectively, whereas the later one assumed a training role. In December 1971, the squadrons embarked on the aircraft carrier INS Vikrant saw action in the India–Pakistan war of 1971. Between 1976 and 1977, INAS 312 and INAS 315 were commissioned with Super Constellation and Ilyushin Il-38s respectively. In December 1980, another helicopter squadron intended for anti-submarine warfare—INAS 333—was commissioned. It was initially equipped with Ka-25s, and with Ka-28s in late 1980s. In 1984, one patrol and one helicopter squadron—INAS 318 and INAS 336—were commissioned. The patrol squadron was initially equipped with Islander aircraft, but they were replaced by Dornier 228s in 2000. In November 1990, another Sea King squadron—INAS 339—was commissioned. Later in 1993, the Sea Kings were replaced by Ka-28s, and in 2003, Ka-31s were inducted, making it the only Indian naval air squadron for the role of airborne early warning and control.

Though several new fixed wing aircraft and helicopters were inducted into the navy in the early 2000s, they were assigned to the existing squadrons with no new squadrons being commissioned until 2006. In January of that year, INAS 342, the first squadron to be equipped with UAVs, was commissioned. Later that year, the Sea Harrier training assigned to INAS 551 were detached and commissioned separately as INAS 552. However, the Sea Harriers were phased out in May 2016, and presently the operational status of the squadron is unknown. On 24 March 2009, for the first time, two squadrons—INAS 311 and INAS 350—were commissioned on the same day. INAS 311 is intended for maritime patrol and operates Dornier 228s, whereas INAS 350, a multirole helicopter squadron, operates Sikorsky SH-3s. In 2011–2012, another two UAV squadrons—INAS 343 and INAS 344—were commissioned. In 2013, a fighter plane and a multirole helicopter squadron—INAS 303 and INAS 322—were commissioned with MiG-29Ks and HAL Dhruvs. On 6 March 2024, INAS 334 was commissioned with Sikorsky MH-60R helicopters.

== List of Squadrons ==
* Indicates a helicopter squadron

| Squadron name | Insignia | Nickname | Aircraft operated | | Role | Established | Citations |
| Squadron name | Insignia | Nickname | Aircraft | Period | Role | Established | Citations |
|---|---|---|---|---|---|---|---|
| INAS 300 | | White Tigers | Hawker Sea Hawk | July 1960 – December 1983 | Fighter | 7 July 1960 | |
| INAS 300 | | White Tigers | BAE Sea Harrier | December 1983 – May 2016 | Fighter | 7 July 1960 | |
| INAS 300 | | White Tigers | Mikoyan MiG 29K/KUB | May 2016 – present | Fighter | 7 July 1960 | |
| INAS 303 | | Black Panthers | Mikoyan MiG-29K | May 2013 – present | Fighter | 11 May 2013 | |
| INAS 310 | | Cobras | Breguet Alizé Br.1050 | March 1961 – April 1991 | Anti-submarine warfare | 21 March 1961 | |
| INAS 310 | | Cobras | Dornier 228 | August 1991 – present | Electronic warfare; Maritime patrol | 21 March 1961 | |
| INAS 311 | | Kites | Dornier 228 | March 2009 – present | Electronic warfare; Maritime patrol | 24 March 2009 | |
| INAS 312 | | Albatross | Lockheed Super Constellation | November 1976 – 1983 | Maritime patrol; Anti-submarine warfare | 18 November 1976 | |
| INAS 312 | | Albatross | Tupolev TU-142M | April 1988 – March 2017 | Maritime patrol; Anti-submarine warfare | 18 November 1976 | |
| INAS 312 | | Albatross | Boeing P-8I Neptune (Note: Operated under a sub-squadron, INAS 312A.) | November 2016 – present | Maritime patrol; Anti-submarine warfare | 18 November 1976 | |
| INAS 313 | | Sea Eagles | Dornier 228 | 22 July 2019 – present | Maritime patrol; Search and Rescue | 22 July 2019 | |
| INAS 314 | | Raptors | Dornier 228 | 29 November 2019 – present | Maritime patrol; Search and Rescue | 29 November 2019 | |
| INAS 315 | | Winged Stallions | Ilyushin Il-38 | 1 October 1977 – 31 October 2023 | Maritime patrol; Anti-submarine warfare | 1 October 1977 | |
| INAS 316 | INAS 316 insignia | The Condors | Boeing P-8I Neptune | 29 March 2022 – present | Maritime patrol Anti-submarine warfare | 29 March 2022 | |
| INAS 318 | | Hawks | Britten-Norman Islander | March 1984 – May 2000 | Electronic warfare; Maritime patrol | 10 March 1984 | |
| INAS 318 | | Hawks | Dornier 228 | May 2000 – present | Electronic warfare; Maritime patrol | 10 March 1984 | |
| INAS 321* | | Angels | Alouette III/ HAL Chetak (Note: The French Alouette III light helicopters were produced in India under license by Hindustan Aircraft Limited (HAL) as "Chetaks".) | March 1969 – present | Search and rescue | 15 March 1969 | |
| INAS 322* | | Guardians | HAL Dhruv Mk.I | November 2013 – present | Multirole | 12 November 2013 | |
| INAS 323* | | Harriers | HAL Dhruv Mk.III MR | April 2021 – present | Multirole | 19 April 2021 | |
| INAS 324* | | Kestrels | HAL Dhruv Mk.III MR | July 2022 – present | Multirole | 4 July 2022 | |
| INAS 325* | | Eagle Owl | HAL Dhruv Mk.III MR | May 2022 – present | Multirole | 31 May 2022 | |
| INAS 330* | | Harpoons | Sea King 42B | April 1971 – 14 June 2026 | Anti-submarine warfare | 17 April 1971 | |
| INAS 333* | | Eagles | Kamov Ka-25 | December 1980 – April 2009 | Anti-submarine warfare | 11 December 1980 | |
| INAS 333* | | Eagles | Kamov Ka-28 | 1989 – present | Anti-submarine warfare | 11 December 1980 | |
| INAS 334* | | Seahawks | Sikorsky MH-60R | 6 March 2024 - present | Multirole | 6 March 2024 | |
| INAS 335* | | Ospreys | Sikorsky MH-60R | 17 December 2025 - present | Multirole | 17 December 2025 | |
| INAS 336* | | Flaming Arrows | Sea King 42B | December 1984 – present | Anti-submarine warfare; Training | 20 December 1984 | |
| INAS 339* | | Falcons | Sea King 42B | November 1990 – March 1993 | Airborne early warning and control | 23 November 1990 | |
| INAS 339* | | Falcons | Kamov Ka-28 | March 1993 – May 2009 | Airborne early warning and control | 23 November 1990 | |
| INAS 339* | | Falcons | Kamov Ka-31 | 2003 – present | Airborne early warning and control | 23 November 1990 | |
| INAS 342 | | Flying Sentinels | IAI Heron | January 2006 – present | Reconnaissance | 6 January 2006 | |
| INAS 343 | | Frontier Formidables | Drishti-10 Starliner | January 2011 – present | Reconnaissance | 17 January 2011 | |
| INAS 344 | | Spirited Shadowers | IAI Heron | April 2012 – present | Reconnaissance | 11 April 2012 | |
| INAS 350* | | Saras | Sikorsky UH-3H | March 2009 – June 2024 | Multirole | 24 March 2009 | |
| INAS 350* | | Saras | Sea King 42C | June 2024 – present | Multirole | 24 March 2009 | |
| INAS 550 | | Flying Fish | Short Sealand | June 1959 – mid 1960s | Training | 15 June 1959 | |
| INAS 550 | | Flying Fish | Fairey Firefly | February 1954 – scrapped (Note: The Fairey Firefly aircraft in use by INAS 550 were scrapped, though it is unknown when this occurred. One unit remains preserved.) | Training | 15 June 1959 | |
| INAS 550 | | Flying Fish | HAL HT-2 (Note: Trainer aircraft were operated under sub-squadrons INAS 550A and INAS 550B.) | October 1956 – 1976 | Training | 15 June 1959 | |
| INAS 550 | | Flying Fish | Britten-Norman Islander | 1976 – 2016 | Training | 15 June 1959 | |
| INAS 550 | | Flying Fish | HAL HPT-32 | January 1976 – October 1987 | Training | 15 June 1959 | |
| INAS 550 | | Flying Fish | Dornier 228 | 1995 – present | Training | 15 June 1959 | |
| INAS 551 | | Phantoms | de Havilland Vampire | September 1961 – 1965 | Training | 5 September 1961 | |
| INAS 551 | | Phantoms | Hawker Sea Hawk | September 1962 – December 1983 | Training | 5 September 1961 | |
| INAS 551 | | Phantoms | Kiran Mk 1 | 1970 – 1986 | Training | 5 September 1961 | |
| INAS 551 | | Phantoms | Kiran Mk 2 | 1986 – present | Training | 5 September 1961 | |
| INAS 551 | | Phantoms | BAE Sea Harrier (Note: Operated under a sub-squadron INAS 551B. Later rechristened as INAS 552.) | 1990 – 2006 | Training | 5 September 1961 | |
| INAS 551 | | Phantoms | BAE Hawk Mk 132 | November 2013 – present | Training | 5 September 1961 | |
| INAS 551 | | Phantoms | Kiran Mk 2 | May 2003 – 2010 | Aerobatics | 5 September 1961 | |
| INAS 552 | | Braves | BAE Sea Harrier | July 2006 – 2016 | Flight testing | 7 July 2006 | |
| INAS 561* | | Rotors | Hughes S-300 | September 1971 – 1983 | Training | 15 September 1971 | |
| INAS 561* | | Rotors | Alouette III/ HAL Chetak | September 1971 – present | Training | 15 September 1971 | |

== See also ==
- Indian Naval Air Arm
- List of Indian naval aircraft
- List of active Indian Air Force aircraft squadrons

== Notes ==
Footnotes

Citations
