= Indian Naval Air Arm =

- Founded: 1948
- Country: India
- Type: Naval aviation
- Role: Sea-to air-combat, surface attack, anti-submarine warfare, Search and rescue, aerial reconnaissance, weather observation, and material transportation.
- Size: 23 squadrons 5,000 personnel Approx. 300 aircraft
- Part of: Indian Navy

Commanders
- Flag Officer Naval Aviation (FONA): Rear admiral Ajay D. Theophilus

Insignia
- Roundel

- Fin flash

Aircraft flown
- Fighter: Mikoyan MiG-29K,
- Helicopter: HAL Dhruv, Kamov Ka-27, HAL Chetak, MH-60R Seahawk
- Interceptor: Mikoyan MiG-29K
- Patrol: Boeing P-8I, Dornier 228
- Trainer: BAE Hawk, HAL Kiran

The Indian Naval Air Arm is the aviation branch and a fighting arm of the Indian Navy which is tasked to provide an aircraft carrier-based strike capability, fleet air defence, maritime reconnaissance, and anti-submarine warfare.

The Flag Officer Naval Aviation (FONA) appears to direct the field operations of the air arm.

== History ==
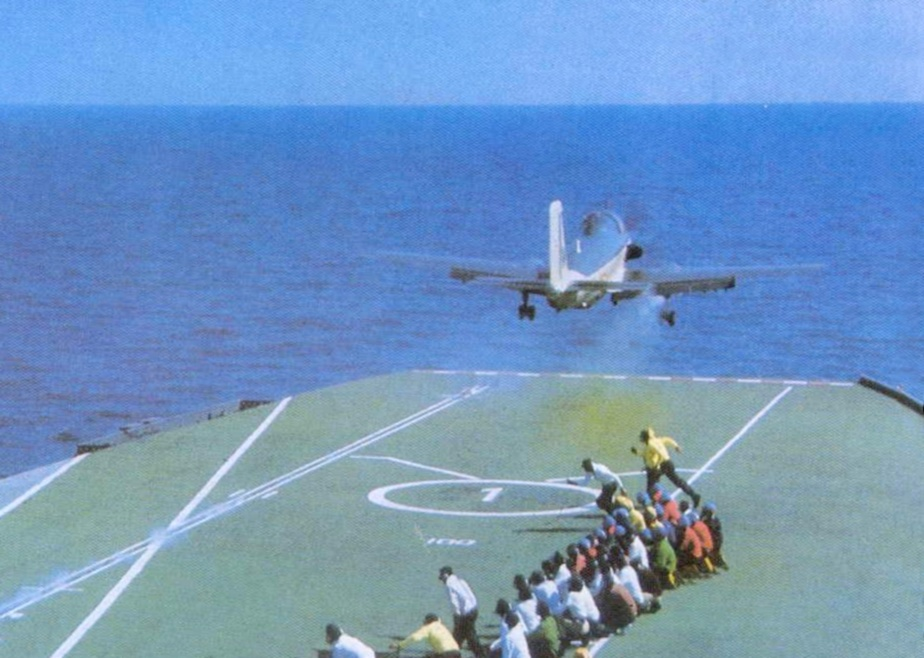
A Bréguet 1050 Alizé anti-submarine aircraft taking off from INS Vikrant

The first naval air station, INS Garuda, was inaugurated in Cochin on 11 May 1953. This went hand-in-hand with the commissioning of the No.550 Squadron, utilising Short Sealand aircraft and Fairey Firefly aircraft

The commissioning of No.300 White Tigers Squadron, consisting of Sea Hawks, happened in 1961.

In 1961, INS Vikrant (formerly HMS Hercules) was acquired by the Indian Navy. Vikrant's initial airwing consisted of British Hawker Sea Hawk fighter-bombers and a French Alize anti-submarine aircraft. On 18 May 1961, the first jet landed on board, piloted by Lieutenant (later Admiral) Radhakrishna Hariram Tahiliani. That year, the No.310 Cobras Squadron (consisting of Alize aircraft) was commissioned. After playing an important role in several major Indian military actions, specifically the Liberation of Goa and the India-Pakistani war of 1971, she was decommissioned in January 1997 and scrapped.

In 1976, the Indian Air Force handed over Super Constellation aircraft to the No.312 Albatross Squadron in Dabolim, Goa. Being fairly old aircraft at that point, these were withdrawn from active service by 1983. To replace them in the maritime patrol role, Soviet aircraft were acquired. The No. 315 Winged Stallions Squadron was commissioned in 1977 with the Ilyushin Il-38 aircraft.

In December 1961, INS Vikrant participated in Operation Vijay, the liberation of Goa from Portugal. Its role was primarily to deter foreign naval intervention during the 40-hour-long military action.

INS Vikrant played a major role in the successful naval blockade of East Pakistan. Stationed off the Andaman & Nicobar Islands escorted by the Leopard-class frigate INS Brahmaputra, as well as INS Beas, Vikrant redeployed towards Chittagong at the outbreak of hostilities.< The morning of 4 December 1971, the eight Sea Hawk aircraft on Vikrant launched an air raid on Cox's Bazar from 60 nautical miles (110 km; 69 mi) away. That evening, the air group struck Chittagong harbour. Other strikes targeted Khulna and Mongla. A PTI message is supposed to have read, "Chittagong harbour ablaze as ships and aircraft of the (Pakistan) Eastern Naval Fleet bombed and rocketed. Not a single vessel can be put to sea from Chittagong". Air strikes staged from Vikrant continued till 10 December 1971.

Given naval intelligence that indicated the intent of the Pakistan Navy to break through the Indian Naval blockade using camouflaged merchant ships, Vikrant's Sea Hawks struck shipping in the Chittagong and Cox's Bazar harbours, sinking or incapacitating most merchant ships there.

The Hughes 269 helicopter was previously in service for training.

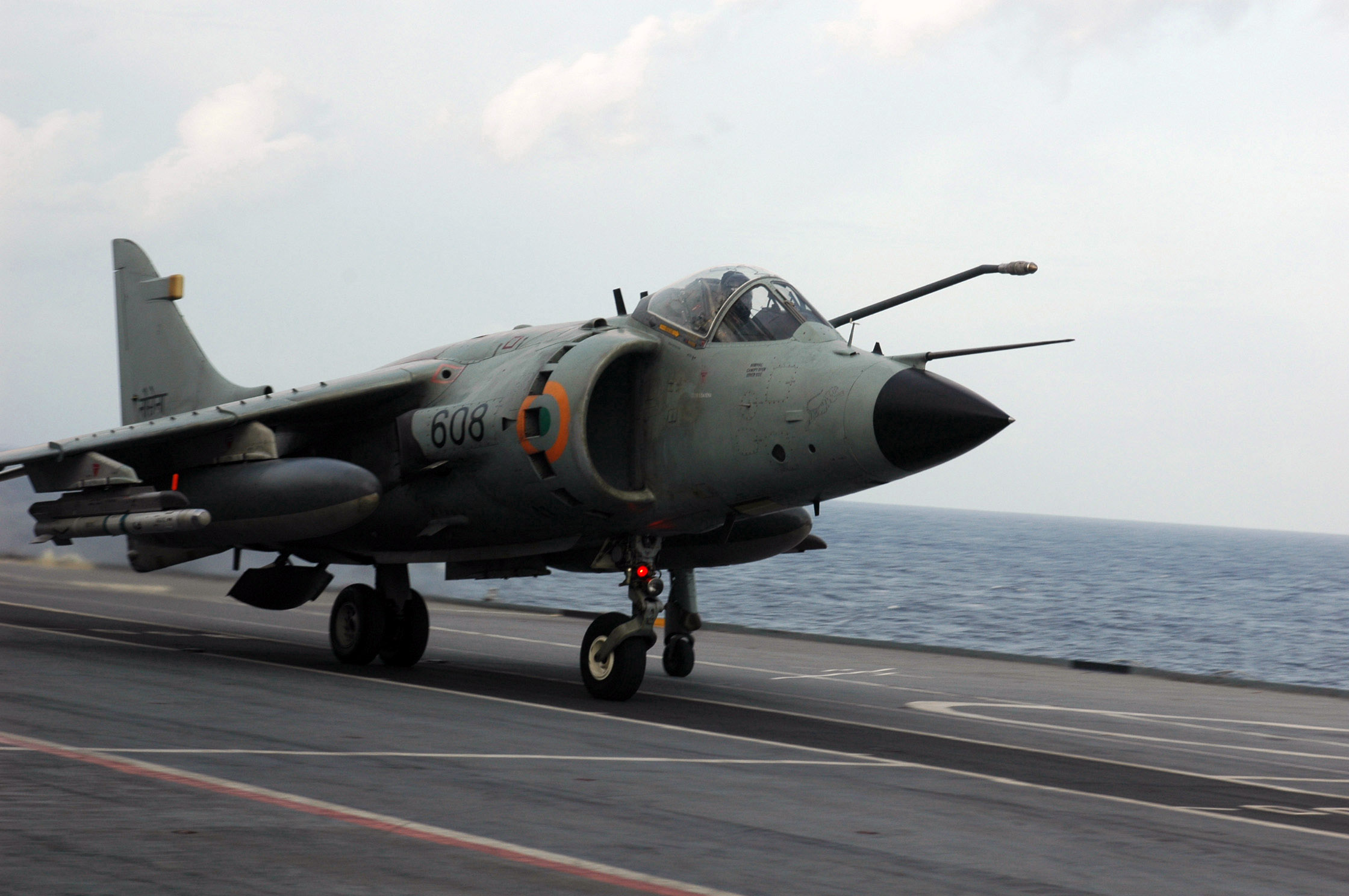
A Sea Harrier takes off from INS Viraat

The BAE Sea Harrier inducted in the 1980s operated from INS Viraat. Until 6 March 2016, the BAE Sea Harrier FRS Mk.51 / T Mk.60 flew with the INAS 300 and INAS 552 squadrons of the Indian Navy. The Sea Harriers are armed with the Matra Magic-II AAM and the Sea Eagle Anti-ship missiles. The aircraft were upgraded with the Elta EL/M-2032 radar and the Rafael Derby BVRAAM missiles.

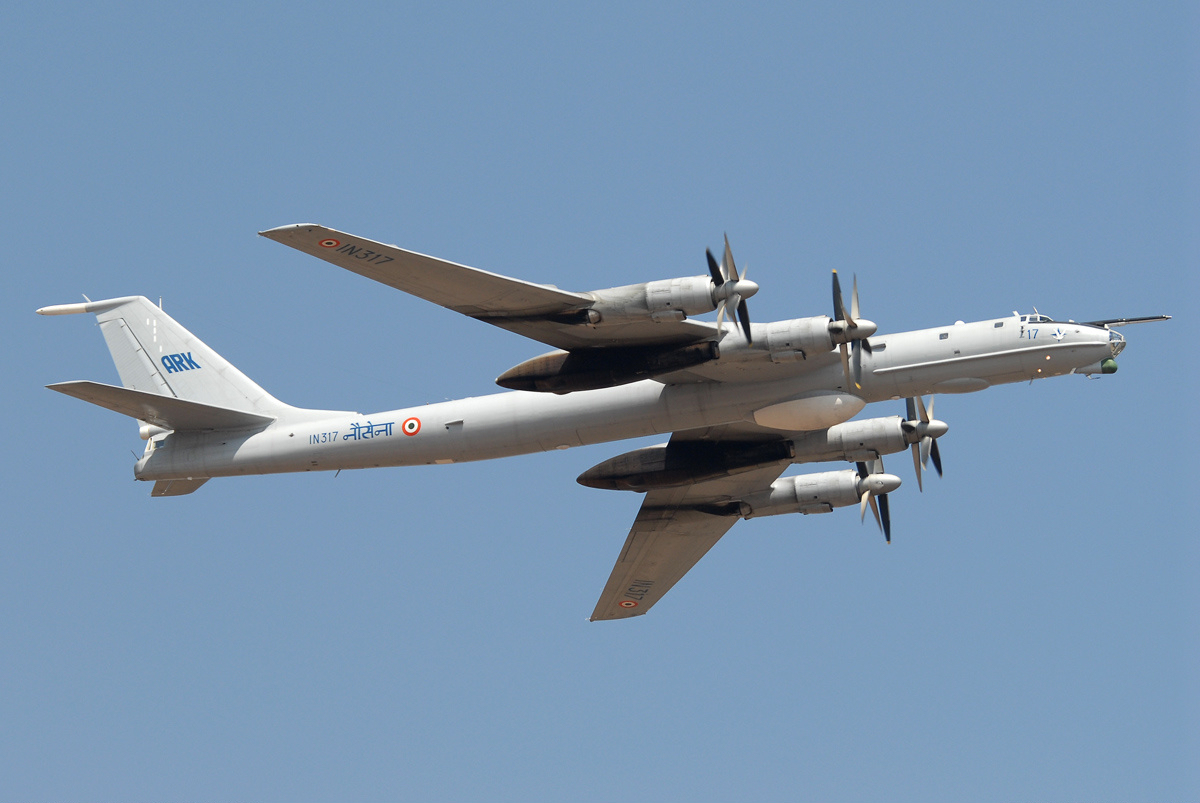
Tu-142MK-E

Year 1988 saw the induction of Tupolev 142M into service. The aircraft started operations from Dabolim in Goa and later shifted its operations to INS Rajali in 1992. Tu-142M was primarily used in the long-range maritime reconnaissance and anti-submarine warfare role. The aircraft served the navy till 2018 and participated in the Indian Peace Keeping Mission in Sri Lanka. Also participated in Operation Cactus in Maldives, in which the fleeing mercenaries were detected and tracked until apprehended by ships.

On 11 May 2013, first squadron of MiG-29K was commissioned. These aircraft were commissioned as a replacement of the ageing Sea Harrier. after 46 years of service the Il-38 patrol aircraft was retired from the force on 31 October 2023. More P-8I aircraft are planned to replace them.

Westland Sea King Mk.42B/C: Used principally for anti-submarine warfare (ASW) and search & rescue roles, the helicopter fleet operate from INS Garuda (Kochi) as well as INS Shikra air stations. US sanctions on India in response to India's nuclear tests resulted in a large part of the Sea King fleet being grounded for want of spare parts. Seventeen of the Sea King helicopters will be upgraded. The upgrade will feature day and night capability, the capability to work in adverse weather conditions, integration of two anti-ship missiles with a range of fifty kilometres and a new radar. The six Mk.42C variants, earlier forming a part of Marine Commando Flight, replaced the UH-3H Sea Kings of the INAS 350 squadron in June 2024. The Mk.42C serves the role of a utility and transport helicopter. After 36 years of service, the Mk.42B fleet was decommissioned on 15 June 2026. This left the Mk.42C fleet in service as the last of the type still in service.

The Naval Aviation Museum located in Bogmalo, 6 km (3.7 mi) from Vasco da Gama, Goa, India showcases the history of the Naval Air Arm.

== Aircraft inventory ==
=== Fixed-wing aircraft ===
==== Mikoyan MiG-29K ====
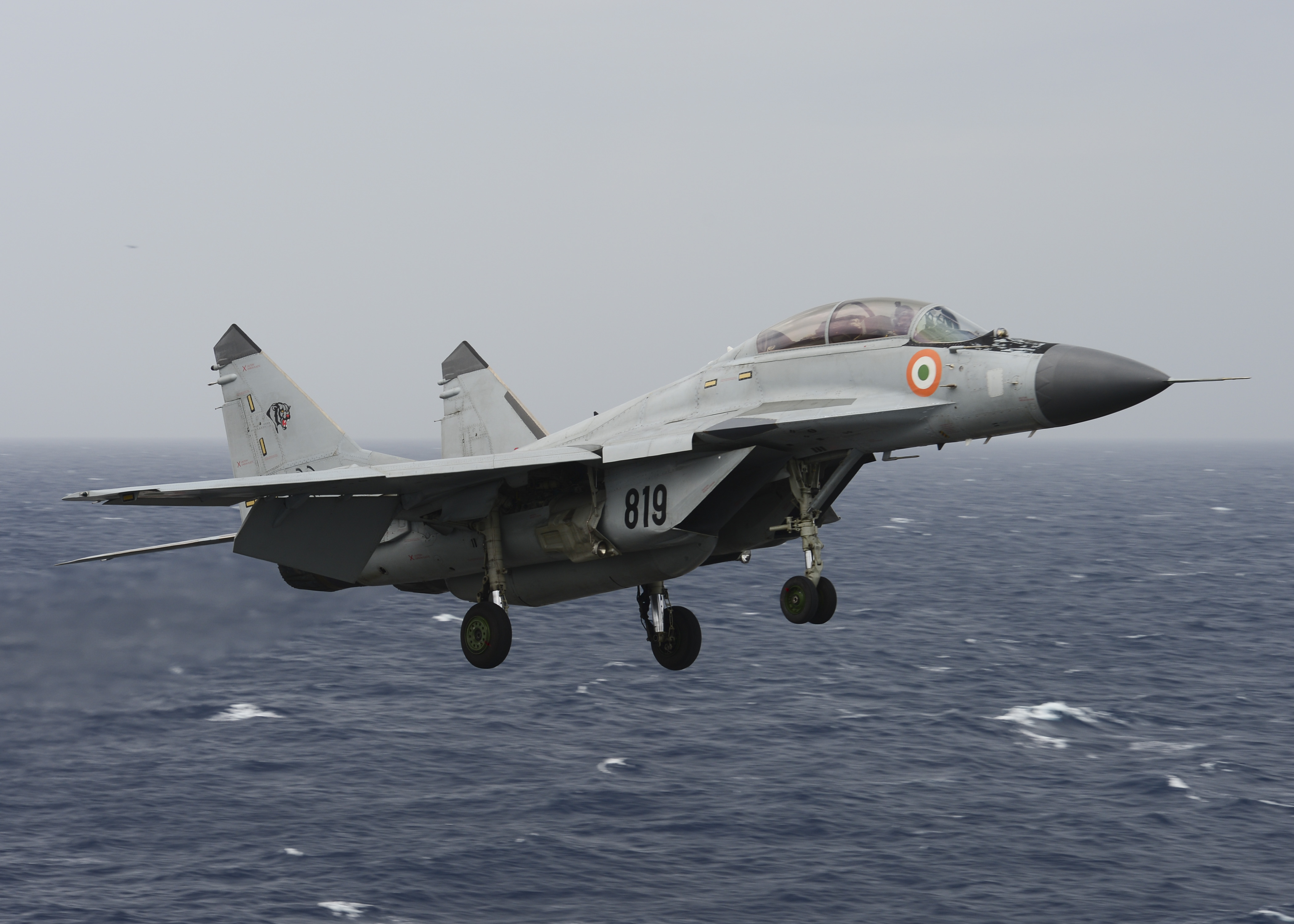
MiG 29K during Malabar 2017 exercise

As reported by MiG Bureau, the Indian Navy's association with the MiG-29K began in Apr 2002 when a team led by Commander Gupta reached Moscow to evaluate the MiG-29K prototype for possible induction into the Indian Navy. The Team evaluated the aircraft on ground as well as in the air (the flight evaluation was conducted by a Navy Test Pilot Commander Ahuja). Some other aircraft were also evaluated but the MiG-29K was chosen. On 20 January 2004, the Indian Navy signed a contract for 12 single-seat MiG-29K and 4 two-seat MiG-29KUB. The first MIG-29K for the Indian Navy took flight on 22 January 2007. The MIG-29 KUB (two-seat trainer) is similar to the MIG-29K but with reduced operational range. The aircraft will be fielded on the aircraft carrier INS Vikramaditya.

The first squadron, INAS 303, the "Black Panthers", was commissioned on 11 May 2013. On 11 July 2016, second squadron, INAS 300, was commissioned. The delivery of the aircraft to the Indian Navy started in 2009.

The fighter plane is different from the MiG-29 flown by Indian Air Force. The aircraft has been modified for aircraft carrier operation by hardening the undercarriage. It also has much better 'over-the-nose' vision to make it easy to land aboard a carrier at a high angle of attack. Modifications made for Indian Navy requirement featured Zhuk-ME radar, RD-33MK engine, combat payload up to 5,500 kg (12,100 lb), 13 hardpoints (inclusive of the multi-lock bomb carriers), additional fuel tanks situated in dorsal spine fairing and wing LERXs, increased total fuel capacity by 50% comparing to first variant of MiG-29 and an updated 4-channel digital fly-by-wire flight control system. With special coatings, the MiG-29K radar reflecting surface is 4–5 times smaller than of basic MiG-29. Cockpit displays consist of wide HUDs, 3 colour LCD MFDs (7 on the MiG-29KUB), a French Sigma-95 satellite GPS module and Topsight E helmet-mounted targeting system compatible with the full range of weapons carried by the MiG-29M and MiG-29SMT.

==== Boeing P-8I Neptune ====
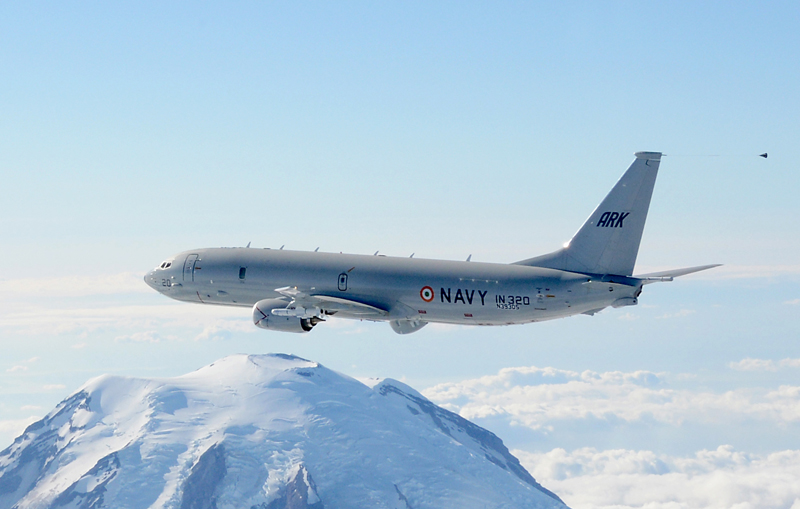
A Boeing P-8I of the Indian Navy

New Delhi and Boeing signed a $2.1 billion contract in January 2009 to deliver eight P-8Is for anti-submarine operations, to replace the ageing fleet of Russian-manufactured Tupolev Tu142M planes. The P-8I varies from the P-8A, wherein it has a Magnetic anomaly detector (MAD) and an aft-mounted radar that provides it with 360-degree aerial radar surveillance capability. It features communication and other devices on board that have been indigenously developed by Bharat Electronics Limited (BEL). The first squadron, INAS 312, was formed with eight aircraft in November 2015. A follow-on order worth over $1 billion for the purchase of four additional P-8Is was signed in July 2016. The Indian Navy decommissioned the Tupolev Tu-142M aircraft in March 2017. With Boeing delivering the 12th and the final P-8I in February 2022, the second squadron, INAS 316, with four aircraft was formed in March 2022.

In 2026, 6 additional P-8Is were ordered.

==== Dornier 228 ====
Indian Navy operates 27 Dornier 228 and in process to induct 8 more state-of-the-art Dornier for anti-submarine warfare and maritime patrol from Hindustan Aeronautics Limited. These aircraft are equipped with advanced sensors, glass cockpit, advanced surveillance radar, ELINT, optical sensors and networking features. Currently 4 of Dornier 228 NG aircraft in service in INAS 314.

=== Helicopters ===
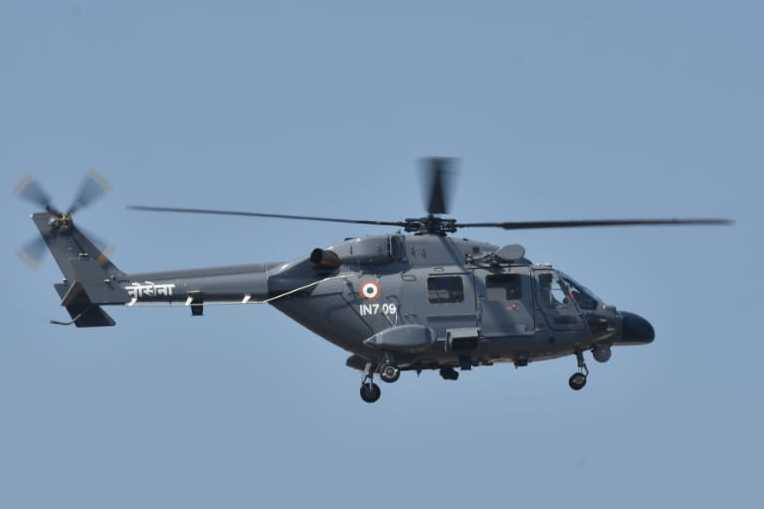
HAL Dhruv MKIII operated by Indian Navy's INAS 323 Harriers squadron.

HAL Dhruv: developed by Hindustan Aeronautics Limited, the Navy received its first Dhruvs on 28 March 2002. It is expected to receive a total of 120 units to replace the Chetak helicopters in service. The naval variant is fitted with the Super Vision-2000 maritime radar, capable of detecting targets with low radar cross-section at a range of 200 km (120 mi). The anti-submarine version of the helicopter is fitted with dunking sonar, torpedoes, depth charges. The helicopter may also be fitted with the missiles for anti-ship roles. However, in 2008, the Indian Navy pronounced Dhruv unsuitable for its role as an ASW platform. Indian Navy will continue to procure Dhruv as a multi-role utility platform. During the commissioning ceremony Vice Admiral Sinha said that "In the Navy, Dhruv helicopters have transformed into an advanced search and rescue (SAR) helicopter also used for missions like heliborne operations, and armed patrol with night vision devices. Such machines in the inventory have become imperative for the Navy given the scenario of low-intensity maritime operations (LIMO) and coastal security construct." In 2013 Indian Navy showed keen interest in the armed version of the HAL Rudra. Impressed with the Dhruv's sensors which were able to track ships and also read their names at ranges of 12 to 14 km (7.5 to 8.7 mi). The Navy may induct 20 more helicopters into service. A new squadron INAS 323 Harriers was commissioned with HAL Dhruv MKIII variant. Navy placed order for 16 MKIII helicopters and 6 of them are delivered with the remaining 10 to be delivered by Dec 2021. Naval variant of MKIII comes with 19 specific systems suited for maritime role.

Kamov Ka-28 and the Kamov Ka-31: The Ka-25 was acquired by the Indian Navy in 1980 for anti-submarine warfare, but had severe technological limitations. The Ka-28s were acquired in the mid-80s and were said to be a quantum leap over their predecessors from an ASW standpoint. The Ka-31 takes the Kamov capabilities even further by enabling real-time network-centric warfare for the Indian Navy.

Westland Sea King Mk.42C: Used principally for anti-submarine warfare (ASW) and search & rescue roles, the helicopter fleet operate from INS Garuda (Kochi) as well as INS Shikra air stations. US sanctions on India in response to India's nuclear tests resulted in a large part of the Sea King fleet being grounded for want of spare parts. Seventeen of the Sea King helicopters were upgraded. The upgrade featured day and night capability, the capability to work in adverse weather conditions, integration of two anti-ship missiles with a range of fifty kilometres and a new radar. The six Mk.42C variants, earlier forming a part of Marine Commando Flight, replaced the UH-3H Sea Kings of the INAS 350 squadron in June 2024. The Mk.42C serves the role of a utility and transport helicopter. After 36 years of service, the Mk.42B helicopters were decommissioned on 15 June 2026, leaving just the Mk.42C in service.

Aérospatiale SA 316 Alouette III: Also known as the Chetak, these choppers have seen active service in the Navy as well as the Coast Guard. They are carried on several combatants as well as non-combatant ships. They are also operated from and maintained at the INS Shikra and INS Utkrosh Naval Air Stations in Mumbai and Port Blair respectively.

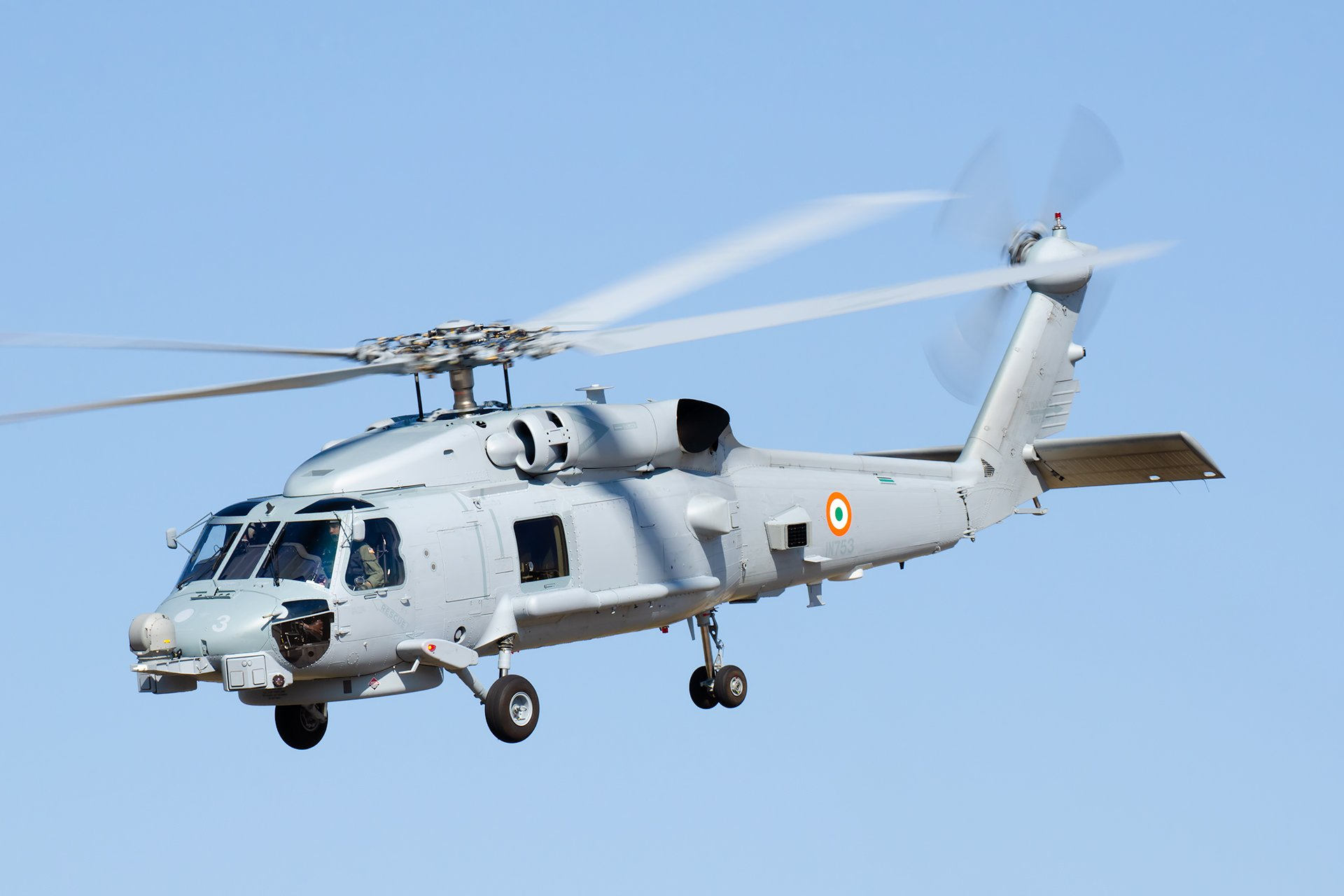
MH-60R Seahawk "Romeo" of Indian Navy

Sikorsky MH-60R Seahawk: The Indian Government signed a $2.4 billion contract in February 2020 for 24 MH-60R helicopters to replace its fleet of Sea King helicopters. The Seahawks will be Indian Navy's primary helicopter for a host of roles including anti-submarine warfare (ASW), anti-surface warfare (ASuW) and airborne early warning and control (AEW&C). The communication equipment like satellite communication and Identification, friend or foe (IFF) equipment for helicopters in this order have been indigenously developed. Deliveries commenced in July 2021 when the first 2 helicopters were handed to the Indian Navy. The helicopter was integrated with INS Vikrant in May 2023 with its maiden landing on the aircraft carrier. The first squadron, INAS 334, was formed with six helicopters in March 2024, at Kochi. All remaining helicopters to be delivered by 2025.

=== UAVs ===
The Indian Navy operates at least two squadrons of Heron and Searcher Mk-II UAVs, based in Kochi (INAS 342) and Porbandar (INAS 343). There are plans to have at least two more squadrons of UAVs. UAVs are controlled from ships to increases the range of surveillance. There are plans to introduce rotary UAVs into the Indian Navy. These UAVs will have higher endurance and load carrying capability resulting in better reconnaissance capabilities. Indian Navy operates 2 leased MQ-9 Reaper for maritime surveillance in the Indian Ocean region. The service also operates a Drishti-10 Starliner from Porbandar for ISR missions.

== Training ==
- Fighter: As of 2024, INAS 551 is a pure shore-based fighter training squadron at INS Dega. Fighter pilots initially join this squadron for Naval Orientation Flying before being selected for undergoing conversion training for Mikoyan MiG-29Ks at INAS 300. Later the pilots are qualified for operational service with MiG-29Ks with INAS 303.
- Fixed-wing: INAS 550 provides Dornier Operational Flying Training to fixed wing pilots at INS Garuda. The pilots are then further posted to operational squadrons equipped with Short Range Maritime Reconnaissance (SRMR) aircraft Dornier 228 (INAS 310, 311, 313, 314, 318) or Long Range Maritime Reconnaissance (LRMR) aircraft Boeing P-8I Neptune (INAS 312, 316). The squadron shall also impart training to pilots of Medium Range Maritime Reconnaissance (MRMR) aircraft EADS CASA C-295 planned to be inducted in future.
- Helicopter: INAS 561 acts as the Helicopter Training School (HTS) for training rotary-wing aircraft pilots and is based at INS Rajali. The pilots are trained for different roles like fleet support, MEDEVAC as well as Search and Rescue. They are also trained for operating from various types of platforms like shore bases, ships and even oil rigs. The pilots after graduation are posted to squadrons operating single engine helicopters like HAL Chetak (INAS 321). Later, pilots with adequate experience on HAL Chetaks are allotted to twin-engine helicopter squadrons. These include Sea King (INAS 336, 339 and 350), Kamov Ka-31 (INAS 339), Kamov Ka-28 (INAS 333) and HAL Dhruv (INAS 322, 323 and 324).

== Retired aircraft ==
Aircraft	Role	Squadrons	No.	Service from	Service till	Notes
Short Sealand	Amphibious seaplane	INAS 550	10	1953	N/A	
Fairey Firefly	Target tugging	INAS 550	10	1955	N/A	IN116 crashed, IN112 preserved in Naval Aviation Museum
Hawker Sea Hawk FGA.6	Carrier-based fighter	INAS 300, INAS 551	36	1960	1983	Operated from INS Vikrant. There are several surviving aircraft.
Bréguet 1050 Alizé	Carrier-based ASW aircraft	INAS 310	14	1961	1991	Operated from INS Vikrant. One unit preserved in Naval Aviation Museum.
Hughes 269C	Helicopter training	N/A	N/A	N/A	N/A	One unit preserved in Naval Aviation Museum.
HAL HPT-32 Deepak	Basic Trainer	N/A	N/A	8	N/A	N/A
Lockheed L-1049 Super Constellation	Maritime patrol aircraft	INAS 312	N/A	1976	1983	IN315 preserved in Naval Aviation Museum. Replaced by Tupolev Tu-142.
BAe Sea Harrier FRS.51	Carrier-based fighter	INAS 300, INAS 551, INAS 552	30	1988	2016	Operated from INS Viraat and initially from INS Vikrant. During retirement, 12 remained in service.
Tupolev Tu-142MK-E	Maritime patrol aircraft, ASW aircraft	INAS 312	8	1988	2017	Replaced by Boeing P-8I Neptune. Two units preserved including Beach Road, Visakhapatnam and New Town, Kolkata.
Ilyushin Il-38SD	Maritime patrol aircraft, ASW aircraft	INAS 315	5	1977	2023	Could carry 2 Sea Eagle and Kh-35E AShM. IN302 and IN304 crashed in 2002. Replaced by Boeing P-8I Neptune.
IAI Searcher MkII	Reconnaissance UAV	INAS 342	8	2002	2024	
Sikorsky UH-3H Sea King	Utility helicopter	INAS 350	6	2009	2024	Six were bought along with INS Jalashwa (L41). In 2024, three remaining units were replaced by Sea King 42C.
Westland Sea King Mk.42B	Anti-surface warfare Anti-submarine warfare	INAS 330	6–8	1971	2026	The squadron operated 6 to 8 aircraft. Other helicopters of the same variant remain in service.

== Future ==
During Aero India 2025, the Chief of Naval Staff Admiral Dinesh K Tripathi and Minister of State for Defence Sanjay Seth released a vision document for naval aviation named Atmanirbhar Indian Naval Aviation Technology Roadmap, 2047. The roadmap focused on being equipping the Naval Air Arm with a 400 aircraft strong fleet capable of network-cetric operations and indigenising the entire fleet by 2047. As per the document, the Navy will induct multiple aircraft types over the next two decades which include:

- fifth generation twin engine deck-based fighter multirole aircraft (replacing the current fighter fleet)
- Long Range, Medium Range and Short Range Maritime Reconnaissance Aircraft
- Aircraft Carrier-Borne Airborne Early Warning and Control Aircraft
- Amphibious aircraft
- Air-to-Air Refueller Aircraft (manned or uncrewed)
- Multirole and heavy lift helicopters
- different types of remotely piloted aircraft and unmanned aerial systems.

=== Future acquisition ===
Type	Picture	Role	No. of airframes	Origin	Status	Note
Combat
Twin Engine Deck Based Fighter (TEDBF)		Carrier-based multirole fighter	N/A	India	Design Phase	The first flight of the TEDBF is targeted for 2032–33 with the fighter expected to be inducted into the Navy by 2038.
Dassault Rafale		Carrier-based multirole fighter	26	France	On order	The acquisition is a part of the Multi-Role Carrier Borne Fighters programme to acquire 57 fighter jets for the carrier air wing of INS Vikrant. The quantity was revised to 26 jets. Rafale-M was chosen over the Boeing F/A-18E/F Super Hornet in 2023. The deal was signed in April 2025, with first aircraft delivery expected in August–September 2026, as of 23 March 2026.
UAV
Naval Shipborne Unmanned Aerial System (NSUAS)		Unmanned Rotorcraft/Shipborne UAV	40		Planned	Proposal to buy 10 NSUAS for around ₹ 1,300 crores cleared by the government in 2021. RFI to purchase total of 40 units released in 2023. The Defence Acquisition Council (DAC) cleared the procurement project for the Navy in July 2026.
Multi Utility Long Endurance Drone (MULE)		Unmanned Rotorcraft/Shipborne UAV			Under development	Contract signed with Altair Infrasec for MULE RPA which will be a NSUAS class UAV.: Primary Roles: C4, ISTAR, SIGNIT, COMINT and Maritime Domain Awareness (MDA) operations for a Task Force. Secondary Roles: Anti-piracy, Anti-terrorist activities and assistance in Search and Rescue (SAR). Payloads: EO/IR, AIS, Maritime Patrol Radar, EW and communication relay with a capacity of >50 kg (110 lb). Endurance: >12 hours.
IAI-HAL NRUAV		Unmanned Rotorcraft/Shipborne UAV		IndiaIsrael	Planned	
MQ-9B SeaGuardian		Unmanned combat aerial vehicle	2 in service (on lease) 15 more on order.	United States	On order	The deal was signed on 15 October 2024. Deliveries to begin from January 2029.
Medium Altitude Long Endurance Drone (MALE)		Unmanned aerial vehicle			Planned	Defence Acquisition Council (DAC) approved the procurement of 87 Medium Altitude Long Endurance (MALE) drones for the Indian Armed Forces.
NewSpace Abhimanyu		Loyal wingman/ Unmanned combat aerial vehicle		India	Under Development	Contract signed for development and procurement of specified number of systems.
NewSpace Arka		High altitude pseudo-satellite		India	Under Development	Contract signed for design & development of indigenous High Altitude Pseudo-Satellite (HAPS) for Indian Navy.
Medium Range Loitering Munition [LM(MR)]		Loitering munition			Planned	RFI issued in September 2026. Ideal specifications include:– Range: >1,000 km, Endurance: >9 hours, Length: <2.5 m, Wingspan: <3 m, Sensors: Modular (with EO/IR seeker for ISR and targeting). Features: autonomous navigation (GNSS-denied), canister-launched, up to 10 munitions simultaneously managed by mission control unit, control hand-off between ship and land stations.
Patrol / Utility
Boeing P-8I Neptune		Reconnaissance, ASW, ASuW	12 in service	United States	6 approved Awaiting CCS approval	The deal was approved by the Ministry of Defence on 12 February 2025.
Airbus C-295		Anti-submarine warfare/ Maritime patrol	9	European Union; India	Planned	Medium-range maritime reconnaissance (MRMR) aircraft: They will be equipped with advanced sensors, glass cockpit, advanced surveillance radar, ELINT, optical sensors and networking features. Ministry of Defence has given clearance for procurement on 16 February 2024.
Dornier 228		Anti-submarine warfare, Maritime patrol	12	India	(as of 2019) 4 in service 8 on order (upgraded variants)	These aircraft will be equipped with advanced sensors, glass cockpit, advanced surveillance radar, ELINT, optical sensors and networking features.
		STOL Amphibious Aircraft	4		Planned	On 7 January 2026, the Navy released an RFI to lease 4 amphibious aircraft for 4 years. The document is meant to seek the types available in the market and their capabilities. India had previously looked to purchase Shinmayawa US-2 floatplanes from Japan.
Helicopter
Sikorsky MH-60R		Multi-Role Helicopter	24	United States	22 delivered.	The helicopters will replace the aging Sea King Mk.42/A helicopters which were retired in the 1990s.: They are equipped with Mark 54 torpedoes and Hellfire air-to-surface missiles, along with precision-kill rockets. India signed a ₹15,157 crore (equivalent to ₹190 billion or US$2.1 billion in 2026) contract for the MH-60Rs in February 2020.
Deck Based Multi Role Helicopter		Multi-Role Helicopter	66	India	Under development	It is the naval variant of the IMRH. The Navy joined the programme in July 2021. As of July 2025, the configuration studies are underway.
Naval Multi-Role Helicopter		Multi-Role Helicopter	123	India	Planned	Previous tender: The first tender under Multi Role Helicopter (MRH) programme was issued in 2006. The same was cancelled and re-issued in September 2008. Sikorsky S-70B Seahawk and NHIndustries NH90 completed technical trials in 2011. The programme was delayed due to "undue technical waivers" complaints by NHI in 2012 and 2013 corruption allegations. The S-70B was selected in 2014. However, the deal was terminated due to overpricing and negotiation deadlock.; Stopgap measure: 24 MH-60Rs were sought through the FMS route in 2018–19. The deal was signed in February 2020. The deliveries are expected to be complete by 2026-end.; The NMRH is the successor to the MRH programme seeking to replace the Sea King Mk 42B/C fleet. Current status: June 2011 – an RFI for a requirement of 75 naval multi-role helicopter in the 9–12.5t class. 22 August 2017 – An RFI was issued to acquire 123 Naval Multi-Role Helicopter (NMRH), besides 111 Naval Utility Helicopters (NUH), through the Strategic Partnership model. The last date for the foreign OEMs to respond was 6 October. 33 would be dedicated to MARCOS use. The payload is expected to include 12 fully equipped troops, 400 kg equipment or 8 troops and an auto inflatable craft in a stowed configuration.
Naval Utility Helicopter		Utility helicopter	51	India	Planned	First attempt: March 2010 – the Navy decided to not induct any further HAL Dhruv choppers and seek helicopters for utility and ASW roles as well as replace Chetak fleet to meet the long-term requirements. May 2010 – An RFI was issued 56 naval light utility helicopters with a gross weight of 4,500 kg (9,900 lb) and folding rotor blades to replace the HAL Chetak fleet. 2012 – An RfP (tender) was issued to AgustaWestland, Bell Helicopter, Boeing, Eurocopter, Kamov and Sikorsky to procure 56 Naval Utility Helicopters (NUH) at a cost of $1 billion by 2016. The deadline was January 2013. Likely contenders included AS565, S-76B and AW109 Koala LUH but not Dhruv. August 2014 – Tender cancelled along with the reconnaissance & surveillance helicopter (RSH) programme. The helicopter count was increased to 100.; Second attempt: 2015–16 – The Union government was expected to restart the NUH tender under the Make in India mode with foreign collaboration at a cost of over $2 billion. Reportedly, 11 Indian private sector companies including Tata Advanced Systems, Bharat Forge, Mahindra Aerospace, Reliance Defence & Aerospace and Larsen & Toubro were expected to respond with proposed joint ventures to offer Airbus AS565 MBe, Bell 429 and AgustaWestland Super Lynx 300. The Navy had a deficit of 61 shipborne helicopters. 22 August 2017 – An RFI was issued to acquire 111 Naval Utility Helicopters (NUH), besides 123 Naval Multi-Role Helicopter (NMRH), through the Strategic Partnership model. The last date for the foreign OEMs to respond was 6 October. 25 August 2018 – The Defence Acquisition Council (DAC) cleared the ₹21,738 crore (US$3.34 billion). While 16 would be imported in flyaway manner, the rest would be produced in India. The RfP would be issued in mid-2018. The weight would remain the same as the previous tender. The armament include one lightweight torpedo, 12.7 mm heavy machine guns and rocket launchers on both sides for light attack and ASW roles. The helicopter would be wheeled and have foldable rotor blades. 12 February 2019 – The RfP was published for the foreign OEMs and domestic Strategic Partners.; Third attempt: 7 April 2022 – The NUH was included into the third positive indigenisation list, eliminating direct participation by any foreign vendor. The Navy had issued the broad requirement of 60 ALH-based helicopters to HAL in January 2022. A detail project report for helicopter configuration, overall cost, including performance based logistics was prepared for the Navy HQ and MoD. This resulted in the concept of Utility Helicopter-Marine.; To replace HAL Chetak fleet across Navy and Coast Guard. Current status: August 2025 – the MoD released an RFI to procure 76 Naval Utility Helicopters meant for the Navy (51) and the Coast Guard (25). These will be assigned for roles like maritime SAR, CASEVAC, communication duties, and low-intensity maritime operations. Competitors – Utility Helicopter-Marine from HAL. Produced in India variant of AW169M design from Leonardo and Adani Defence & Aerospace. Procurement from US, France being reportedly considered.
Boeing V-22 Osprey		Tiltrotor military transport aircraft	N/A	United States	Planned	Indian navy had proposed to acquire the V-22's airborne early warning and control variant to replace the short-range Kamov Ka-31.

== Structure ==
Flag Officer Naval Aviation (FONA) controls training, maintenance and other functions of naval aviation. Aircraft yards at Kochi, Kerala and Dabolim, Goa are responsible for maintaining the fleet's air arm. An exclusive base, INS Shikra for helicopters was commissioned in Mumbai.

To protect and preserve India's growing trade with Southeast Asia and offer a defence against increasing Chinese naval presence in the Bay of Bengal, a new naval base is being built near Visakhapatnam. It is expected to be capable of harbouring two aircraft carriers, including the planned new Vikrant-class aircraft carrier. There are two more naval air stations, INS Rajali and INS Parundu in Tamil Nadu.

Southern Command has at least one airfield, INS Garuda, in Kochi, Kerala. The Hindu reported on 2 February 2009 that a new airbase will be set up in Muscat, Oman to tackle piracy in the Gulf of Aden. Three years later in 2012 it is not clear whether any action has been taken on this proposal. The southernmost naval air station, INS Baaz was formally opened on 31 July 2012 by the Chief of the Indian Navy at Cambell Bay in Andaman and Nicobar Islands. With the commissioning of this station, the country acquired increased capability to keep vigil on the vital maritime channel of the Straits of Malacca.

== Notable members ==
Four naval aviators have risen to become the Chief of the Naval Staff (CNS) - Admirals R. H. Tahiliani, Arun Prakash, Sureesh Mehta and Karambir Singh.

- Admiral Radhakrishna Hariram Tahiliani - the first naval aviator to serve as Chief of the Naval Staff.
- Vice Admiral Mihir K. Roy - the first observer of the Indian Navy and the first aviator to command the aircraft carrier INS Vikrant (1961).
- Admiral Arun Prakash - the first Commander-in-Chief of the Andaman and Nicobar Command and the second aviator to rise to be CNS.
- Vice Admiral Shekhar Sinha - the first naval aviator to serve as Chief of Integrated Defence Staff.
- Admiral Karambir Singh - the first helicopter aviator to become Chief of the Naval Staff (India)

== See also ==
Indian navy related lists

- List of active aircraft of the Indian Naval Air Arm
- List of Indian Navy bases
- List of active Indian Navy ships
- List of ships of the Indian Navy
- List of submarines of the Indian Navy

Other Indian navy related

- Naval ranks and insignia of India
- Indian maritime history
- Future of the Indian Navy
- Indian Coast Guard
- Middle Ground Coastal Battery
- Naval Aviation Museum (Goa)
- Naval Aircraft Museum (Kolkata)

Indian military related

- Army Aviation Corps (India)
- India-China Border Roads
- Indian military satellites
- List of active Indian military aircraft
- List of Indian Air Force stations
- India's overseas military bases
- Indian Nuclear Command Authority
