= List of pilot training institutes in India =

Flying schools in India

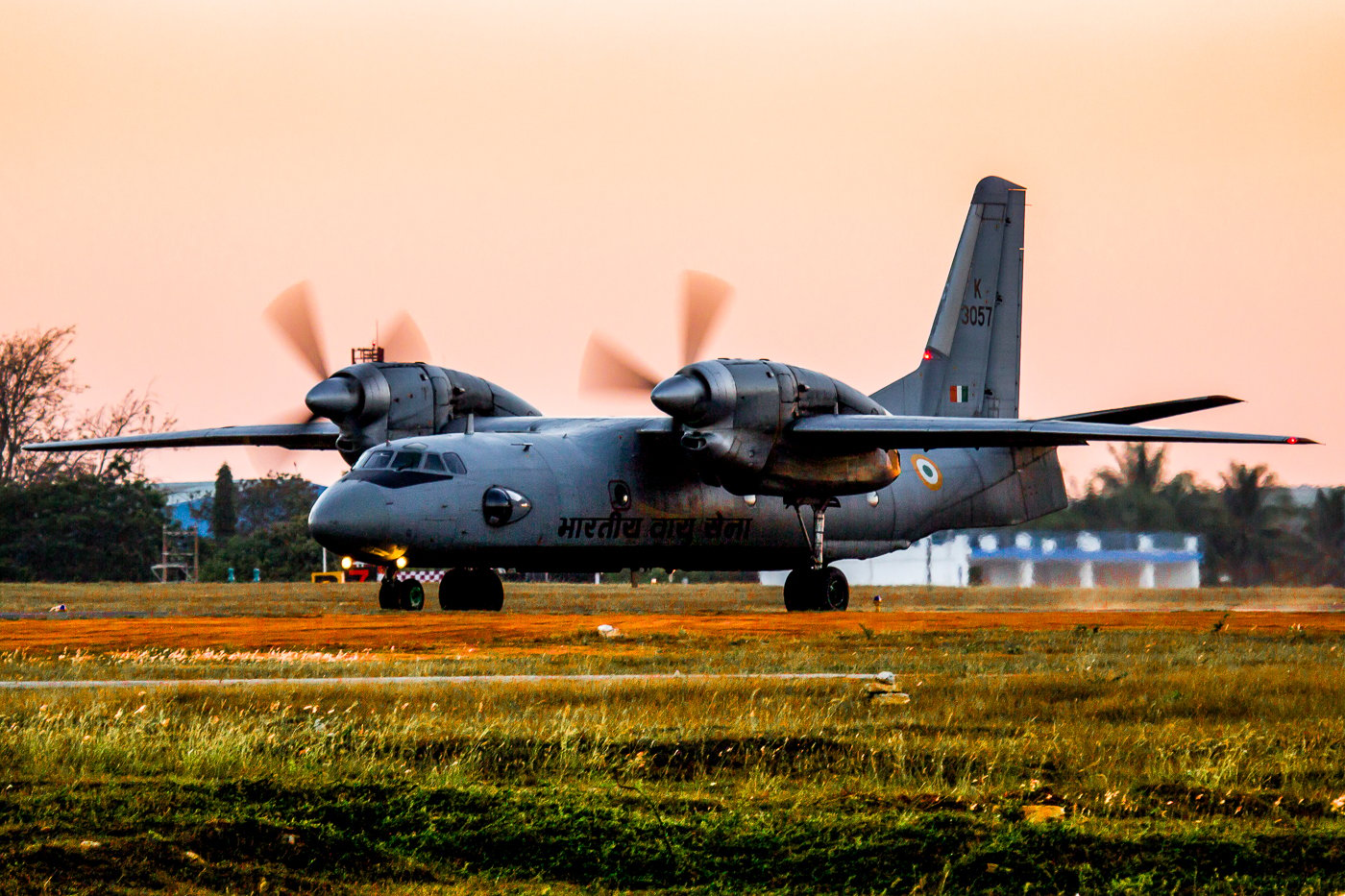
Antonov An-32 transport aircraft of the Indian Air Force

In India, civil aviation is regulated by the Directorate General of Civil Aviation (DGCA) which recognizes 35 (as of 2023) Flying Training Organisations (FTO) for flight training and seven (including one in Singapore) Aircraft Type Training Organisations or Approved Training Organisations (ATO) for type rating. In Indian Armed Forces, aircraft are used by the Indian Air Force, the Army Aviation Corps, the Indian Naval Air Arm, and the Indian Coast Guard, who train officers at their military establishments.

== Civil aviation ==
=== Flying Training Organisations ===
List of approved FTOs as of April 2025
Institute	City Airstrip	State/UT	Type	Notes
Academy of Carver Aviation	Baramati	Maharashtra	Private	
Alchemist Aviation		Jharkhand	Private	
Ambitions Flying Club	Karad	Maharashtra	Private	
Asia Pacific Flight Training Academy		Telangana	Private	Other base in Karnataka
Avyanna Aviation		Rajasthan	Private	
Banasthali Vidyapith Gliding & Flying Club		Rajasthan	Society	
Bihar Flying Institute		Bihar	State-owned	
Blue Ray Aviation		Gujarat	Private	
Bombay Flying Club	Mumbai	Maharashtra	Society	The oldest flying club in India
Chetak Aviation		Uttar Pradesh	Society	
Chimes Aviation Academy		Madhya Pradesh	Private	
Dunes Aviation Academy		Gujarat	Trust	
EKVI Air Training Organisation		Tamil Nadu	Private	
Falcon Aviation Academy		Uttar Pradesh	Trust	Other base in Madhya Pradesh
Flytech Aviation Academy		Telangana	Private	Other base in Andhra Pradesh
FSTC Flying School		Haryana	Private	Subsidiary of type rating company FSTC
Garg Aviation		Uttar Pradesh	Private	
Government Aviation Training Institute		Odisha	State-owned	
Government Flying Training School		Karnataka	State-owned	
The Gujarat Flying Club		Gujarat	Trust	
Haryana Institute of Civil Aviation		Haryana	State-owned	
Indian Flying Academy		Madhya Pradesh	Private	
Indira Gandhi Rashtriya Uran Akademi		Uttar Pradesh	Centre-owned	Autonomous institution under the Ministry of Civil Aviation; Other bases in Karnataka and Maharashtra
Jet Serve Aviation		Madhya Pradesh	Private	Other base in Maharashtra
The Madhya Pradesh Flying Club		Madhya Pradesh	Trust	
Nagpur Flying Club	Nagpur	Maharashtra	State-owned	
National Flying Training Institute	Gondia	Maharashtra	Private	Joint venture between CAE Inc. and Airports Authority of India
Orient Flights Aviation Academy		Karnataka	Private	
Patiala Aviation Club		Punjab	State-owned	
Pioneer Flying Academy		Uttar Pradesh	Private	
Pilot360 Fly Safer		Gujarat	Private	
Rajiv Gandhi Academy for Aviation Technology		Kerala	State-owned	
Redbird Flight Training Academy	Baramati	Maharashtra	Private	Other bases in Assam, Karnataka, and Madhya Pradesh
Sha-Shib Flying Academy		Madhya Pradesh	Society	
Saraswati Aviation Academy		Uttar Pradesh	Trust	
Sha-Shib Flying Academy		Madhya Pradesh	Society	
Skynex Aero Pvt. Ltd.		Delhi	Private	
SVKM NMIMS Academy of Aviation	Shirpur	Maharashtra	Private	
Telangana State Aviation Academy		Telangana	State-owned	
Vision Flying Training Institute		Gujarat	Trust	
Wings Aviation		Telangana	Private	

=== Aircraft Type Training Organisations ===
List of approved ATOs as of 2025
Institute	Aircraft	Note
Aag Centre for Aviation	A320	
Airbus	A320	
Boeing	B737 MAX, B777. B787	Singapore; India's only foreign ATO
CSTPL	A320, B737-NG	
CTE, Air India	A320, ATR 72-600, B777, B787	
FSTC India	A320, ATR 72-600, B737-NG, Q400	Also approved by EASA for A320neo
Hatsoff Helicopter Training	AS365 Dauphin, Bell 412, HAL Dhruv	Joint venture between Hindustan Aeronautics and CAE Inc

== Military aviation ==
=== Army Aviation Corps ===
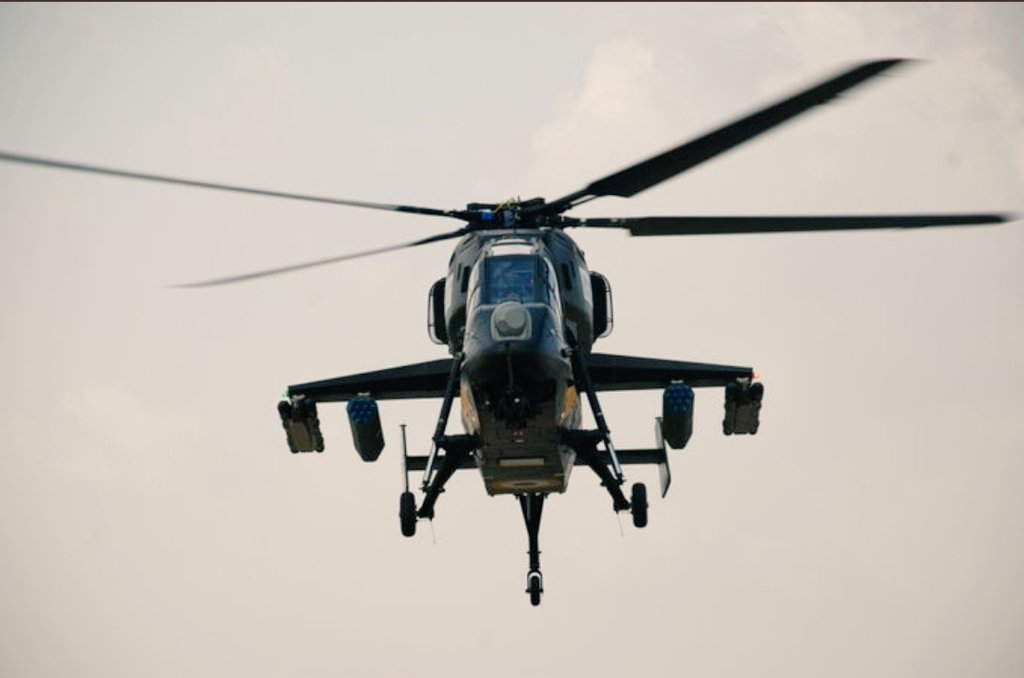
HAL Light Combat Helicopter of the Army Aviation Corps

Army Aviation Corps is the aviation branch of the Indian Army. Their inventory consists of helicopters.

School	Location	Note
Basic Flying Training School	Prayagraj	Indian Air Force station
Combat Army Aviation Training School	Nashik	Main training school

=== Indian Air Force ===
Training Command is responsible for training Indian Air Force officers who are trained at Flying Training Establishments (FTE). Officers undergo basic Stage-I training at the Air Force Academy and after trifurcating them into Fighter, Transport, and Helicopter streams, they are sent to the respective FTEs for Stage-II (advanced) and Stage-III (specialization) training.

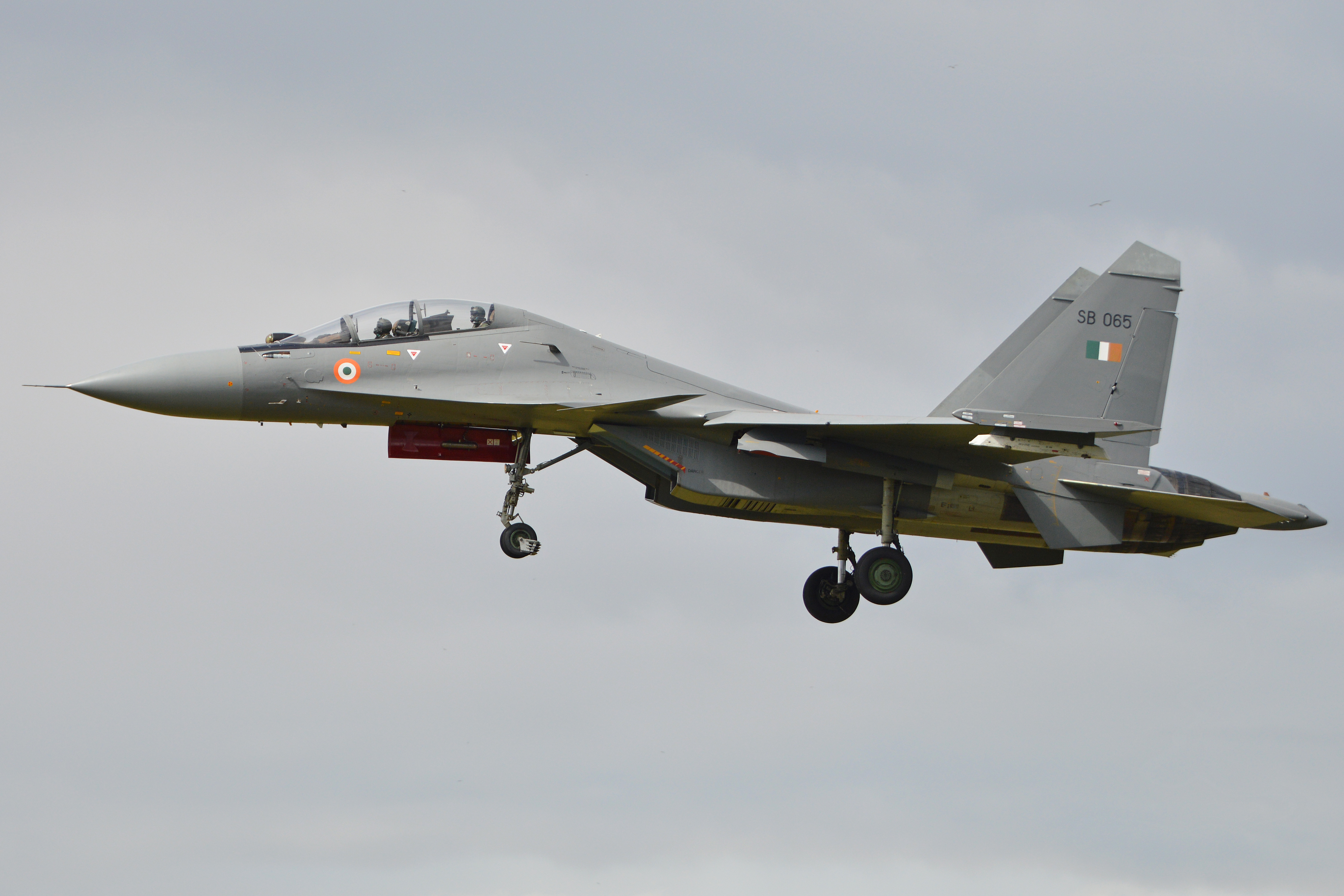
Sukhoi Su-30 combat aircraft of IAF

School	Station	Level	Stream	Note
Air Force Academy	Dundigal AFS	Stage I	—N/a	Common to all officers
Air Force School	Kalaikunda AFS	Stage III	Fighter	
Fighter Training Wing	Hakimpet AFS	Stage II	Fighter	
Helicopter Training School	Hakimpet AFS	Stage II	Helicopter	
Hawk Operational Training Squadron	Bidar AFS	Stage III	Fighter	
Weapon System Operators' School	Bidar AFS	Stage III	Fighter	Weapon systems officer training
Fixed Wing Training Faculty	Yelahanka AFS	Stage II; Stage III	Transport	
No. 112 Helicopter Unit, IAF	Yelahanka AFS	Stage III	Helicopter	

=== Indian Naval Air Arm ===
Indian Naval Air Arm is the naval aviation branch of the Indian Navy. Officers undergo a mandatory Naval Orientation Course at the Indian Naval Academy and take a pre-flying training at School for Naval Airmen and are send to either Air Force Academy or Indira Gandhi Rashtriya Uran Akademi for ab-initio flying training. On completion, they are trifurcated into Fighter, Fixed wing, and Rotary wing streams and send to respective training stations for advanced training and specialization.

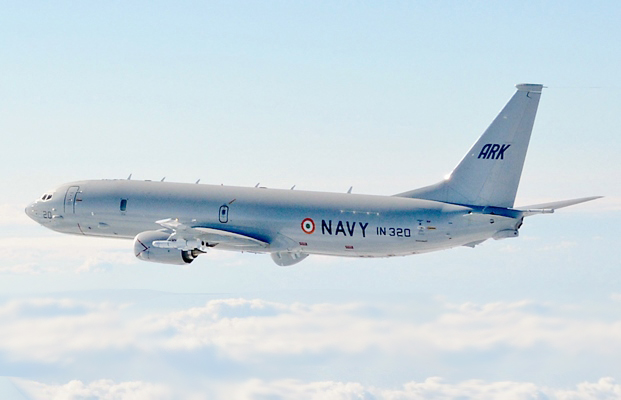
Boeing P-8I of the Indian Naval Air Arm for maritime patrol

School	Location	Stream	Notes
Air Force Academy	Dundigal	—N/a	Indian Air Force station
Fixed Wing Training Faculty	Yelahanka AFS	Fixed wing	Indian Air Force station
Helicopter Training School	INS Rajali	Rotary wing	
INAS 322	INS Garuda	Rotary wing	Operational conversion to multi-engine helicopters
INAS 330	INS Shikra	Rotary wing	Operational conversion to multi-engine helicopters
INAS 333	INS Dega	Rotary wing	Operational conversion to multi-engine helicopters
INAS 336	INS Garuda	Rotary wing	Operational conversion to multi-engine helicopters
INAS 339	INS Hansa	Rotary wing	Operational conversion to multi-engine helicopters
INAS 550	INS Venduruthy	Fixed wing	Dornier Operational Flying Training course
INAS 551	INS Dega	Fighter	Naval Orientation Flying in advanced jet trainer
INAS 300	INS Hansa	Fighter	Operational conversion to MiGs
Indira Gandhi Rashtriya Uran Akademi	Fursatganj Airfield	—N/a	
School for Naval Airmen	INS Garuda	—N/a	Pre-flying training

=== Indian Coast Guard ===
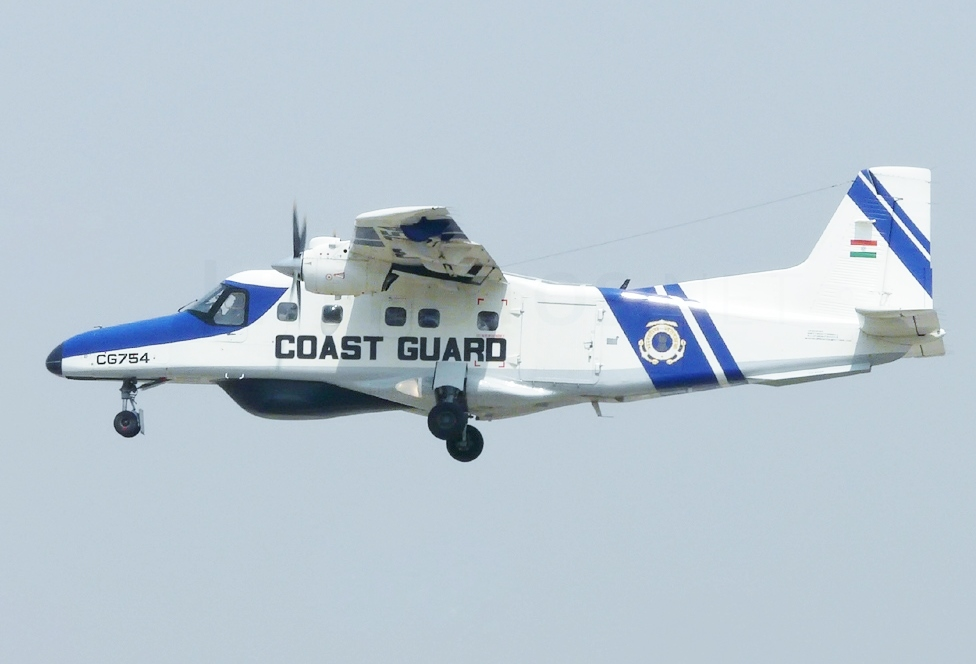
Indian Coast Guard's Dornier 228 aircraft for maritime patrol

School	Location	Stream	Notes
Air Force Academy	Dundigal	—N/a	Indian Air Force station
Coast Guard Flying Training Squadron	Daman	Fixed wing	
Helicopter Training School	INS Rajali	Rotary wing	
Indian Coast Guard Academy	Mangaluru	—N/a	Under construction
Indira Gandhi Rashtriya Uran Akademi	Fursatganj Airfield	—N/a	

== See also ==
- Military academies in India
- List of airlines of India
- List of airports in India
- List of active Indian military aircraft
- List of Indian naval air squadrons
