= INAS 550 =

- Active: 15 June 1959 - present
- Country: India
- Branch: Indian Navy
- Garrison/HQ: INS Garuda, Kochi
- Nickname: The Flying Fish

Aircraft flown
- Reconnaissance: Britten-Norman Islander (historical); Dornier 228; Pipistrel Virus

The INAS 550 is an Indian naval air squadron based at INS Venduruthy, Kochi.

== History ==
The oldest squadron of the Indian Navy, this was the unit where Naval Aviation was born, where it all began, and from where it grew and spread its wings to touch the skies. The Navy's first Fleet Requirement Unit (FRU), comprising two Sealands and manned by five pilots and two observers, was commissioned on 11 May 1953 at Venduruthy II, Kochi. Lt Cdr Y N Singh was the commissioning Squadron Commander. The FRU was recommissioned as INAS 550 on 15 June 1959 under the command of Lt Cdr Y N Singh.

In February 1954, the squadron acquired two Firefly aircraft. The squadron had its first moment of glory on 21 April 1954 when six aircraft, in batches of two, escorted SS Gothic from Colombo to Aden with Her Highness, Queen Elizabeth on board. In October 1956, HT-2 aircraft were inducted and the squadron was split up into INAS 550 A (Naval Jet Flt) at Sulur and the INAS 550-B Flt at Kochi.

In 1976, the squadron was equipped with Islander aircraft and HPT-32 aircraft were inducted in January 1986. In October 1987, the squadron completed basic flying training on the HPT-32 for the first batch of 6 naval pilots. However, the practice was discontinued and the squadron ceased further basic flying training on the HPTs. In December 1987 also saw the squadron being tasked for sorties in support of the IPKF operations in Sri Lanka.

Through the late 1980s and the nineties the squadron did extensive flying towards Observer training, maritime reconnaissance and patrol missions. In the late 1990s a few of the piston-engine Britton-Norman Islander (BN 2B) aircraft were upgraded to turbo-prop engines (BN 2T), and the squadron also acquired its first Dornier aircraft. The present day 550 continues to be a squadron that puts in extensive flying effort towards maritime reconnaissance, patrol and Observer training.

On 16 March 2018, 2 Pipistrel Virus, locally termed Garud, were inducted into the squadron. The deliveries of 12 such aircraft were completed by 2019.

As of 2024, the squadron provides Dornier Operational Flying Training to fixed wing pilots. The pilots are then further posted to operational squadrons equipped with Short Range Maritime Reconnaissance (SRMR) aircraft Dornier 228 (INAS 310, 311, 313, 314, 318) or Long Range Maritime Reconnaissance (LRMR) aircraft Boeing P-8I Neptune (INAS 312, 316). The squadron shall also impart training to pilots of Medium Range Maritime Reconnaissance (MRMR) aircraft EADS CASA C-295 planned to be inducted in future.
