= 311 Squadron =

311 Squadron or 311th Squadron may refer to:

- No. 311 Squadron RAF, a Czechoslovak-crewed bomber squadron of the Royal Air Force in World War II
- No. 311 Squadron RNLAF, a disbanded Royal Netherlands Air Force unit
- 311th Aero Squadron, a United States Army Air Force unit
- 311th Airlift Squadron, a United States Air Force unit
- 311th Fighter Squadron, a United States Air Force unit
- INAS 311, an Indian naval air squadron
- VMA-311, a United States Marine Corps attack squadron

== See also ==
- 311th Wing
