= Rajiv Gandhi Academy for Aviation Technology =

Flying school in Kerala

- Other name: RAGAAT
- Former names: Kerala Flying Club; Kerala Aviation Training Centre
- Motto: "Rule the sky, lead the world"
- Type: State-owned
- Established: 14 July 1959; 67 years ago
- Founder: G. V. Raja
- Accreditation: Directorate General of Civil Aviation (DGCA)
- Chairman: Pinarayi Vijayan
- Executive vice-chairman: V. Thulasidas (former)
- Location: Chacka, Thiruvananthapuram, Kerala, 695007, India; 8.489599°N 76.916024°E
- Campus: Rural
- Website: Official website

Rajiv Gandhi Academy for Aviation Technology (RAGAAT) is a state-owned pilot training institute run by the Government of Kerala, India. It is situated at the Thiruvananthapuram International Airport. Originally founded as Kerala Flying Club, a private flying club in 1959 by G. V. Raja, it was bought by the state government in 1981. In 2006, the institute was approved by the Directorate General of Civil Aviation (DGCA) as a Flying Training Organisation (FTO). As of 2022, RAGAAT is the only pilot training institute in Kerala and one among the 34 FTOs in India. The institute has both single and twin-engine aircraft.

== History ==
It was originally founded as Kerala Flying Club, a private flying club by G. V. Raja on 14 July 1959, registered under Companies Act, 1956. It produced trained pilots and flight engineers. Some of the aircraft that was part of Kerala Flying Club's inventory was HAL HT-2, Stinson L-5 Sentinel, HAL Pushpak, de Havilland Canada DHC-1 Chipmunk, de Havilland Canada DHC-2 Beaver, Douglas C-47 Skytrain. The flying club was briefly closed in 1967. Its name was changed to Kerala Aviation Training Centre (KATC) in 1980. In 1981, the Government of Kerala bought the institute to its direct control. In 2006, after the approval of the Directorate General of Civil Aviation (DGCA) it was rechristened as Rajiv Gandhi Academy for Aviation Technology, registered under Travancore-Cochin Literary, Scientific and Charitable Societies Registration Act, 1955.

== Campus ==
The campus is situated within the Thiruvananthapuram International Airport compound. The institute also has an off-campus centre at the Kannur International Airport. RAGAAT is the only Flying Training Organisation (FTO) in Kerala approved by the DGCA. It is also the only pilot training institute in Kerala.

As of 2019, the institute has four single-engine Cessna 172 aircraft, with two having a glass cockpit, and additionally a twin-engine Piper Seneca V for advanced training. Among the total of five aircraft, a U. S.-made Cessna 172-R bought in 2014 cost ₹1.7 crore and another U. S.-made six-seat Piper Seneca V bought in the same year cost ₹6 crore. The academy has its own hangar, built at ₹4 crore, near the aircraft maintenance base at the Thiruvananthapuram International Airport, which can accommodate up to 10 trainer aircraft. The commercial pilot licence (CPL) trainees will be given additional class in twin-engine aircraft as an add-on.

In 2012, the government began construction of a new building complex for the academy inside the Thiruvananthapuram International Airport after the old one, including a hangar, was demolished for allocating space for construction of a new terminal and an Air India engineering base. Classes were then held outside the airport in a rented building and a temporary hangar in the airport. The government allotted 2.71 acres of land to the academy, to be built near the Air India Hangar.

In March 2016, the then UDF-led Government of Kerala launched an air ambulance service exclusively for speedy organ transplantation transportation using the twin-engine aircraft of the academy, an MoU was signed between RAGAAT and the Kerala Network for Organ Sharing. However, in July that year, the newly elect LDF-led government decommissioned the project, citing that it was not cost effective or viable.

In 2018, the academy began cross-country flying to Kannur International Airport, until then, they used to fly to Madurai Airport, Mangalore International Airport or Calicut International Airport for cross-country flight training. In 2019, RAAGAT began admitting students from other flying schools for flying training when students from their own batch are undergoing ground training. The academy also opened an off-campus centre at the Kannur International Airport in 2019. The first flight was flagged off by chief minister Pinarayi Vijayan.

== Courses ==
- Commercial Pilot License (IR/ME)
- Private Pilot License
- Students Pilot License
- Instrument Rating
- Multi-Engine Rating
- Foreign License Conversion

== Controversies ==
In 2016, a trainee at the institution alleged that he faced casteist slur and physical assault from a trainer. In 2022, a female trainee accused the chief flying instructor K T Rajendran of attempting to molest her mid-flight inside the cockpit during a training session.

== See also ==
- List of pilot training institutes in India
