= INAS 313 =

- Active: 22 July 2019 - present
- Country: India
- Branch: Indian Navy
- Type: Naval aircraft squadron
- Role: Maritime reconnaissance, ELINT, Coastal surveillance, Fleet support, Casualty evacuation, Search and Rescue
- Part of: Eastern Naval Command
- Garrison/HQ: NAE Chennai, Chennai Airport
- Nickname: Sea Eagle
- Mottos: Mighty wings, dauntless spirit
- Mascot: Greater spotted eagle

Commanders
- Current commander: Cdr Vivek Koman

Aircraft flown
- Reconnaissance: Dornier 228

The Indian Naval Air Squadron 313 (INAS 313) is a maritime reconnaissance squadron of the Indian Navy based at Chennai. The squadron was commissioned on 22 July 2019 and operates the Dornier 228 twin-turboprop aircraft under the Eastern Naval Command of the Navy.

== History ==
The squadron was officially commissioned on 22 July 2020 by the Navy Chief, Admiral Karambir Singh. The squadron's commissioning CO(Commanding Officer) is Cdr Vivek Koman, an experienced aviator. The unit is situated in the Naval Air Enclave (NAE) Chennai and is controlled by the Eastern Naval Command. It is Tamil Nadu's third air base and the fifth Dornier 228 fixed wing aircraft based squadron of the Indian Navy.

The squadron has been primarily tasked with maritime surveillance, search and rescue operations and to provide targeting data for weapon platforms. It is expected to increase the Navy's surveillance capabilities along the 1,400 km Eastern coast of India. Originally raised with just two Dornier 228s, the Navy plans on inducting 12 new such aircraft while upgrading 18 of the older ones to specifications that include glass cockpit, advanced surveillance radar, ELINT capability and networking features.

== See also ==
- List of Indian naval air squadrons
- INAS 318
- INAS 311
- INAS 310
