= Basic Flying Training School (India) =

Flight training school of Indian Armed Forces

- Other names: BFTS
- Type: Indian military academy
- Established: 16 December 1987; 38 years ago
- Location: Air Force Station Bamrauli, Prayagraj, Uttar Pradesh, India

Basic Flying Training School (BFTS) is an Indian flight training institute located at the Air Force Station Bamrauli in Prayagraj for training cadets of the Army Aviation Corps. Established on 16 December 1987, it was originally setup for training flight cadets of the Indian Air Force on HAL HPT-32 Deepak aircraft. On 5 July 1999, the school changed its role from training IAF cadets to training cadets of the Indian Army, the Indian Naval Air Arm, and the Indian Coast Guard. On 26 December 2005, the school re-equipped with HAL Chetak helicopters for training Indian Army officers. At BFTS, Indian Army cadets undergo ab-initio flying and ground training that lasts five months.
