= INAS 314 =

- Active: 29 November 2019 - present
- Country: India
- Branch: Indian Navy
- Type: Squadron
- Role: Maritime reconnaissance, ELINT, Coastal surveillance, Fleet support, Casualty evacuation, Search and Rescue
- Part of: Western Naval Command
- Garrison/HQ: NAE Porbandar
- Nickname: Raptors
- Equipment: Dornier 228

Commanders
- Current commander: Cdr Shashikant Goyal

Aircraft flown
- Reconnaissance: Dornier 228

The Indian Naval Air Squadron 314 (INAS 314) is a naval squadron of the Indian Navy based at Naval Air Enclave (NAE) Porbandar. The squadron was commissioned on 29 November 2019 by Vice Admiral MS Pawar.

This squadron is currently operational under the Western Naval Command.

== History ==
INAS 314 was officially commissioned by Vice Admiral MS Pawar on 29 November 2019 at Porbandar. It operates Dornier 228 manufactured by HAL. This squadron is establish to the first responder in crucial area of North Arabian Sea. This is the sixth squadron of Dornier 228. The squadron is the first to operate 4 aircraft of newly ordered Dornier aircraft.

The squadron has been primarily tasked with maritime surveillance, search and rescue operations and to provide targeting data for weapon platforms. Indian Navy plans on inducting 12 new such aircraft.

== See also ==
- INAS 313
- INAS 318
