= INAS 324 =

- Active: 4 July 2022
- Country: India
- Branch: Indian Navy
- Part of: Eastern Naval Command
- Garrison/HQ: INS Dega, Visakhapatnam
- Nickname: The Kestrals
- Mottos: Nidruvith Dhrud Veeryvath (Faithful, Tenacious, Fearless)

Aircraft flown
- Helicopter: HAL Dhruv Mk.III MR

The INAS 324 is an air squadron of the Indian Navy based at INS Dega, Visakhapatnam. It was established on 1 January 2014 and operated under the purview of the Eastern Naval Command. It is nicknamed as the "Kestrels", and the insignia features a kestral flying over the seas.

The squadron operates the Mk.III Marine Reconnaissance (MR) variant of the HAL Dhruv helicopters, fitted with surveillance radar and sensors. It primarily undertakes aerial reconnaissance and search-and-rescue roles, and also assists in humanitarian assistance and disaster relief. The helicopters are also used for marine troop transport for special operations and as air ambulances.
