= Indian Trusts Act, 1882 =

Indian law regulating Trusts

Imperial Legislative Council
- Long title: An Act to define and amend the law relating to Private Trusts and Trustees.
- Citation: Act No. 2 of 1882
- Enacted by: Imperial Legislative Council
- Commenced: March 1, 1882
- Status: In force

The Indian Trusts Act, 1882 is a law in India relating to private trusts and trustees. The Act defines what would lawfully be called as a trust and who can legally be its trustees and provides a definition for them. The Indian Trusts Amendment Bill of 2015 amended the Act and removed some restrictions on investment of the monetary assets by the trust in certain investments. But at the same time, it enabled the government to scrutinise the trusts' investments at will

The Act does not extend to religious endowments. Its savings clause provides that nothing in the Act affects the rules of Muslim law as to waqf or the mutual relations of the members of an undivided family as determined by customary or personal law, and that the Act does not apply to "public or private religious or charitable endowments" or to trusts to distribute prizes taken in war among the captors; the second chapter of the Act, further, does not apply to trusts created before the Act came into force.

== Content ==
The Act defines how the author of the trust could create a trust and assign trustees and assign his monetary assets to be controlled by the trust. This trust should have a clear definition of the following:

- Intention by the author to create the trust
- Purpose of the trust
- The beneficiary of the monetary assets controlled by the trust
- The monetary assets assigned to the trust for the purpose defined above
- Grants control of the monetary assets to the trustee which can include the author of the trust

In addition the act also explains trustees

- have to be impartial
- can not convert property and monetary assets to profitable property outside the limits of the purpose for which the trust was created
- have to understand completely the statutes of the trust
- can benefit from being the trustee by claiming expenses and salary from the trust for his work
- can sometimes act singly if required
- cannot breach the trust of the author or the purpose of the trust

In addition investments of a trust if found to be against the law of the land can be the cause of dissolution of the trust and action can be taken against the trust

== See also ==
- English trusts law
