= INAS 551 =

- Active: 5 September 1961 - present
- Country: India
- Branch: Indian Navy
- Garrison/HQ: INS Dega, Visakhapatnam
- Nickname(s): The Phantoms

Aircraft flown
- Trainer: HAL HJT-16 Kiran (retired); Hawk Mk 132

The INAS 551 is an Indian naval air squadron based at INS Dega, Visakhapatnam.

== History ==
In its early form the squadron existed as the Naval Jet Flight (NJF) at Sulur, which was set up in September 1957 and was equipped with four Vampire aircraft. The first Flight Commander was Lt Cdr BD Law. In June 1959 the Naval Jet Flight was reconstituted as INAS 550 A. The third Flt Cdr of the NJF, Lt Raj Anderson became the first Squadron Commander of INAS 550 A, redesignated and commissioned as INAS 551 on 5 September 1961. A year later Sea Hawks from INAS 300 were also inducted into the squadron. The role of the squadron was to train pilots towards tactical flying and air combat on the Vampire. Before the pilots left for INAS 300, they were converted on Sea Hawks. The squadron was, thus, a feeder squadron for fighter pilots into naval aviation. The squadron inducted Kiran Mk I in 1970 and commenced fighter training on these aircraft. An advanced version of the Kiran, the Kiran Mk II was inducted in 1986.

In 1990, the Sea Harrier Operational Flying Training Unit was set up and INAS 551 was bifurcated into two flights. INAS 551 A operated the Kirans and INAS 551 B operated the Sea Harriers, undertaking conversion onto the aircraft for pilots joining INAS 300. In May 2003, the squadron added another feather to its cap, when it set up a naval aerobatic team, the Sagar Pawan, operating Kiran Mk II jets. The Indian Navy, thus, became only the second navy in the world after the US Navy to have an active fixed wing aerobatic team. The squadron conducts Naval Orientation Courses for pilots before they progress onto the Sea Harrier and the MiG-29K aircraft. Pre Qualified Flying Instructor Course training is also conducted for Indian Navy and Indian Coast Guard pilots. The squadron continues to fulfill its role of training naval fighter pilots till date.

The BAE Systems Hawk advanced jet trainer was inducted into INAS 551 at INS Dega on 6 November 2013 by then Chief of the Naval Staff Admiral Devendra Kumar Joshi. By 2015, 11 were received and more 6 were on order.

As of 2024, INAS 551 is a pure shore-based training squadron. Fighter pilots initially join this squadron for Naval Orientation Flying before being selected for undergoing conversion training for Mikoyan MiG-29Ks at INAS 300. Later the pilots are qualified for operational service with MiG-29Ks with INAS 303.
