= INAS 323 =

- Active: 19 April 2021 - Present
- Country: India
- Branch: Indian Navy
- Garrison/HQ: INS Hansa, Goa
- Nickname: Harriers

Commanders
- Current commander: Cdr Ashwin Simha

Aircraft flown
- Multirole helicopter: Dhruv Mk.3 MR

The INAS 323 is an Indian naval air squadron based at INS Hansa, Goa. It operates the multi-role helicopter HAL Dhruv in maritime configuration. The primary role of the squadron is Search and Rescue, Special Operations and Coastal Surveillance.

== History ==
Indian Navy commissioned its newest aircraft squadron in the presence of Raksha Rajya Mantri Shripad Naik and Vice Admiral R. Hari Kumar on 19 April, 2021. The squadron is equipped with state of art ingenuously built HAL Dhruv designed and built by Hindustan Aeronautics Limited. The aircraft in use has been heavily modified for naval use and incorporates 19 major changes to suit the Navy's need.

Indian Navy ordered 16 helicopters for search and rescue operations in 2017. These features advance instrumentation overs its older brethren Mk.1 variant already in-service with the Indian Navy. The newer aircraft features full digital glass cockpit, powerful Shakti engine and hosts of other sensors and equipment. Six of the 16 ordered will feature low frequency dunking sonar from Bharat Electronics

One of the helicopter from INAS 323 was equipped with Medical Intensive Care Unit (MICU) by Hindustan Aeronautics Limited.

== Operations ==
Initially, the squadron was commissioned with 3 helicopters. The first CO is Cdr Samik Nundy. An ace Dhruv pilot, with an extensive experience in operating the chopper..

== Gallery ==
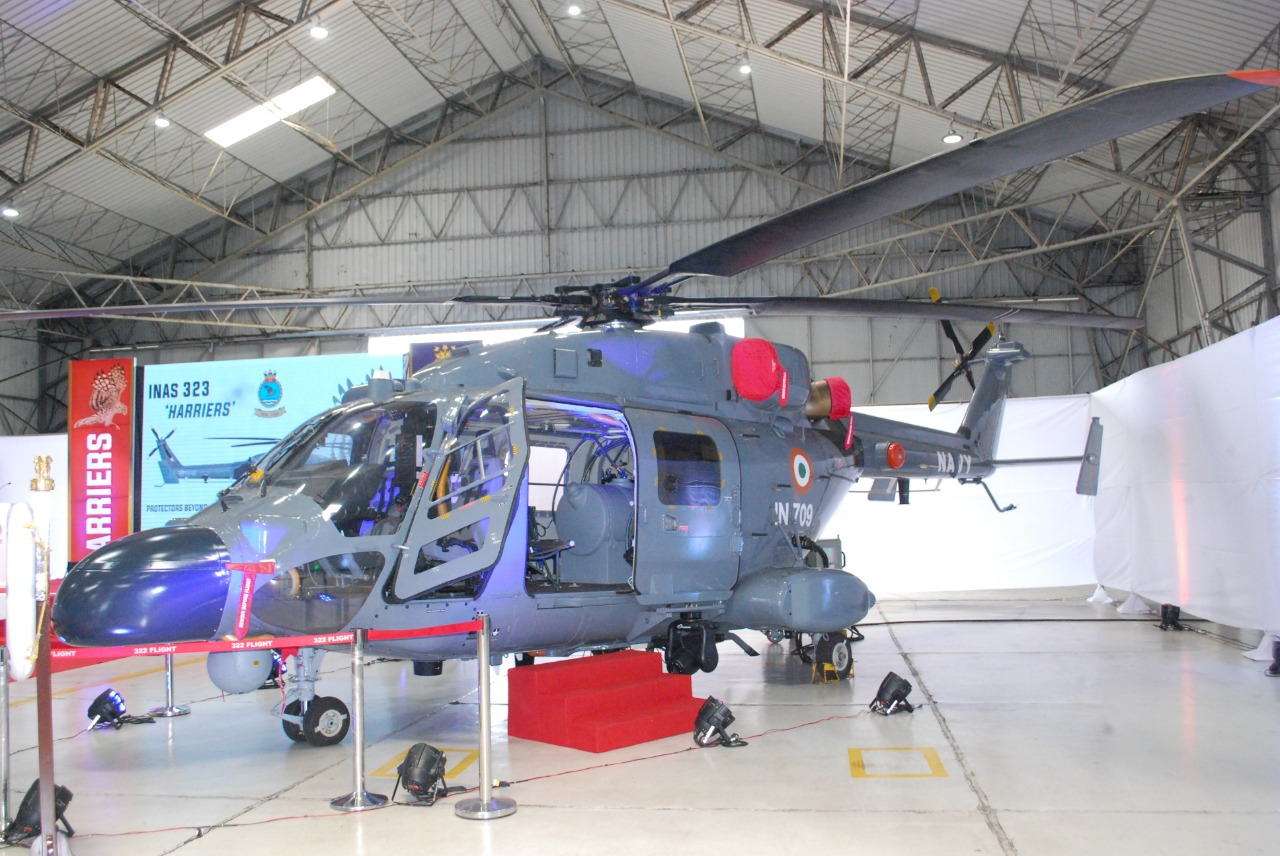
HAL Dhruv-MR during the commissioning of INAS 323 at INS Hansa, Goa.

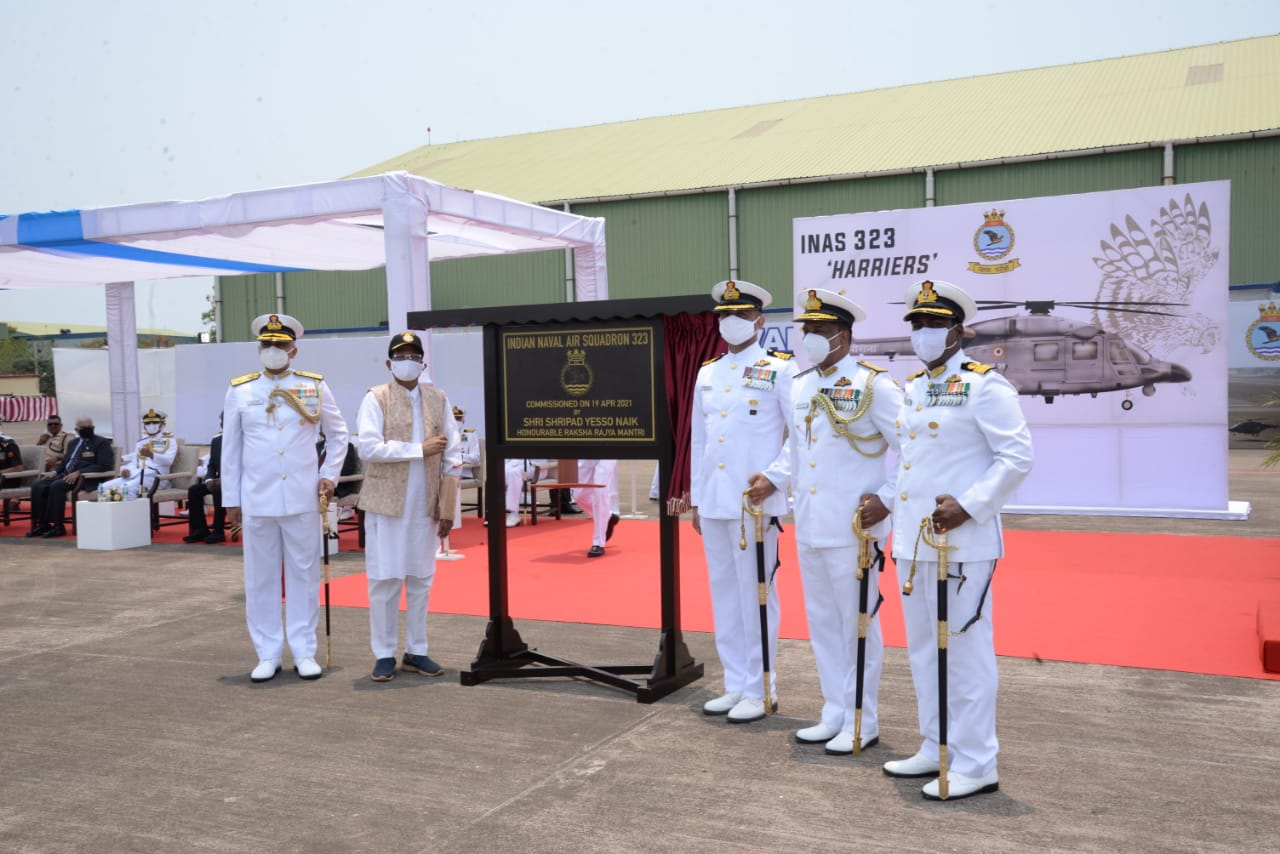
Commissioning of INAS 323 at INS Hansa, Goa.

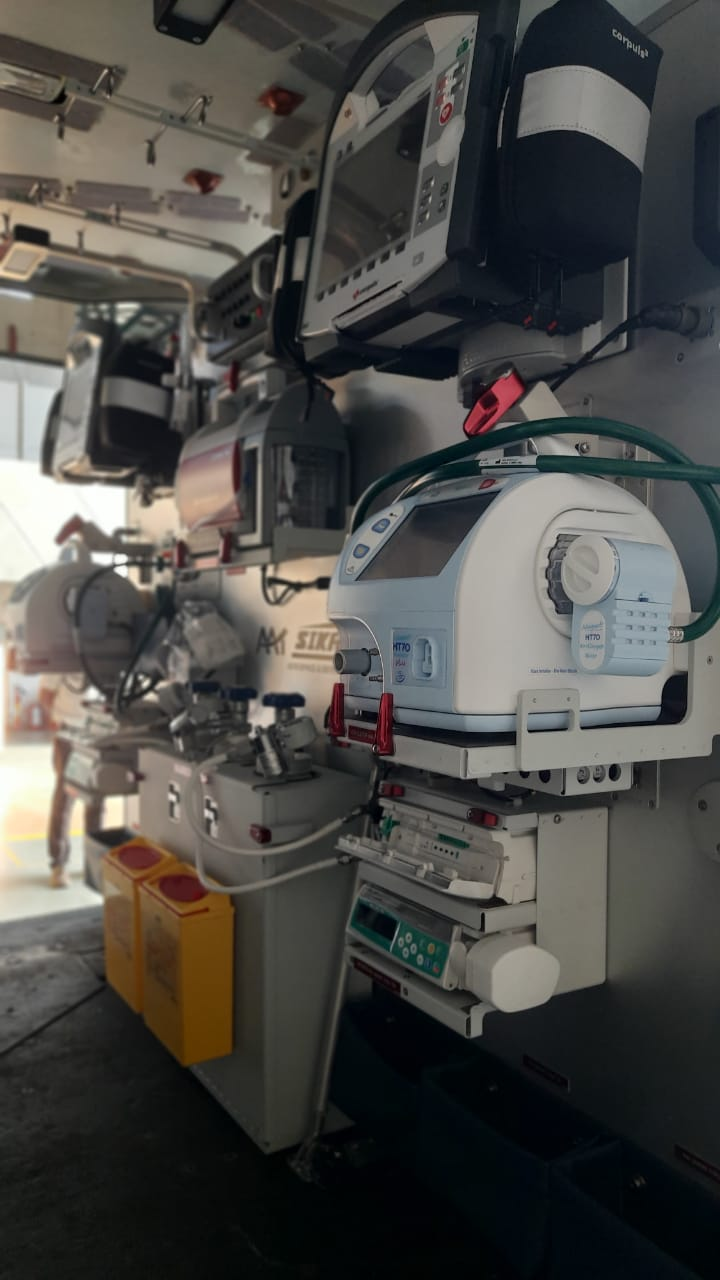
A Medical Intensive Care Unit (MICU) installed onboard ALH Mk III from INAS 323 at INS Hansa.
