= INAS 334 =

- Active: 6 March 2024—present
- Country: India
- Allegiance: India
- Branch: Indian Navy
- Type: Multirole Helicopter squadron
- Size: 6
- Garrison/HQ: INS Garuda, Kochi

Commanders
- Current commander: Captain M Abhishek Ram

Aircraft flown
- Multirole helicopter: Sikorsky MH-60R

The INAS 334 is a helicopter squadron of the Indian Navy operating Sikorsky MH-60R SeaHawk helicopters since 6 March 2024. The squadron is based at INS Garuda in Kochi and is expected to have fleet deployments onboard the Aircraft Carrier INS Vikrant.

The primary roles of the squadron includes anti-submarine warfare (ASW), anti-surface warfare (ASuW), search and rescue (SAR), medical evacuation (MEDEVAC) and vertical replenishment (VERTREP).

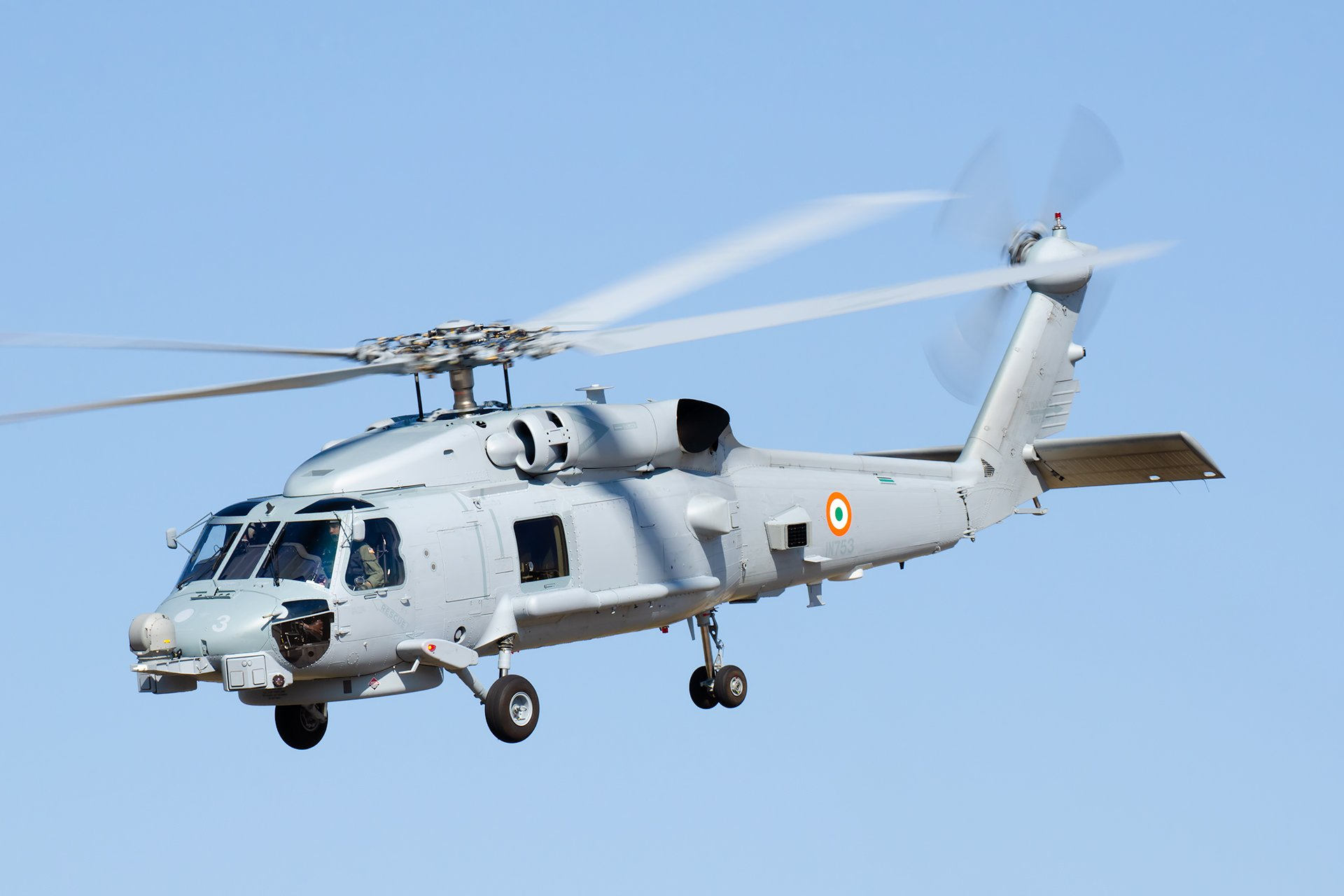
MH-60R Seahawk helicopter of Indian Navy INAS 334
