= INAS 552 =

INAS 552, Naval Flight Test Squadron
- Active: 7 July 2005 -
- Country: India
- Branch: Indian Navy
- Garrison/HQ: INS Hansa, Goa
- Nickname: The X-plorers

Aircraft flown
- Fighter: BAE Sea Harrier (trainer/ other aircraft including fixed wing and rotary wing)

INAS 552 is an Indian naval air squadron based at INS Hansa, Goa and is functioning as Naval Flight Test Squadron (NFTS) under HQNA.
