= INAS 316 =

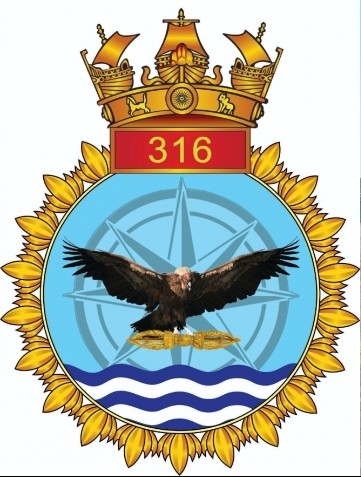
- Active: 29 March 2022 - present
- Country: India
- Branch: Indian Navy
- Type: Squadron
- Role: Maritime reconnaissance, ELINT, Coastal surveillance, Fleet support, Casualty evacuation, Search and Rescue
- Part of: Western Naval Command
- Garrison/HQ: INS Hansa
- Nickname: The Condors

Commanders
- Current commander: Commander Amit Mohapatra

Aircraft flown
- Patrol: P-8I Neptune

The INAS 316 is an Indian naval air squadron based at INS Hansa. The squadron was commissioned by Chief of Naval Staff R. Hari Kumar on 29 March 2022.

The squadron is currently operational under the Western Naval Command.

== History ==
The squadron is equipped with P-8I Neptune and was commissioned on 29 March 2022 by Chief of Naval Staff R. Hari Kumar at INS Hansa, Goa.

The squadron is primarily tasked with maritime reconnaissance, ELINT, coastal surveillance.
