= INAS 342 =

- Active: 6 January 2006 - Present
- Country: India
- Branch: Indian Navy
- Garrison/HQ: INS Garuda, Kochi

Aircraft flown
- Reconnaissance: IAI Heron

INAS 342 is an Indian Naval air squadron, operating unmanned aerial vehicles, based at INS Garuda, Kochi. The squadron was raised in 2006 and operates IAI Heron.

== History ==
IAI Heron and Searcher Mark II, were acquired from IAI Malat by the Indian Navy in December 2002. The UAVs would serve for the roles of maritime reconnaissance, search & rescue, battle damage assessment and providing OTOHT data.

Earlier in 2002, 16 internal pilots, 11 observers, 8 external pilots, 6 technical officers and 75 technical and non-technical sailors underwent training at IAI Malat. On 31 August 2002, the Intensive Flying and Trials Unit (IFTU) was established at INS Garuda and was tasked with the roles of aircraft acceptance, operator & crew training, evaluation & trials of aircraft and sensors, doctrine formulation, establishing operating & maintenance procedures.

In January 2003, Flight Training commenced and eventually the OEM personnel withdrew as the unit personnel took over. Routine and training flying finally was followed by operational exploitation and the unit started regularly participating in exercises off both coasts, from ships and from various military and non-military airfields.

The OJT cell was appointed to train the technical officers and sailors of following generations of operators and maintainers.

On 6 January 2006, IFTU was formally commissioned as an operational squadron, INAS 342. The first Officer-in-Charge was Commander Rajesh Kawatra. On this day, INAS 342 evolved into a fully functional squadron and pioneered a new era in aviation.

The INAS 342 originally operated six Israeli-built IAI Herons and six Searcher Mark IIs UAVs.

On 11 December 2024, the Indian Navy de-inducted 8 Searcher Mk-II UAVs from INAS 342 and INAS 343 after 22 years of service after a ceremony in Kochi.
