= INAS 315 =

- Active: 1 October 1977 - 31 October 2023
- Country: India
- Branch: Indian Navy
- Garrison/HQ: INS Hansa, Goa
- Nickname: The Winged Stallions

Aircraft flown
- Patrol: Ilyushin Il-38

The INAS 315 was an Indian naval air squadron based at INS Hansa, Goa.

== History ==
INAS 315 was commissioned on 1 October 1977 by Rear Admiral M. K. Roy. Cdr B K Malik was the first Squadron Commander. The squadron was initially equipped with three Ilyushin Il-38 aircraft and later two more Il-38 aircraft were inducted. With the induction of the Il-38s, the Navy acquired modern maritime reconnaissance and fixed-wing Anti Submarine Warfare (ASW) capability. In January 1978, the squadron aircraft using the on board Magnetic Anomaly Detector (MAD) equipment successfully located the wreckage of the ill-fated Air India 855 which had crashed soon after take-off of the Mumbai coast. The Squadron also participated in Operation Cactus in 1988 The Winged Stallions completed 25,000 hours of accident free flying in 1996. The squadron's Il-38 aircraft were given "Sea Dragon" mid-life upgrades in 2009.

On 1 October 2002, two Il-38s of INAS 315 collided in mid-air during a flypast near Dabolim, Goa, to celebrate the 25th anniversary of the squadron. The collision and subsequent crashes killed all six crew members in each aircraft and three bystanders on the ground. Prior to the collision, the squadron had flown 30,000 hours over 25 years without a serious accident.

The squadron was decommissioned on 31 October 2023 after 46 years of service.
