= INAS 330 =

- Active: 17 April 1971 - 14 June 2026
- Country: India
- Branch: Indian Navy
- Garrison/HQ: INS Shikra, Mumbai
- Nicknames: "The Harpoons" "The Flying Frigate"

Aircraft flown
- Multirole helicopter: Westland Sea King Mk.42B

The INAS 330 was a naval air squadron of the Indian Navy based at INS Shikra, Mumbai. The unit was equipped with the Westland Sea King Mk.42B and was decommissioned on 14 June 2026.

== History ==
Among the most potent weapon platforms in the Naval inventory is the Westland Sea King helicopter. This versatile and advanced multi role aircraft has taken modern age maritime warfare to theatres well beyond the nation's shores. INAS 330 was commissioned on 17 April 1971 under the command of Cdr M P Wadhawan. The squadron was initially equipped with Westland Sea King Mk 42 ASW helicopters acquired from British Westland Helicopters Ltd.

On 26 July 1971, the first Sea King landed on INS Vikrant. From then on the indomitable team of Harpoons and ‘Mother’ (the carrier) saw a series of firsts. The first operational ASW mission was flown on 18 October 1971. On 31 November 1971, while on an ‘Advance Screen’, a Sea King picked up a suspected submarine contact and carried out a Vectored attack for the first time. The Harpoons received their baptism with fire when hostilities broke out in 1971. Extensive ASW operations were undertaken and the Harpoons clocked over 156 hours of war effort. Over the decade the Harpoons continued to operate from INS Vikrant as the only front line carrier borne rotary wing squadron and earned the honour and reputation of being the most versatile and baleful of the whirly birds. The squadron got greater punch with the procurement of Sea King 42B which have an improved sensor fit and capability for Anti-Shipping strikes.

The squadron shifted to INS Shikra, Mumbai from INS Garuda, Kochi in October 1995 and has been based there ever since. As always the Harpoons continue to remain the eyes and ears of the fleet. Aptly named the flying frigate, the Sea Kings continue to act as force multipliers while operating from INS Viraat, Godavari class frigates and Brahmaputra class frigates. The ship borne flights continue to execute multifarious missions in all weather – by day and night.

The squadron was number plated on 14 June 2026 and its Sea King 42B fleet was retired. The squadron received 22 Nau Sena Medals throughout its 55-year service.

On June 05, 2026 Navy Headquarters gave order to number plate INAS 330 with a ceremony held on June 14, 2026 and the last squadron was retired.
