= INAS 339 =

- Active: 23 November 1990 - present
- Country: India
- Branch: Indian Navy
- Garrison/HQ: INS Shikra, Mumbai (historical); INS Hansa, Goa
- Nickname: The Falcons

Aircraft flown
- Observation helicopter: Westland Sea King (November 1990 - March 1993); Kamov Ka-28 (until May 2009); Kamov Ka-31 (2003 - present)

The INAS 339 is an Indian naval air squadron based at INS Hansa, Goa.

== History ==
INAS 339 was commissioned by V Adm S K Jain on 23 November 1990 at INS Kunjali, Mumbai. Cdr S V Purohit was the commissioning Squadron Commander of the squadron. The squadron initially operated Westland Sea King helicopters but changed over to Kamov 28s in March 1993. The squadron, thereafter, shifted base to INS Hansa, Goa.

The Falcons inducted the Kamov 31 Airborne Early Warning (AEW) aircraft in 2003 along with the induction of the Talwar Class frigates from Russia, which has understandably given them the status of Navy's ‘Eyes in the Skies’. INAS 339 operated both the KV 28 and KM 31 helicopters until May 2009. Thereafter, the KV 28 were rebased to INAS 333 in Vizag as replacement of the decommissioned KA 25s.
