= INAS 350 =

- Active: 24 March 2009 - present
- Country: India
- Branch: Indian Navy
- Garrison/HQ: INS Dega, Visakhapatnam
- Nickname: Saras
- Mottos: Strength, Valour and Perseverance

Aircraft flown
- Utility helicopter: Sea King 42C

The INAS 350 is an Indian naval air squadron based at INS Dega, Visakhapatnam.

The squadron operated six Sikorsky UH-3H from 2009 when the helicopters were bought along with INS Jalashwa (L41). The contract worth ₹1.8 billion (US$39.73 million) was signed in November 2006 under a Foreign Military Sales deal. In 2024, the helicopters were de-inducted from service during a ceremony. The type was replaced by Sea King 42C. The remaining three units conducted a flypast.
