= INAS 336 =

Indian naval air squadron

- Active: 20 December 1984 - present
- Country: India
- Branch: Indian Navy
- Garrison/HQ: INS Garuda, Kochi
- Nickname: The Flaming Arrows

Aircraft flown
- Attack helicopter: Westland Sea King

The INAS 336 is an Indian naval air squadron based at INS Garuda, Kochi.

== History ==
Ever since its inception, the submarine has been one of the most important factors in deciding the fate of sea battles. With this in mind, the Indian Naval Headquarters ordered the formation of a new Anti-Submarine Warfare (ASW) squadron.

INAS 336 was commissioned on 20 December 1974 at INS Garuda. The first Squadron Commander, Cdr D K Yadav, read the Commissioning Warrant. The squadron was initially a standby squadron for INS Vikrant and was also assigned the task of training Westland Sea King crew on type. Conversion training of pilots and observers on the Sea King subsequently became the primary task of the squadron, which the squadron has been doing with competence and alacrity. More than a quarter of century since commissioning the ‘Flaming Arrows’ has seen many a budding Naval aviator and veteran ‘Rotor Head’ pass through its hallowed portals to become front line ASW/ ASV and Marine Commando helicopter aircrew.
