= INS Garuda =

Indian Naval Air station

- IATA: none; ICAO: VOCC

Summary
- Airport type: Naval Air Station
- Operator: Indian Navy
- Location: Willingdon Island, Kochi, India
- Elevation AMSL: 2 m (6.6 ft)
- Coordinates: 9.941°N 76.275°E
- Website: http://indiannavy.nic.in/INS_Garuda.html

Map
- Location within Kerala Location within India

Runways
Direction	Length		Surface
Direction	m	ft	Surface
13/31	1,414	4,680	Asphalt
17/35	1,817	5,960	Asphalt
- Source: DAFIF

INS Garuda (ICAO: VOCC), is an Indian naval air station located in Kochi, in the state of Kerala. Commissioned on 11 May 1953, it is the oldest operating air station of the Indian Navy.

The air station is adjacent to INS Venduruthy, the headquarters of Southern Naval Command. INS Garuda is a major naval air training centre as well as an operational base.

== History ==
The original airstrip near Kochi was built by the Cochin Port Trust to transport senior officials of the British Harbour Corps from the Madras Presidency to supervise the development of modern Cochin Port in 1936. During World War II, the rudimentary airstrip was taken over by the Royal Air Force (RAF) in 1941 and expanded to establish a RAF experimental station. The Indian Air Force Volunteer Reserve (IAFVR) No. 5 Coastal Defence Flight, flying Westland Wapiti II aircraft was based at the station in May 1941. In December 1942, IAFVR No. 5 was disbanded, and resources transferred to HMS Garuda in Peelamedu (present day Coimbatore International Airport), Coimbatore, Tamil Nadu. In 1943, the Kochi facilities were transferred to the Royal Navy (RN) which established an aircraft repair yard at the location to assemble aircraft shipped to India for the war effort. HMS Garuda was decommissioned in September 1946 at the end of the war, and the Kochi infrastructure was transferred to the DGCA.

=== Post-independence ===
The Indian Navy acquired the first Short Sealand aircraft on 13 January 1953. The aviation facilities at Kochi were transferred to the Indian Navy and temporarily placed under the command of naval base, INS Venduruthy, on 1 January 1953 to prepare for operating the aircraft. The first Sealand aircraft arrived in Kochi from the UK on 4 February 1953.The facilities were commissioned as a fully operational naval air station under the command of the Indian Naval Air Arm on 11 May 1953 and renamed INS Garuda. Commodore G Douglas, was its first Commanding Officer. Since then, INS Garuda has remained a strategic operating station for the navy, with several training schools, intelligence centres, maintenance and repair facilities and experimental stations based here. A separate civil enclave for domestic travellers was allowed to operate at INS Garuda, which remained operational until July 1999, when the Cochin International Airport was commissioned. The 747 Squadron of the Indian Coast Guard was activated on 22 Apr 2002 within the premises of Naval Base Kochi. The Squadron operates two Dornier 228 aircraft.

== Commanding officers ==
S.No	Name	Assumed office	Left office	Notes
1	Commander George Douglas DFC	11 May 1953	1 October 1955	Later Chief of Naval Aviation (CONA).
2	Commander Y. N. Singh	1 October 1955	20 December 1957	
3	Commander N. S. Tyabji	20 December 1957	4 April 1960	
4	Commander K. K. Sanjana	4 April 1960	7 October 1961	
5	Commander Elenjikal Chandy Kuruvila	7 October 1961	28 February 1963	Flag Officer Commanding Western Fleet during the Indo-Pakistani War of 1971.
6	Commander P. N. Mathur	19 Mar 1963	10 September 64	
7	Commander P. I. Telles	10 September 1964	15 June 1966	
8	Commander Mihir K. Roy	8 August 1966	7 January 1969	Later Flag Officer Commanding-in-Chief Eastern Naval Command.
9	Captain K. Gopinath	4 February 1969	11 July 1971	
-	Commodore K. Gopinath	12 July 1971	31 May 1972	
10	Captain C. L. Sach Acharya	8 January 1973	30 June 1976	
11	Commodore B. R. Acharya	1 July 1976	23 April 1977	
12	Captain U. C. Tripathi	24 May 1977	9 Mar 1979	
13	Captain V. R. Ravindranath NM VSM	30 April 1979	30 June 1981	
13	Commodore V. R. Ravindranath NM VSM	1 July 1981	28 February 1982	
14	Commodore H. Johnson VSM	20 March 1982	21 December 1982	Later Vice Chief of the Naval Staff and Flag Officer Commanding-in-Chief Western Naval Command
15	Commodore M. P. Wadhawan NM VSM	22 December 1982	10 August 1984	
16	Captain Mediome Bhada	10 August 1984	31 July 1985	
17	Captain A. S. Rawat NM	31 July 1985	31 December 1985	
17	Commodore A. S. Rawat VSM	1 January 1986	8 June 1987	
18	Commodore S. Ramsagar VrC NM	8 June 1987	11 January 1988	
19	Captain Sureesh Mehta	27 April 1988	14 November 1989	Later Chief of the Naval Staff.
20	Captain V. K. Soni NM	15 Nov 1989	31 December 1990	
20	Commodore V. K. Soni NM	1 January 1991	19 July 1991	
21	Captain C. Dewan YSM	20 July 1991	17 January 1993	
22	Captain K. M. Thomas NM	18 January 1993	30 December 1993	
23	Commodore K. M. Thomas NM	1 January 1994	27 May 1996	
24	Commodore R. S. Vasan	27 May 1996	30 July 1998	
25	Commodore P. Sengupta	30 Jul 1998	30 May 2001	
26	Commander Sudhir Pillai NM	17 September 2001	17 October 2002	
27	Captain Naresh Mohan Kalia	18 October 2002	27 October 2004	
28	Captain Balvinder Singh Parhar	28 October 2004	20 April 2006	
29	Captain Amit Bhandari	21 April 2006	6 May 2008	
30	Captain Vijesh Kumar Garg	6 May 2008	9 March 2010	
30	Commodore Vijesh Kumar Garg	10 April 2010	18 April 2011	
31	Captain Himanshu S. Sapre	19 April 2011	12 September 2013	
32	Captain M. M. S. Shergill	1 August 2015	18 May 2016	
33	Commodore R. R. Ayyar	19 May 2016	22 January 2019	
34	Commodore V. B. Bellary	23 January 2019	14 December 2022	
35	Captain K. Sri Vasta	15 December 2022	31 December 2022	
35	Commodore K. Sri Vasta	1 January 2023	14 May 2024	
36	Captain Rajan Kapoor	15 May 2024	30 June 2024	
36	Commodore Rajan Kapoor	1 July 2024	Present	

== Units ==
INS Garuda has 2 intersecting runways, allowing almost all operational aircraft to land and take off.

Indian Naval Air Squadrons based at INS Garuda as of 2011 include:

- INAS 550, a reconnaissance and training squadron operating Dornier 228 aircraft
- INAS 336, an anti-submarine warfare and advanced training squadron, operating Westland Sea King Mk 42B helicopters
- INAS 321, a search and rescue and logistics squadron, operating HAL Chetak helicopters
- INAS 322, a search and rescue and logistics squadron, operating HAL Dhruv helicopters
- INAS 334, an anti-submarine warfare squadron operating Sikorsky MH-60R SeaHawk helicopters
- INAS 342, operating IAI Heron and IAI Searcher Mk. II UAVs

INS Garuda also has a number of naval aviation training schools:

- Observer School trains pilots and technical personnel in maritime reconnaissance, patrol, evacuation and search and rescue (SAR) missions
- School for Naval Airmen (SFNA) and the Naval Institute of Aviation Technology (NIAT) impart theoretical training to naval aviation personnel and those associated with flying operations
- Aeronautical Training Institute (ATI) conducts training for officers and sailors in aircraft maintenance
- School for Naval Oceanography and Meteorology (SNOM)

INS Garuda also has facilities for imparting training in airborne anti-submarine operations affiliated with the Anti-Submarine Warfare (ASW) School on INS Venduruthy. The school's facilities include a Thales Underwater Systems LOFAR (Low Frequency Analysis & Recording) training simulator.

== See also ==
Indian Navy

- List of Indian Navy bases
- List of active Indian Navy ships

Integrated commands and units

- Armed Forces Special Operations Division
- Defence Cyber Agency
- Integrated Defence Staff
- Integrated Space Cell
- Indian Nuclear Command Authority
- Indian Armed Forces
- Special Forces of India

Other lists

- Strategic Forces Command
- List of Indian Air Force stations
- List of Indian Navy bases
- India's overseas military bases
