= INAS 322 =

- Active: 12 November 2013 - present
- Country: India
- Branch: Indian Navy
- Garrison/HQ: INS Garuda, Kochi
- Nickname: The Guardians

Aircraft flown
- Multirole helicopter: HAL Dhruv

The INAS 322 is an Indian naval air squadron based at INS Garuda, Kochi.

== History ==
The Advanced Light Helicopter (ALH), also known as 'Dhruv', is the first indigenously designed and manufactured helicopter by HAL Bangalore. ALH was inducted into the Indian Navy on 28 March 2002. The Intensive Flying and Trials Unit (IFTU), formed at INS Garuda on 10 February 2003, undertook three years of intensive flying trials and evaluations. Post completion, the aircraft was cleared for operational exploitation and ALH Flights were established at Kochi and Goa on 1 September 2005. With the amalgamation of the two units in December 2009, ALH Flight Kochi remains the sole ALH operating unit in the Navy. The first ALH squadron was commissioned on 12 November 2013 at INS Garuda, Kochi. The ALH is being employed for a variety of missions including Advanced Search and Rescue, Special Heli-Borne Operations, Armed Patrol, Sniper Ops, VVIP Carriage and Night SAR. Cdr Ravi Sivasankar is the first Commanding Officer of the squadron.

== Operations ==
On 27 April 2016, the Indian Navy stationed an ALH MK III at Maldives, to be based at Kadhdhoo Island in Laamu Atol. The helicopter will assist the Maldives National Defence Force in undertaking search and rescue, casualty evacuation, coastal surveillance, maritime reconnaissance, communication and logistic duties. The Indian Naval Contingent is headed by Cdr Rohit Gupte and comprises 4 officers and 21 sailors. The technical support team comprises 13 technicians and is headed by Lt Cdr Jithu K Joy. The support team with the spares and support equipment reached Male on 25 April 2016.
