= INAS 561 =

- Active: 15 September 1971 - present
- Country: India
- Branch: Indian Navy
- Garrison/HQ: INS Rajali, Arakkonam
- Nickname(s): The Rotors

Aircraft flown
- Trainer helicopter: Sikorsky S-300 (historical); HAL Chetak (trainer)

The INAS 561 is the Naval Helicopter Training School of the Indian Navy is currently based at INS Rajali, Arakkonam.
