= INAS 321 =

- Active: 15 March 1969 - present
- Country: India
- Branch: Indian Navy
- Garrison/HQ: INS Shikra, Mumbai
- Nickname: The Angels

Aircraft flown
- Multirole helicopter: HAL Chetak

The INAS 321 is an Indian naval air squadron based at INS Shikra, Mumbai.

It was the first aviation unit to be based in the Eastern Naval Command at INS Circars, Visakhapatnam.
