= INAS 312 =

- Active: 18 November 1976 - present
- Country: India
- Branch: Indian Navy
- Garrison/HQ: INS Rajali
- Nickname(s): The Albatross

Aircraft flown
- Patrol: P-8I Neptune

The INAS 312 is an Indian naval air squadron based at INS Rajali.

== History ==
The Navy’s first long range Maritime Reconnaissance squadron was commissioned with five ex IAF Super Constellation aircraft on 18 November 1976. Cdr R D Dhir was the commissioning Squadron Commander. The squadron was originally based at INS Hansa, Goa. The Super Constellation aircraft were phased out in 1983. On 16 April 1988, Tupolev 142M aircraft were commissioned into the squadron by the then Defence Minister KC Pant, at INS Hansa. The Albatross, due to their phenomenal Maritime Reconnaissance (MR) capabilities have been spearheading the Navy’s MR effort ever since and are among the finest aircraft of their kind in the world in addition to being the fastest turbo-props. With continuous equipment upgrades and integration of new technologies, the Albatross have remained the lead aircraft for long range reconnaissance, ASW and ESM/ EW missions in the Indian Navy. The squadron was shifted to INS Rajali, Arakkonam by April 1992, and has been based there ever since. The first TU142M landed at Rajali on 7 March 1992.

On 13 November 2016, India’s Defense Minister Manohar Parrikar officially inducted the Indian Navy’s first squadron of Boeing P-8I Poseidon aircraft, designated 312-A, at INS Rajali. The new unit will be permanently based at INS Rajali. The first Commander of this air squadron was Captain Harjeet Singh Jhajj. The unit is presently under the command of Commander Venkateshwaran Ranganathan.

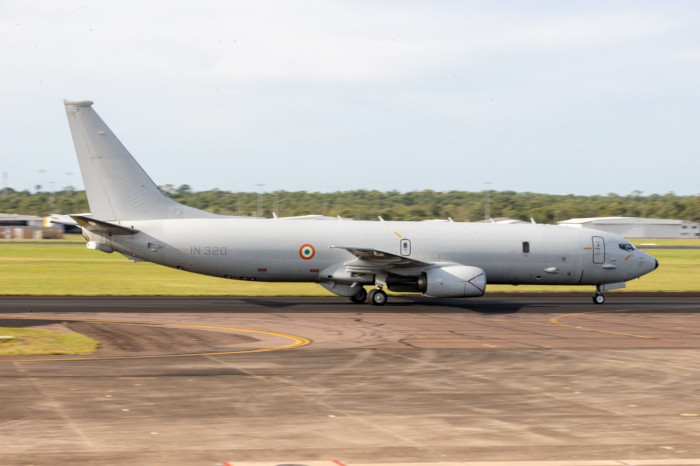
An INAS 316 "Albatross" squadron Boeing P-8I Neptune aircraft arriving in Darwin, Australia.

ON 29 March 2017, the Tupolev Tu-142M aircraft were decommissioned from the Indian Navy by Admiral Sunil Lanba at a special ceremony at INS Rajali. Commander Yogender Mair who was the last Commanding Officer of the squadron with this aircraft formally handed over the command of the squadron to Commander Venkateshwaran Ranganathan.

== Operations ==
The Tupolev Tu-142M was used in Operation Cactus in Maldives, Operation Vijay in 1998, Operation Parakram in 2002, and in anti-piracy Operations from 2011 until its decommissioning.

In January 2016, two P-8I aircraft were deployed for 2 weeks at a military base in the Andaman and Nicobar Islands. The deployment comes as a response to repeated forays of Chinese conventional and nuclear submarines into the Indian Ocean.

On 20–23 March 2016, a P-8I aircraft was deployed to Seychelles to undertake surveillance of the Seychelles EEZ. This was the first time that the P8I aircraft has been deployed to Seychelles

On 15 April 2016, a P-8I aircraft managed to thwart a piracy attack on the high seas by flying over a merchant vessel which was being targeted by a pirate mother-ship and two skiffs around 800 nautical miles from Mumbai. The P-8I was on a routine surveillance mission over the Arabian Sea when it received distress calls from the merchant vessel, the Malta-flagged MV Sezai Selah, on the international Channel 16 distress radio. The pirate mother ship and the two high-speed skiffs had come quite close to the merchant vessel. The P-8I immediately responded and made warning transmissions over Channel 16 while flying over the pirate boats. The pirate boats were frightened and altered course to leave MV Sezai Selah alone.

== Distinctions ==
INAS 312 was awarded a Unit Citation by the Chief of Naval Staff in 2002 for outstanding professionalism and momentous contribution to the Service. The squadron has won Best Frontline Squadron on numerous occasions.

During its operation of the Tu-142M, INAS 312 had distinction of operating the heaviest, fastest and highest flying turbo prop aircraft in the world.
