= INAS 310 =

- Active: 21 March 1961 - present
- Country: India
- Branch: Indian Navy
- Garrison/HQ: INS Hansa
- Nickname: The Cobras

Aircraft flown
- Electronic warfare: Bréguet 1050 Alizé 1961-1991; Dornier 228 1991-present

The INAS 310 is an Indian naval air squadron based at INS Hansa. Earlier it was shifted from INS Hansa to INS Sardar patel but later it was re-shifted to INS Hansa.

== History ==
INAS 310 was formed on 21 March 1961 with Breguet Alizé carrier-based anti-submarine warfare aircraft. Lieutenant Commander Mihir K. Roy was the commissioning commanding officer. Starting from 1991, the squadron was re-equipped with Dornier 228 aircraft configured for surveillance and electronic-warfare roles. The squadron was re-based to INS Sardar Patel from INS Hansa on 29 September 2017.

INAS 310 has participated in Operation Vijay (1961), Indo-Pakistani War of 1965, Indo-Pakistani War of 1971, Operation Pawan, Kargil War and Operation Parakram.
