= INAS 333 =

- Active: 11 December 1980 - present
- Country: India
- Branch: Indian Navy
- Garrison/HQ: INS Hansa, Goa (1980 - 2000); INS Dega, Visakhapatnam (2000 - present)
- Nickname: The Eagles

Aircraft flown
- Attack helicopter: Kamov Ka-25 (historical); Kamov Ka-28

The INAS 333 is an Indian naval air squadron based at INS Dega, Visakhapatnam.

== History ==
INAS 333 was commissioned at Goa on 11 December 1980 by V Adm O P Dawson. The squadron crest depicts an Eagle gripping a torpedo in its talons against a background of two crossed rotors. INAS 333 was commissioned with the Kamov Ka-25 helicopter and is a dedicated ASW helicopter squadron. The Kamov Ka-28 helicopters were inducted into the Squadron in 1989. Kamov helicopters are designed to operate from the decks of Kashin class destroyers and the carrier. INAS 333 was shifted to INS Dega, Visakhapatnam in the year 2000 along with the Kamov Ka-25s and has been operating from there ever since. The Ka-25s which were with the squadron since its inception were decommissioned from service in April 2009. The Ka-28 helicopters were rebased at INAS 333 from INAS 339 on 19 May 2009 and form the complement of the squadron.

With a sensor package of sonar, radar, sonobuoys and a weapon load consisting of ASW torpedoes and depth charges, the Kamov ka-28 is a major threat to enemy submarines. This highly capable aircraft is flown by a single pilot and operates from the decks of the latter two Kashin Class Destroyers. The squadron is also responsible for training the aircrew for operating the Ka-28 helicopters.
