= INAS 311 =

- Active: 24 March 2009 - present
- Country: India
- Branch: Indian Navy
- Garrison/HQ: INS Dega, Visakhapatnam
- Nickname(s): The Kites

Aircraft flown
- Electronic warfare: Dornier 228

The INAS 311 is an Indian naval air squadron based at INS Dega, Visakhapatnam.

== History ==
INAS 311 was commissioned on 24 March 2009 by the, then, Flag Officer Commanding-in-Chief, Eastern Naval Command, Vice Admiral Nirmal Verma, ADC. Cdr Sanjay Nandal was the commissioning commanding officer of the squadron. The squadron is based at INS Dega, Visakhapatnam, and operates the Dornier 228 aircraft.
