= INAS 318 =

- Active: 10 March 1984 - present
- Country: India
- Branch: Indian Navy
- Garrison/HQ: INS Utkrosh, Port Blair
- Nickname: The Hawks

Aircraft flown
- Patrol: Dornier Do-228

The INAS 318 is an Indian naval air squadron based at INS Utkrosh, Port Blair.

== History ==
INAS 318 was commissioned on 10 March 1984. Lt Cdr J S Dhillon was the first Squadron Commander. The squadron was initially equipped with Islander aircraft which have been replaced by Dorniers subsequently. The squadron is based at INS Utkrosh, Port Blair. The squadron's primary task is maritime reconnaissance and patrol. The squadron has been doing a laudable job of maintaining vigil around the far-flung outposts of the Andamans and has participated in many anti poaching and anti smuggling operations. The squadron contributes in great measure to the Navy's policy of ‘Look East’ and with the formation of the new integrated command at Port Blair these aircraft are important assets in order to keep the pirate infested Malacca Straits under constant surveillance.
