= INS Kadamba =

Indian Navy base near Karwar, Karnataka

Coordinates: 14°45′51.20″N 74°7′42.36″E

- karwar
- Karwar, Karnataka
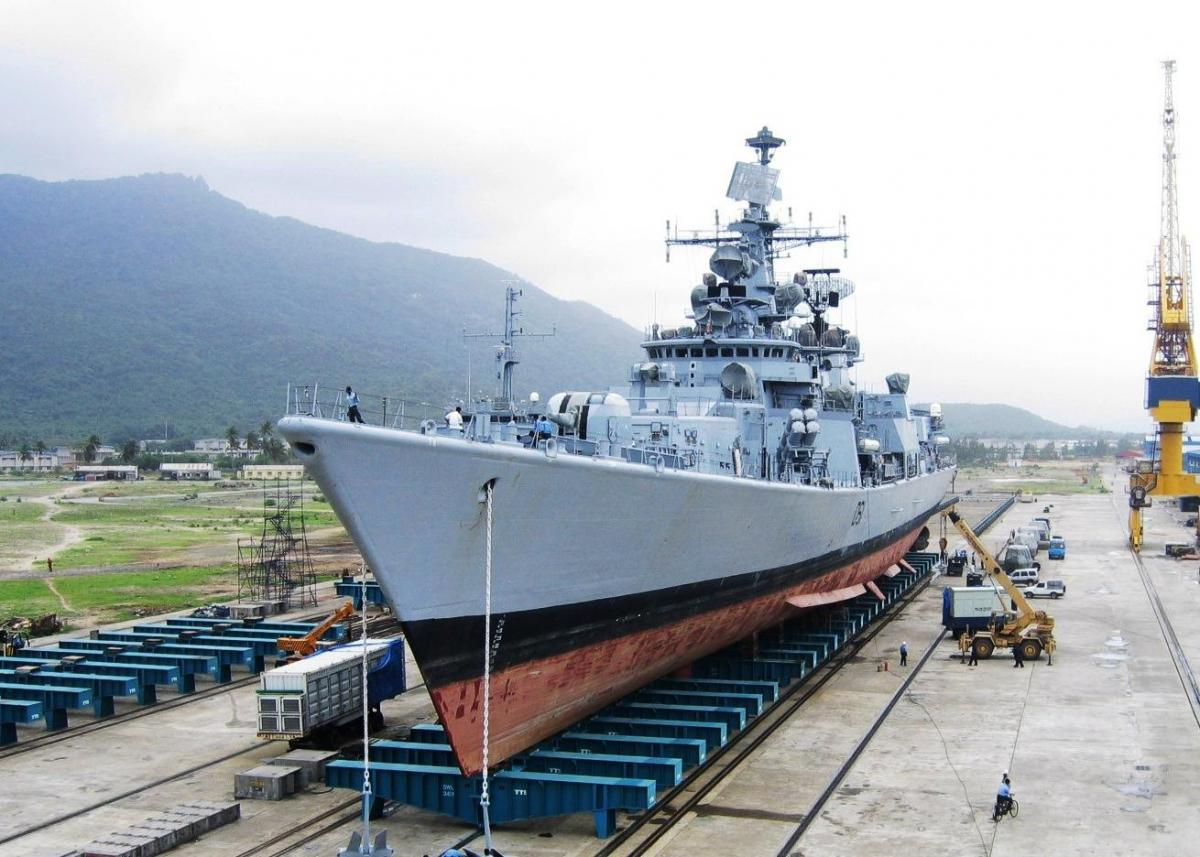
- INS Delhi docked using the ship-lift system at Naval Ship Repair Yard at INS Kadamba.

Site information
- Type: Naval station
- Controlled by: Indian Navy

Site history
- Built: 2005
- In use: 2005–present

Garrison information
- Current commander: Captain V S Guru
- Occupants: Western Naval Command

INS Kadamba or Naval Base Karwar is an Indian Navy base located near Karwar in Karnataka. The base, which was commissioned on 31 May 2005, is being developed under the codename, Project Seabird. The Phase I of the project was completed in 2011 while the Phase IIA commenced after 2017 and is underway as of 2025.

On completion of Phase IIA, the base will have a capacity of basing 32 warships besides other auxiliary crafts. The base also has the country's first shiplift and transfer system for docking and undocking ships and submarines. Upon completion of its development following Phase II-B, the naval base will be the largest of its kind in the Eastern Hemisphere with a capacity of 50 warships.

As of 2024, both of the Navy's aircraft carriers INS Vikramaditya and INS Vikrant are based here.

== History ==
During the Indo-Pakistan War of 1971, the Indian Navy faced security challenges for its Western Fleet in Mumbai Harbour due to congestion in the shipping lanes from commercial shipping traffic, fishing boats and tourists. At the end of the war, various options were considered on addressing these concerns.

Existing naval bases in India (like Mumbai, Visakhapatnam, Kochi and smaller naval enclaves like Dabolim and Kolkata) naval operations was hindered due to commercial shipping traffic, narrow approach channel, lack of expansion space. Visakhapatnam, the then largest naval base with a capacity of berthing 50 naval ships, did not have 8-9 metre depth required for entry of aircraft carriers like INS Viraat and was also not straight making manoeuvring of longer vessels difficult. Mumbai, on the other hand, had its last expansion in 1980s which included construction of a quay. But further expansions were not possible due to security threats for nearby tall buildings like Taj Mahal Palace Hotel, the Bombay Stock Exchange and Ballard Pier. Its shallow waters also made berthing of soon-to-be acquired INS Vikramaditya difficult. Kochi had no expansion prospect since it was a backwater harbour.

Due to these limitations, a dedicated new base had to be built on the west coast in order to decongest Mumbai. New locations like Thiruvananthapuram, Kannur and Thoothukudi were considered, but Karwar was finally chosen due to its strategic importance. The base was conceived of by the then Chief of the Naval Staff Admiral Oscar Stanley Dawson in the early 1980s since it was sandwiched between the craggy hills of the Western Ghats and the Arabian Sea near Karwar in Karnataka state. Located south of the naval bases in Mumbai and Goa and north of Kochi, the location had significant advantages as being very close to the world's busiest shipping route between the Persian Gulf and east Asia and out of range of most strike aircraft from neighboring countries. It also offered a natural deep-water harbour and significant land area for expansion, allowing larger aircraft carriers to berth. The site was selected after technical and hydrographic surveys by institutes like the National Institute of Hydrology, the Central Water and Power Research Station and the National Institute of Oceanography. The harbour had advantages due to its hilly terrain, acting as a camouflage to ground installations and also as positions for the Navy to disperse its forces in case of an attack, along with its forested terrain, providing cover from surveillance satellites supported by infrared decoys. Other requirements for berthing, navigation of ships and necessary depth were also satisfactory.

=== Project Seabird ===
The Project Seabird, an integrated strategic naval base at Karwar, was first sanctioned in 1985, followed by laying of the foundation stone by the then Prime Minister Rajiv Gandhi in October 1986.

As per initial timelines, construction of the project, estimated to cost ₹1,760 crore (equivalent to ₹260 billion or US$2.8 billion in 2026), was to begin in January 1986 and completed within seven years. However, the project was shelved due to inadequate funds allocations in the defence budget. Attempts to revive the project failed twice, first in 1990 when a detailed project report (DPR) was drawn up but it stalled due to lack of funds for its phased implementation and again in 1995 when the government said it would be unable to fund the entire Phase I [worth ₹2,500 crore (equivalent to ₹160 billion or US$1.7 billion in 2026)]. The Navy was asked to limit the Phase I expenditure to ₹1,200 crore (equivalent to ₹78 billion or US$830 million in 2026). Hence, the Phase I was again divided into two halves, the first of which was expected to be completed by 2005, while the entire Phase I by 2010.

In 1999, following Pokhran-II, then Defence Minister George Fernandes approved Project Seabird to pursue the construction of the new naval base at Karwar.

Project Seabird commenced in October 1999 with marine works primarily including creation of a tranquil harbour, the dredging of the approach channel and the anchorage area, and the reclamation of 49 hectares (120 acres) of land as well as construction of three breakwaters — a 1.7 km (1.1 mi)-long northern breakwater (connecting Binaga Point and Anjadip Island), a 3.1 km (1.9 mi)-long southern breakwater (connecting Round Island and Arge Island), and another 0.34 km (0.21 mi)-long spur (extending from Anjadip Island westwards). The approach channel, would be between the spur and Round Island. The harbour would have a depth ranging from 10 metres to a maximum of 12 metres at the core.

For the project, Radisson (Australia) and Nedeco (Netherlands) were chosen as global consultants for the marine works and Mecon (India) for the onshore works. A joint venture, comprising Hochtief (Germany), Ballast Nedam Dredging (Netherlands) and Larsen & Toubro (India) won a contract of ₹576 crore (equivalent to ₹27 billion or US$290 million in 2026) for marine works. Meanwhile, onshore works, worth ₹500 crore (equivalent to ₹23 billion or US$250 million in 2026) were tendered and divided among companies including Larsen & Toubro, Skanska, Bridge & Roof, Nagarjuna Construction Company and Syncrolift. Syncrolift was contracted for the unique Shiplift and Ship Transfer System worth ₹150 crore (equivalent to ₹703 crore or US$75 million in 2026). The system would be capable lifting all Indian Naval Ships except aircraft carriers and replenishment oilers. A cleaning berth and a dry berth were constructed as part of Phase I. The system could also act as a wet berthing station for all classes of naval ships and submarines.

As of 2003, Project Seabird was to be opened for ships in January 2005 and commissioned on 7 May 2005 as INS Kadamba. The project had been again delayed due to a labour dispute that affected offshore works. The first phase would cost ₹2,480 crore (equivalent to ₹99 billion or US$1.1 billion in 2026). As of then, the northern breakwaters and the spur were completed while the southern breakwater would be complete by March 2004. The anchorage of the port was also expected to be completed by April 2004 and a maximum depth of 10 metres was already available.

After the completion of Phase I, another phase of the project would be pursued. Under Phase II, additional facilities other than capacity expansion of the base to 50 warships included a research centre, a naval air station, a naval armament depot (later, INS Vajrakosh) and a missile technical position around 17 km (11 mi) from the base. While long-range maritime patrol aircraft would continue to be stationed at Dabolim and Arakkonam, ship-based helicopter units and Dorniers used for fleet requirements will be stationed at the base. a second approach channel with a depth of 11 metres could also be opened between Arge Island and the mainland.

== Phase I expansion ==
On 31 May 2005, INS Kadamba was commissioned as the third operational naval base (after Mumbai and Visakhapatnam) and the first dedicated naval base in India. The ceremony was attended by the then Defence Minister Pranab Mukherjee. Six frontline warships including aircraft carrier INS Viraat, destroyers INS Mumbai, INS Mysore and frigates INS Talwar, INS Gomati and INS Godavari were docked in the naval base on the day. The project's Phase I, which was not yet complete, had already taken two decades since its inception.

Commodore K P Ramachandran was the first to hold the office of Commanding Officer, INS Kadamba. The post would later be upgraded to Flag Officer Commanding (Karwar) tasked by the Flag Officer Commanding-in-Chief Western Naval Command.

As of then, the Navy planned to relocate at least 10 capital ships from Mumbai to Karwar including a few missile destroyers, frigates, and corvettes, auxiliary ships and offshore patrol vessels. The Scorpène-class submarines was also planned to be based here in future.

Phase-I was completed at a total cost of ₹2,629 crore (equivalent to ₹46 billion or US$490 million in 2026) in 2011.

The facilities that were developed under the first phase included:

- The naval base occupies an area of 11,200 acres (45 km^{2}) and is spread across a 26 km (16 mi)-long coastline along the Arabian Sea.
- A 420 m × 185 m (1,378 ft × 607 ft) jetty with a capacity of hosting up to 11 frontline warships (including an aircraft carrier) and 10 yardcrafts.
- Naval Ship Repair Yard (Karwar): A 10,000 tonne capacity 175 m × 28 m (574 ft × 92 ft) shiplift with a ship transfer system for dry docking any ship of its fleet except replenishment oilers and aircraft carriers. The yard commenced functioning in July 2006 and the ship-lift was commissioned on 8 November 2006.
- INHS Patanjali: A 141-bed naval hospital.
- Residential accommodation of 43 officers and 200 sailors.

A second phase of expansion was also planned at the time. Post expansion, the capacity of the base would be 22 and would also include naval air station, naval armament depot and research facility. The entire development of the base would cost ₹35,000 crore (equivalent to ₹1.3 trillion or US$14 billion in 2026) and provide a capacity to host over 42 warships.

== Phase II expansion ==
As of 2011, the defence ministry was preparing a 'note' for approval by the government after fine-tuning the detailed project review (DPR) after multiple delays. The delays were attributed to unavailability of eligible Indian companies who would be able to handle such infrastructure projects. There were additional objections from the Finance Ministry about the estimated cost of the project as presented by the Navy. The approval from the Defence Ministry was granted in May 2012. The base would have the capacity of 32 warships and other ships including 10 of the fast-interceptor craft (FICs) of the Sagar Prahari Bal. The proposal was then forwarded to the Cabinet Committee on Security (CCS) headed by the then Prime Minister of India Manmohan Singh. The Phase-IIA expansion was approved by the CCS on 6 December 2012. The project was worth ₹13,500 crore (equivalent to ₹280 billion or US$3.0 billion in 2026). The project was planned to be completed by 2017–18. The base would also host INS Vikramaditya and Scorpène-class submarines.

The environment clearance for Phase II was granted in June 2014 on a priority basis for strategic reasons by the environment minister.

=== Phase II-A ===
As of December 2015, the Indian Navy had acquired 11,334 acres of land from the State Government, which included 8,661 acres of forest land. The development of Phase IIA was expected to start from 2016.

By 2016, the commencement of Phase II-A was delayed by a year to 2017 and end in 2021–2022 with an estimated cost of ₹19,600 crore (equivalent to ₹310 billion or US$3.3 billion in 2026). The project is expected to generate large scale employment and infuse money into the local economy. In this phase, the base will undergo the following upgrades:

- The base will be able to host 32 ships and submarines along with 23 yardcraft. The upgrade will provide berthing space of over 6 km. Apart from berthing INS Vikramaditya, two more aircraft carriers will be homeported here. For this, two more jetties will be used. A few of the Kalvari-class submarines will also be based here.
- There will be four Covered Dry Berths, each with a height of 75 m (246 ft) and a total area of 33,000 m^{2} (360,000 sq ft), with the capability of simultaneously docking of up to four capital ships.
- Eight operational jetties, two refit jetties, four Covered Dry Berths and a full-fledged Naval Dockyard to handle additional ships
- Four residential townships to accommodate 10,000 officers, sailors and defence civilian staff. The townships are situated in the east of Manzil Creek and Amadalli and includes 2,160 and 3,168 accommodation units for senior sailors and defence civilians, respectively. A Hyderabad-based company, NCC Ltd, has been contracted for its construction.
- Naval Air Station with 2,700 m (8,900 ft) runway for helicopters, unmanned aerial vehicles and medium transport aircraft with a civilian enclave
- INHS Patanjali will be upgraded from 141-bed to 400-bed hospital. After completion of this phase, the base will have over one lakh personnel working there, apart from their families living in an upcoming residential township.

==== Inauguration timeline ====
- 5 March 2024: Defense Minister Rajnath Singh inaugurated new facilities and infrastructure at the base. These consist of "two major piers and seven residential towers comprising 320 houses for officers and civilian defence personnel as well as 149 single officers’ accommodation."
- 9 April 2024: The then Chief of the Naval Staff, R. Hari Kumar, inaugurated a pier and a residential complex. Pier 3 or Offshore Patrol Vessels Pier is a 350 m long pier capable of berthing Offshore Patrol Vessels (OPV), large survey vessels and mine countermeasure vessels. The pier would supply the ships with a variety of shore-based facilities, which includes power, potable water, chilled water for air conditioning, a 30-ton mobile crane, and other domestic services. A residential housing consisting of two towers with 80 apartments each for married officers and 149 apartments for single officers, as well as associated facilities and outside services were inaugurated as well. The facility also included six towers housing 360 apartments of Type-II for civilian employees of the Defence Department were opened.
- 5 April 2025: Two refit piers and 480 residential apartments for sailors and defence civilians along with support infrastructures including 25 km road network, 12 km stormwater drainage, water reservoirs among others were inaugurated by Defense Minister Rajnath Singh worth over ₹2,000 crore (equivalent to ₹21 billion or US$220 million in 2026). By then, work on the inner harbour was completed while that on the outer harbour, "with the requisite breakwaters and jetties", was underway.
- 14 October 2025: The Navy chief, Dinesh Kumar Tripathi, in the presence of other senior officers inaugurated four towers including 240 dwelling units (DU) each for married senior sailors and defence civilians, respectively.
- 22 February 2026: The Flag Officer Commanding-in-Chief Western Naval Command (FOC-in-C WNC), Vice Admiral Krishna Swaminathan, inaugurated multiple residential complexes in the East of Manzil Creek (EOMC) and Amadalli. The complex includes one tower, with 60 dwelling units (DU), for accommodating married senior officers and four towers, with 240 units (DU), for naval defence civilians. The project was undertaken by Hyderabad-based NCC Ltd.
- 8 October 2026: The Chief of Defence Staff, General N. S. Raja Subramani, inaugurated residential accommodation for Senior Sailors and Defence Civilians of Indian Navy along with critical trunk utility and amenity infrastructure in the East of Manzil Creek (EOMC) and Amadalli. The newly inaugurated accommodation included another tower with 60 dwelling units (DU) for married senior officers, and one with 60 DU for Defence Civilians inliving accommodation for 156 DSC personnel and a KG school. While the residential projects with amenities were completed by NCC Ltd., a trunk infrastructure project was executed by Cemindia Projects India Ltd.
- 17 October 2026: Vice Admiral Sanjay Vatsayan, the Flag Officer Commanding-in-Chief Western Naval Command (FOC-in-C WNC), inaugurated five residential towers with 300 dwelling units for Defence Civilians of Indian Navy Station Health Organisation Complex along with trunk utility and access infrastructure. The health complex enhanced the capacity of INHS Patanjali to 409 beds supported by a Two Lakh Litre Hill Top Water Reservoir and a Sewage Treatment Plant (STP). The access infrastructure included access gate and bridge with four-lane vehicular traffic with dedicated pedestrian and cycle pathways.

=== Phase II-B ===
After the completion of this phase of the project, which is under planning stage as of 2025, INS Kadamba will be able to base 50 frontline warships as well as 40 auxiliary ships, and will be the biggest naval base east of the Suez Canal.

== Support facilities ==
=== Combat Training Centre, Karwar ===
The Indian Navy plans to construct an Integrated Training Facility of 75 acres (300,000 m^{2}) at Karwar. The facility will train Navy personnel, MARCOS operators and Special Forces of friendly foreign nations to combat piracy and terrorism. The facility will include a Three-Storey Multilevel Kill House including mock-ups of hotel lobbies, rooms, conference halls, offices of different sizes as well as that of machinery and living spaces of ships. The Kill House will have ballistic protection. It will also have a Maritime Workup Station consisting of mock-ups of an oil rig, a ship along with a pool capable of wave generation to simulate various sea-states, and an Obstacle-cum-Jungle Firing Range. The oil rig mock-up will have replicate all the parts of an operational oil rog while that of a ship will replicate the side of a merchant ship, its weather deck and superstructure. An Urban Terrain Complex will include two complexes, one replicating an urban setup of a city or town and the other replicating a rural setup of a village. Lastly, the training centre includes an Indoor Firing Range with Advanced Target System and Firing Simulator. It will house an armoury for stowage of weapons, ammunition, explosives and special equipment.

=== Stage-II Recruitment Centre ===
A Stage-II Recruitment Centre was inaugurated at the Naval Base on 12 November 2025. This is the tenth such centre in the Navy.

== Important milestones ==
- Initial Sanction - 1985
- Foundation Stone laid - 24 October 1986
- Acquisition of land - 1985–1988
- Master Plan & DPR - 1990
- Truncated Phase 1 sanctioned - Oct 1995
- Execution of project - 1999–2005
- Rehabilitation Phase 1 - 1995–1999
- Construction commenced - 2000
- Priority Housing - February 2003
- Breakwater completed - February 2004
- Sailors Residential Colony - July 2004
- Anchorage completed - November 2004
- Pier completed - February 2005
- Officers Colony at Kamath Bay - February 2004
- Docking of the first navy ship INS Shardul
- Karwar Naval Hospital - Feb 2005 (Temporary location)
- Ship Lift installed - Apr 2005
- Phase 2 sanctioned- 2012
- Arrival of Indian aircraft carrier INS Vikramaditya - January 2014
- Phase 2 construction commenced - 2016
- Berthing of Indian aircraft carrier INS Vikrant - May 2023
- Phase 2A Pier 1 and 2 completed - March 2024
- Phase 2A Pier 3 (OPV) completed - April 2024
- Phase 2A two refit piers completed - April 2025

== See also ==
Indian navy

- Director General Project Seabird
- List of Indian Navy bases
- List of active Indian Navy ships
- INS Varsha — another dedicated major naval base on the Eastern Seaboard of India
- INS Vajrakosh, missile and ammunition base at Karwar
- INHS Patanjali, naval hospital at Karwar
- Karwar Airport

Integrated commands and units

- Armed Forces Special Operations Division
- Defence Cyber Agency
- Integrated Defence Staff
- Integrated Space Cell
- Indian Nuclear Command Authority
- Indian Armed Forces
- Special Forces of India

Other lists

- Strategic Forces Command
- List of Indian Air Force stations
- List of Indian Navy bases
- India's overseas military bases
- Naval Station Norfolk, world's largest naval base.
