= INS Vikramaditya =

Aircraft carrier of the Indian Navy

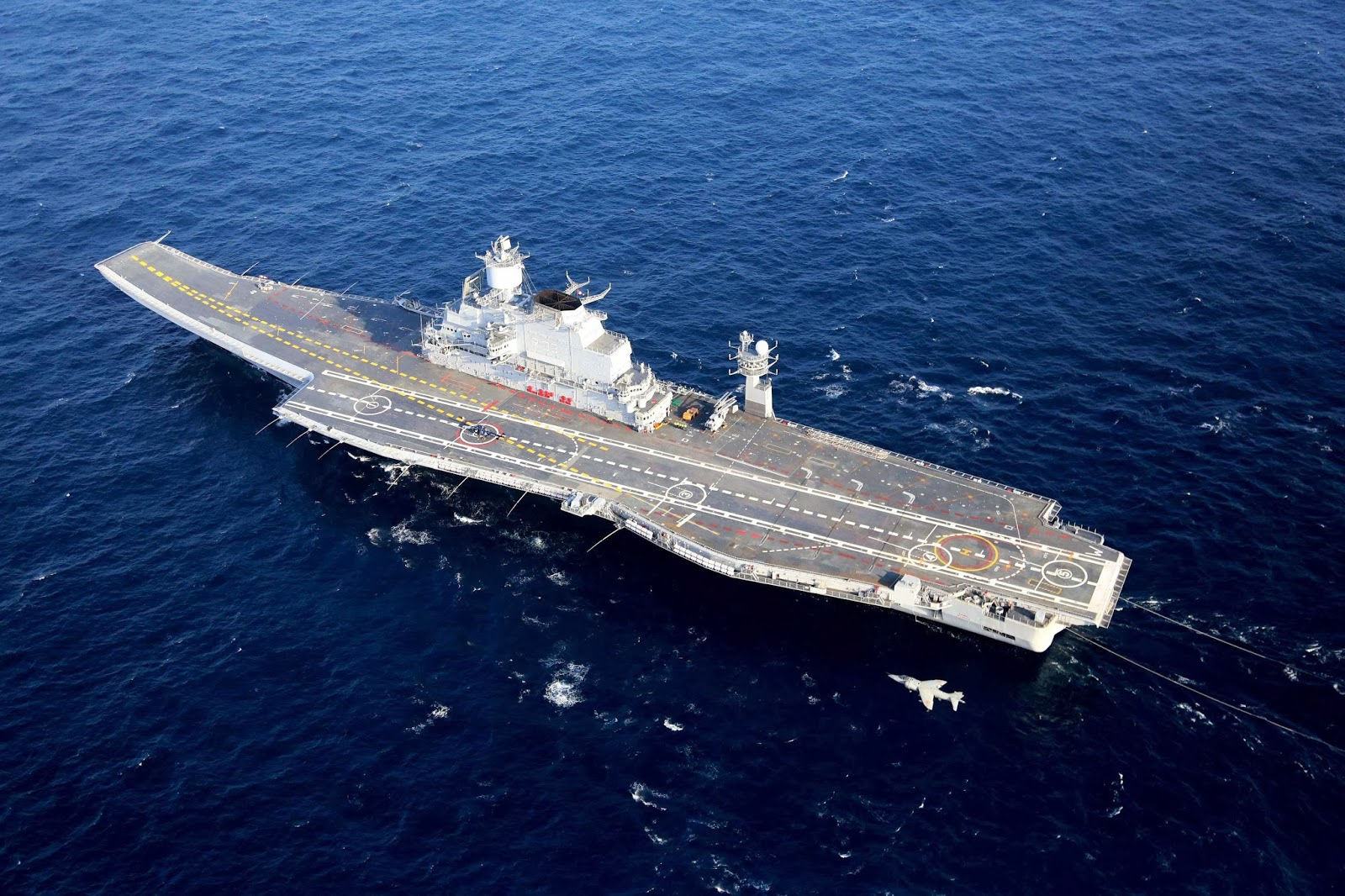
- Indian aircraft carrier INS Vikramaditya

History

→ Soviet Union → Russia
- Name: Admiral Gorshkov
- Namesake: Sergey Gorshkov
- Builder: Chernomorskiy Yard, Nikolayev
- Laid down: 17 February 1978
- Launched: 1 April 1982
- Commissioned: 11 December 1987
- Decommissioned: 1996
- Fate: Sold to the Indian Navy on 20 January 2004

India
- Name: INS Vikramaditya
- Namesake: Vikramāditya
- Operator: Indian Navy
- Ordered: 20 January 2004
- Builder: Black Sea Shipyard, USSR, and Sevmash, Russia
- Cost: $2.35 billion (refurbishment) $10-11 billion (including all aircraft and systems)
- Launched: 4 December 2008
- Completed: 19 April 2012
- Commissioned: 16 November 2013
- In service: 14 June 2014
- Identification: Pennant number: R33; MMSI number: 419000033
- Motto: Strike Far, Strike Sure
- Status: Active

General characteristics
- Class & type: Modified Kiev-class aircraft carrier
- Type: Aircraft carrier
- Displacement: 45,000 tons of loaded displacement
- Length: 284 metres (932 ft) (overall)
- Beam: 61 metres (200 ft)
- Height: 60.0 metres (196.9 ft)
- Draught: 10.2 metres (33 ft)
- Decks: 22
- Installed power: 6 turbo alternators and 6 diesel alternators which generate 18 MWe
- Propulsion: 8 turbo-pressurised boilers, 4 shafts, 4 geared steam turbines, generating 180,000 horsepower (134,226 kW)
- Speed: +30 knots (56 km/h)
- Range: 13,500 nautical miles (25,000 km) at 18 knots (33 km/h)
- Endurance: 45 days
- Complement: 110 officers and 1500 sailors
- Sensors & processing systems: Long-range Air Surveillance Radars, LESORUB-E, Resistor-E radar complex, CCS MK II communication complex and Link II tactical data system
- Armament: 4 × AK-630 CIWS; 3 × Barak 1 (2×4 VLS cells; ex-INS Godavari)
- Aircraft carried: Maximum of 34 aircraft including; 26 × Mikoyan MiG-29K carrier-based multirole fighter; 10 × Kamov Ka-31 AEW&C and Kamov Ka-28 ASW helicopters
- Aviation facilities: 14-degree ski-jump; Three 30 m wide arrester gears and three restraining gears.

INS Vikramaditya (lit. 'Valour Comparable to the Sun') (Note: Literally Vikramaditya translates as being "Sun (Aditya) of valour" (Vikram). The component āditya (sun) literally means "he who belongs to Aditi". It was the title of the most famous king in Indian history, Vikramaditya of Ujjain, famed as a noble ruler and a mighty warrior. He ruled the Gupta Empire between 380 and 413/15 AD.) is a conventionally powered STOBAR aircraft carrier currently serving as the flagship of the Indian Navy. It is a modified Kiev class aircraft cruiser purchased from Russia and entered into service in 2013.

Originally built as Baku and commissioned in 1987, the carrier served with the Soviet Navy and later with the Russian Navy (as Admiral Gorshkov) before being decommissioned in 1996. After years of negotiations, the carrier was purchased by India on 20 January 2004. The transformed ship completed her sea trials in July 2013 and first naval aviation trials in September 2013.

Vikramaditya was commissioned on 16 November 2013 at a ceremony held at Severodvinsk, Russia. On 14 June 2014, the newly elected Prime Minister of India, Narendra Modi, formally inducted Vikramaditya into the Indian Navy.

== Acquisition ==
=== Contract and negotiations ===
Baku entered service in 1987, renamed Admiral Gorshkov in 1991, but was deactivated in 1996 because she was too expensive to operate on a post-Cold War budget. This attracted the attention of India, which was looking for a way to expand its carrier aviation capabilities. On 20 January 2004, after years of negotiations, Russia and India signed a deal for the sale of the ship. The ship would be free, while India would pay US$800 million for the upgrade and refit of the vessel and an additional US$1 billion for the aircraft and weapons systems. The upgrade involved stripping all the weaponry and missile launcher tubes from the ship's foredeck to make way for a "short take-off but arrested recovery" (STOBAR) configuration, converting the Gorshkov from a hybrid carrier/cruiser to a pure carrier.

The deal also included the purchase of 12 single-seat Mikoyan MiG-29K "Fulcrum-D" (Product 9.41) and four dual-seat MiG-29KUB aircraft (with an option for 14 more aircraft) at US$1 billion, six Kamov Ka-31 "Helix" reconnaissance and antisubmarine helicopters, torpedo tubes, missile systems, and artillery units. Facilities and procedures for training pilots and technical staff, delivery of simulators, spare parts, and establishment maintenance on Indian Navy facilities were also part of the contract.

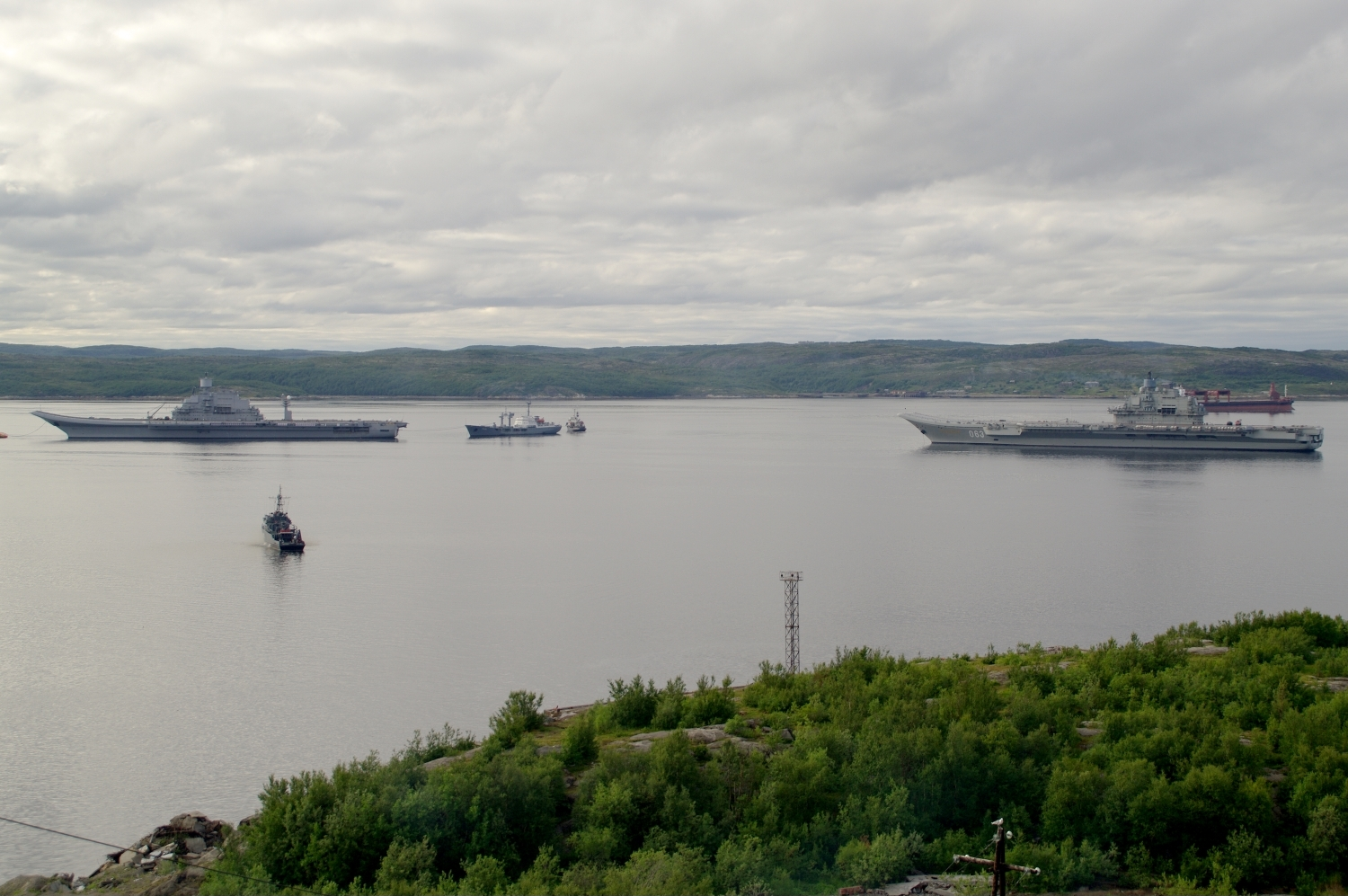
Vikramaditya (left) alongside the Russian aircraft carrier Admiral Kuznetsov in the port of Severomorsk in 2012

The announced delivery date for INS Vikramaditya was August 2008, allowing the carrier to enter service just as the Indian Navy's only light carrier INS Viraat retired, but repeated delays forced an extension of Viraat's active service that entailed another refit. The expected delivery was initially delayed to 2013.

The delay issues were compounded by repeated cost overruns, leading to a series of negotiations between the two governments in the late 2000s and into 2010, along with significant internal debate in India over whether to proceed with the project at all. In 2009, the Comptroller and Auditor General of India (CAG) criticised the deal, arguing that the ship was not worth the cost, and that funds would be better directed to a new carrier. The Indian Navy Chief of Naval Staff, Admiral Sureesh Mehta, defended the acquisition on the basis that Vikramaditya was still cheaper than building a new carrier. Eventually, on 10 March 2010, the two governments finalised the price of Admiral Gorshkov at US$2.35 billion.

In April 2010, a scandal over the project emerged when it was announced that a senior Indian Navy officer had probably been blackmailed to influence the negotiations over the cost of Admiral Gorshkov to India. Commodore Sukhjinder Singh had been a senior figure supervising the refit of the carrier, working as the principal director for the project. "Photographs showing him in intimate situations with women" allegedly taken during his 3-year overseas service in Russia were mailed to Navy headquarters in a CD. Several photos were later leaked to the Indian press. He was discharged from service due to this incident.

=== Conversion work ===
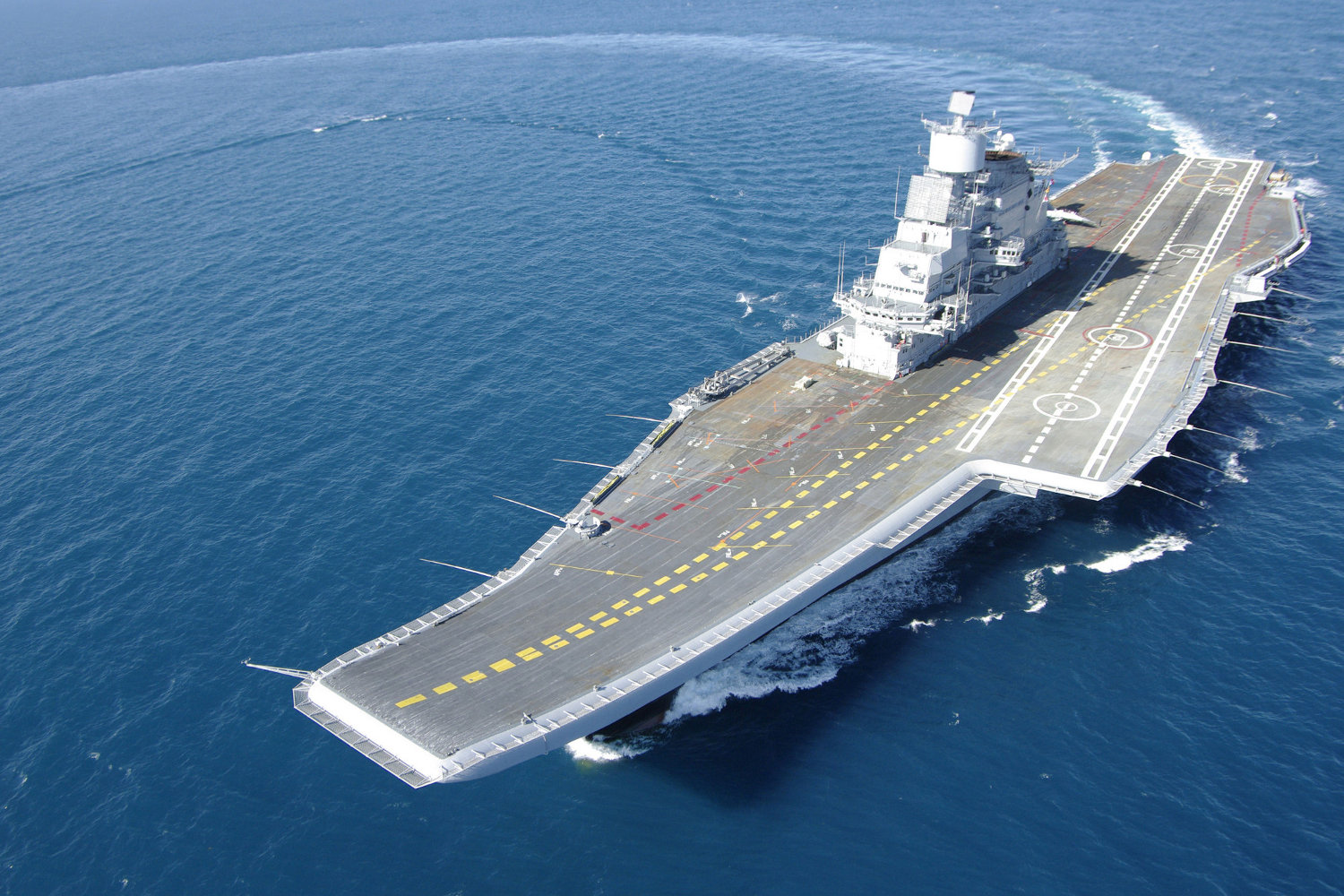
Vikramaditya during sea trials following her conversion

The hull work was completed by 2008, and Vikramaditya was launched on 4 December 2008. Around 99% of the structural work and almost 50% of the cabling work had been completed by June 2010. Nearly all of the large equipment, including engines and diesel generators, was installed. A naval MiG-29K prototype aircraft was used to test the deck systems of Vikramaditya in 2010.

All reconfiguration work was completed at Severodvinsk, Russia, but it was delayed by three years due to an underestimation of the amount of cabling needed. An expert-level discussion on technical and financial matters was held between India and Russia to resolve the issues. The MiG-29K entered operational service with India in February 2010. A compromise was finalised, and India was to pay an extra undisclosed amount. Russia was to install new systems instead of repairing the old ones.

On 1 June 2010, The Times of India reported a naval officer saying: "With India earlier this year agreeing to the revised refit cost of $2.33 billion for Gorshkov after three years of bitter wrangling since the earlier agreement signed in January 2004 had earmarked only $974 million for it, Russia has appointed a high-level apex committee to oversee the work on the carrier". The ship was to go for harbour trials by early 2011 to ensure she could be handed over to India by around December 2012. Dock trials began on 1 March 2011. These trials focused on the main power generation units and the radio-electronic armament systems, manufactured in India. Indian Navy personnel began training on Vikramaditya in April 2011. On 19 April 2012, it was announced that all internal systems were functioning, and the ship was entirely self-contained. The ship's magnetic field and centre of gravity were measured before sea trials began.

== New design ==
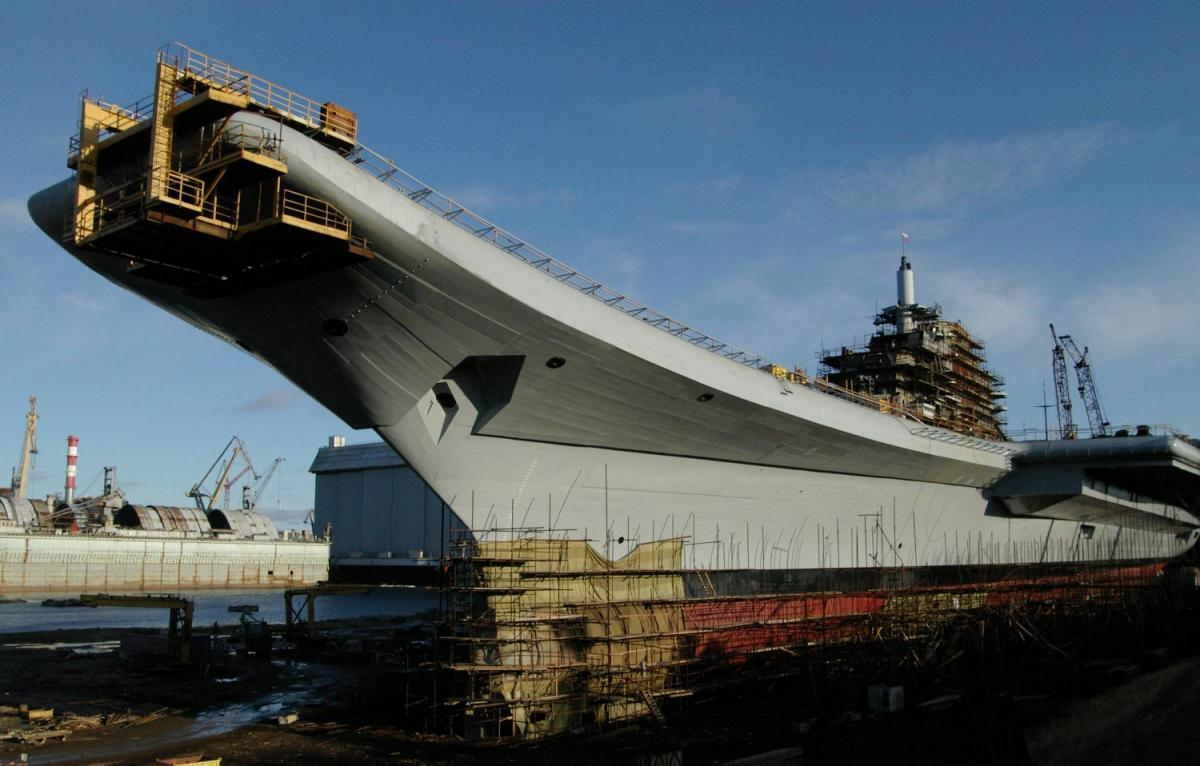
The conversion of the ship saw all the armament removed from the foredeck, including the P-500 Bazalt cruise missile launchers and the four sets of 3K95 Kinzhal surface-to-air missile launchers, to make way for a 14.3° bow ski jump.

As completed, Vikramaditya has a larger full load displacement than when the ship was originally launched in 1982 as Baku; 1,750 out of 2,500 compartments of the vessel were refabricated, and extensive recabling was done to support new radars and sensors. The elevators were upgraded, and two restraining stands were fitted, allowing combat aircraft to reach full power before making a ski jump-assisted short take-off. Three arresting gears were fitted on the aft of the angled deck, and navigation and carrier-landing aids were added to support fixed-wing "short take-off but arrested recovery" (STOBAR) operations.

=== Structural modifications ===
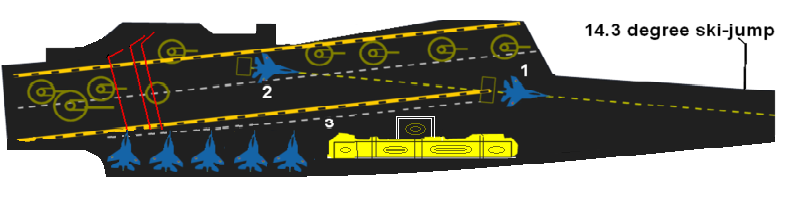
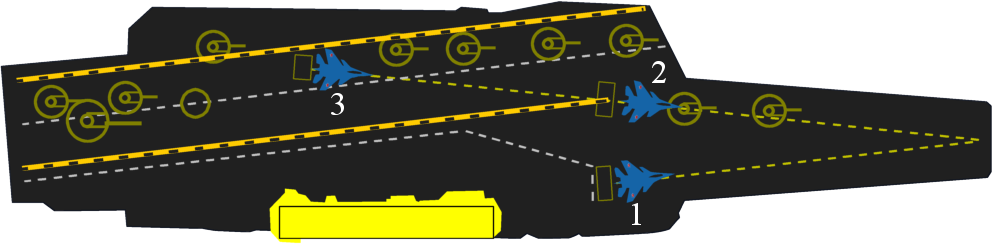
Comparison of the handling arrangements of Vikramaditya (left) and the Russian aircraft carrier Admiral Kuznetsov (right). Admiral Kuznetsov has positions for launching 3 aircraft at once, while Vikramaditya only has launch positions for 2.

The major modifications were to allow Admiral Gorshkov to operate as a STOBAR aircraft carrier in Indian service, as opposed to the STOVL configuration the ship was built as. This involved removal of all the armament, including the P-500 Bazalt cruise missile launchers and the four Antey Kinzhal surface-to-air missile bins fitted on the ship's bow, to make way for a 14.3°, full-width ski-jump. The 20-ton capacity aircraft lift beside the ship's island superstructure was unchanged, but the aft lift was enlarged, and its lift capacity increased to 30 tons. For STOBAR operations, three 30 m arrestor wires and three restraining gears on the stern of the angled deck were equipped. Sponsons were installed to increase flight deck area, allow the ski-jump to be fitted, for strengthening of arresting gear and runway area, and to lengthen the after end, which allowed an increase to the length of the landing strip aft of the arresting gear. 234 new hull sections were installed to achieve the desired shape, and the total steel added to carry out these modifications amounted to 2500 tons.

The superstructure profile was designed to accommodate the fixed phased array scanners of the Soviet Navy's Mars-Passat 3D air search radar system, along with extensive command and control facilities to conduct an aerial campaign. Extensive revamp of sensors was carried out, with long-range air-surveillance radars and advanced electronic warfare suites fitted, which enable the maintenance of a surveillance bubble of over 500 km around the ship. An aft mast was installed to accommodate various communication antennae. These changes needed 2,300 km of new cables and 3,000 km of new pipes.

The eight original boilers were replaced by new generation, high-pressure boilers, converted to take diesel fuel utilising LSHSD (→ Low Sulphur High Speed Diesel) instead of mazut, each providing a steam capacity of 100 tonnes per hour. The new boilers are highly efficient and have high levels of automation. They power four propellers in a four-shaft configuration, producing a total thrust of 180,000 horsepower (134,226 kW) at the shaft, providing a top speed of over 30 knots. Six turbo alternators and six diesel alternators generate 18 MW of electricity to power various equipment. Modern oil-water separators, as well as a sewage treatment plant, were incorporated to meet international standards. Six new Finnish Wärtsilä 1.5 MW diesel generators, a Global Marine communications system, Sperry Bridgemaster navigation radar, a new telephone exchange, new data link and an IFF Mk XI system were added. Residential services were improved with the addition of two reverse osmosis plants producing 400 tons of fresh water per day, as well as updated refrigeration and air conditioning. A new galley was installed with improved domestic services and accommodation for 10 female officers.

=== Combat systems ===
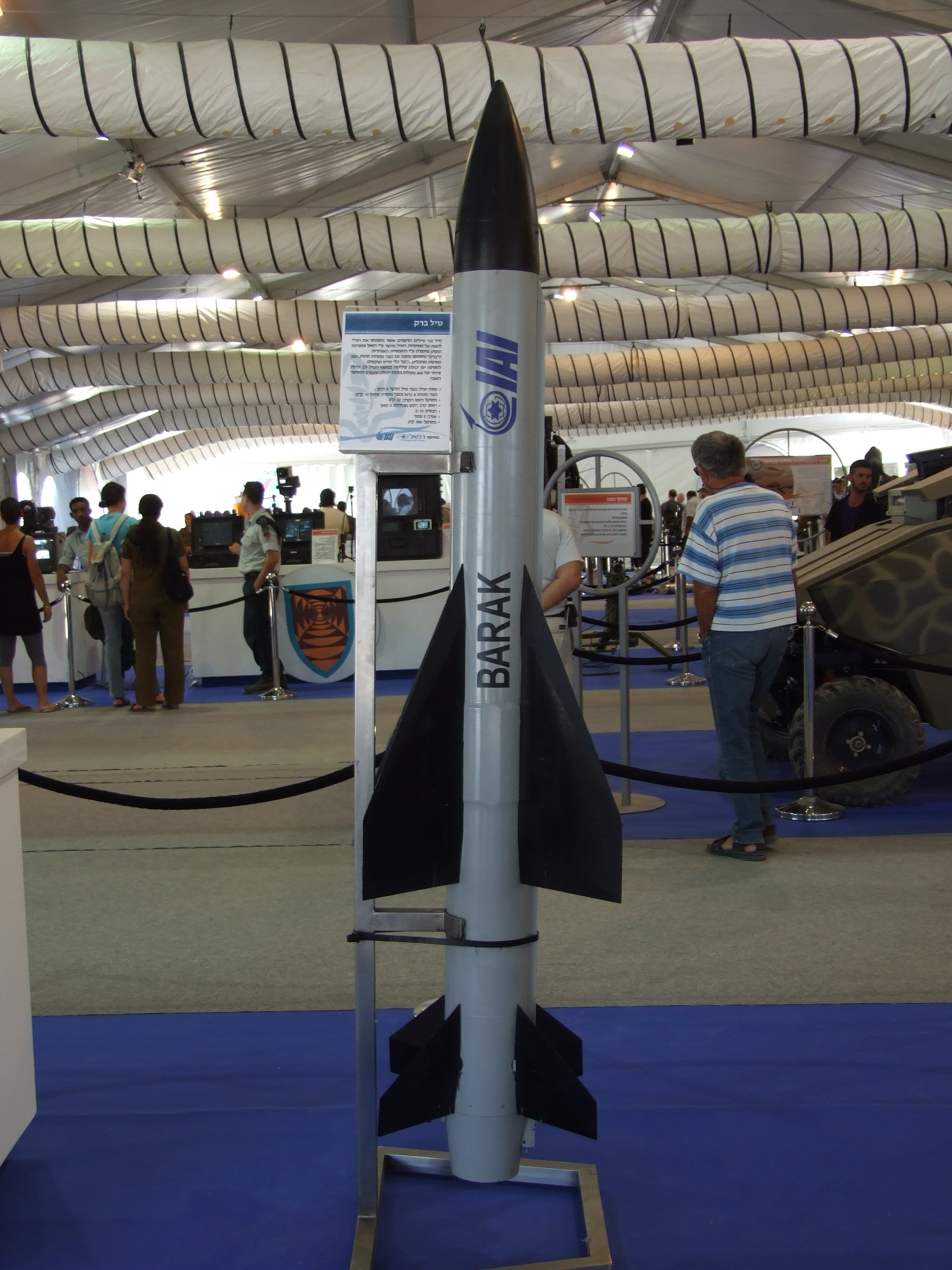
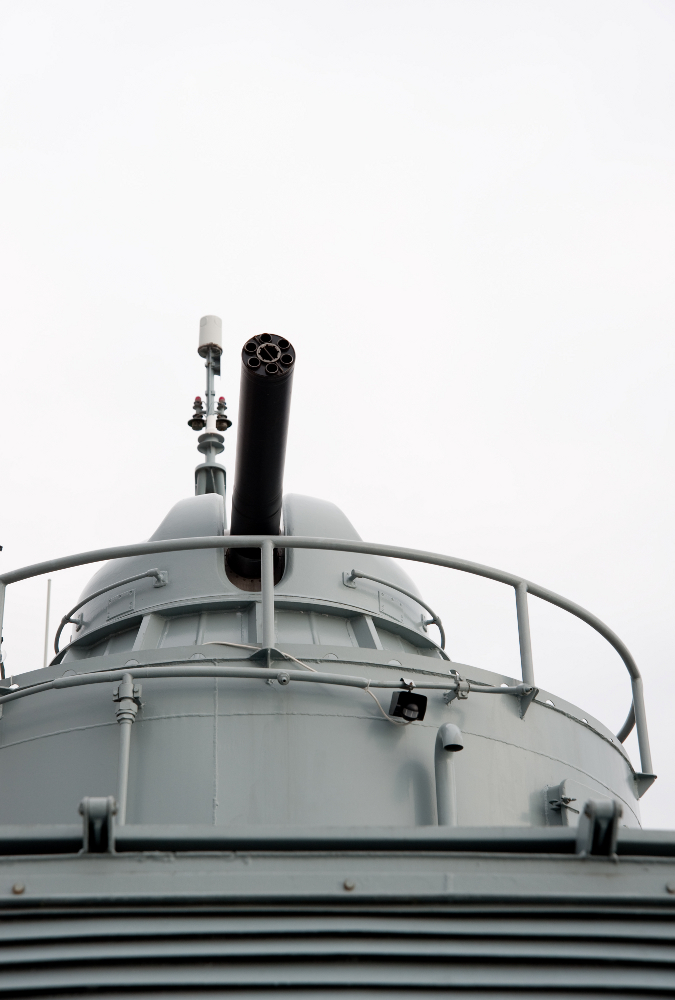
Barak 1 SAM and AK-630 CIWS

The combat systems on board the carrier are controlled by LESORUB-E, the computer-aided action information system. It gathers data from the ship's sensors and data links and creates comprehensive situational awareness. The CCS Mk II communication complex is installed for external communications and the Link II tactical data system enables integration into the Indian Navy's network-centric operations. Modern launch and recovery systems are installed for handling different aircraft – the LUNA landing system for MiG-29Ks and the DAPS Landing system for Sea Harriers. The Resistor-E automated air-traffic control system has been installed, which assists with approach, landing and short-range navigation down to a distance of 30 metres short of the flight deck to the pilots. Along with various other sub-systems, it provides navigation and flight data to ship-borne aircraft operating at long distances from the carrier.

When delivered, Vikramaditya had yet to be fitted with any onboard armament, leaving her dependent on her battle group for self-defence. Gun and missile-based (Barak 1 or Shtil-1) CIWS was reported to be introduced during a short refit in Karwar in April–June 2015. The short range missile systems would be replaced by LR-SAM (32 to 48 missiles) post completion of its development. The aircraft carrier was fitted with a Barak-1 missile system from the decommissioned INS Godavari during a short refit in Karwar after a year-long operational deployment. Earlier the ship was equipped with four AK-630 CIWS systems. As of 2022, the LR-SAM system has not been installed and the ship is equipped with 3 Barak in 2×4 VLS configuration, a total of 24 missiles.

The official expected life span of the ship is 40 years, and she is unlikely to require any major repair work for at least a decade. Over 70% of the vessel and her equipment is new, and the remainder has been refurbished. Sevmash Shipyard, which upgraded the carrier, will provide warranty servicing, including maintenance for the next 20 years.

=== Carrier Battle Group ===
The Carrier Battle Group (CBG) led by Vikramaditya includes Kolkata-class destroyers, Talwar-class frigates and INS Deepak among others.

=== Air Group ===
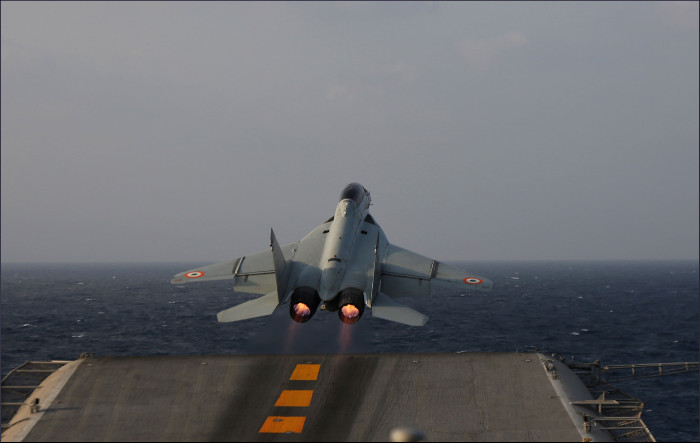
MiG 29K takes off from INS Vikramaditya

Vikramaditya has been designed as a STOBAR carrier capable of operating both conventional fixed-wing aircraft and helicopters, with up to 34 aircraft capable of being accommodated. Its primary embarked aircraft type is the Mikoyan MiG-29K, a navalised version of the Mikoyan MiG-29M. The MiG-29K is an advanced, all-weather multi-role fighter capable of undertaking both the fleet air defence, low-level strike and anti-shipping roles. The primary ASW platform is the venerable Westland Sea King, while the Kamov Ka-31 undertakes AEW. Carriage ranges given for the ship seem to converge around 16–24 MiG-29K and 10 Kamov Ka-31 or Dhruv helicopters; however, Vikramaditya cannot operate fixed-wing AEW aircraft owing to her configuration as a STOBAR carrier. Utility and plane guard duties are undertaken by the HAL Chetak (or HAL Dhruv).

Squadron	Name	Insignia	Aircraft	Notes
INAS 300	White Tigers		MiG 29KUB	
INAS 303	The Black Panthers		MiG 29K	
INAS 321	The Angels		HAL Chetak	
INAS 322	The Guardians		HAL Dhruv	
INAS 330	The Harpoons		Sea King	
INAS 339	The Falcons		Kamov Ka-31	

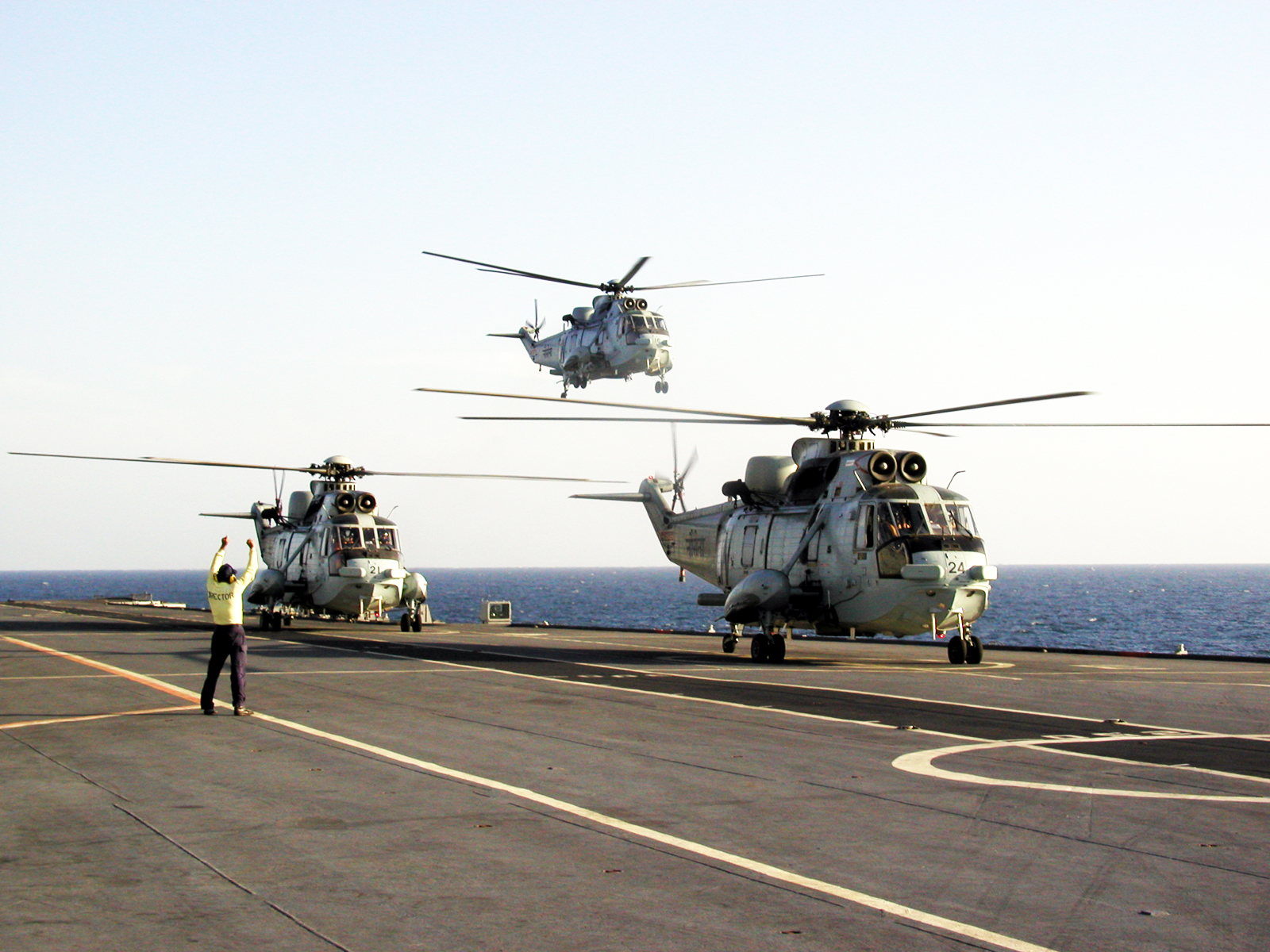
The Westland Sea King is used in the ASW role

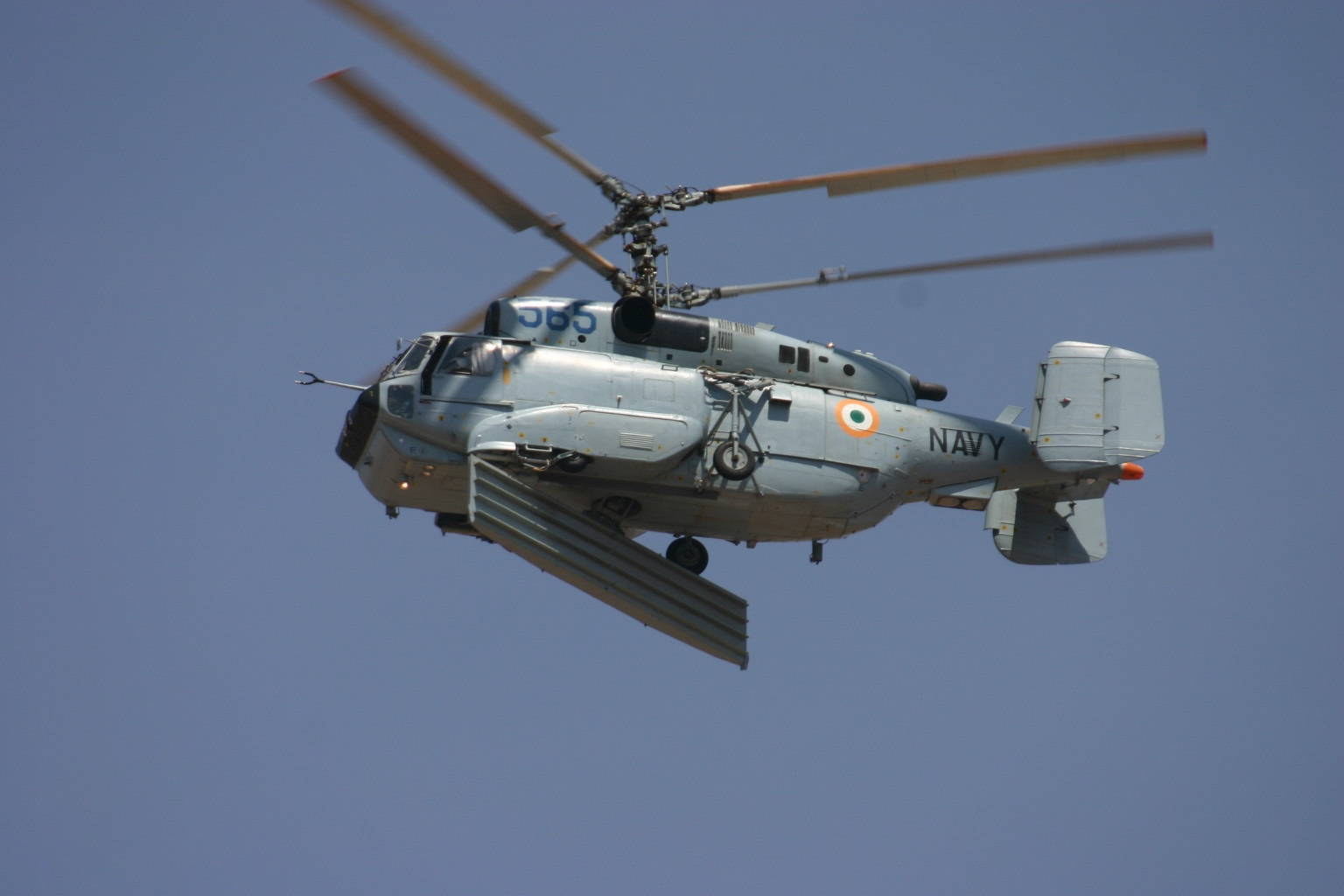
Kamov Ka-31 "Helix" performs the AEW role.

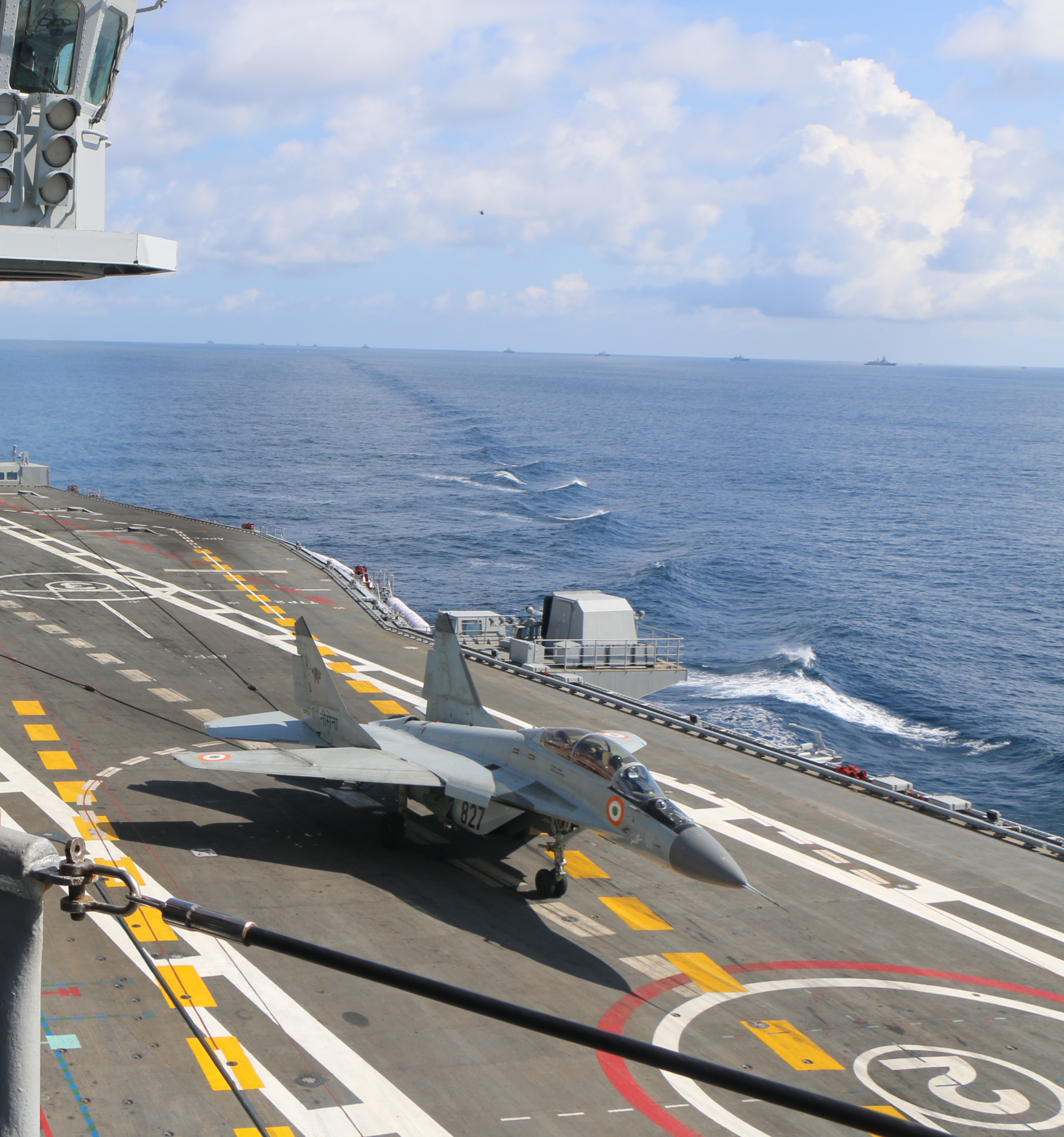
The MiG-29K provides both the fleet air defence and strike elements of the air group.

The Tejas makes its first landing aboard Vikramaditya in January 2020

== Sea trials and commissioning ==
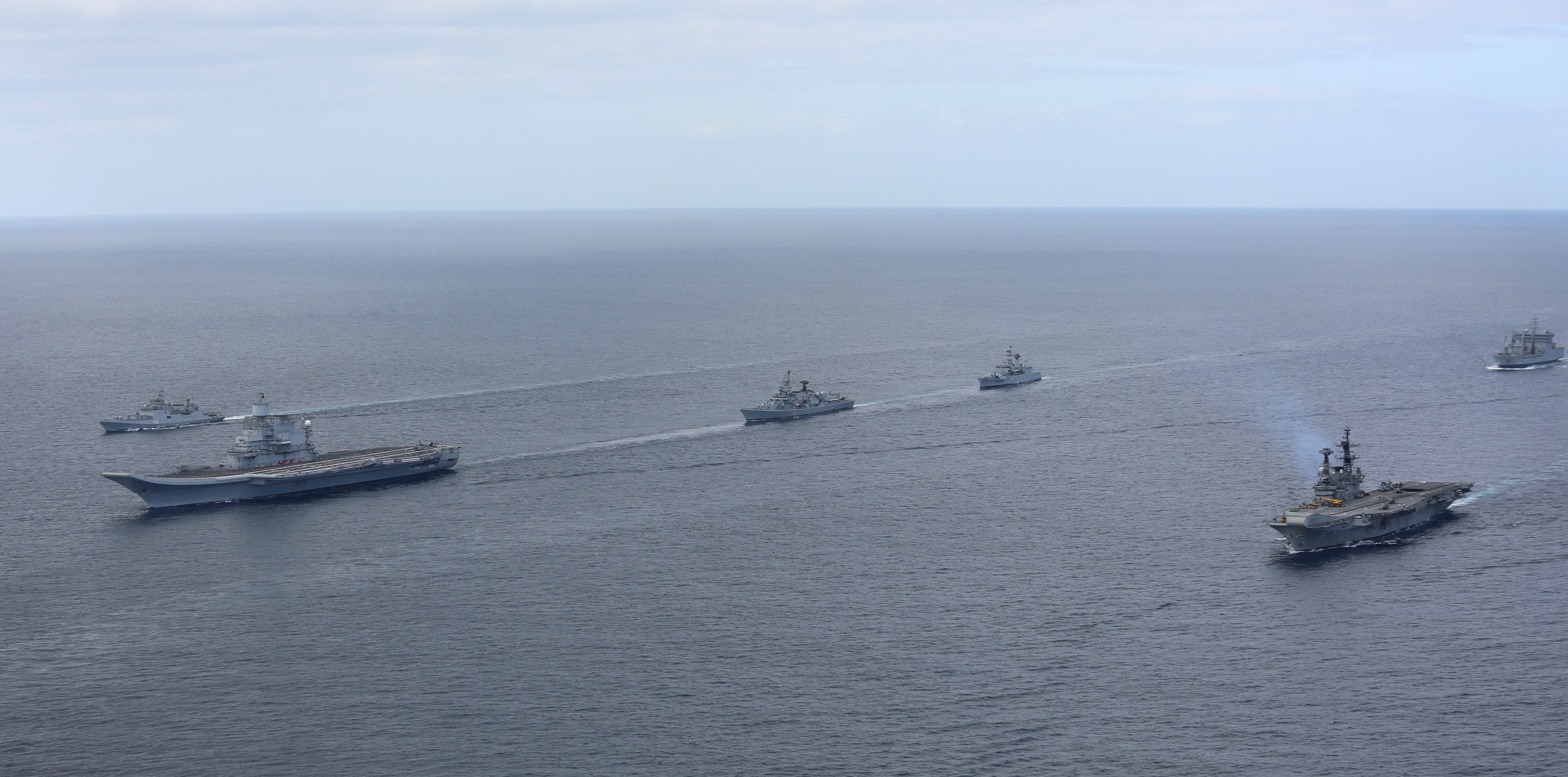
Indian Navy flotilla with aircraft carriers Vikramaditya and Viraat.

=== First sea trials ===
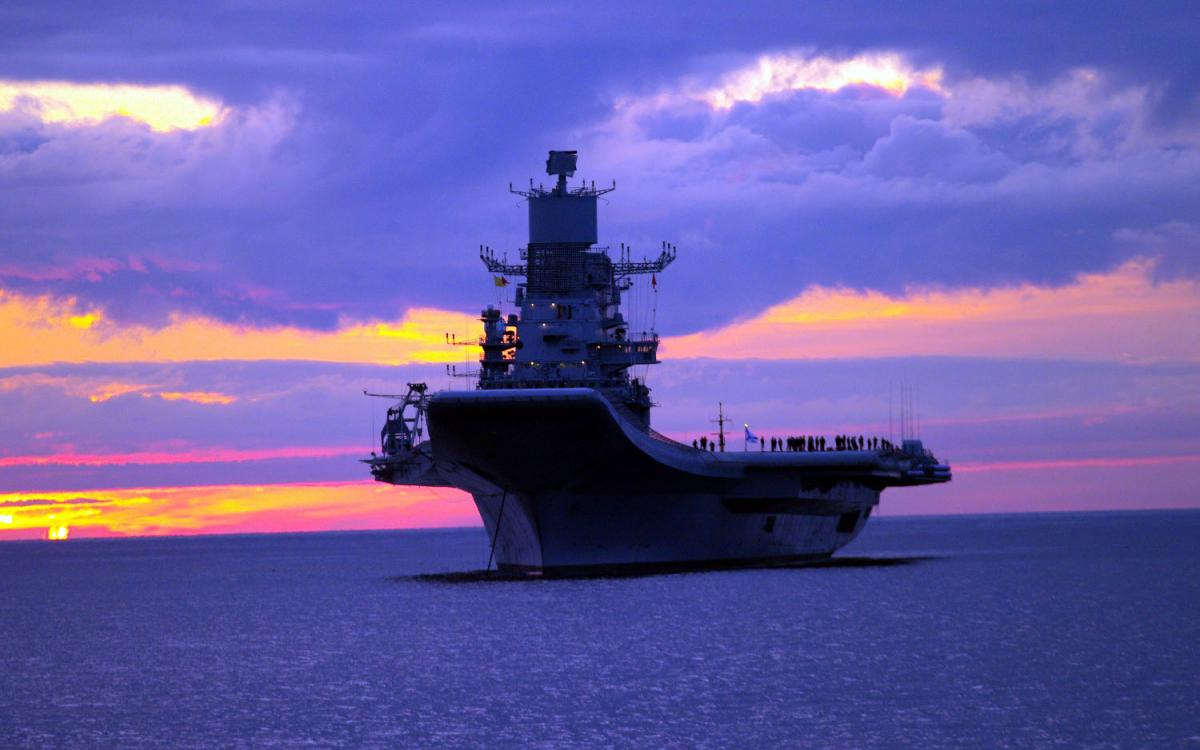
Vikramaditya in the Baltic Sea during sea trials in 2013

Russia was scheduled to hand over Vikramaditya to India on 4 December 2012, with sea trials scheduled to begin on 29 May 2012. The sea trials began on 8 June. The ship sailed out for pre-delivery trials from the berth of the Sevmash shipyard in Russia's northern city of Severodvinsk. These trials were to include landing and take-off of fighter jets from the deck of the carrier.

On 17 September 2012, malfunctions were detected during trials. According to an official report, seven out of eight steam boilers of the propulsion machinery were out of order. Due to this, the deadline to hand over this ship to the Indian Navy was postponed again until October 2013. Later investigation has determined that the cause of the engine failure was poor workmanship and supervision. The Gorshkov and other ships of the 1143.4 class had a history of multiple boiler failures; however, Russian shipbuilders claimed that the problem was the low-grade Chinese-made fire bricks bought by the Indian Navy that were used in the boiler insulation instead of asbestos.

=== Second sea trials ===
On 3 July 2013, Igor Sevastyanov, deputy head of Russia's state arms exporter Rosoboronexport, announced that the warship had departed for sea trials with a mix of Russian and Indian crew. On 28 July 2013, it was reported that Vikramaditya had successfully completed her sea trials and was able to reach her maximum speed of 32 knots. She then proceeded to the White Sea for aviation trials, carried out by Russia's Northern Fleet aviation and completed in September 2013. Aircraft and helicopters flew around and over the ship to check the performance of its radar, air defence, communication and control systems, and MiG specialists praised the ski-jump ramp.

The sea trials lasted three months. The carrier's electronic warfare and jamming capability was demonstrated when Sukhoi-33s, Kamovs, MiG-29s and A-50 early warning aircraft failed to "paint" the carrier using their radars, whereas the incoming aircraft were detected by the ship at a distance of 350–400 kilometres (220–250 mi). In total, the ship sailed for 31,400 kilometres (19,500 mi) during both trials, controlled 778 aircraft and helicopter flights, and conducted 88 landings by Russian pilots. During the second sea trial, she sailed for 13,800 kilometres (8,600 mi), of which 2,700 kilometres (1,700 mi) were under the command of the ship's Indian captain Commodore Suraj Berry.

=== Surveillance by NATO ===
During sea trials, a Lockheed P-3 Orion patrol aircraft observed Vikramaditya. While in international waters, it flew close to the ship to take photographs and dropped sonobuoys to record the ship's acoustic signature. The aircraft left the area when a Russian MiG-29 fighter arrived. A Norwegian ship was also seen to observe Vikramaditya.

=== Commissioning ===
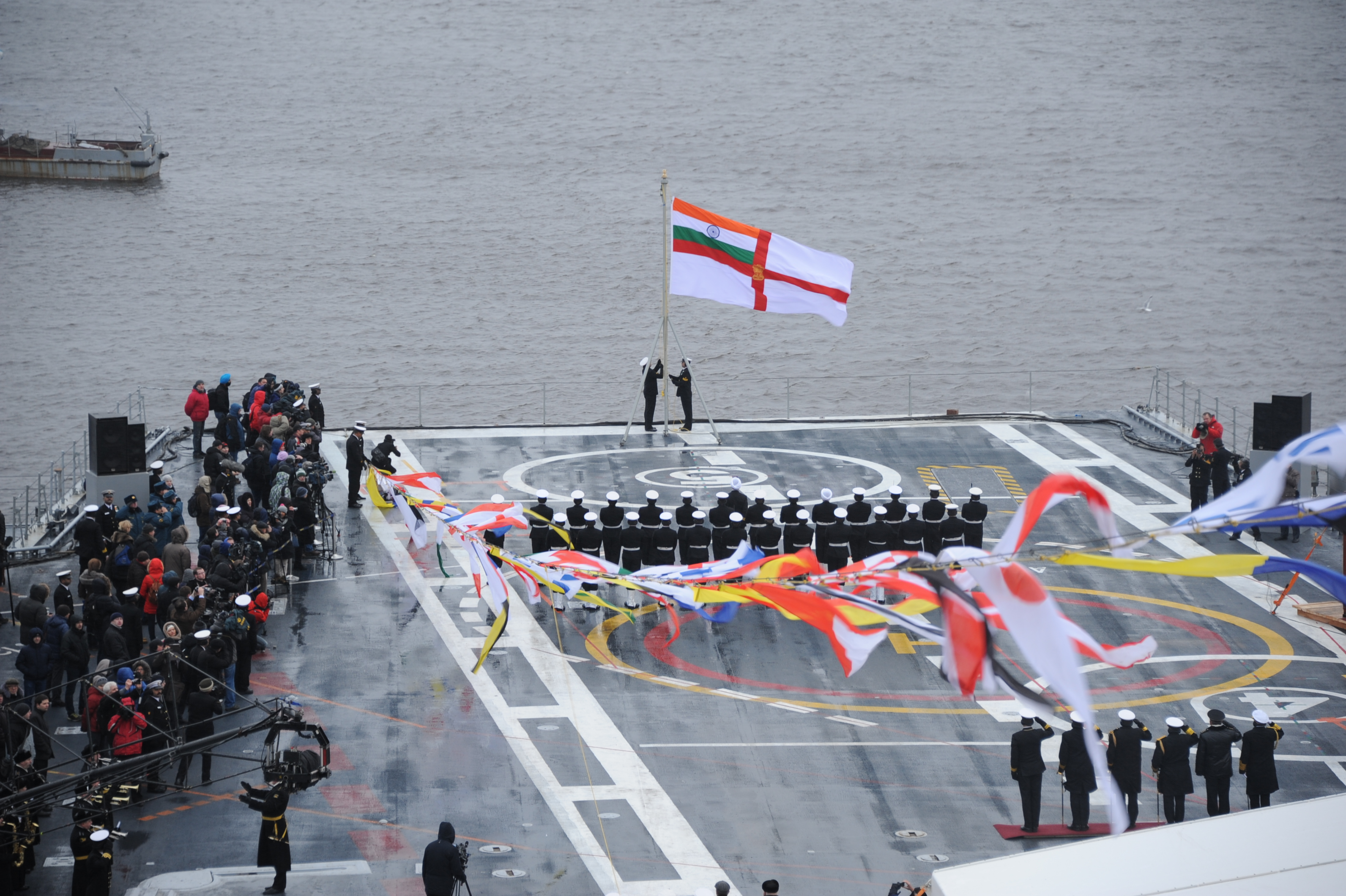
The Indian Navy ensign is hoisted aboard Vikramaditya as she is commissioned at Sevmash Shipyard in Russia.

The ship was formally commissioned on 16 November 2013 at a ceremony held at Severodvinsk, Russia. The ceremony was attended by the Indian defence minister A. K. Antony and the Russian deputy prime minister Dmitry Rogozin.

== Service history ==
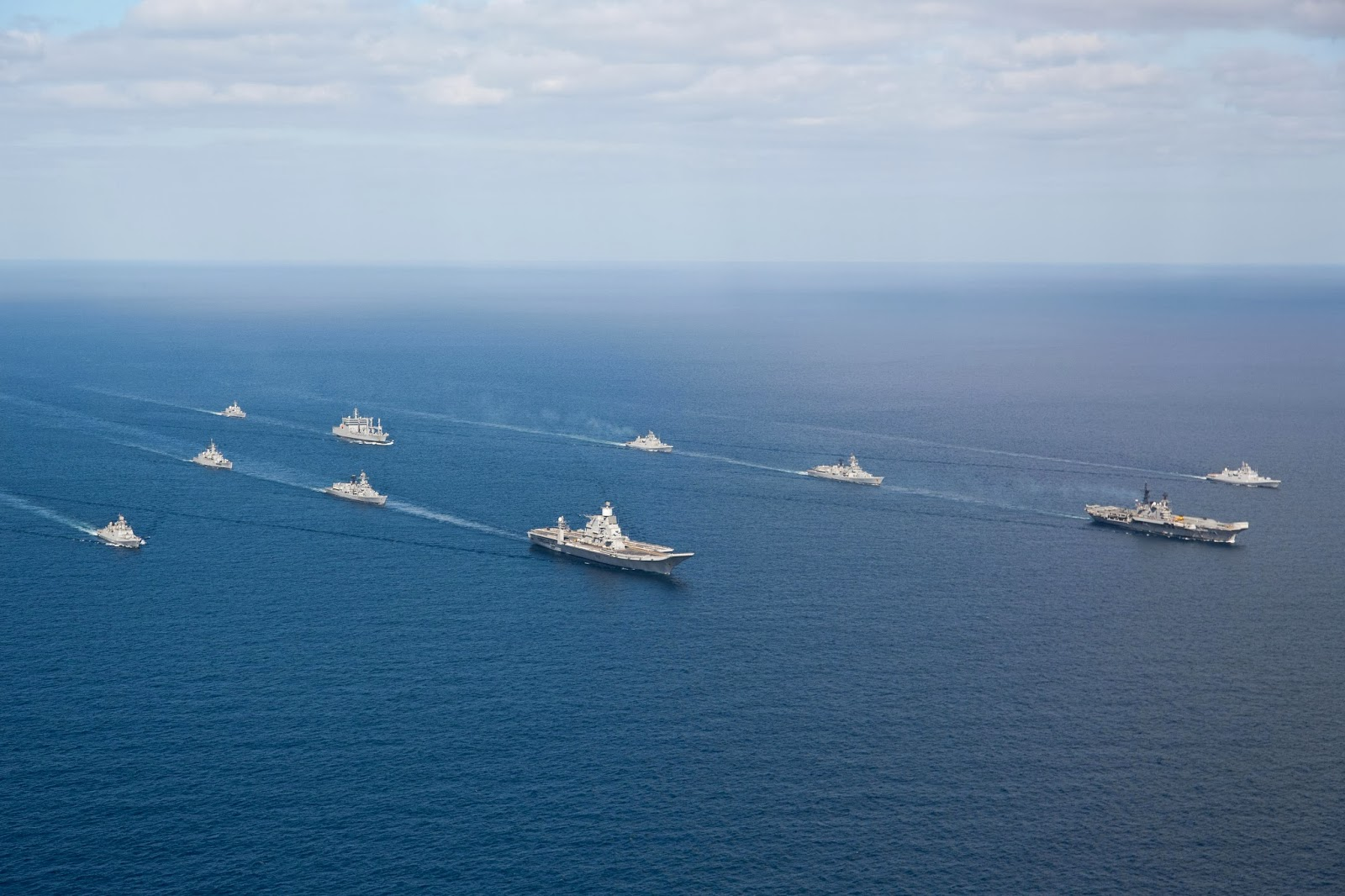
Vikramaditya being escorted by INS Viraat and other ships of the Western Fleet in the Arabian Sea.

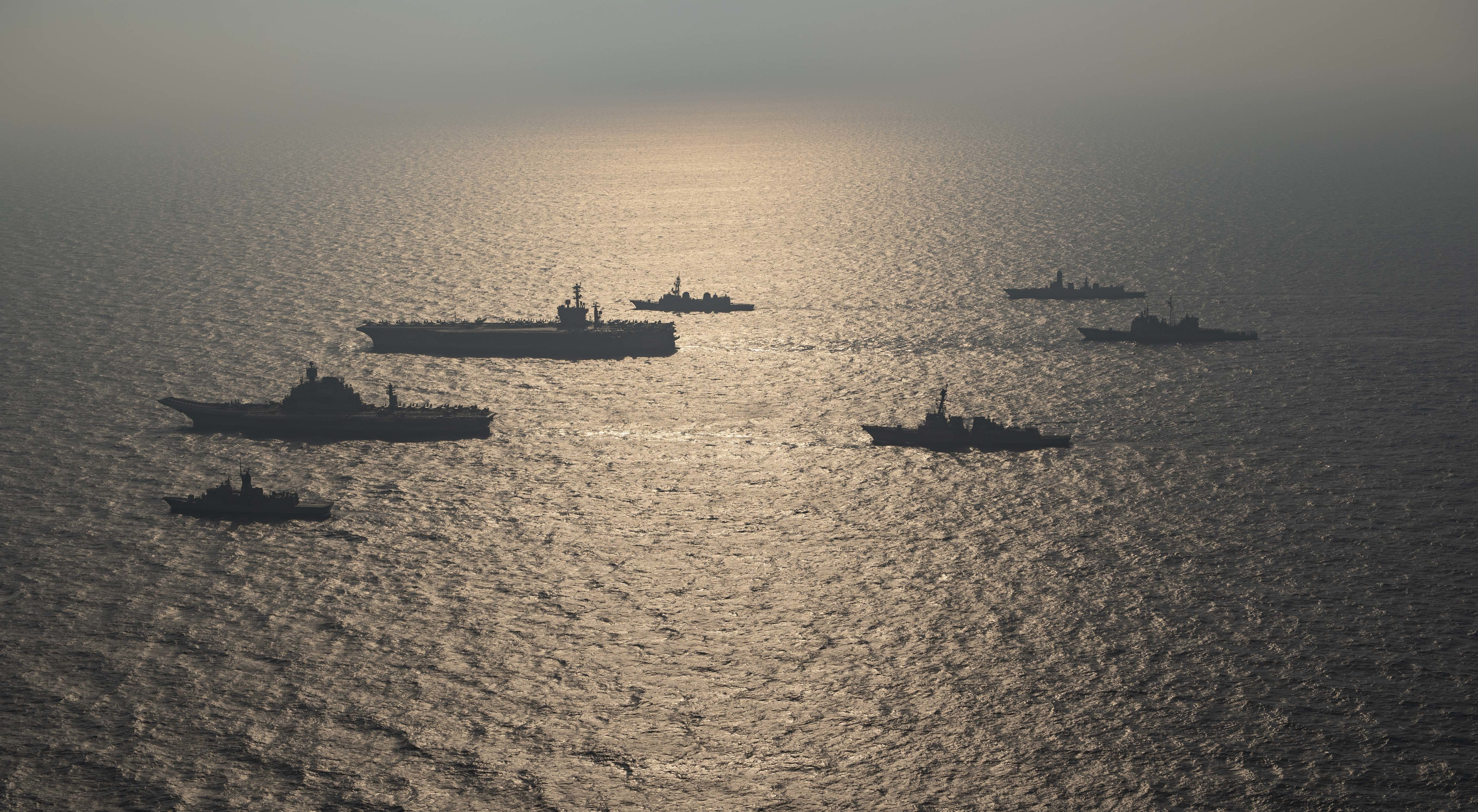
INS Vikramaditya with ships of Royal Australian Navy, Japan Maritime Self-Defense Force and the United States Navy during Malabar 2020 .

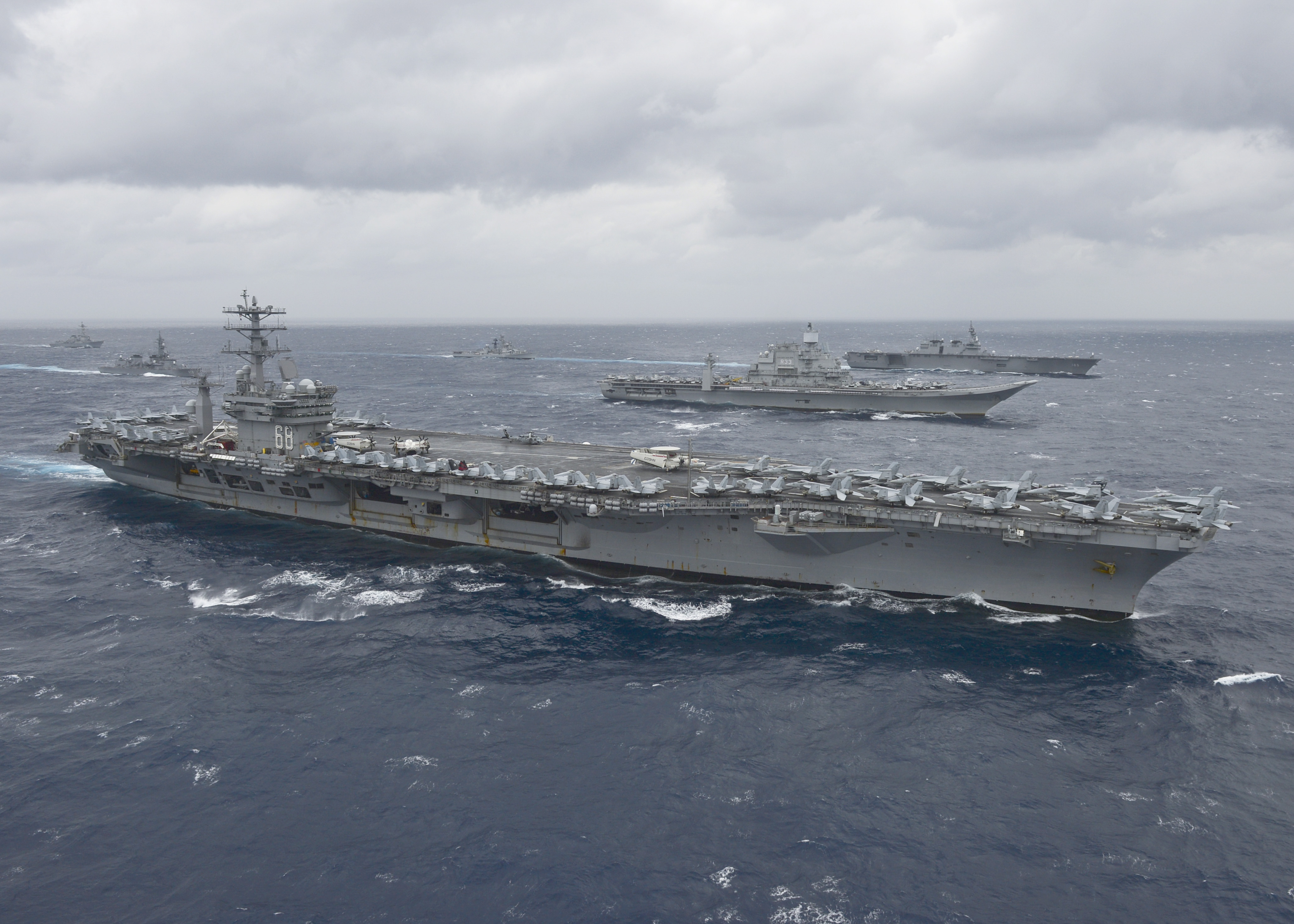
Vikramaditya (centre) alongside USS Nimitz (foreground) and JS Izumo (background) during Exercise Malabar in July 2017

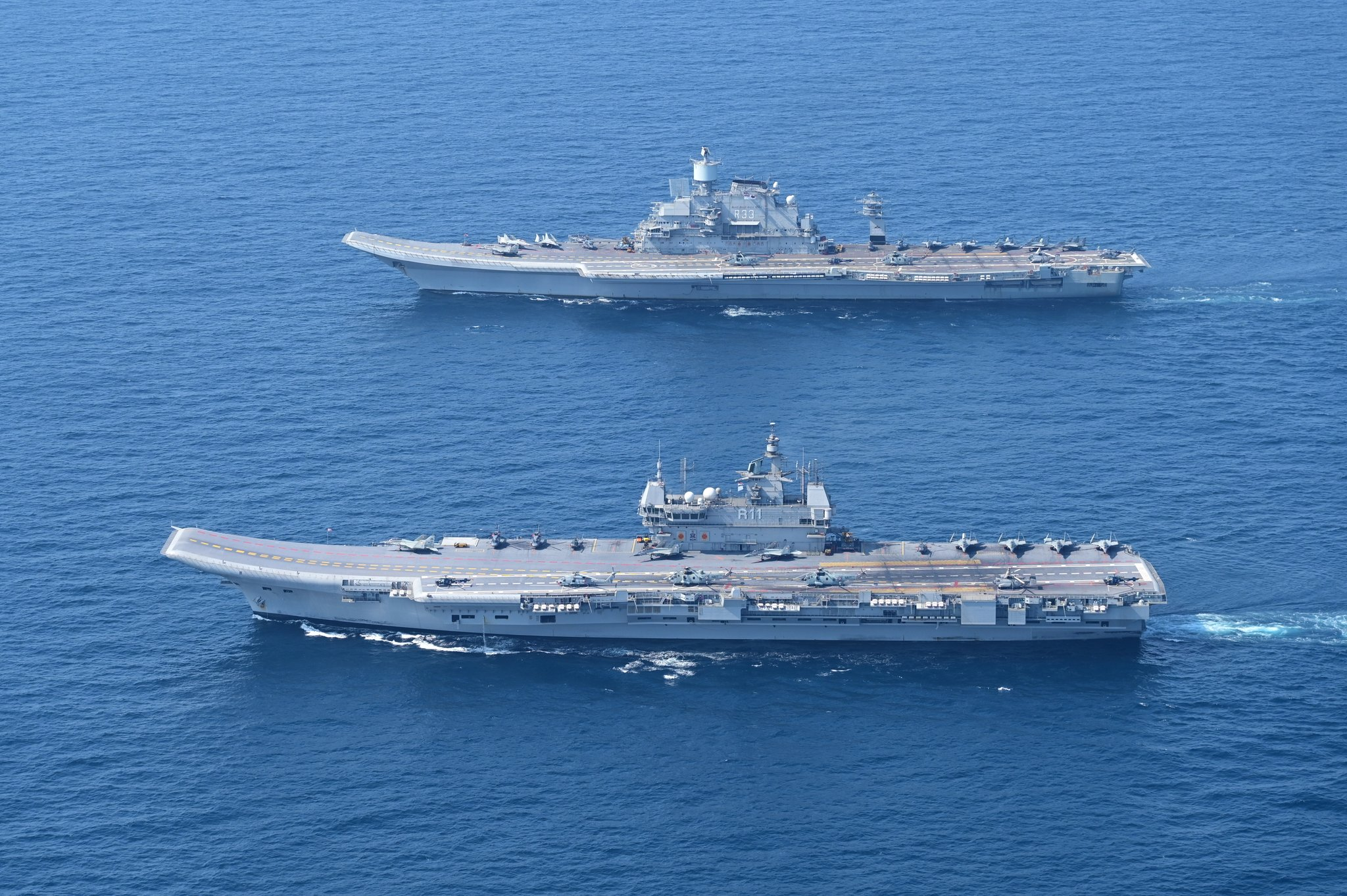
INS Vikramaditya with INS Vikrant during a multi-carrier operations in Arabian Sea

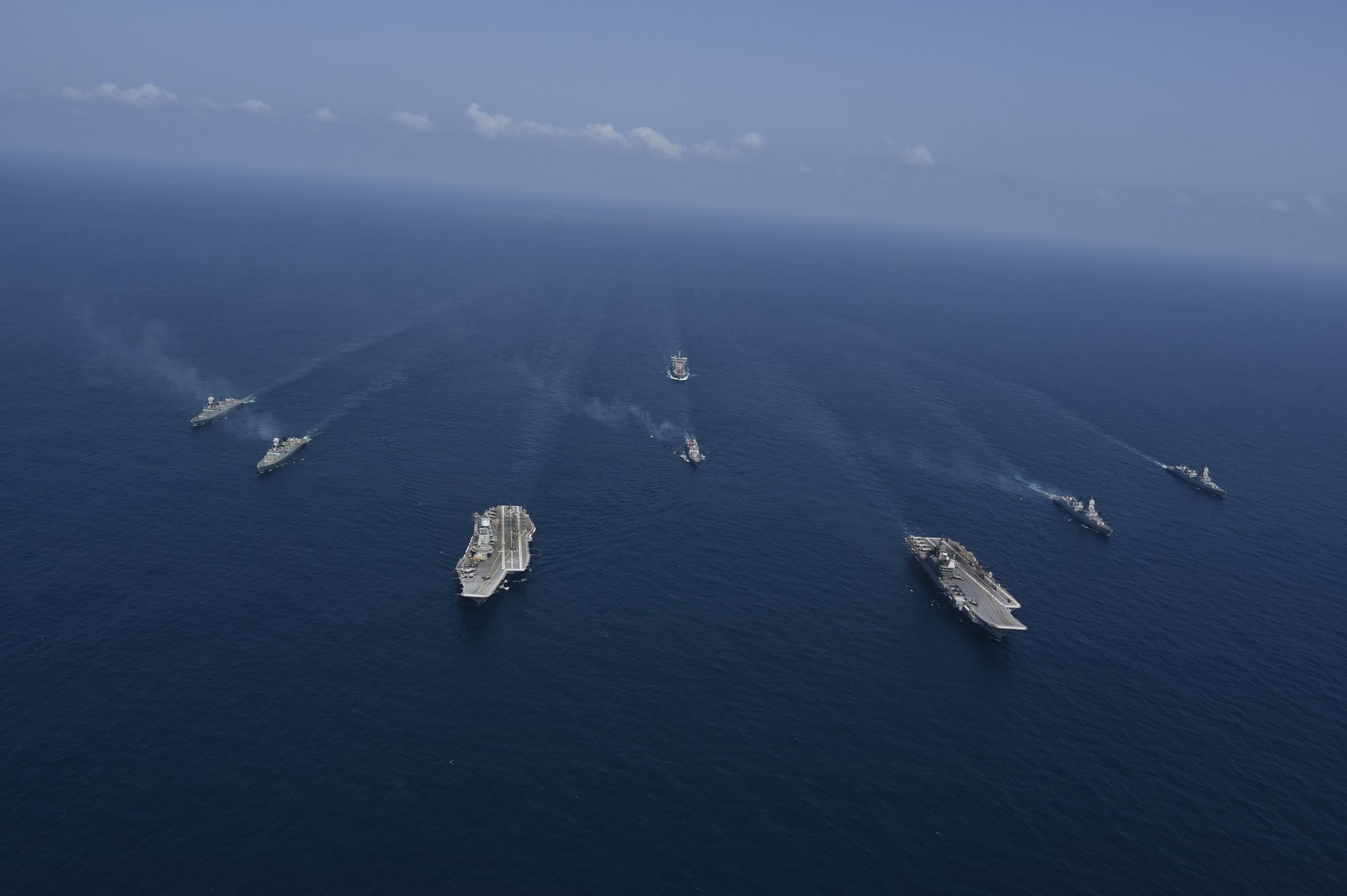
Vikramaditya with Vikrant during an exercise with carrier battle group

After commissioning, the carrier began a continuous 26-day journey of 10,212 nmi (18,913 km; 11,752 mi) to its homeport at INS Kadamba, Karwar, from Severodvinsk on 27 November 2013, with a short stopover in Lisbon. She was under the command of Commodore Suraj Berry, her first Indian captain. Apart from her Indian crew, she also carried 177 Russian specialists from Sevmash, who would remain on board for one year, as part of the 20-year post-warranty services contract with the shipyard. During the journey, she encountered a storm in the Barents Sea, where she linked up with her escorts frigate INS Trikand and fleet tanker INS Deepak. The group was escorted by the Royal Navy frigate HMS Monmouth while passing through the English Channel and was joined by destroyer INS Delhi near Gibraltar.

The flotilla sailed in the Mediterranean Sea, passed through the Suez Canal and entered the Arabian Sea near the Gulf of Aden on 1 January 2014. She was received nearly 1,200 nautical miles (2,200 km; 1,400 mi) away from Indian shores by a large flotilla of the Western fleet. It was composed of the aircraft carrier INS Viraat, two Delhi-class destroyers, three Talwar-class frigates, the frigate INS Godavari, and a couple of offshore patrol vessels, including INS Subhadra. The event was significant as the Indian Navy operated two aircraft carriers simultaneously for the first time in 20 years. After conducting basic sea exercises with the fleet, Vikramaditya reached Karwar on 7 January 2014.

Navy pilots of INAS 303 "Black Panthers" operating the MiG-29K practised carrier operations at the shore-based test facility (SBTF) in INS Hansa, Dabolim, Vasco-da-Gama. The first aircraft piloted by an Indian Navy pilot landed on the carrier on 8 February 2014. Since then, the pilots and air controllers have been certified to operate the MiG-29K fighters from the carrier deck, including night landings. The carrier's air wing will consist of 16 MiG-29Ks, including four KUB trainers, six airborne early warning and control (AEW&C) Kamov Ka-31 and Kamov Ka-28 anti-submarine warfare (ASW) helicopters.

In May 2014, the carrier was declared operationally deployed along with its embarked air group comprising MiG-29Ks and had taken part in a war game conducted by the Western Naval Command. On 14 June 2014, the Prime Minister of India dedicated the carrier to the country.

On 21–22 January 2016, Vikramaditya, accompanied by INS Mysore, made her first overseas port visit when the ship visited Colombo in Sri Lanka, making the first visit of an Indian warship to the city in 30 years, and the first by an aircraft carrier in more than 40 years.

On 15–18 February 2016, Vikramaditya accompanied by two ships, Mysore and Deepak, made a goodwill visit to Malé, Maldives.

A State Bank of India ATM was opened onboard Vikramaditya on 21 January 2017, making her the first Indian Navy ship to have an ATM.

In January 2020, Vikramaditya was used to undertake the first carrier trials of the naval version of the HAL Tejas Light Combat Aircraft. Over eight to ten days, the Tejas was launched and recovered several times as part of the aircraft's initial test phase. The Tejas was the first indigenous Indian aircraft to both land on and take off from an Indian aircraft carrier.

In June 2023, Indian Navy showcased the dual carrier operations including INS Vikramaditya and INS Vikrant (R11). The exercise included 35 aircraft including MiG 29K, MH 60R, Kamov Ka 31, Sea King, Chetak and HAL Dhruv. This helped in the integration of the aircraft carriers of the Indian Navy and displayed the maritime prowess of India.

In mid February 2024, Vikrant and Vikramaditya participated in Milan 2024 multinational naval exercise hosted by Indian Navy along with other ships, submarines and aircraft of friendly foreign nations. The concluding ceremony of the sea phase of the exercise was hosted on board Vikrant. In late February and early March 2024, the two carriers were again deployed for conducting joint operations on various locations along the Indian coastline with escorts. In the first week of March, while Vikramaditya was hosting the first half of the Indian Navy's Biannual Naval Commanders' Conference 2024, both carriers launched MiG-29K fighters simultaneously. In addition, the carriers accommodated and conveyed numerous reporters to report on the commissioning ceremony of INS Jatayu, located on Minicoy Island in the Lakshadweep archipelago on the southwest coast of mainland India.

On 20 August 2024, Vikrant officially joined the Western Fleet, when deployed for a multi-domain exercise and twin carrier fighter operations in the Arabian Sea along with the Carrier Battle Group (CBG) led by Vikramaditya. On 5 and 6 October, Carrier Strike Groups of the Indian Navy and the Italian Navy led by Vikramaditya and Cavour and accompanied by INS Visakhapatnam and Alpino participated in a maritime bilateral exercise in the Arabian Sea. The exercise included aircraft like MiG-29K, F-35B and AV-8B Harrier II and integral helicopters. Operations in the sea phase included intense flight operations with fighter jets and helicopters for combined Large Force Engagements, Air Combat Missions, Helicopter Operations and Search & Rescue missions as well as co-ordinated weapon firings & joint manoeuvres to enhance joint operations, Command & Control capabilities and interoperability. The exercise also saw the participation of the Indian Air Force. During the Harbour Phase from 1 to 4 October, the exercise saw Subject Matter Expert exchanges and other key interactions as well as a Pre-Sail Planning Conference.

The expected official life of Vikramaditya is 40 years. As of 3 February 2025, the carrier has an operational life of 10 years. The carrier is projected to serve until 2052, subject to a critical structural audit in 2035, otherwise Vikramaditya would be retired by 2037.

== Refits and overhaul ==
- In September 2016, Vikramaditya was dry-docked in Kochi for a month-long refit by Cochin Shipyards; the refit was completed in November, a month ahead of schedule.
- On 30 November 2024, the Ministry of Defence signed a contract with Cochin Shipyards for the Short Refit and Dry Docking (SRDD) of INS Vikramaditya at an overall cost of ₹1,207.5 crore (equivalent to ₹13 billion or US$130 million in 2026).

== Commanding officers ==
S. No.	Name	Assumed office	Left office	Notes
1	Captain Suraj Berry	16 November 2013	2 November 2015	Later Commander-in-Chief, Strategic Forces Command.
2	Captain Krishna Swaminathan	2 November 2015	20 July 2017	Current Chief of the Naval Staff.
3	Captain Ajay Kochhar	20 July 2017	26 May 2018	Current Vice Chief of the Naval Staff.
4	Captain Puruvir Das NM	26 May 2018	2019	Later Chief Instructor (Navy), DSSC Wellington.
5	Captain Rajesh Dhankhar NM	2019	2020	Current Deputy Chief of the Integrated Defence Staff (Doctrine, Organisation & Training).
6	Captain C. R. Praveen Nair NM	2020	3 December 2021	Current Controller of Personnel Services.
7	Captain Susheel Menon VSM	4 December 2021	6 May 2023	Current Chief of Staff, Eastern Naval Command.
8	Captain Vishal Bishnoi	6 May 2023	14 November 2024	Current Flag Officer Commanding Eastern Fleet.
9	Captain Sundeep Singh Randhawa	14 November 2024	September 2026	Current Flag Officer Sea Training.

== Affiliations ==
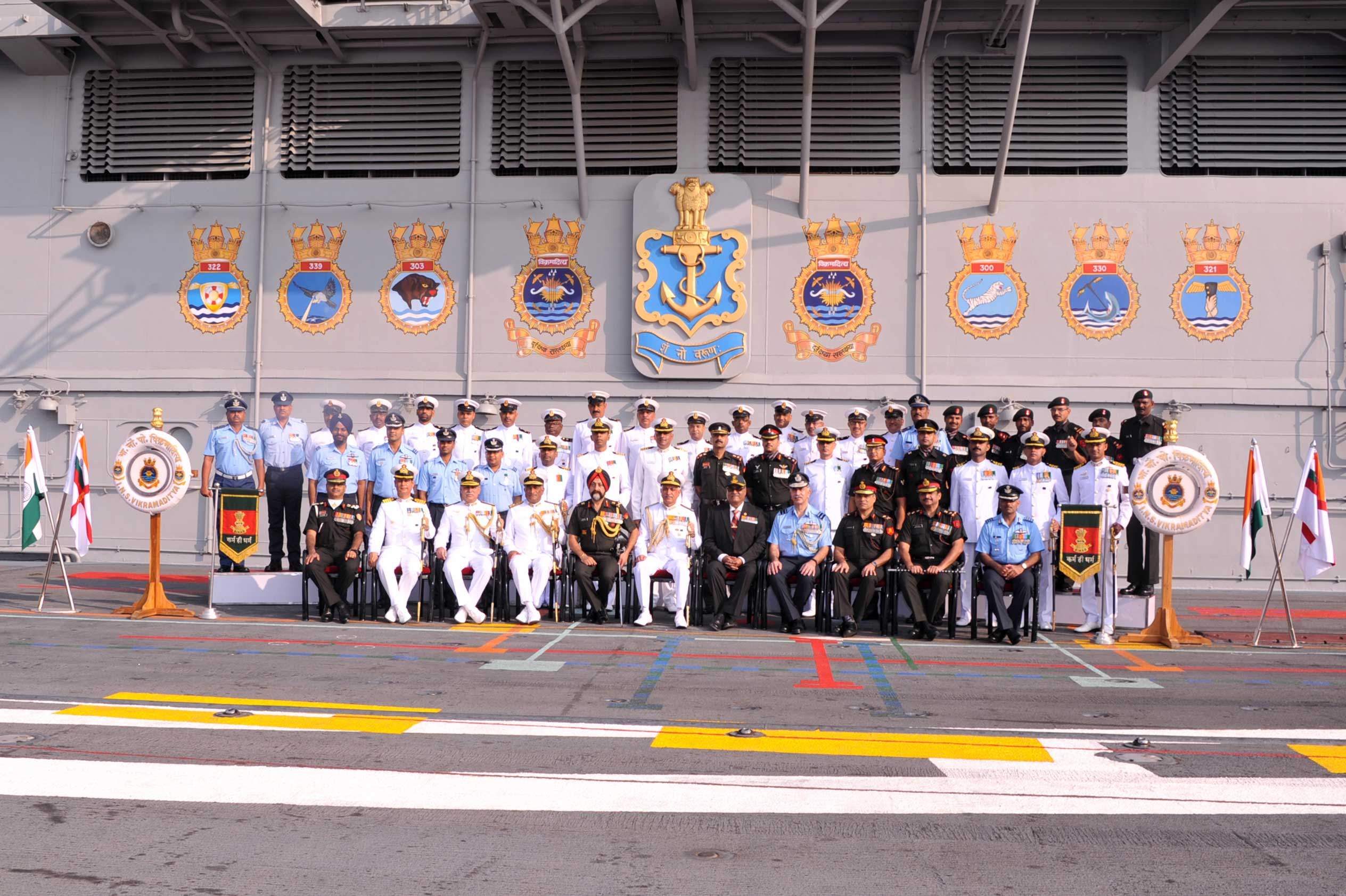
The Bihar Regiment posing aboard Vikramaditya, with which they are affiliated. In the background are insignia of all the squadrons affiliated with the ship.

On 17 January 2018, Vikramaditya was ceremonially affiliated to the following formations:

- Bihar Regiment
- No. 6 Squadron IAF

== Accidents and incidents ==
On 10 June 2016, while undergoing a scheduled major refit of INS Vikramaditya, two people were killed by a toxic gas leak that occurred during maintenance work in the Sewage Treatment Plant compartment of INS Vikramaditya at Karwar. Two other people were injured and taken to the naval hospital.

On 28 February 2017, a MiG-29K aircraft that took off from Vikramaditya had to make an emergency landing at Mangalore International Airport due to hydraulic failure.

On 26 April 2019, one naval officer died of smoke inhalation at Karwar's naval hospital INHS Patanjali, and seven others were injured after fighting a fire that erupted in the boiler room of Vikramaditya on her course to INS Kadamba.

A MiG 29KUB disembarking from INS Vikramaditya enroute to INS Hansa crashed in the sea on 26 November 2020, resulting in the death of a pilot, Commander Nishant Singh.

On 20 July 2022, a fire broke out during a planned sortie for conducting sea trials off Karwar in the Uttar Kannada district of Karnataka. No casualties were reported.

== See also ==
- List of active Indian Navy ships
- List of aircraft carriers in service
- List of naval ship classes in service
- Carrier battle groups of India
- Chinese aircraft carrier Liaoning – also originally laid down for the Soviet Navy.
- INS Vikrant (2013)
- INS Vishal

== Sources ==
- Verma, Bharat (2011). Indian Defence Review Vol. 26.3 Jul-sep 2011. Lancer Publication. ISBN 978-8170622314.
- Brien, Terry (2012). Twenty Twenty Gk Eng 2012. Tata McGraw-Hill Education. ISBN 978-1259001192.
