= List of Indian Navy bases =

The Indian Navy currently operates three commands — Western Naval Command located at Mumbai, Southern Naval Command located at Kochi and Eastern Naval Command located at Visakhapatnam. The Andaman and Nicobar Command, a unified Indian Navy, Army, Air Force and Coast Guard Command was set up in the Andaman and Nicobar Islands in 2001.

== List of naval establishments ==
Base	City	State/UT	Role
Shore Establishments
INS India	New Delhi	Delhi	Logistics and Administrative support; Naval Headquarters
INS Aravali	Gurugram	Haryana	Naval Information and Communication centre support to enhance C2 and MDA. Commissioned on 12 Sept 25 with the motto "Maritime Security through Collaboration".
Western Naval Command
INS Dwarka	Okha	Gujarat	Logistics and Maintenance support
INS Sardar Patel	Porbandar	Gujarat	Logistics and Administrative support
NAE Porbandar	Porbandar	Gujarat	Naval Air Enclave at Porbandar Airport
INS Angre	Mumbai	Maharashtra	Logistics and Administrative support
INS Abhimanyu	Mumbai	Maharashtra	MARCOS Base
INHS Sandhani	Mumbai	Maharashtra	Naval Hospital
INS Agnibahu	Mumbai	Maharashtra	Missile Boat Squadron Base; 22nd Missile Vessel Squadron
INHS Asvini	Mumbai	Maharashtra	Naval Hospital; Tri-service use
INS Shikra	Mumbai	Maharashtra	Naval Air Station
INS Tanaji	Mumbai	Maharashtra	Naval ammunition depot
INS Trata	Mumbai	Maharashtra	Coastal Missile Defence
INS Tunir	Mumbai	Maharashtra	Naval missile depot
NH Powai	Mumbai	Maharashtra	Naval Hospital
INS Vajrabahu	Mumbai	Maharashtra	Submarine base
NAE Santa Cruz	Mumbai	Maharashtra	Naval Air Enclave at Mumbai Airport
INS Gomantak	Vasco da Gama	Goa	Logistics and Administrative support (to HQ and units of Goa Naval Area)
INS Hansa	Dabolim	Goa	Naval Air Station
INHS Jeevanti	Vasco da Gama	Goa	Naval Hospital
INS Kadamba	Karwar	Karnataka	Logistics and Maintenance support
INS Vajrakosh	Karwar	Karnataka	Naval ammunition and missile depot
INHS Patanjali	Karwar	Karnataka	Naval Hospital
Southern Naval Command
INS Dweeprakshak	Kavaratti	Lakshadweep	Logistics and Maintenance support
INS Jatayu	Minicoy	Lakshadweep	Forward Operating Base
NavDet Androth	Androth	Lakshadweep	Naval Detachment and Radar station (since May 2016)
NavDet Bitra**	Bitra	Lakshadweep	Forward Operating Base Construction complete. To be fully functional from 2026.
INS Garuda	Kochi	Kerala	Naval Air Station
INHS Sanjivani	Kochi	Kerala	Naval Hospital
INS Venduruthy	Kochi	Kerala	Logistics and Administrative support
INS Dronacharya	Kochi	Kerala	Naval Weapons Training
NAE Kochi	Kochi	Kerala	Naval Air Enclave at Cochin International Airport
INS Zamorin	Ezhimala	Kerala	Logistics and Maintenance support to Indian Naval Academy
INHS Navjivani	Ezhimala	Kerala	Naval Hospital at Indian Naval Academy
INS Chilka	Khordha	Odisha	Naval Training (Sailors)
INHS Nivarini	Khordha	Odisha	Naval Hospital
INS Mandovi	Panaji	Goa	Provost and Physical Training School
INS Hamla	Mumbai	Maharashtra	Combined Operations Training
INS Shivaji	Lonavala	Maharashtra	Technical Training
INHS Kasturi	Lonavala	Maharashtra	Naval Hospital
INS Valsura	Jamnagar	Gujarat	Electric Equipment Training
INS Rajali	Arakkonam	Tamil Nadu	Naval Air Station
INS Agrani	Coimbatore	Tamil Nadu	Leadership Training
Eastern Naval Command
INS Satavahana	Visakhapatnam	Andhra Pradesh	Submarine Warfare Training
INS Vishwakarma	Visakhapatnam	Andhra Pradesh	Shipwright School
INS Circars	Visakhapatnam	Andhra Pradesh	Logistics and Administrative support
INS Dega	Visakhapatnam	Andhra Pradesh	Naval Air Station
INS Virbahu	Visakhapatnam	Andhra Pradesh	Submarine base
INHS Kalyani	Visakhapatnam	Andhra Pradesh	Naval Hospital
INS Kalinga	Visakhapatnam	Andhra Pradesh	Naval Missile Depot
INS Eksila	Visakhapatnam	Andhra Pradesh	Marine gas turbine maintenance
INS Karna	Visakhapatnam	Andhra Pradesh	MARCOS Garrison
INS Varsha**	Visakhapatnam	Andhra Pradesh	Submarine base
INS Badangi**	Vizianagaram	Andhra Pradesh	Naval Air Station
INS Pudur**	Pudur	Telangana	Submarine VLF facility (Note: 1,174 hectares of forest lands under transferred in January 2024. Project completion by 2027. Will include 3×500m tall towers and a township housing 700 officers and personnel. Foundation stone laying on 15 October 2024 by Defence Minister Rajnath Singh.)
INS Adyar	Chennai	Tamil Nadu	Logistics and Maintenance support
NAE Chennai	Chennai	Tamil Nadu	Naval Air Enclave at Chennai International Airport
INS Parundu	Uchipuli	Tamil Nadu	Naval Air Station
INS Kattabomman	Tirunelveli	Tamil Nadu	Submarine VLF/ELF facility
INS Thoothukudi	Thoothukudi	Tamil Nadu	Logistics support; FOB to be set up
INS Netaji Subhas	Kolkata	West Bengal	Logistics and administrative support
INS Haldia**	Haldia	West Bengal	Logistics and administrative support
NavDet Paradip	Paradip	Odisha	FOB to be set up
NAE Bhubaneswar**	Bhubaneswar	Odisha	Naval Air Enclave at Bhubaneswar Airport
Andaman & Nicobar Command (Note: This comes under a separate command part of the Indian Armed Forces and is not under the direct control by the Indian Navy.)
INS Kardip	Kamorta	Andaman & Nicobar Islands	Forward Operating Base
INS Jarawa	Sri Vijaya Puram	Andaman & Nicobar Islands	Logistics and Administrative support
INS Utkrosh	Sri Vijaya Puram	Andaman & Nicobar Islands	Joint Naval and Air Force Base
INHS Dhanvantri	Sri Vijaya Puram	Andaman & Nicobar Islands	Naval Hospital
INS Baaz	Campbell Bay	Andaman & Nicobar Islands	Naval Air Station
INS Campbell Bay**	Campbell Bay	Andaman & Nicobar Islands	Forward Operating Base
INS Kohassa	Diglipur	Andaman & Nicobar Islands	Naval Air Station

Note:

** = Under construction

== See also ==
Indian navy related lists

- Aircraft of the Indian Navy
- List of active Indian Navy ships
- List of Indian naval aircraft
- List of submarines of the Indian Navy
- List of historical ships of the Indian Navy

Indian military related

- India-China Border Roads
- Indian military satellites
- List of Indian Air Force stations
- India's overseas military bases
- Indian Nuclear Command Authority
