= INS Netaji Subhas =

Indian naval base

INS Netaji Subhas
- Kolkata, West Bengal in India
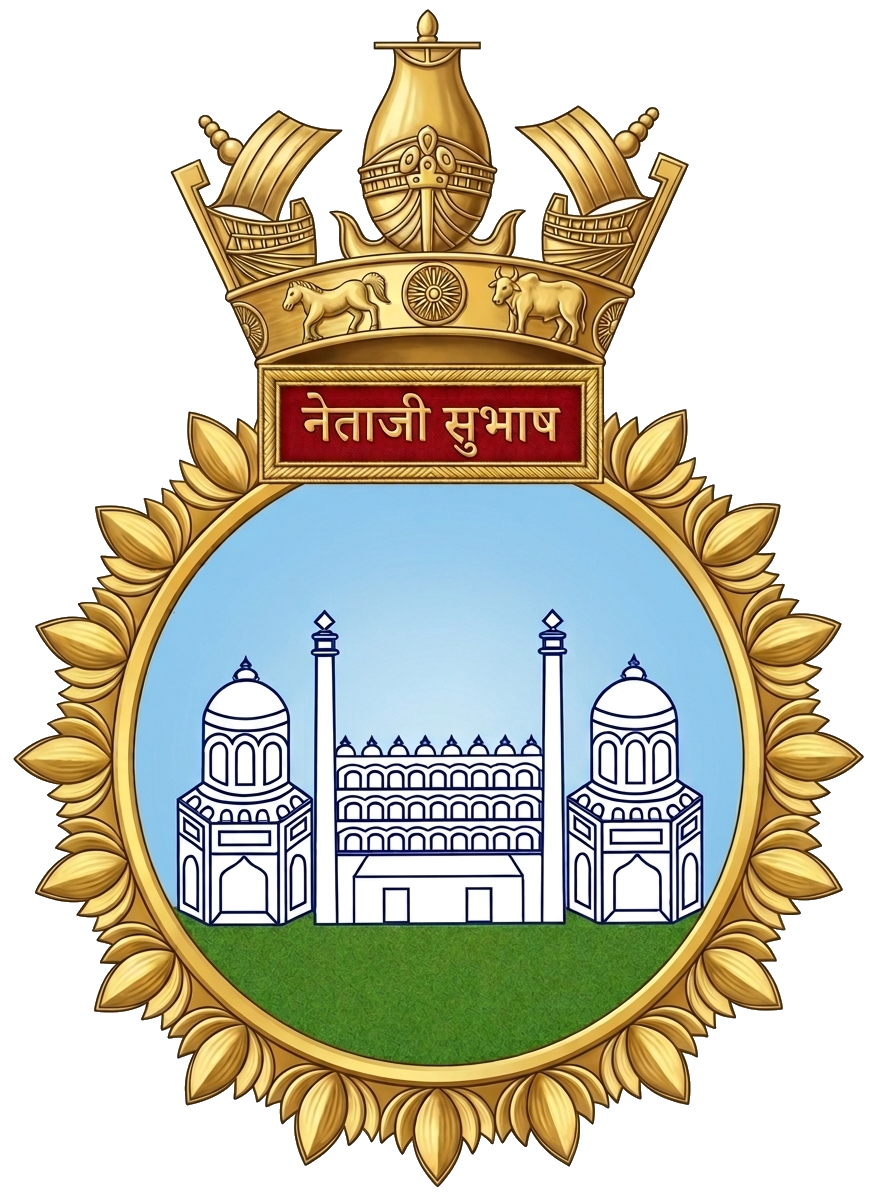

Site information
- Type: Naval shore establishment
- Owner: Ministry of Defence
- Operator: Indian Navy
- Condition: Operational

Location
- Coordinates: 22.5521°N 88.3279°E

Site history
- In use: 1943 - present

Garrison information
- Current commander: Commodore Ajay Yadav

INS Netaji Subhas is a base depot ship in the Indian Navy. It is a shore establishment that provides administrative and logistics support to visiting Indian Navy ships, submarines, aircraft and other allied and foreign navy units at the Kolkata and Haldia ports. The base also provides support to its allied units like WOT (Kolkata), Naval Armament Inspectorate, Electrical and Machinery Trials Unit, Machinery Trials Unit, NLC, Services Selection Board (DH) and 5N DET and all Sainik Schools and NCC Units in State of West Bengal and North East States.

The base has six motorboats including two fast interceptor craft (FICs) operating directly under NOIC (West Bengal).

The crest of the unit depicts the Red Fort against a blue background in the top half and light green foreground in the bottom half. The unit also undertakes annual ex-servicemen meets where matters concerning ESM Welfare such as pension, healthcare, career counselling and common grievances are discussed.

== History ==
The naval base in the port city of Calcutta (now Kolkata) began with a small HMI Naval Office under a naval control of the shipping officer, in the then Marine House. The port of Calcutta was strategic important during World War II so the Allied naval presence in India increased to safeguard and strengthen its maritime assets in East India and augment the logistic support capability to Allied units and later Indian naval ships operating in the Bay of Bengal.

Thus from Marine House in 1940 to a more conspicuous HMIS Hoogly in 1943 to INS Hoogly port Independence grew the Naval footprint in the East. INS Hoogly was renamed INS Netaji Subhas on 5 July 1974 and the base gradually changed in line with the growing importance of the eastern seaboard to trade, security and diplomacy.

The Indian Navy is evaluating the deployment of Unmanned Aerial Vehicles (UAVs) in West Bengal to enhance maritime surveillance. Operational plans include a potential UAV squadron based at Kolkata's Behala Flying Club. While the Sundarbans' dense canopy poses technical challenges for aerial monitoring, the initiative aims to secure coastal borders against smuggling and bolster regional maritime domain awareness.

== See also ==
- Lascar War Memorial
- List of Indian Navy bases
- List of active Indian Navy ships
