= Karwar Airport =

Airport in Karnataka, India

Coordinates: 14.64781°N 74.32970°E

- IATA: None; ICAO: None

Summary
- Airport type: Public
- Operator: Airports Authority of India
- Serves: Uttara Kannada District, Karnataka
- Location: Alageri ( near Ankola), (Karnataka)

Map

Runways
Direction	Length		Surface
Direction	ft	m	Surface
13/31			Asphalt

Karwar Airport is a proposed airport and will be built by the Indian Navy at Alageri village near Ankola in Karnataka. The naval air station is expected to start functioning in 2025.

The Airports Authority of India (AAI) will operate a civil enclave at the naval air base which is part of the Navy's Rs 10,000 crore Phase 2 of Project Seabird.

== Naval air station ==
The Naval Air Station Karwar is being built on 1,328 acres primarily to cater to the Navy's large, ship-based helicopter units and Dornier 228 aircraft that will be stationed at the base. The Indian Navy's Boeing P-8I, advanced maritime surveillance aircraft is also expected to be stationed at Ankola.

The commissioning of a naval air station at Karwar will decongest INS Hansa at the nearby Dabolim Airport which is a front line Air Station that is highly congested with both operational and training flying. The resulting restrictions on civil commercial air traffic has met with opposition from civilian quarters since Goa is a popular tourist destination in India

In early 2007, there were reports of a concerted move by the Navy, the AAI, and the state of Karnataka to extend the runway planned at the naval base near Ankola to 2,500 metres (8,200 ft) to accommodate Airbus A320s and to acquire 75 extra hectares for this purpose. However, there have been no corresponding plans announced so far to relocate flight training from Dabolim to this airport or any other more convenient place.

== Civilian Use ==
Navy had initially planned to construct a 2,000-metre long runway for the naval air station. The Karnataka State Government approached the Ministry of Defence (MoD) to use the air station for civil operations. The MoD approved of the proposal and asked the State government to facilitate the extension of the runway by another 1000 metres to a total of 3000 meters.

The AAI had carried out an inspection of the site at the request of the Karnataka Government in 2006. It had given suggestions regarding orientation, location and extension of the proposed runway to 2,500 metres and also of its land requirements of an additional 75 hectares. Accordingly, in 2019, the district administration began acquiring 40 acres for extension of the runway and for the terminal building. The State Government has requested the Central Government to bear the cost of acquisition of this additional land, estimated to be Rs. 20 crores.

== See also ==
- INS Kadamba
- List of airports in Karnataka
