= INS Varsha =

Naval base under construction in Andhra Pradesh, India

- Rambilli, Andhra Pradesh
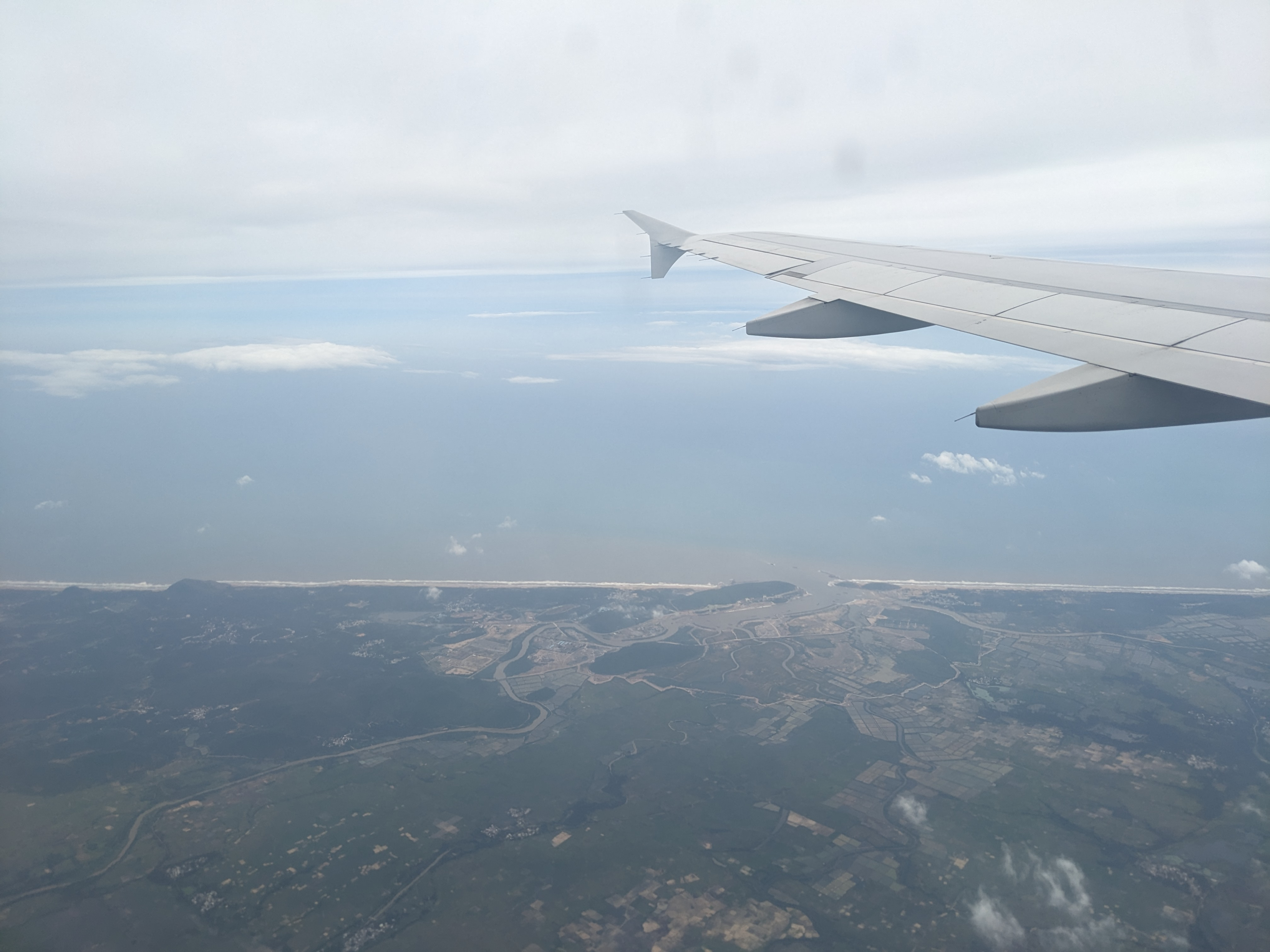
- Sarada River joining the Bay of Bengal near Rambilli

Site information
- Type: Naval station
- Controlled by: Indian Navy
- Condition: Under construction

Location
- Coordinates: 17°25′49.7″N 82°52′38.2″E

Garrison information
- Occupants: Eastern Naval Command

INS Varsha, an Indian Navy's naval base in Andhra Pradesh state under Project Varsha to house India's nuclear submarine fleet, is being developed and expanded in phases at Rambilli 50 km (31 mi) south of Visakhapatnam, the headquarters of the navy's Eastern Naval Command. While the crew belongs to the Indian Navy, operational control resides with the Strategic Forces Command in Delhi. Arihant-class nuclear submarines will be based at INS Varsha. The naval bases lies on the confluence of Sarada and Varaha rivers.

It is designated as Naval Operational Alternative Base (NOAB).

== History ==
As early as in 2005, Project Varsha base was planned to be located within a radius of approximately 200 km (120 mi) from Visakhapatnam in order to de-congest the Visakhapatnam Port, which is being used by both the Navy and the civilian Ministry of Shipping. The Navy's dockyards at Vizag was facing shortage of berthing space due to the rapid expansion of the Eastern fleet, which grew from 15 major warships in 2006 to 46 in 2012, and is still expanding. Initially, Gangavaram, 10 km (6.2 mi) south of Visakhapatnam, was considered for the new base, but Rambilli was chosen as the final location to construct the naval base.

== Features ==
INS Varsha will have a large near-by facility of the Bhabha Atomic Research Centre (BARC), and will include modern nuclear engineering support facilities and extensive crew accommodation. It is designed to support the fleet of over 12 nuclear ballistic missile submarine and nuclear attack submarines to be built for the Indian Navy within a network of underground pens in the Eastern Ghats. This would avoid detection of the submarines during satellite and aerial surveillance as well as protect them from enemy air attacks. With the operationalisation of the base, submarines can be deployed into the waters of the Bay of Bengal stealthily without needing to surface. This is because of the natural depth of the region which would act like a "cloak".

While designed principally as a nuclear submarine support facility, the new base will also accommodate additional surface naval vessels after the ongoing construction of piers. Comparable to the top-secret Hainan nuclear submarine base of the Chinese PLA Navy, this east coast base expansion programme by the Indian Navy was started due to India's Look East policy and the Chinese naval expansion into the region.

== Construction ==
Project Varsha is being undertaken to enhance India's navy capabilities on the Eastern Coast of India. For the Western Coast of India, similar expansion are being undertaken under the Project Seabird for the INS Kadamba at Karwar. As of December 2017, the first phase was to be completed in 2022 at a cost of ₹30,000 crore (equivalent to ₹420 billion or US$4.4 billion in 2023).

Project Varsha Phase-I:

In 2011-12, the phase-I commenced with allocation of ₹160 crore (equivalent to ₹330 crore or US$35 million in 2023), including ₹58 crore (equivalent to ₹120 crore or US$13 million in 2023) for civil works and ₹100 crore (equivalent to ₹206 crore or US$22 million in 2023) for a VLF communication system, subsequently additional funding was progressively released to expand the naval base which was completed in 2025 and was set to be commissioned in 2026 on the eastern coast of India.

Project Varsha Phase-II:

In 2018, 670 hectares of forest land in Rambilli were allocated for building a strategic technical area and command center for the Indian Navy under phase-II, as well as 845 ha for BARC's Nuclear Marine and Submarine Missile R&D complex 20 km (12 mi) away,

== See also ==
- Andaman and Nicobar Command
  - INS Baaz, Indian base closest to Indonesia
- Eastern Command
  - INS Satavahana, at Visakhapatnam in Andhra Pradesh
- Western Command
  - INS Jatayu, at Minicoy in Lakshyadweep
  - INS Kadamba, at Karawar in Karnataka
  - INS Vajrabahu, at Mumbai in Maharashtra
