= INS Trata =

- Worli, Mumbai, Maharashtra

Site information
- Type: Naval Missile Battery Base
- Controlled by: Indian Navy

Location
- Coordinates: 19.015229°N 72.816664°E

Site history
- Built: 1964
- In use: 1964–present

Garrison information
- Occupants: Western Naval Command

INS Trata is a missile battery base of the Indian Navy at Mumbai, Maharashtra tasked with the coastal defense of Maharashtra and Gujarat.

== History ==
The word Trata in Sanskrit means 'The Protector'. The unit was commissioned on 12 December 1964 when the Indian Navy took over the coastal battery at Colaba point, from the army, which is presently INS Kunjali. The then Chief of Naval Staff, Vice Admiral BS Soman commissioned it as INS Trata. On 26 Aug 1988 the Navy's MMCB squadron was inducted. It was placed under the command of the Commanding Officer, INS Trata, when it shifted to Worli in August 1992.

== Objective ==
The role of INS Trata is to defend the Indian naval bases and shipping against enemy ship attacks. The Mobile Missile Coastal Battery (MMCB) Squadron is unique in the Indian Navy in the sense that it is an operational Missile Squadron that is intended to provide Missile Coverage & Coastal defense to the Coast of Gujarat and Maharashtra and is also a shore establishment.

== See also ==
Indian navy

- List of Indian Navy bases
- List of active Indian Navy ships

Integrated commands and units

- Armed Forces Special Operations Division
- Defence Cyber Agency
- Integrated Defence Staff
- Integrated Space Cell
- Indian Nuclear Command Authority
- Indian Armed Forces
- Special Forces of India

Other lists

- Strategic Forces Command
- List of Indian Air Force stations
- List of Indian Navy bases
- India's overseas military bases
