= INHS Patanjali =

Geography
- Location: India
- Coordinates: 14.776234°N 74.152597°E

Organisation
- Type: Military hospital

Services
- Beds: 409

History
- Opened: 26 December 2006

Links
- Lists: Hospitals in India

INHS Patanjali
- Karwar, Karnataka
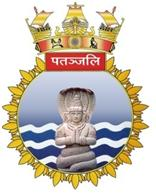
- Crest of INHS Patanjali

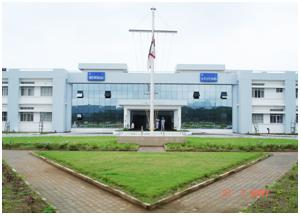
- Main hospital building

Site information
- Type: Naval Hospital
- Controlled by: Indian Navy

Site history
- Built: 2006
- In use: 2006–present

Garrison information
- Occupants: Western Naval Command

INHS Patanjali is the naval hospital of the Indian Navy at Karwar, Karnataka which was commissioned on 26 December 2006. INHS Patanjali is the second naval establishment commissioned at Karwar. It had an initial capacity of 141 beds which has been upgraded to 409 by 2026.

== Objective ==
INS Kadamba in Karwar is a premier base of the Indian Navy on the western seaboard. The hospital is responsible for the medical support of the ships based in Karwar and other establishments. In addition, it provides preventive and curative care to all the servicemen and families of the Navy, DSC, NCC, Coast Guard, ex-servicemen and their dependents. Emergency services are extended to civilians as and when required.

== See also ==
Indian navy

- List of Indian Navy bases
- List of active Indian Navy ships
- INS Kadamba, major naval base on the west coast
- INS Vajrakosh, missile and ammunition base at Karwar

Integrated commands and units

- Armed Forces Special Operations Division
- Defence Cyber Agency
- Integrated Defence Staff
- Integrated Space Cell
- Indian Nuclear Command Authority
- Indian Armed Forces
- Special Forces of India

Other lists

- Strategic Forces Command
- List of Indian Air Force stations
- List of Indian Navy bases
- India's overseas military bases
