= INS Tanaji =

Indian ship

INS Tanaji stands for the Indian Naval Ship Tanaji and it is a Base Depot ship of the Mankhurd Naval station. It was commissioned by the Chief of the Naval Staff Admiral Nirmal Verma on 10 July 2012 and it acts as a database, human resource unit and career management centre for sailors. INS Tanaji had played a crucial role in the advancements of the Mankhurd Naval Station. The Indian Navy continued its tradition of naming Indian Naval establishments after the great warriors by naming the ship after Tanaji Malusare. He was a general in the Maratha army of Shivaji and was also alternatively known as the Simha (lion) for Sinhagad's battle in the 1670.

An official of the Indian Navy stated, INS Tanaji will be providing administrative and logistics support and will be a base support ship for all the allied units of the Mankhurd station. INS Tanaji comes under Western Naval Command. It will also support the Bureau of sailors which take care of all the issues of the sailors.
