= Amadalli =

Coordinates: 14°46′N 74°13′E

- village
- Interactive map of Amadalli
- Country: India
- State: Karnataka
- District: Uttara Kannada
- Talukas: Karwar

Population (2001)
  - Total: 6,593

Languages
  - Official: Kannada
- Time zone: UTC+5:30 (IST)

Amadalli is a village in the southern state of Karnataka, India. It is located in the Karwar taluk of Uttara Kannada district in Karnataka.

== Demographics ==
As of 2001 India census, Amadalli had a population of 6593 with 3369 males and 3224 females.

== See also ==
- Uttara Kannada
- Districts of Karnataka
