= INS Vajrakosh =

- Karwar, Karnataka

Site information
- Type: Naval ammunition and missile storage facility
- Controlled by: Indian Navy

Site history
- Built: 2015
- In use: 2015–present

Garrison information
- Current commander: Captain Deepak Nair
- Occupants: Western Naval Command

INS Vajrakosh is a missile and ammunition base of the Indian Navy at Karwar, Karnataka and is the third naval establishment. It was commissioned on 9 September 2015 by the Defence Minister Mr. Manohar Parrikar.

== Objective ==
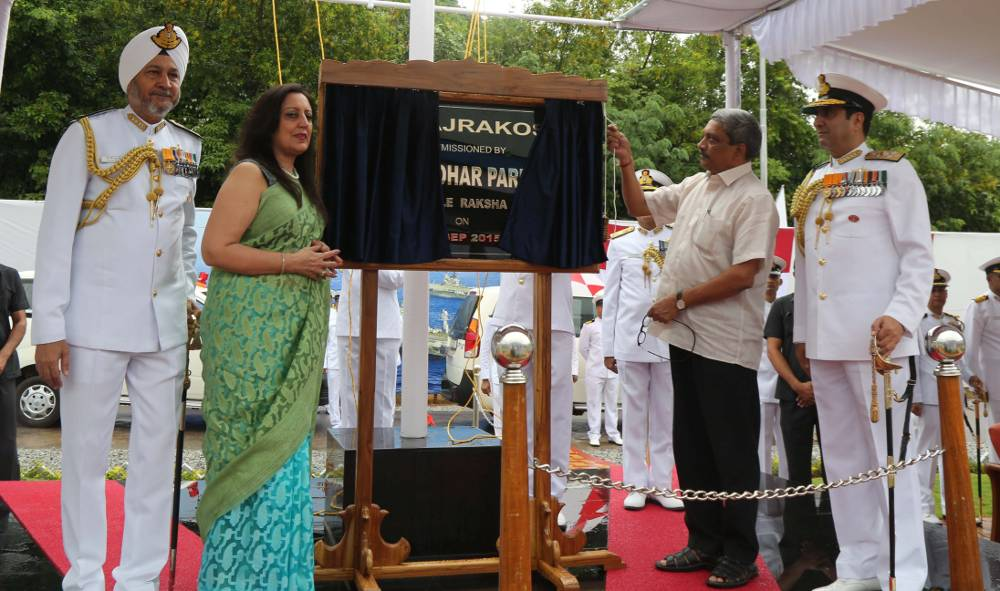
Defence Minister Manohar Parrikar with Admiral RK Dhowan during the commissioning of INS Vajrkosh

INS Vajrakosh serves as a special storage facility for specialized armaments, missiles, ammunition on the Western Sea Board. It is also reportedly able to equip warships and airplanes with ammunition and has an infrastructure providing specialized servicing facilities, for sophisticated missiles and ammunition.

The commissioning of INS Vajrakosh was believed to allow the Indian Navy to further bolster the offensive and defensive capabilities of its platforms.

== See also ==
Indian navy

- List of Indian Navy bases
- List of active Indian Navy ships
- INS Kadamba, a major naval base on the west coast

Integrated commands and units

- Armed Forces Special Operations Division
- Defence Cyber Agency
- Integrated Defence Staff
- Integrated Space Cell
- Indian Nuclear Command Authority
- Indian Armed Forces
- Special Forces of India

Other lists

- Strategic Forces Command
- List of Indian Air Force stations
- List of Indian Navy bases
- India's overseas military bases
