= Ajay D. Theophilus =

Indian admiral

Rear Admiral Ajay Daniel Theophilus VSM
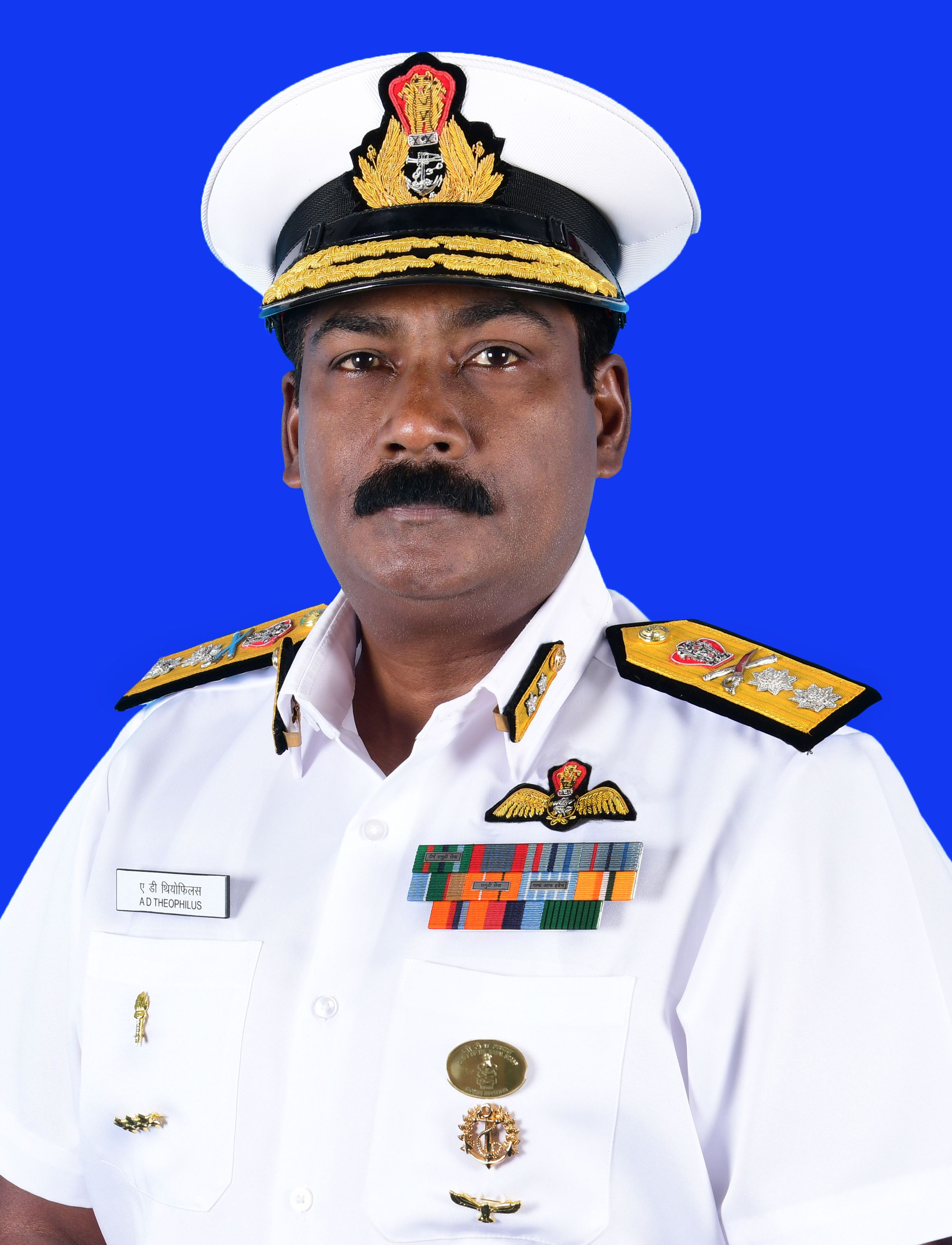
- Theophilus as Deputy Commandant INA
- Education: Indian Naval Academy
- Military career
- Allegiance: India
- Branch: Indian Navy
- Service years: 1991–present
- Rank: Rear Admiral
- Commands: Goa Naval Area; INS Hansa; INS Tarkash (F50); INS Talwar (F40); INAS 303; INS Trinkat (T61)
- Awards: Vishisht Seva Medal

Rear Admiral Ajay Daniel Theophilus, VSM is a serving flag officer of the Indian Navy. He currently serves as the Flag Officer Naval Aviation (FONA) and Flag Officer Commanding Goa Naval Area (FOGA). He previously served as the deputy commandant of the Indian Naval Academy (INA). He earlier served as the commanding officer of INS Hansa and was the commissioning commanding officer of the first Mikoyan MiG-29K naval air squadron INAS 303.

== Naval career ==
Theophilus joined the Indian Naval Academy on 28 August 1987 and was commissioned into the Indian Navy on 1 July 1991. He was selected to undergo the pilot's course in June 1992. He trained as a Naval aviator and qualified as a fighter pilot. He has over 3000 hours of flying experience and has flown the HAL HJT-16 Kiran, the HAL HPT-32 Deepak, the Mikoyan-Gurevich MiG-21, the British Aerospace Sea Harrier and the MiG-29K aircraft.

Theophilus completed the Flying Instructors Course in 2001 and has is a Qualified Flying Instructor (QFI) on Sea Harriers and MiG-29K. In 2004, India ordered the MiG-29K carrier-based fighter aircraft. Theophilus, as a commander, was selected to head the project. He was appointed officer-in-charge (OiC) Intensive Flying Trials Unit (IFTU) and trained in Russia. As OiC, he led the team for the trials and testing of the aircraft. On 11 May 2013, the naval air squadron INAS 303 (The Black Panthers) was commissioned in Goa. Theophilus was the commissioning commanding officer and was the first Indian Pilot to land MiG-29K on the aircraft carrier INS Vikramaditya (R33).

Theophilus commanded the lead ship of her-class of patrol vessels INS Trinkat (T61). In the rank of captain, he served as the captain (air) of Vikramaditya. He subsequently commanded the lead ship of her-class of frigates, INS Talwar (F40). He later commanded her sister ship INS Tarkash (F50).

In the rank of commodore, Theophilus headed the directorate of air warfare and flight safety (AWFS) at Naval Headquarters. On 1 August 2020, he took over as commanding officer (CO) of the Naval air station INS Hansa in Goa.

=== Flag rank ===
On 1 April 2022, Theophilus was promoted to flag rank and appointed deputy commandant (DepCom) and chief instructor of the Indian Naval Academy, Ezhimala. He took over from Rear Admiral A. N. Pramod. After a fourteen-month long stint as DepCom of INA, he was appointed Flag Officer Naval Aviation (FONA). During this tenure, he also dual-hats as the Flag Officer Goa Area (FOGA). He was awarded the Vishisht Seva Medal on 26 January 2026.

== Personal life ==
Theophilus married to Savitha Theophilus. The couple has two children - Abhijith and Millen.

== Awards and decorations ==
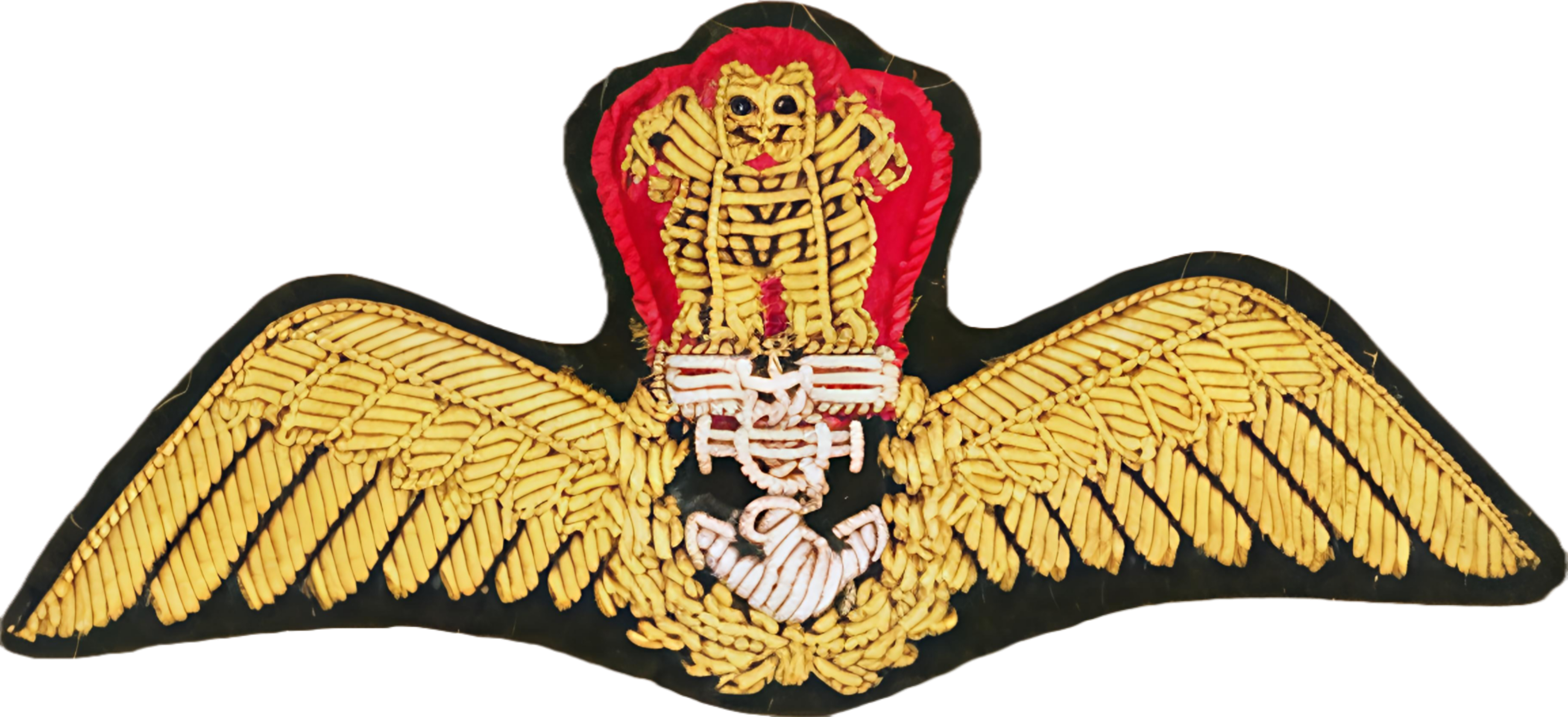

Pilot Badge
Vishisht Seva Medal	Samanya Seva Medal	Special Service Medal	Operation Vijay Star
Operation Vijay Medal	Operation Parakram Medal	Sainya Seva Medal	Videsh Seva Medal
75th Anniversary of Independence Medal	50th Anniversary of Independence Medal		30 Years Long Service Medal
	20 Years Long Service Medal	9 Years Long Service Medal	

Military offices
Preceded by Vikram Menon	Flag Officer Commanding Goa Naval Area & Flag Officer Naval Aviation; 2023 - present	Incumbent
Preceded by A. N. Pramod	Deputy Commandant Indian Naval Academy; 2022 - 2023	Succeeded by Prakash Gopalan
