= Vikram Menon =

Indian Navy admiral

Rear Admiral Vikram Menon VSM
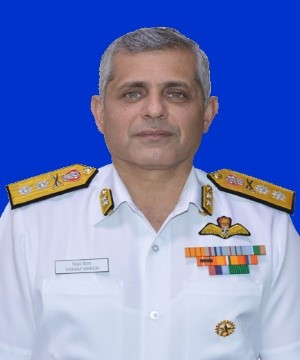
- Alma mater: Indian Naval Academy
- Military career
- Allegiance: India
- Branch: Indian Navy
- Service years: 1990 - present
- Rank: Rear Admiral
- Commands: Karnataka Naval Area; Goa Naval Area; INS Hansa; INS Shakti (A57); INAS 552; INS Sharda (P55); INS Tillanchang (T62)
- Awards: Vishisht Seva Medal

Rear Admiral Vikram Menon, VSM is a serving flag officer of the Indian Navy. He currently serves as the Flag Officer Commanding Karnataka Naval Area. His previous stints include Joint Secretary to the Government of India (Navy & Defence Staff) at the Department of Military Affairs in Ministry of Defence, Flag Officer Naval Aviation (FONA) and Flag Officer Commanding Goa Naval Area (FOGA), and Assistant Chief of the Naval Staff (Air) at Naval headquarters.

== Naval career ==
Menon graduated from the National Defence Academy and was commissioned into the Indian Navy on 1 January 1990. He trained as a Naval aviator. He qualified as a fighter pilot on the British Aerospace Sea Harrier. He has over 2000 hours of flying experience and became a Qualified Flying Instructor (QFI). He was a senior pilot in INAS 300, the longest serving combat unit of the Indian Navy. He has flown the Sea Harrier extensively from the aircraft carrier INS Viraat (R22)

Menon commanded the Trinkat-class patrol vessel INS Tillanchang (T62) and the Sukanya-class patrol vessel INS Sharda (P55). He also commanded the Naval Flight Test Squadron INAS 552. As a captain, he commanded the Deepak-class fleet tanker INS Shakti (A57). He was in command of INS Shakti during the International Fleet Review 2016 at Visakhapatnam. As part of the Eastern Fleet in 2015, INS Shakti, under his command, visited Thailand, Singapore, Indonesia, Cambodia and Australia as part of India's Act East policy.

He also served as the executive officer of the Rajput-class Guided-missile destroyer INS Ranvijay (D55). He subsequently attended the Higher Naval Command course at the Naval War College, Goa. Menon then served as the Director of Aircraft Acquisition at Naval Headquarters.

Promoted to the rank of commodore, Menon took over as commanding officer (CO) of the Naval air station INS Hansa in Goa. For his tenure as CO INS Hansa, he was awarded the Vishisht Seva Medal on 26 January 2018. He subsequently served as the Chief Staff Officer (Air) at Headquarters Naval Aviation to the then FONA Rear Admiral P. G. Pynumootil.

=== Flag rank ===
Menon was promoted to flag rank and appointed Assistant Chief of Naval Staff (Air) at Naval Headquarters. On 30 April 2022, he was appointed Flag Officer Naval Aviation (FONA). During this tenure, he also dual-hatted as the Flag Officer Commanding Goa Naval Area (FOGA). He took over as FOGA/FONA from Rear Admiral Philipose George Pynumootil. After about one-and-a-half years as FOGA/FONA, Menon was appointed Joint Secretary (Navy & Defence Staff) at the Department of Military Affairs. On 21 August, he moved to Karwar as the Flag Officer Commanding Karnataka Naval Area (FOK).

== Awards and decorations ==

Vishisht Seva Medal	Operation Vijay Star	Operation Vijay Medal	Operation Parakram Medal
Sainya Seva Medal	75th Anniversary of Independence Medal	50th Anniversary of Independence Medal	30 Years Long Service Medal
	20 Years Long Service Medal	9 Years Long Service Medal	

Military offices
Preceded by Philipose George Pynumootil	Flag Officer Commanding Goa Naval Area & Flag Officer Naval Aviation; 2022 - 2023	Succeeded by Ajay D. Theophilus
Preceded by Kapil Mohan Dhir	Joint Secretary (Navy & Defence Staff), Department of Military Affairs; 2023 - 2025	Succeeded by Kunal Singh Rajkumar
Preceded by K. M. Ramakrishnan	Flag Officer Commanding Karnataka Naval Area; 2025 - Present	Incumbent
