= Puneet Kumar Bahl =

Indian Navy admiral

Vice Admiral Puneet K Bahl AVSM, VSM
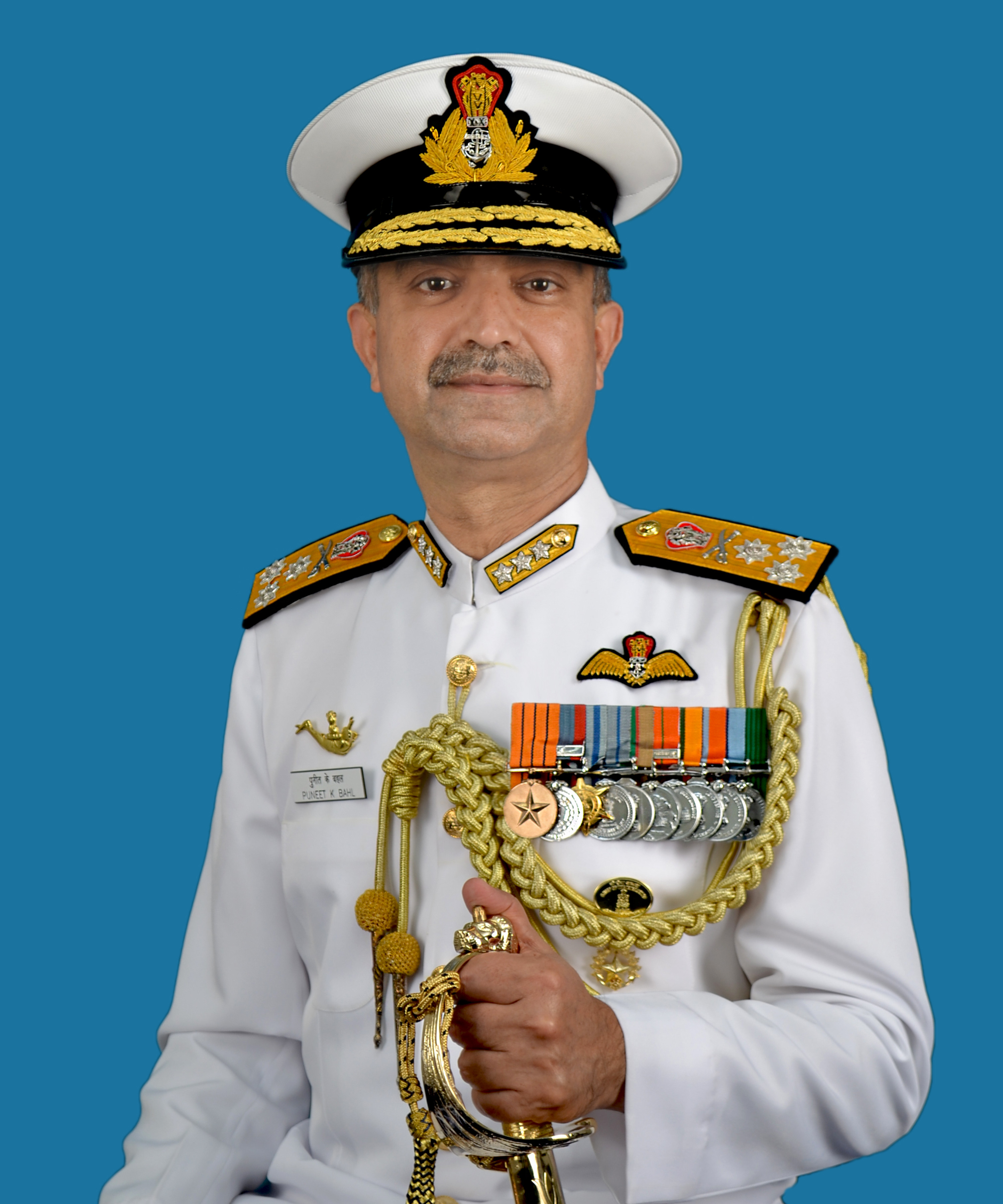
- Military career
- Allegiance: India
- Branch: Indian Navy
- Service years: July 1984–December 2023
- Rank: Vice Admiral
- Commands: Indian Naval Academy; Project Seabird; Maharashtra Area; Goa Area; INS Rajali; INS Betwa (F39); INS Sujata (P56)
- Awards: Ati Vishisht Seva Medal; Vishisht Seva Medal

Vice Admiral Puneet Kumar Bahl, AVSM, VSM is a former officer in the Indian Navy. He last served as the Commandant of the Indian Naval Academy. He previously served as the Director General Project Seabird, Flag Officer Commanding Maharashtra Naval Area (FOMA) in Mumbai and as the Flag Officer Commanding Goa Naval Area (FOGA) and Flag Officer Naval Aviation (FONA).

== Early life and education ==
Bahl graduated from the National Defence Academy, Pune. He later attended the Defence Services Staff College (DSSC), Wellington where he was awarded the Lengtaine Medal, and the Naval higher command course at the College of Naval Warfare, Mumbai.

== Naval career ==
Bahl was commissioned into the Indian Navy on 1 July 1984. He trained as a Naval aviator and is a maritime reconnaissance pilot, having flown six different types of aircraft. He also qualified as a ship's diver. As a pilot, he served at the naval air stations INS Garuda and INS Rajali. He also served on the Indian Air Force station AFS Yelahanka and with the CGAS 700 squadron of the Indian Coast Guard. He also participated in flying operations in Operation Tasha and Operation Vijay.

Bahl has commanded the Brahmaputra-class guided missile frigate INS Betwa (F39) and the Sukanya-class patrol vessel INS Sujata (P56) and served on board the aircraft carrier INS Vikrant, the guided missile frigate INS Godavari (F20) and INS Porbandar. He has served as Directing staff at DSSC Wellington and subsequently as the Joint Director Naval Air Staff (Aviation Plans) at Naval headquarters.

As a Captain, he served as the Defence Attaché (DA) in Japan and Republic of Korea at the Embassy of India at Tokyo from 2007 to 2010. As the DA, he coordinated and facilitated a Joint Declaration on Security Cooperation between India and Japan. Promoted to the rank of commodore, Bahl commanded the premier strategic airbase INS Rajali. He oversaw the induction and operationalisation of the Boeing P-8I for which the base was awarded with the unit citation by the Chief of the Naval Staff (India).

=== Flag rank ===
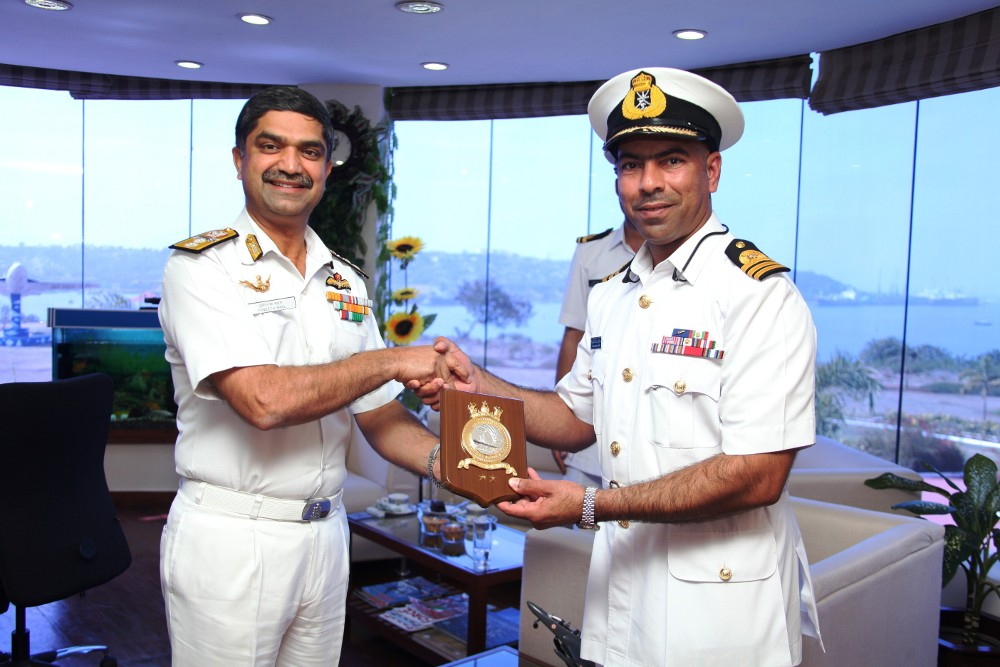
RAdm Bahl as FOGA/FONA with the CO of a visiting Royal Navy of Oman ship.

In January 2015, Bahl was promoted to the rank of rear admiral and appointed Assistant Chief of the Integrated Defence Staff, WSOI (ACIDS WSOI) at the Integrated Defence Staff (IDS) headquarters. After a short stint as ACIDS, in October that year, he took over as the Flag Officer Commanding Goa Naval Area (FOGA) and dual-hatted as the Flag Officer Naval Aviation (FONA). He served as FOGA&FONA for two-and-a-half years, after which he moved to Mumbai as the Flag Officer Commanding Maharashtra Naval Area (FOMA), succeeding Rear Admiral Sanjay Mahindru in February 2018.

In 2019, he was appointed Chief Staff Officer (Training) of the Southern Naval Command in Kochi. He subsequently served as the Chief Instructor (Navy) at the Defence Services Staff College (DSSC), Wellington. On 1 January 2021, he was promoted to the rank of vice admiral and appointed Director General Project Seabird.

== Personal life ==
Bahl is married to Anjali Bahl. The couple have two sons, Dhruv and Robin.

== Awards and decorations ==
In 2005, he was awarded the Chief of Naval Staff commendation card. For distinguished service, he was awarded the Vishisht Seva Medal in 2015 and the Ati Vishisht Seva Medal in 2020.

Ati Vishisht Seva Medal	Vishisht Seva Medal	Special Service Medal	Operation Vijay Star
Operation Vijay Medal	Operation Parakram Medal	Sainya Seva Medal	75th Independence Anniversary Medal
50th Anniversary of Independence Medal	30 Years Long Service Medal	20 Years Long Service Medal	9 Years Long Service Medal

== See also ==
- Project Seabird

Military offices
Preceded by Ravneet Singh	Flag Officer Commanding Goa Naval Area & Flag Officer Naval Aviation; 2015 – 2018	Succeeded by Philipose George Pynumootil
Preceded by Sanjay Mahindru	Flag Officer Commanding Maharashtra Naval Area; 2018 – 2019	Succeeded by Rajesh Pendharkar
Preceded by Ravneet Singh	Director General Project Seabird; January 2021 – December 2021	Succeeded by Tarun Sobti
Preceded by M. A. Hampiholi	Commandant of Indian Naval Academy; December 2021 – 31 December 2023	Succeeded by Vineet McCarty
