= Ravneet Singh (vice admiral) =

Indian Navy admiral

Vice Admiral Ravneet Singh PVSM, AVSM, NM
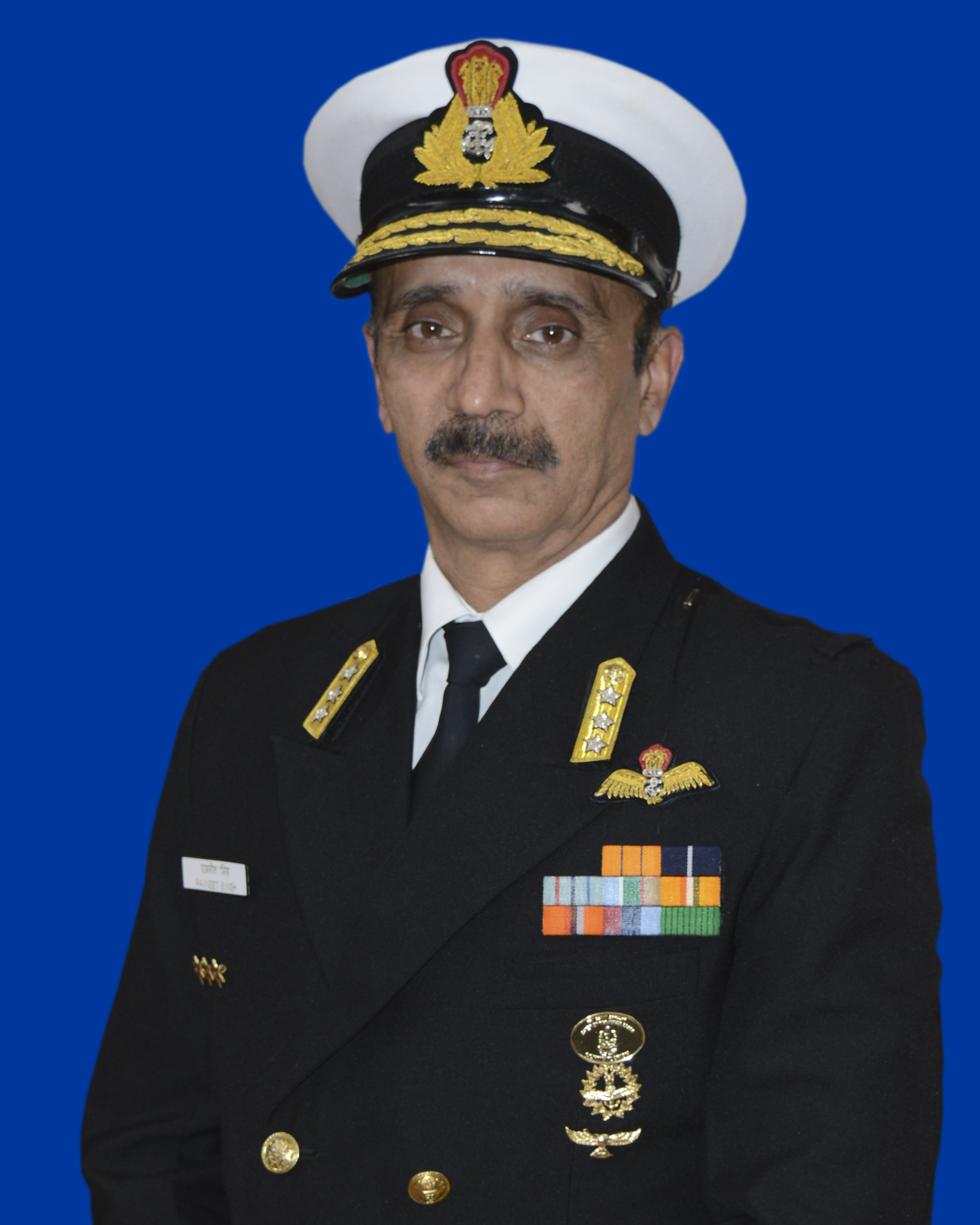
- Military career
- Allegiance: India
- Branch: Indian Navy
- Service years: 1 July 1983 - 31 March 2022
- Rank: Vice Admiral
- Commands: Deputy Chief of the Naval Staff; Western Fleet; INS Hansa; INAS 300; INAS 551; INS Ranvir (D54); INS Ranvijay (D55); INS Himgiri (F34)
- Awards: Param Vishisht Seva Medal; Ati Vishisht Seva Medal; Nao Sena Medal

Vice Admiral Ravneet Singh, PVSM, AVSM, NM is a former flag officer in the Indian Navy. He last served as the Deputy Chief of the Naval Staff. He assumed office from Vice Admiral Murlidhar Sadashiv Pawar on 1 June 2021 following his retirement. Previously, he served as the Chief of Personnel (COP) and as the Director General Project Seabird. He has also served as the Flag Officer Commanding Western Fleet from October 2015 to October 2016.

== Early life and education ==
Singh was born in Jalandhar, Punjab, India. He graduated from the National Defence Academy, Pune.

== Naval career ==
Singh was commissioned into the Indian Navy on 1 July 1983. Trained as a Naval aviator, he completed the Flying Instructors course at the Flying Instructors School in Tambaram Air Force Station, the staff course at the Defence Services Staff College in Wellington and the Harrier Conversion Course at RAF Wittering in United Kingdom. He has also attended the Project Management Programme at Indian Institute of Management Ahmedabad.

Singh has commanded the Nilgiri-class frigate INS Himgiri (F34) and the Rajput-class Guided missile destroyers INS Ranvir (D54) and INS Ranvijay (D55). Since he is a naval aviator, Singh has also commanded the Naval air squadrons INAS 300 and INAS 551. He has also commanded the premier Naval Air Base INS Hansa. Singh has also served as the executive officer of the Durg-class corvette INS Vijaydurg (K71) and the Delhi-class Guided missile destroyer INS Delhi (D61).

Singh is a fighter pilot and a Qualified Flying Instructor with a Master Green Instrument rating. He has over 2500 flying hours on 10 different types of aircraft. As a commander, when serving as a pilot on board INS Viraat (R22), he was awarded the Nao Sena Medal for gallantry. He has also served as the Indian Defence Advisor in Kenya, Tanzania and Seychelles.

=== Flag rank ===
On promotion to Flag Rank, Singh took over as the Assistant Controller Carrier Project (ACCP) at Naval HQ. He served as the Assistant Controller of Warship Production and Acquisition (ACWP&A) when the Aircraft Carrier INS Vikramaditya was inducted and commissioned. Singh then dual-hatted as the Flag Officer Commanding Goa Naval Area (FOGA) and Flag Officer Naval Aviation (FONA).

Singh assumed the office of the Flag Officer Commanding Western Fleet on 12 October 2015, from Vice Admiral R. Hari Kumar. For his command of the Western Fleet, he was awarded the Ati Vishisht Seva Medal on 26 January 2017. Singh then served as the Chief of Staff of the Western Naval Command and as the Director General Project Seabird. On 2 December 2019, Singh took over as the Chief of Personnel, a Principal Staff Officer (PSO) appointment at Naval HQ and served till 31 May 2021. He is succeeded by Vice Admiral Dinesh K Tripathi .

He took over as Deputy Chief of Naval Staff on 1 June 2021.

== Awards and decorations ==

Param Vishisht Seva Medal	Ati Vishisht Seva Medal	Nau Sena Medal	Operation Vijay Medal
Operation Parakram Medal	50th Anniversary of Independence Medal		30 Years Long Service Medal
	20 Years Long Service Medal	9 Years Long Service Medal	

== See also ==
- Flag Officer Commanding Western Fleet
- Western Fleet

== Bibliography ==
- Singh, Anup (2018), Blue Waters Ahoy!: The Indian Navy 2001-2010, HarperCollins Publishers India, ISBN 978-9353025526

Military offices
Preceded by Murlidhar Sadashiv Pawar	Deputy Chief of Naval Staff; 1 June 2021 – 31 March 2022	Succeeded by Sanjay Mahindru
Preceded by R. Hari Kumar	Chief of Personnel; 2 December 2019 – 31 May 2021	Succeeded by Dinesh K Tripathi
Preceded by R. Hari Kumar	Flag Officer Commanding Western Fleet; 2015 - 2016	Succeeded by R. B. Pandit
Preceded by Balvinder Singh Parhar	Flag Officer Commanding Goa Naval Area & Flag Officer Naval Aviation; 2015 - 2015	Succeeded by Puneet Kumar Bahl
