= Commandant of Indian Naval Academy =

Head of the Indian Naval Academy

Commandant of the Indian Naval Academy
- Flag of the Commandant (Vice Admiral's flag)

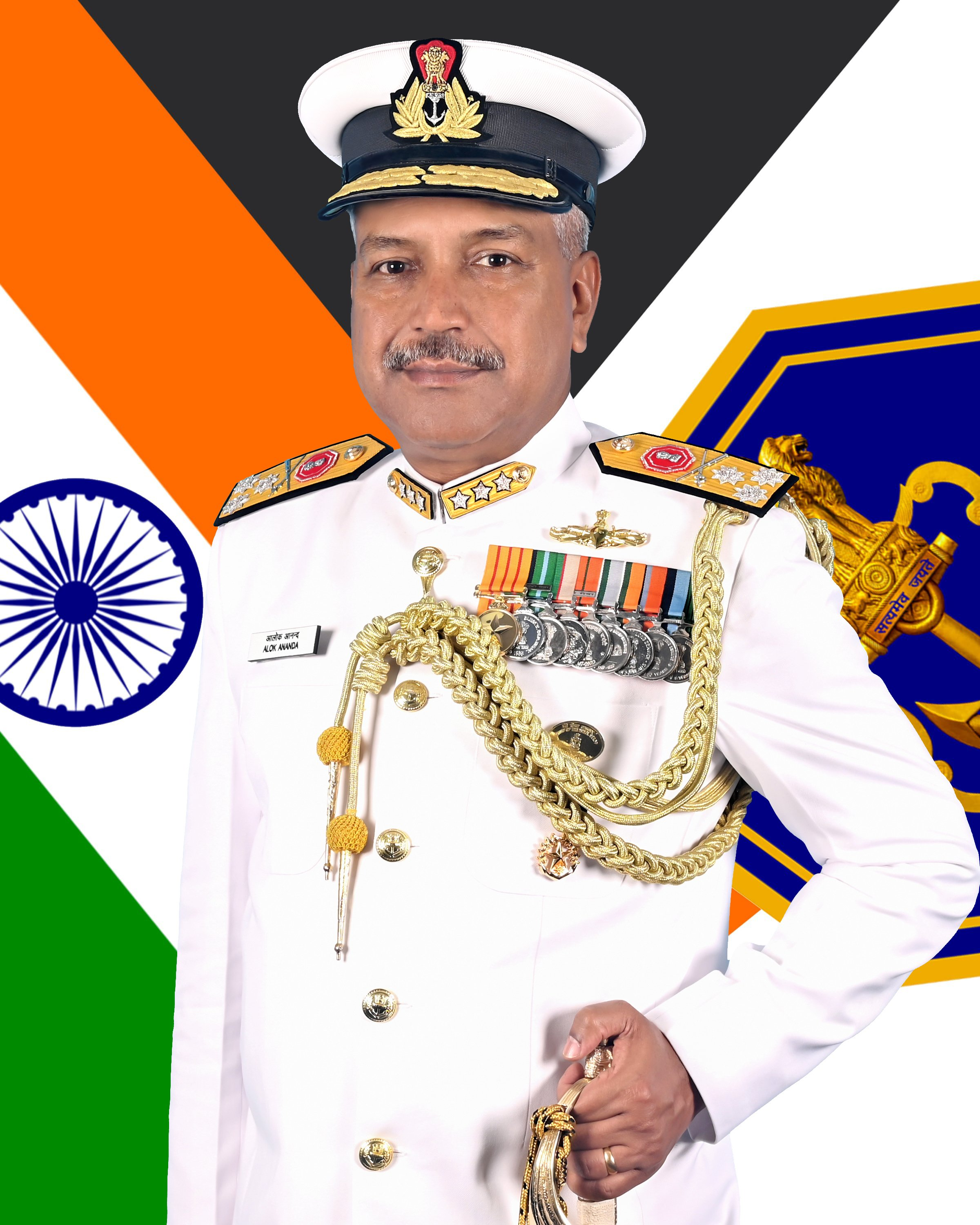
- Incumbent; Vice Admiral Alok Ananda YSM since 1 August 2026
- Reports to: Flag Officer Commanding-in-Chief Southern Naval Command
- Seat: Ezhimala, Kerala, India
- Website: www.ina.gov.in

The Commandant of the Indian Naval Academy is the head and in-charge of all the functioning of the Indian Naval Academy. The commandant of the academy is a three-star rank officer holding the rank of vice admiral. He is supported by the deputy commandant, a two-star appointment and the heads of the Academic Wing (rear admiral principal), Training Wing (commodore rank officer) and the Admin wing (commodore rank officer). The current Commandant is Vice Admiral Vice Admiral Alok Ananda who took over in August 2026.

== History ==
The Naval Academy (NAVAC) was set up in Cochin in 1969 as a temporary institution, to train officers for the Navy. The first Officer-in-charge (OIC) was Commander Laxminarayan Ramdas. The title of the head of the institution changed to commandant in 1980. The academy moved to Goa in 1986 under Commandants Captain M.S. Bedi and Captain O.P. Bansal.

In 2008, the academy moved to Ezhimala in Kerala and was re-christened the Indian Naval Academy (INA). Rear Admiral M. P. Muralidharan took over as the first commandant of INA.

== List of Commandants ==
S.No	Name	Appointment Date	Left Office	Notes
1	Captain D. Mohindra NM VSM	September 1980	March 1982	
2	Captain Madhvendra Singh	March 1982	July 1983	Later served as the Chief of the Naval Staff
3	Captain M. V. Karnik	August 1983	April 1986	
4	Captain M. S. Bedi	April 1986	July 1986	
5	Captain O. P. Bansal VSM	July 1986	June 1987	
6	Captain K. Mohan Rao VSM	July 1987	July 1989	Later Director General Project Seabird
7	Captain N. P. Mehta	July 1989	August 1990	
8	Captain K. P. Mathew	August 1990	December 1991	
9	Captain Jagjit Singh Bedi	December 1991	June 1993	Later Flag Officer Commanding-in-Chief Western Naval Command.
10	Commodore Nirmal Kumar Verma	July 1993	September 1994	Later Chief of the Naval Staff.
11	Commodore N. Venugopal VSM	September 1994	December 1997	
12	Commodore R. F. Contractor	December 1997	April 1999	Later Director General of the Indian Coast Guard.
10	Captain S. P. S. Cheema NM	April 1999	June 2001	Later served as Flag Officer Commanding Western Fleet, Chief of the Integrated Defence Staff, Commander-in Chief Strategic Forces Command, Flag Officer Commanding-in-Chief Southern Naval Command, and Flag Officer Commanding-in-Chief Western Naval Command
13	Captain K. S. Aiyappa	June 2001	June 2004	
14	Commodore N. N. Rao	June 2004	June 2007	
15	Captain M. A. Hampiholi	June 2007	January 2008	Later served as Flag officer Commanding Western Fleet.
Commandant INA, Ezhimala
16	Vice Admiral M. P. Muralidharan	January 2008 (Note: Promoted to the rank of vice-admiral on 18 February 2009.)	September 2009	First Commandant of the Indian Naval Academy at the Ezhimala campus. Later served as Director General Indian Coast Guard (DGICG).
17	Vice Admiral Anurag Thapliyal	September 2009 (Note: Promoted to the rank of vice-admiral on 1 October 2009.)	January 2012	Later served as Director General Indian Coast Guard (DGICG)
18	Vice Admiral Pradeep Chauhan	February 2012	November 2013	
19	Vice Admiral Ajit Kumar P AVSM VSM	December 2013	October 2016	Later served as Vice Chief of the Naval Staff and Flag Officer Commanding-in-Chief Western Naval Command.
20	Vice Admiral SV Bhokare YSM NM	October 2016	February 2018	Later served as Inspector General Nuclear Safety.
21	Vice Admiral R. B. Pandit AVSM	February 2018	June 2019	Later served as Commander-in-Chief,Strategic Forces Command.
22	Vice Admiral Dinesh K Tripathi AVSM NM	June 2019	July 2020	Current Chief of the Naval Staff.
23	Vice Admiral M. A. Hampiholi AVSM NM	July 2020	29 November 2021	Later served as Flag Officer Commanding-in-Chief Southern Naval Command
24	Vice Admiral Puneet Kumar Bahl AVSM VSM	1 December 2021	31 December 2023	
25	Vice Admiral Vineet McCarty AVSM	15 January 2024	29 August 2024	Current Commander-in-Chief, Andaman and Nicobar Command.
26	Vice Admiral C. R. Praveen Nair NM	29 August 2024	31 July 2025	Current Controller of Personnel Services.
27	Vice Admiral Manish Chadha AVSM VSM	1 August 2025	31 July 2026	
28	Vice Admiral Alok Ananda YSM	1 August 2026	Present	

== Deputy Commandants ==
The list of Deputy Commandants and Chief Instructors of the INA:

S.No	Name	Appointment Date	Left Office	Notes
1	Rear Admiral Kapil Gupta VSM	1 November 2008	18 April 2011	First Deputy Commandant of INA.
2	Rear Admiral L. V. Sarat Babu NM	7 June 2011	28 August 2012	Later Chairman and Managing Director, Hindustan Shipyard Limited.
3	Rear Admiral G. V. Ravindran	29 August 2012	30 June 2014	
4	Rear Admiral M. D. Suresh NM	14 July 2014	29 January 2018	Later Chief of Staff, Southern Naval Command.
5	Rear Admiral Puneet Chadha VSM	27 March 2018	3 March 2019	Later Additional Director General National Cadet Corps.
6	Rear Admiral Tarun Sobti VSM	4 March 2019	11 January 2021	Later Deputy Chief of the Naval Staff.
7	Rear Admiral A. N. Pramod	11 January 2021	1 April 2022	Current Deputy Chief of the Naval Staff.
8	Rear Admiral Ajay D. Theophilus	1 April 2022	31 July 2023	Current Flag Officer Commanding Goa Naval Area and Flag Officer Naval Aviation.
9	Rear Admiral Prakash Gopalan	1 December 2023	31 January 2026	Current Chief of Staff, Southern Naval Command.
10	Rear Admiral Happy Mohan VSM	1 December 2023	31 January 2026	Current DepCom.

== See also ==
- Commandant of the Indian Military Academy
- Commandant of the Air Force Academy
- Commandant of the National Defence Academy
- Commandant of the Officers Training Academy, Chennai

== Bibliography ==
- Singh, Anup (2018), Blue Waters Ahoy!, The Indian Navy 2001-2010, HarperCollins Publishers India, ISBN 978-93-5302-552-6
