= Philipose George Pynumootil =

Indian Navy admiral

Rear Admiral Philipose G Pynumootil AVSM, NM
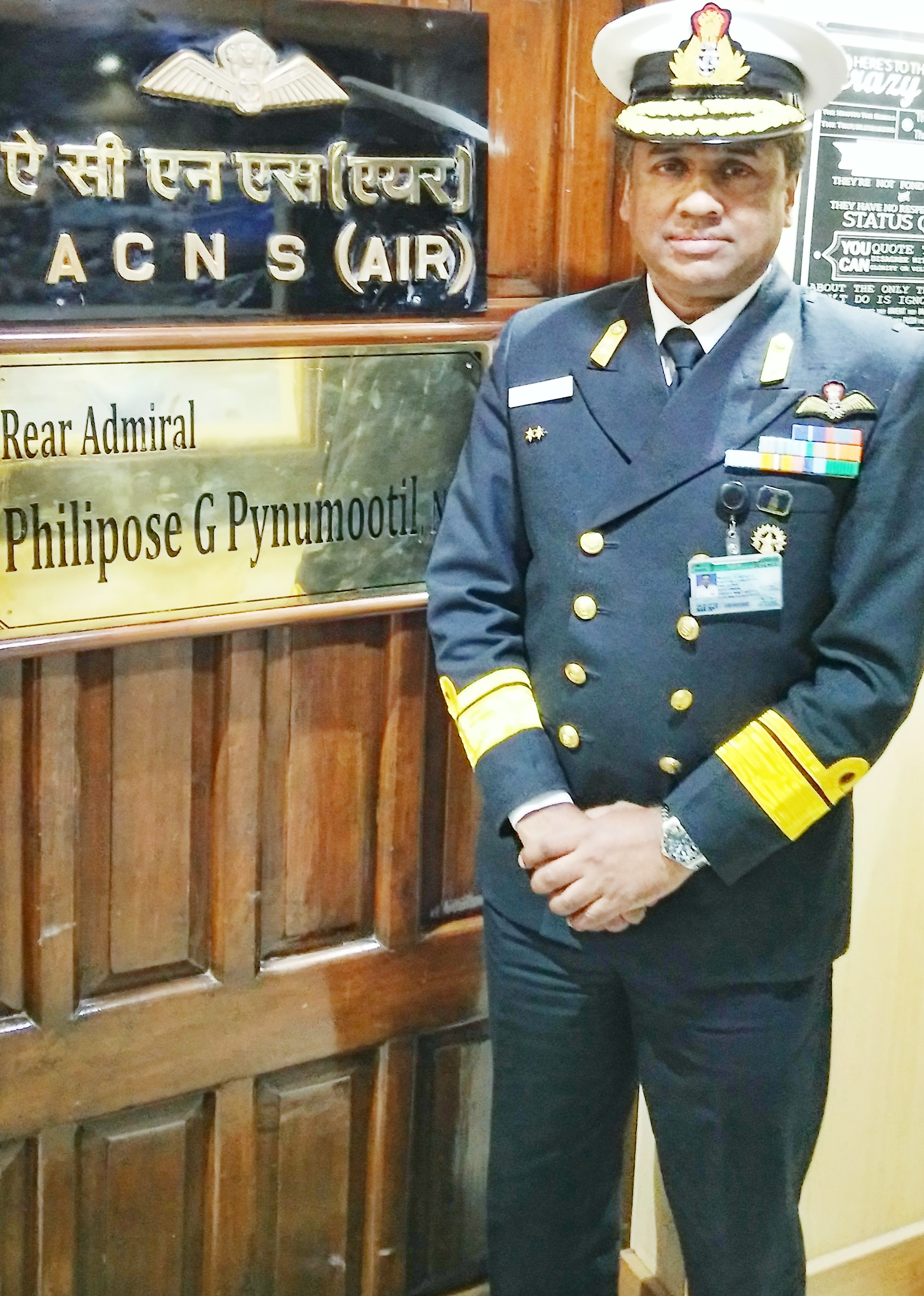
- RAdm Pynumootil as ACNS (Air)
- Military career
- Allegiance: India
- Branch: Indian Navy
- Service years: 1986 - 2022
- Rank: Rear Admiral
- Commands: Goa Naval Area; INS Shikra; INAS 330; INS Brahmaputra (1994); INS Kirpan (P44); INS Nashak (K83)
- Awards: Ati Vishisht Seva Medal; Nao Sena Medal

Rear Admiral Philipose George Pynumootil, AVSM, NM is a former flag officer of the Indian Navy. He last served as the Flag Officer Naval Aviation and Flag Officer Commanding Goa Naval Area. He previously served as the Assistant Chief of Naval Staff (Air) at Naval headquarters. He superannuated on 30 April 2022.

== Early life and education ==
Pynumootil was born to Pynumootil Simon George, a fighter pilot in the Indian Air Force, and Glory George. George rose to the rank of Air Marshal and last served as Inspector General (Inspection & Safety) at Air headquarters. Philipose's elder brother Simon joined the Indian Navy and trained as a naval aviator. Simon died tragically when the Britten-Norman BN-2 Islander aircraft he was piloting crashed, in May 1985. His sister Sara is married to Brigadier Chacko Ipe, a former Indian Army Armoured Corps officer from 64th Cavalry.

Pynumootil attended the Lawrence School, Lovedale where he completed his schooling. He then joined the 67th course of the National Defence Academy, Pune.

== Naval career ==
Pynumootil was commissioned into the Indian Navy on 1 January 1986. He opted for Naval aviation, following his brother and father who were both pilots. He trained at the Air Force Academy, Dindigul and the Helicopter Training School. He qualified as a helicopter pilot on the Aérospatiale Alouette III (HAL Chetak) and the Westland Sea King. He flew extensively during Operation Pawan in Sri Lanka in 1990. In 1993, he served in Somalia, flying helicopters during Operation Restore Hope.

In 1998, Pynumootil, took command of the Veer-class corvette INS Nashak (K83). After a year-long stint, he was selected to attend the Defence Services Staff College in Wellington. After completing his staff course, he served on the Marine Commando flight as the senior pilot. He subsequently served as a senior pilot in the carrier-borne anti-submarine warfare (ASW) Sea King squadron INAS 330. In 2002, he took over as the commanding officer of the squadron.

Pynumootil was then appointed the executive officer of the lead ship of her class of guided missile destroyers INS Delhi (D61) in January 2004. After serving as EXO of Delhi for a little over a year, he took command of the Khukri-class corvette INS Kirpan (P44). He was in command of the Kirpan during the Review of the Fleet by the President of India Dr. A. P. J. Abdul Kalam in 2005. In 2006, Pynumootil attended the Higher Air Command course at the College of Air Warfare, Secunderabad.

After the higher air command course, Pynumootil was appointed the commissioning commanding officer of the naval air station INS Shikra. Located in Colaba, Mumbai, INS Shikra is a heliport and was commissioned on 22 January 2009. Later that year, he commanded the lead ship of her class of guided missile frigates INS Brahmaputra (1994). For his command of the Brahmaputra, he was awarded the Nau Sena Medal. He subsequently attended the Royal College of Defence Studies, London where he obtained a Master of Arts degree in International Relations from King's College London. His Indian course mates at the RCDS were Brigadier Ranbir Singh and Air Commodore Diptendu Choudhury. After the course, he returned to India and in October 2011, he moved to naval headquarters as the Principal Director of Aircraft Acquisition. He had a long tenure of three-and-a-half years, serving till May 2015.

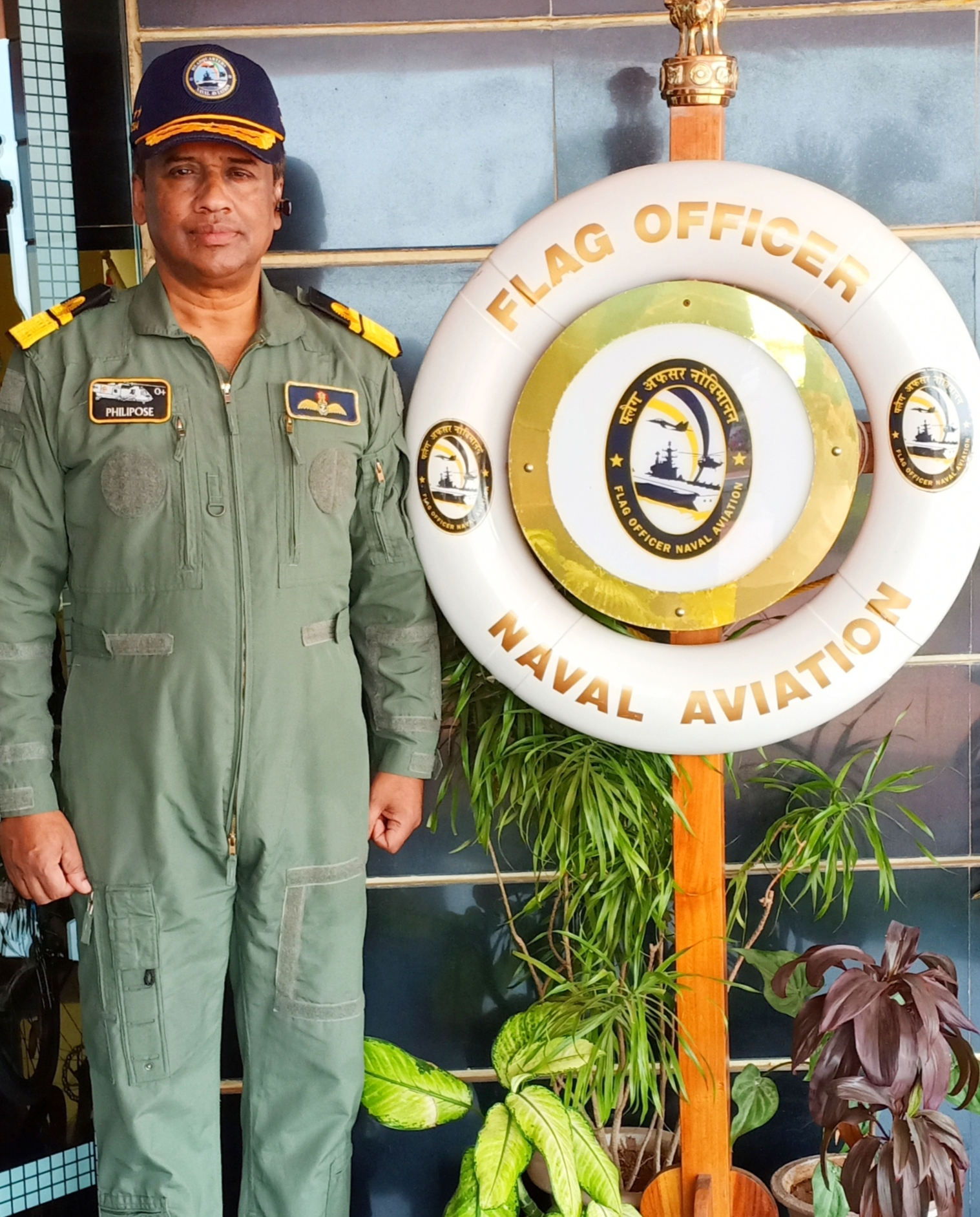
RAdm Pynumootil as FONA

=== Flag rank ===
In June 2015, Pynumootil was promoted to the rank of rear admiral and took over as the Assistant Chief of Naval Staff (Air) (ACNS Air) at Naval HQ. In February 2018, he was appointed Flag Officer Naval Aviation (FONA). During this tenure, he also dual-hatted as the Flag Officer Commanding Goa Naval Area (FOGA). For his tenure as FONA and FOGA, he was awarded the Ati Vishisht Seva Medal on 26 January 2021. In August that year, Pynumootil conducted the first landing on the INS Vikrant in a Sea King 42B helicopter. He is the only pilot to have landed on all four Indian aircraft carriers - INS Vikrant, INS Viraat (R22), INS Vikramaditya (R33) and the IAC 1 INS Vikrant.

In the ten years that he spent as Principal Director aircraft acquisition, ACNS (Air), and FONA, 12 Boeing P-8 Poseidon, 45 Mikoyan MiG-29K, 17 BAE Systems Hawk, 16 HAL Dhruv, 12 Dornier 228 and 12 Pipistrel Virus were inducted into the Indian Navy.

Pynumootil retired on 30 April 2022 after 36 years of service.

== Personal life ==
Pynumootil is married to Priya Ittycheria, daughter of late Colonel Jacob Ittycheria, of the 64th Cavalry, and Susan Ittycheria. Priya has worked with the Concern India Foundation and was on the faculty of the Naval Maritime Academy, Mumbai, where she conducted the PSSR course for seafarers. The couple's daughter, Rahel, is a journalist with the business publication The Ken in Bangalore.

== Awards and decorations ==

Ati Vishisht Seva Medal	Nau Sena Medal	Special Service Medal	Operation Vijay Medal
Operation Parakram Medal	Sainya Seva Medal	Videsh Seva Medal	50th Anniversary of Independence Medal
30 Years Long Service Medal	20 Years Long Service Medal		9 Years Long Service Medal

Military offices
Preceded by D. M. Sudan	Assistant Chief of Naval Staff (Air); 2015 - 2018	Succeeded by Mukul Asthana
Preceded by Puneet Kumar Bahl	Flag Officer Commanding Goa Naval Area & Flag Officer Naval Aviation; 2018 - 2022	Succeeded by Vikram Menon
