= Flag Officer Commanding Goa Naval Area =

Area Commander of the Indian Navy

Flag Officer Commanding Goa Naval Area (FOGA)
- Flag of the FOGA (Rear Admiral's flag)

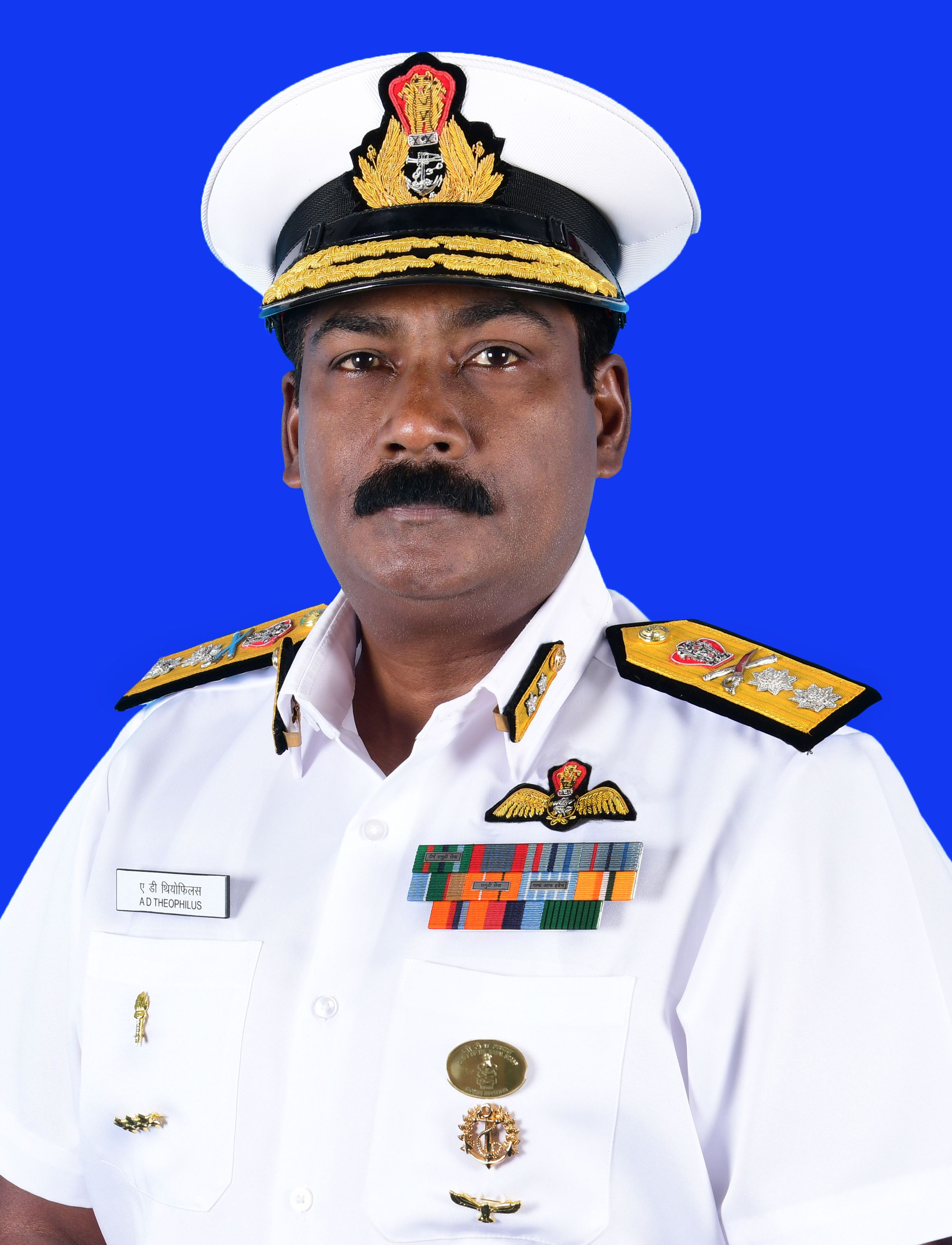
- Incumbent; Rear Admiral Ajay D. Theophilus VSM since 1 August 2023
- Indian Navy
- Abbreviation: FOGA
- Reports to: Flag Officer Commanding-in-Chief Western Naval Command
- Seat: Goa
- First holder: Rear Admiral R. H. Tahiliani

Flag Officer Commanding Goa Naval Area (FOGA) is a senior appointment in the Indian Navy. One of the five Area Commanders of the Indian Navy, the FOGA is a two star admiral holding the rank of Rear Admiral. The FOGA is responsible for the operations and administration of all units and establishments in the state of Goa. Since 1987, the FOGA dual-hats as the Flag Officer Naval Aviation. The current FOGA is Rear Admiral Ajay D. Theophilus, who assumed office on 1 August 2023.

== History ==
After the Liberation of Goa and its absorption into the Indian Union in 1961, a naval detachment was established at Vasco in January 1962. This detachment grew and was commissioned as INS Gomantak in March 1964. In June that year, the naval air station INS Hansa moved from Sulur to Dabolim. With the development of establishments and naval infrastructure, the post of Naval Officer-in-Charge Goa (NOIC Goa) was created.

In 1977, the appointment of NOIC Goa was upgraded to Rear Admiral and re-designated Flag Officer Commanding Goa Naval Area (FOGA). Rear Admiral R. H. Tahiliani, AVSM took over as the first FOGA on 30 December 1977.

In 1986, it was proposed to rationalise the command and control of the naval air arm by creating the appointment of Flag Officer Naval Aviation (FONA). The FONA would be responsible for all aviation training and maintenance activity and act as the class authority for all aviation matters. The operational deployment of all aviation units would continue to be controlled and directed by the respective commanders-in-chief. With Goa being the home of the naval air arm, FOGA was the natural choice to also serve as the FONA. In March 1986, the serving FOGA Rear Admiral R. V. Singh assumed the appointment of FONA as well. Since then the FOGA has dual-hatted as the FONA.

== Organisation ==
The FOGA is assisted by the NOIC (Goa) and the Chief Staff Officer at Headquarters Goa Naval Area (HQGNA), both one-star appointments. The FOMA reports to the Flag Officer Commanding-in-Chief Western Naval Command. The establishments under the FOGA include:

- Headquarters Goa Naval Area (HQGNA)
- The base depot ship INS Gomantak
- The naval air station INS Hansa
- The naval hospital INHS Jeevanti
- Sagar Prahari Bal, Goa

== List of Commanders ==
S.No.	Name	Assumed office	Left office	Notes
1	Rear Admiral R. H. Tahiliani AVSM	30 December 1977	28 February 1979	First FOGA. Later Chief of the Naval Staff.
2	Rear Admiral K. K. Nayyar AVSM	1 March 1979	4 January 1980	Later Vice Chief of the Naval Staff.
3	Rear Admiral Subir Paul VrC	12 October 1980	31 July 1983	
4	Rear Admiral S. C. Chopra NM	31 July 1983	8 February 1985	Flag Officer Commanding-in-Chief Eastern Naval Command.
5	Rear Admiral H. Johnson VSM	9 February 1985	4 March 1986	Later Vice Chief of the Naval Staff .
6	Rear Admiral R. V. Singh AVSM	4 March 1986	31 December 1987	
7	Rear Admiral S. Ramsagar VrC, NM	11 June 1988	27 December 1989	
8	Rear Admiral P. A. Debrass AVSM, NM	27 December 1989	30 November 1993	
9	Rear Admiral Vinod Pasricha NM	27 December 1993	4 January 1995	Later Flag Officer Commanding-in-Chief Eastern Naval Command and Flag Officer Commanding-in-Chief Western Naval Command.
10	Rear Admiral Sureesh Mehta AVSM	4 January 1995	9 May 1997	Later Chief of the Naval Staff.
11	Rear Admiral K. V. Bharathan VSM	10 May 1997	6 November 1998	Later Vice Chief of the Naval Staff.
12	Rear Admiral Yashwant Prasad AVSM, NM	6 November 1998	16 July 1999	Later Flag Officer Commanding-in-Chief Southern Naval Command and Vice Chief of the Naval Staff.
13	Rear Admiral K. Mohanan	16 July 1999	28 September 2001	
14	Rear Admiral S. K. Damle NM, VSM	28 September 2001	16 April 2004	Later Flag Officer Commanding-in-Chief Southern Naval Command.
15	Rear Admiral Shekhar Sinha NM &bar	16 April 2004	23 February 2006	Later Flag Officer Commanding-in-Chief Western Naval Command
16	Rear Admiral S. M. Vadgaokar NM	23 February 2006	28 January 2009	
17	Rear Admiral Sudhir Pillai NM	29 January 2009	27 May 2012	
18	Rear Admiral Balvinder Singh Parhar NM	28 May 2012	26 March 2015	
19	Rear Admiral Ravneet Singh NM	27 March 2015	5 October 2015	Later Deputy Chief of the Naval Staff.
20	Rear Admiral Puneet Kumar Bahl VSM	6 October 2015	9 February 2018	Later Commandant of Indian Naval Academy.
21	Rear Admiral Philipose George Pynumootil AVSM, NM	10 February 2018	30 April 2022	
22	Rear Admiral Vikram Menon VSM	1 May 2022	31 July 2023	Current Joint Secretary (Navy & Defence Staff) at the Department of Military Affairs.
23	Rear Admiral Ajay D. Theophilus	1 August 2023	Present	Current FOGA.

== See also ==
- INS Hansa

== Bibliography ==
- Singh, Satyindra (1992), Blueprint To Bluewater - The Indian Navy 1951-1965, Lancer Publishers, ISBN 81-7062-148-8
- Hiranandani, Gulab Mohanlal (2000), Transition To Triumph - Indian Navy 1965-1975, Lancer Publishers LLC, ISBN 1-897829-72-8
- Hiranandani, Gulab Mohanlal (2005), Transition to eminence : The Indian Navy 1976-1990, Lancer Publishers, ISBN 978-8170622666
- Hiranandani, Gulab Mohanlal (2009), Transition to Guardianship: The Indian Navy, 1991–2000, Lancer Publishers LLC, ISBN 978-1-935501-66-4
