= Shekhar Sinha =

Indian Navy officer

Vice Admiral Shekhar Sinha PVSM, AVSM, NM**, ADC
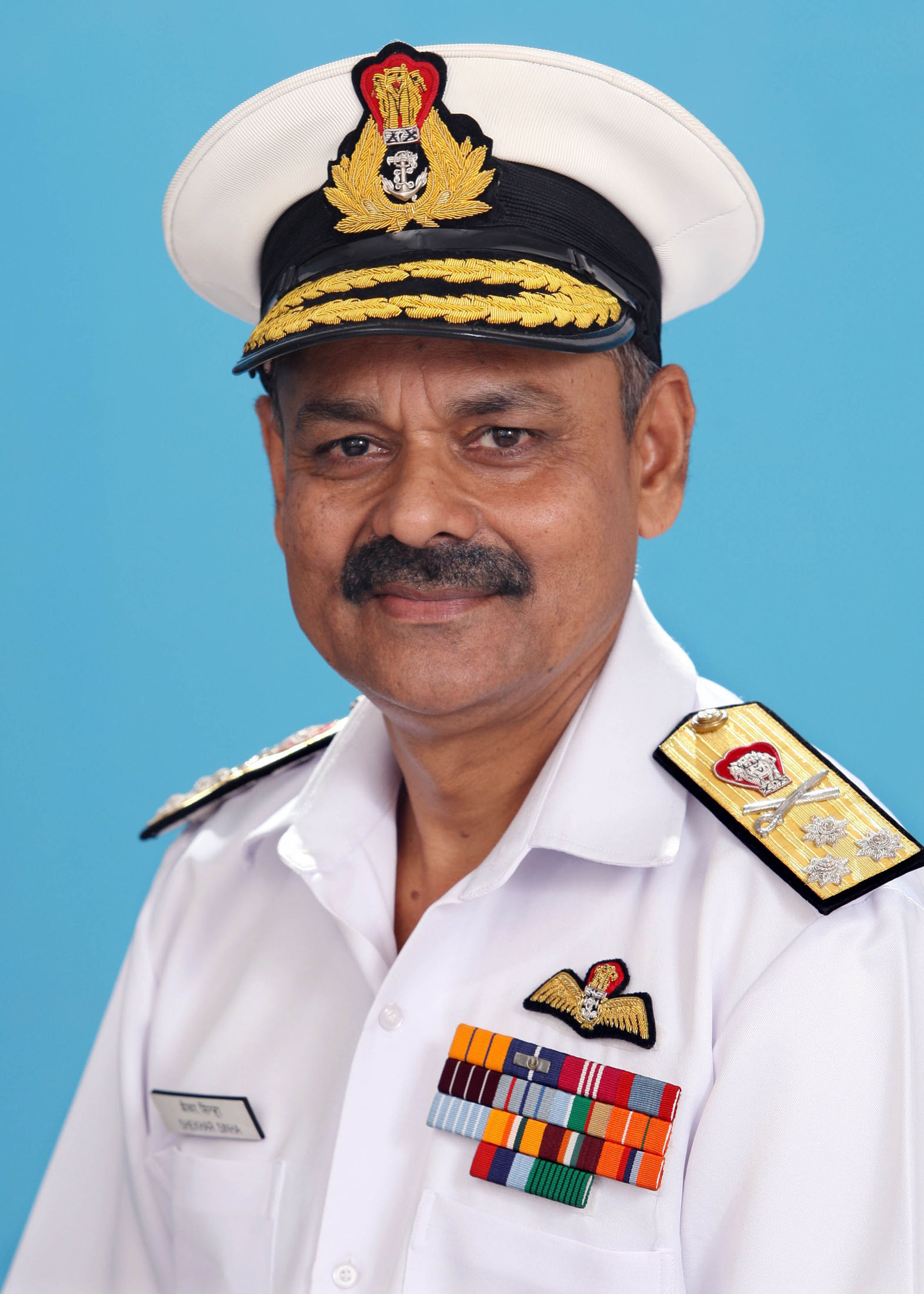
- Born: 10 August 1954 (age 72); Baluatoli, Purnia, Bihar
- Military career
- Allegiance: India
- Branch: Indian Navy
- Service years: 1974 - 2014
- Rank: Vice Admiral
- Commands: Western Naval Command; Western Fleet; INS Hansa; INS Saryu; INS Shakti; INS Delhi
- Awards: Param Vishisht Seva Medal; Ati Vishisht Seva Medal; Nao Sena Medal & Bar

Vice Admiral Shekhar Sinha, PVSM, AVSM, NM & Bar, ADC is a former Three star Admiral of the Indian Navy.

== Military career ==
Sinha joined the Navy in 1974 in the Executive Branch of the Indian Navy. He was a Naval aviator. A Fighter pilot, he flew the Sea Harrier.

He commanded two Sea Harrier Squadrons as well as Air Station Hansa. Adm Sinha has commanded the first Saryu-class patrol vessel INS Saryu, the Deepak-class fleet tanker INS Shakti and the guided-missile destroyer INS Delhi. He was appointed as the Fleet Operations Officer of the Western Fleet. His tenure was significant in which he was responsible for planning and execution, deployment of Western Fleet ships and submarines in Operations Parakram short of war post Parliament attack by Pakistan-based terrorists. In this operations Karachi harbour was virtually blocked and entire Makran coast was under constant surveillance for action.

=== Flag Rank ===
Ashore as a Flag Officer, he served as Flag Officer Commanding Goa Naval Area (FOGA) & Flag Officer Naval Aviation (FONA), Assistant Chief of Naval Staff (Air) as well as Controller of Personnel Services. As a Rear Admiral, Sinha served as the Flag Officer Commanding Western Fleet from 2007 to 2008. In a short stint in 2011, he served as the 6th Chief of Integrated Defence Staff. In 2012, Vice Adm Sinha was appointed Flag Officer Commanding-in-Chief Western Naval Command.

During his distinguished career, he has been conferred upon Param Vishisht Seva Medal(PVSM), Ati Vishisht Seva Medal(AVSM), Nao Sena Medal and Bar (NM&Bar) both Gallantry. He earned his second gallantry award during Op Pawan in Command of CGShip Rani Jindan for operations against terrorist organisations active in Palk Bay and surrounding seas.

== Supersession & Retirement ==
In 2014, the Government accepted the "voluntary retirement" of Vice Admiral Shekhar Sinha, who had put in his papers after Admiral Robin K. Dhowan, six months junior, superseded him to become the 22nd Chief of the Naval Staff. The Ministry of Defence's junking of the seniority principle has sparked some concern in military circles because successive governments have almost always stuck to it in appointing service chiefs. The chain of seniority in Indian military is considered virtually sacrosanct, with supersession being exceptionally rare.

The incumbent Chief of the Naval Staff, Admiral D K Joshi, resigned after a series of accidents involving ships of the Indian Navy. Adm Sinha was passed over as the Ministry of Defence felt that some of the blame for the mishaps should be attributed to him. After being passed over, Adm Sinha requested voluntary retirement.

== Decorations and medals ==

Param Vishisht Seva Medal	Ati Vishisht Seva Medal	Nausena Medal & bar	Paschimi Star
Special Service Medal	Sangram Medal	Operation Vijay Medal	Operation Parakram Medal
Sainya Seva Medal	Videsh Seva Medal	50th Independence Anniversary Medal	25th Independence Anniversary Medal
30 Years Long Service Medal	20 Years Long Service Medal		9 Years Long Service Medal

Military offices
Preceded by Devendra Kumar Joshi	Flag Officer Commanding-in-Chief Western Naval Command; 2012-2014	Succeeded by Anil Chopra
Preceded by Devendra Kumar Joshi	Chief Of Integrated Defence Staff; 2011-2011	Succeeded by S P S Cheema
Preceded by Anup Singh	Flag Officer Commanding Western Fleet; 14 March 2007 - 24 January 2008	Succeeded by Anil Chopra
Preceded by S. K. Damle	Flag Officer Commanding Goa Naval Area & Flag Officer Naval Aviation; 2004 - 2006	Succeeded by S. M. Vadgaokar
