= Prerna Deosthalee =

Indian Navy officer

Commander Prerna Deosthalee
- Military career
- Allegiance: India
- Branch: Indian Navy
- Service years: 2009–present
- Commands: INS Trinkat (T61)

Commander Prerna Deosthalee is a serving officer in the Indian Navy. She is the first woman officer to command an Indian Naval Warship. She is also the first female observer of the Navy on the Tupolev Tu-142 maritime reconnaissance aircraft.

== Early life and education ==
Deosthalee was born in Mumbai and attended the Convent of Jesus and Mary, Mumbai. She later attended the St. Xavier's College, Mumbai where she obtained a post-graduate degree in psychology. Her brother is also an officer of the Indian Navy.

== Naval career ==
Deosthalee was commissioned into the Indian Navy in 2009. She initially served on the P-8I maritime patrol aircraft as a naval air observer. She later became the first female Observer on the Tupolev Tu-142. She served as the First Lieutenant of the Kolkata-class destroyer INS Chennai (D65).

In December 2023, she became the first woman to be appointed commanding officer (CO) of an Indian Naval Warship. She was appointed as the CO of INS Trinkat (T61), the lead ship of her class of patrol vessels. This followed the Indian Navy's philosophy of 'all roles-all ranks' for female personnel. The Flag Officer Commanding Western Fleet Rear Admiral C. R. Praveen Nair handed over the appointment letter to her.

== Personal life ==
Deosthalee is married to a naval officer. The couple has a daughter.
