= Flag Officer Naval Aviation (India) =

Area Commander of the Indian Navy

Flag Officer Naval Aviation (FONA)
- Flag of the FONA (Rear Admiral's flag)

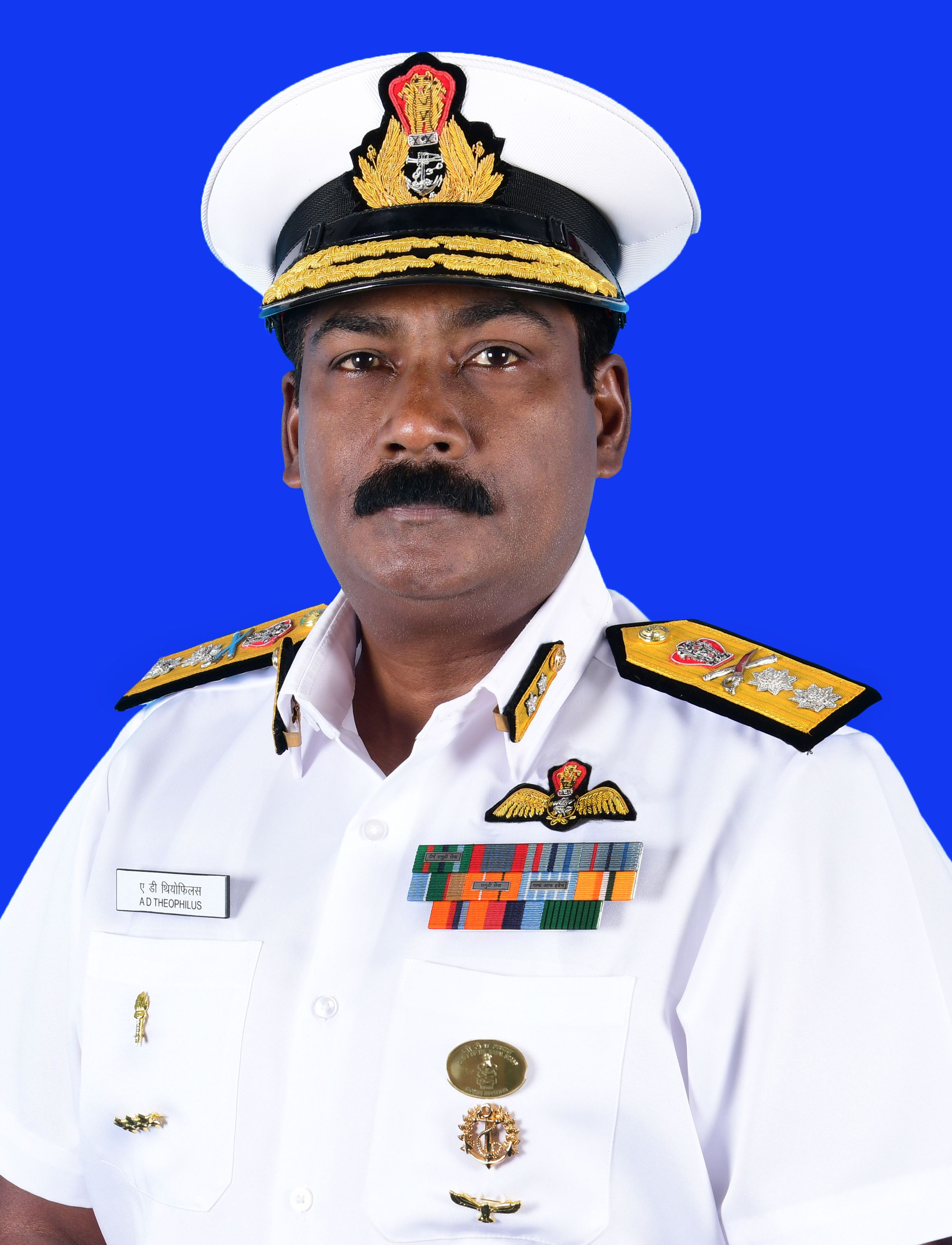
- Incumbent; Rear Admiral Ajay D. Theophilus since 1 August 2023
- Indian Navy
- Abbreviation: FONA
- Reports to: Deputy Chief of the Naval Staff
- Seat: Goa
- First holder: Rear Admiral R. V. Singh

Flag Officer Naval Aviation (FONA) is a senior appointment in the Indian Navy. A two star admiral holding the rank of Rear Admiral, the FONA is the class authority for all aviation matters an is responsible for all aviation training and maintenance activity. Since 1987, the billet has been dual-hatted by the Flag Officer Commanding Goa Naval Area (FOGA). The current FONA is Rear Admiral Ajay D. Theophilus, who assumed office on 1 August 2023.

== History ==
After the Liberation of Goa and its absorption into the Indian Union in 1961, a naval detachment was established at Vasco in January 1962. This detachment grew and was commissioned as INS Gomantak in March 1964. In June that year, the naval air station INS Hansa moved from Sulur to Dabolim. With the development of establishments and naval infrastructure, the post of Naval Officer-in-Charge Goa (NOIC Goa) was created.

In 1977, the appointment of NOIC Goa was upgraded to Rear Admiral and re-designated Flag Officer Commanding Goa Naval Area (FOGA). Rear Admiral R. H. Tahiliani, AVSM took over as the first FOGA on 30 December 1977.

In 1986, it was proposed to rationalise the command and control of the naval air arm by creating the appointment of Flag Officer Naval Aviation (FONA). The FONA would be responsible for all aviation training and maintenance activity and act as the class authority for all aviation matters. The operational deployment of all aviation units would continue to be controlled and directed by the respective commanders-in-chief. With Goa being the home of the naval air arm, FOGA was the natural choice to also serve as the FONA. In March 1986, the serving FOGA Rear Admiral R. V. Singh assumed the appointment of FONA as well. Since then the FOGA has dual-hatted as the FONA.

== List of Commanders ==
S.No.	Name	Assumed office	Left office	Notes
1	Rear Admiral R. V. Singh AVSM	4 March 1986	31 December 1987	
2	Rear Admiral S. Ramsagar VrC NM	11 June 1988	27 December 1989	
3	Rear Admiral P. A. Debrass AVSM NM	27 December 1989	30 November 1993	
4	Rear Admiral Vinod Pasricha NM	27 December 1993	4 January 1995	Later Flag Officer Commanding-in-Chief Eastern Naval Command and Flag Officer Commanding-in-Chief Western Naval Command.
5	Rear Admiral Sureesh Mehta AVSM	4 January 1995	9 May 1997	Later Chief of the Naval Staff.
6	Rear Admiral K. V. Bharathan VSM	10 May 1997	6 November 1998	Later Vice Chief of the Naval Staff.
7	Rear Admiral Yashwant Prasad AVSM NM	6 November 1998	16 July 1999	Later Flag Officer Commanding-in-Chief Southern Naval Command and Vice Chief of the Naval Staff.
8	Rear Admiral K. Mohanan	16 July 1999	28 September 2001	
9	Rear Admiral S. K. Damle NM VSM	28 September 2001	16 April 2004	Later Flag Officer Commanding-in-Chief Southern Naval Command.
10	Rear Admiral Shekhar Sinha NM &bar	16 April 2004	23 February 2006	Later Flag Officer Commanding-in-Chief Western Naval Command
11	Rear Admiral S. M. Vadgaokar NM	23 February 2006	28 January 2009	
12	Rear Admiral Sudhir Pillai NM	29 January 2009	27 May 2012	
13	Rear Admiral Balvinder Singh Parhar NM	28 May 2012	26 March 2015	
14	Rear Admiral Ravneet Singh NM	27 March 2015	5 October 2015	Later Deputy Chief of the Naval Staff.
15	Rear Admiral Puneet Kumar Bahl VSM	6 October 2015	9 February 2018	Later Commandant of Indian Naval Academy.
16	Rear Admiral Philipose George Pynumootil AVSM NM	10 February 2018	30 April 2022	
17	Rear Admiral Vikram Menon VSM	1 May 2022	31 July 2023	Current Joint Secretary (Navy & Defence Staff) at the Department of Military Affairs.
18	Rear Admiral Ajay D. Theophilus	1 August 2023	Present	Current FONA.

== See also ==
- Indian Naval Air Arm

== Bibliography ==
- Singh, Satyindra (1992), Blueprint To Bluewater - The Indian Navy 1951-1965, Lancer Publishers, ISBN 81-7062-148-8
- Hiranandani, Gulab Mohanlal (2000), Transition To Triumph - Indian Navy 1965-1975, Lancer Publishers LLC, ISBN 1-897829-72-8
- Hiranandani, Gulab Mohanlal (2005), Transition to eminence : The Indian Navy 1976-1990, Lancer Publishers, ISBN 978-8170622666
- Hiranandani, Gulab Mohanlal (2009), Transition to Guardianship: The Indian Navy, 1991–2000, Lancer Publishers LLC, ISBN 978-1-935501-66-4
