= Flag Officer Naval Aviation =

Flag Officer Naval Aviation (FONA) may refer to:

- Flag Officer Naval Aviation (India)
- Assistant Chief of the Naval Staff (Aviation, Amphibious Capability & Carriers)
