= INAS 303 =

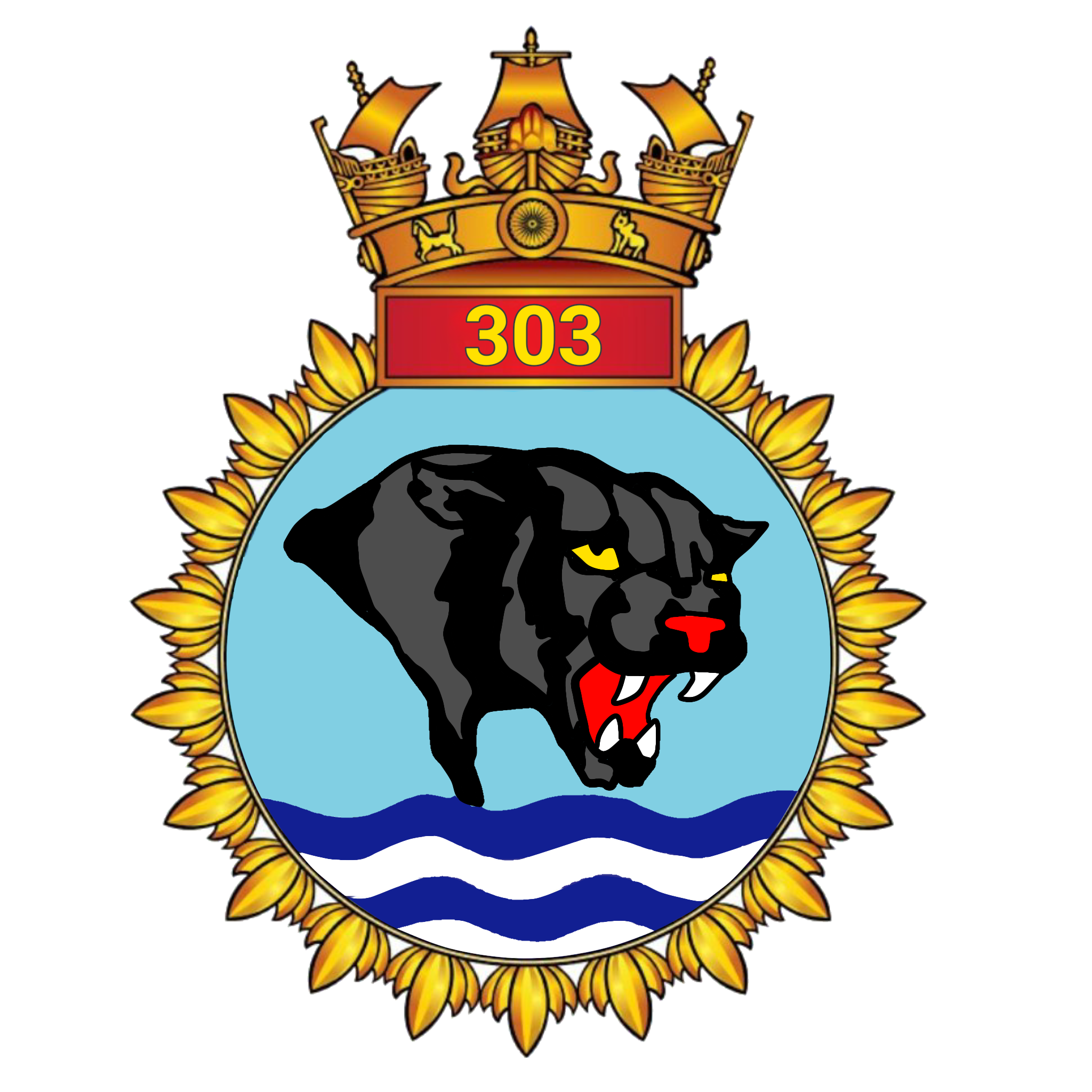
- INAS 303 Insignia
- Active: 11 May 2013 - present
- Country: India
- Branch: Indian Navy
- Garrison/HQ: INS Hansa
- Nickname(s): The Black Panthers

Aircraft flown
- Fighter: Mikoyan MiG-29K

The INAS 303 is an Indian naval air squadron based at INS Hansa.

== History ==
Indian Navy had contracted for acquisition of 16 MiG 29K/KUB carrier based fighter aircraft with RAC MiG on 20 January 2004. Aircraft deliveries began in December 2009 and all 16 aircraft of the main contract were delivered and accepted by the Indian Navy. An option clause contract for 29 additional aircraft was also signed on 8 March 2010. The option was exercised, with delivery of the last of these aircraft scheduled for the end of 2016. Based on the exploitation experience, the first MiG-29K frontline squadron was commissioned on 11 May 2013 at INS Hansa, Goa. Captain Ajay D. Theophilus was the commissioning Commanding Officer.

The INAS 303 is the only operational squadron that operates MiG-29K in the Indian Navy. The fighter pilots are qualified to the squadron after receiving jet training from INAS 551 and INAS 300 operating Hawk Mk 132 and MiG-29K, respectively.
