= Fort Convent School, Mumbai =

Jesus and Mary Fort Convent School

Location
- 15 Nathlal Parekh Marg, Fort, Mumbai 400001; India; 18.932840°N 72.835750°E

Information
- Type: Convent School
- Founded: 1855; 171 years ago
- Founder: St. Claudine Thevenet, Convent of Jesus and Mary, Mumbai, CJM
- School district: Mumbai
- Principal: Sr. Angela Raposo
- Grades: K-10
- Houses: St. George; St. Andrew; St. Patrick; St. David
- Athletics: Athletic events (track and field). Dance, theatre, recitation, oratory and leadership
- Athletics conference: Students Assemble
- Sports: Cricket, football, hockey, swimming, basketball, tennis, table tennis, volleyball
- Nickname: CJM... FCS, Fort Convent School
- Affiliation: SSC
- Alumni: Juhi Chawla; Kitu Gidwani; Lymaraina D'Souza
- Website: http://fortconvent.org

Convent of Jesus and Mary School, also known as Fort Convent, is an educational institution opened in the Fort area of Mumbai on 6 November 1855 by sisters belonging to the Congregation of Jesus and Mary. It was the first in the long chain of Jesus and Mary Schools to be set up in Western India. The school got the name “Fort Convent” as it was the first Convent in the Fort area. In 1904, the school was shifted to a two storeyed building adjoining the ‘Holy Name Cathedral’ at Wodehouse Road. It is a Christian Minority Institute affiliated with the Maharashtra State Board and currently admits students from Kindergarten to Class 10.

== Notable alumni ==
- Prerna Deosthalee, Lt Commander Prerna Deosthalee, Indian Navy; the first woman Warship commander.
- Madhabi Puri Buch, the first woman chairperson of the securities regulatory body Securities and Exchange Board of India (SEBI).
- Sana Saeed, actress and model
- Juhi Chawla, actress and Femina India Miss Universe 1984
- Lymaraina D'Souza, model and Femina India Miss Universe 1998
- Kitu Gidwani, designer, model, actress
- Barkha Singh, actress and model
- Priya Kishani, Professor Pediatrics, Head of Medical Genetics, Duke University, Reference below.
- Nermeen Varawalla, Chief Medical Officer Scancell, Gynaecologist, Obstetrician, Rhodes Scholar
- Vyjayanthi Chari, mathematics Professor at University of California Riverside, editor in chief of Algebras and Representation Theory.
- Shobana Narasimhan, Professor of Theoretical Sciences at Jawaharlal Nehru Centre for Advanced Scientific Research, Bengaluru, with a specialism in computational nanoscience. Reference below.

== See also ==
- List of schools in Mumbai
- List of the oldest schools in the world
