= Lymaraina D'Souza =

Indian model

- Born: 1979 (age 46–47); Mumbai, Maharashtra, India
- Education: Sydenham College
- Occupations: Model, Therapist
- Height: 181 cm (5 ft 11 in)
- Beauty pageant titleholder
- Title: Femina Miss India Universe 1998
- Major competitions: Femina Miss India 1998 (Femina Miss India Universe); Miss Universe 1998 (Top-10 finalists)

Lymaraina D'Souza (born 1979) is an Indian model and beauty pageant titleholder who won Femina Miss India Universe 1998 and represented her country at Miss Universe 1998 where she finished in the Top 10.

She subsequently got her master's degree in counseling and is licensed as a therapist. Lymaraina currently owns a private practice.

== Career ==
D'Souza was born in 1979 in Bombay and was educated at Fort Convent School, Mumbai and Sydenham College of Commerce and Economics.

She was crowned Femina Miss India Universe 1998 by the outgoing titleholder Nafisa Joseph. She represented India at Miss Universe 1998 held on 12 May 1998 at Stan Sheriff Arena in Honolulu, Hawaii, United States. She was among the top ten finalists. She was ranked second in the interview round, ninth in the swimsuit round and eighth in the evening gown round.

D'Souza subsequently went to Hawaii Pacific University and graduated with a B.A. in psychology in 2002.

Awards and achievements
Preceded by Nafisa Joseph	Femina Miss India; 1998	Succeeded by Gul Panag
