= INS Trinkat =

Indian naval vessel

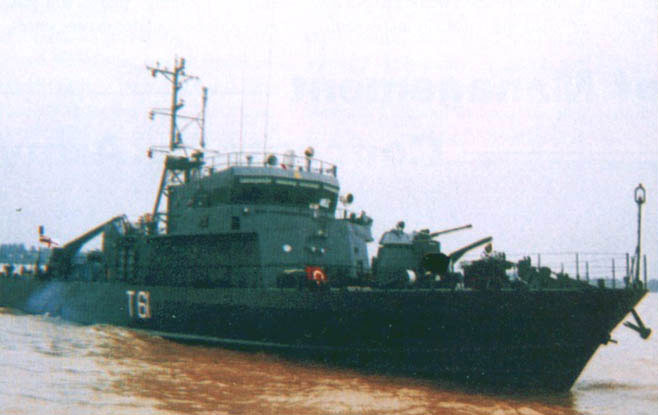
- INS Trinkat (T61)

Class overview
- Name: INS Trinkat
- Builders: Garden Reach Shipbuilders and Engineers
- Operators: Indian Navy
- Preceded by: Seaward class
- Succeeded by: Bangaram class

General characteristics
- Type: Fast attack craft
- Displacement: 260 ton (full load)
- Length: 46 m (151 ft)
- Beam: 7.5 m (25 ft)
- Propulsion: 2 × MTU engines (3,500 hp each); 3 × 80 kW diesel generators
- Speed: 30 kn (56 km/h; 35 mph)
- Complement: 33
- Armament: 1 × 2A42 Medak 30 mm gun

INS Trinkat is the lead ship of her class of fast attack craft of the Indian Navy were designed and constructed by Garden Reach Shipbuilders and Engineers in Kolkata, West Bengal.

== Role ==
The patrol vessel carry out fisheries protection, anti-poaching, counter-insurgency and search-and-rescue operations in coastal areas and in the exclusive economic zone. This ship is named after Trinkat Island. The vessels of the class are named after islands from the Andaman and Nicobar Islands or the Lakshadweep Islands.

== See also ==
- Action of 30 March 2010
- List of active Indian Navy ships
