= Commodore (India) =

Indian naval rank

Commodore कोमोडोर
- Flag of Commodore

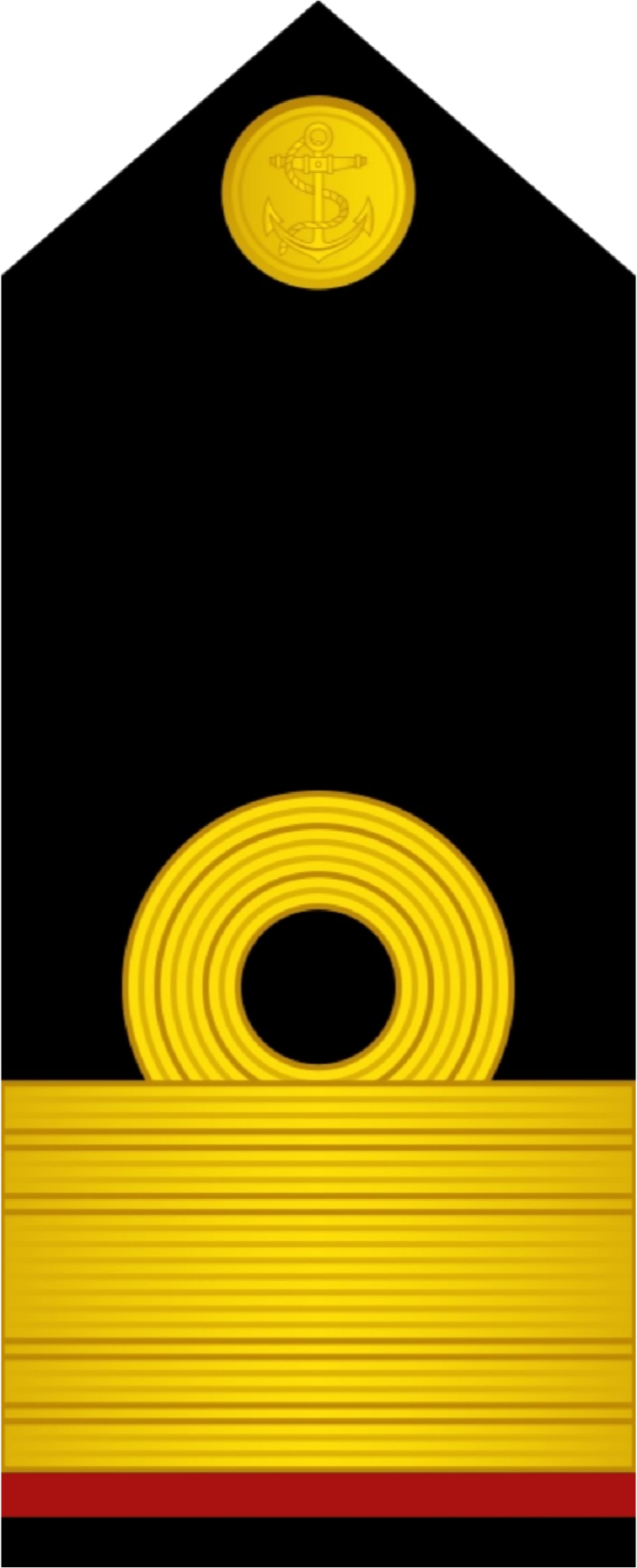
- Rank insignia of a Commodore and Surgeon Commodore

- Vehicle star plate of Commodore
- Country: India
- Service branch: Indian Navy
- Abbreviation: Cmde/ Surg Cmde
- Rank group: Flag officers
- Rank: One-star rank
- NATO rank code: OF-6
- Pay grade: Level 13A
- Next higher rank: Rear admiral
- Next lower rank: Captain
- Equivalent ranks: Brigadier (Indian Army); Air commodore (Indian Air Force)

Commodore is a one-star rank in the Indian Navy. Commodore ranks above the rank of captain and below the two-star rank of rear admiral.

The equivalent rank in the Indian Army is brigadier and in the Indian Air Force is air commodore.

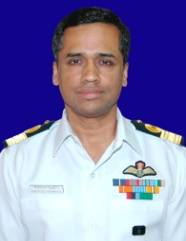
Cmde PG Pyunumootil in a commodore's uniform.

== History ==
After the Independence of India, Captain Ajitendu Chakraverti was the first Indian to be promoted to the rank of commodore, when he took over as the officiating Chief of Staff at Naval Headquarters.

== Appointments ==
Officers in the rank of commodore hold important appointments like Commodore Commanding Submarines (COMCOS). The command and control of all submarines with the Western and Eastern Naval Commands resides with the COMCOS. The COMCOS (West) and COMCOS (East) report into the FOC-in-C of their respective commands. Officers in the rank of commodore serve as commanding officers of shore establishments like INS Hansa, INS Shivaji, etc. Commodores also fill appointments of naval officer-in-charge (NOIC) of naval areas. The naval attachés and naval advisors at India's high commissions and embassies in select countries are officers of the rank of commodore. At Naval headquarters, commodores hold the appointments of principal directors of directorates and branches.

== Insignia ==
The flag of a commodore has a gold-blue octagon bearing naval crest in the middle, and a blue star at hoist side. The badge of rank consists of a band of gold lace, with a circle of lace above. A commodore wears gorget patches which are golden patches with one white star. In addition to this, the double-breasted reefer jacket has one broad golden sleeve stripe with a circle above.

== Pay scale ==
Commodores are at pay level 13A, with a monthly basic pay between ₹139,600 (US$1,500) and ₹217,600 (US$2,300) with a monthly service pay of ₹15,500 (US$170).

== Famous Indian commodores ==
- Arogyaswami Paulraj - Electrical engineer and inventor

== See also ==
- Naval ranks and insignia of India

== Bibliography ==
- Singh, Anup (2018), Blue Waters Ahoy!: The Indian Navy 2001-2010, HarperCollins Publishers India, ISBN 978-9353025526
