= Dabolim =

- village
- Location of Dabolim in Goa Dabolim (India)
- Coordinates: 15°22′46.24″N 73°50′40.15″E
- Country: India
- State: Goa
- District: South Goa
- Sub-district: Mormugão

Languages
  - Official: Konkani
- Time zone: UTC+5:30 (IST)
- PIN: 403801
- Area code: 0832
- Vehicle registration: GA
- Website: goa.gov.in

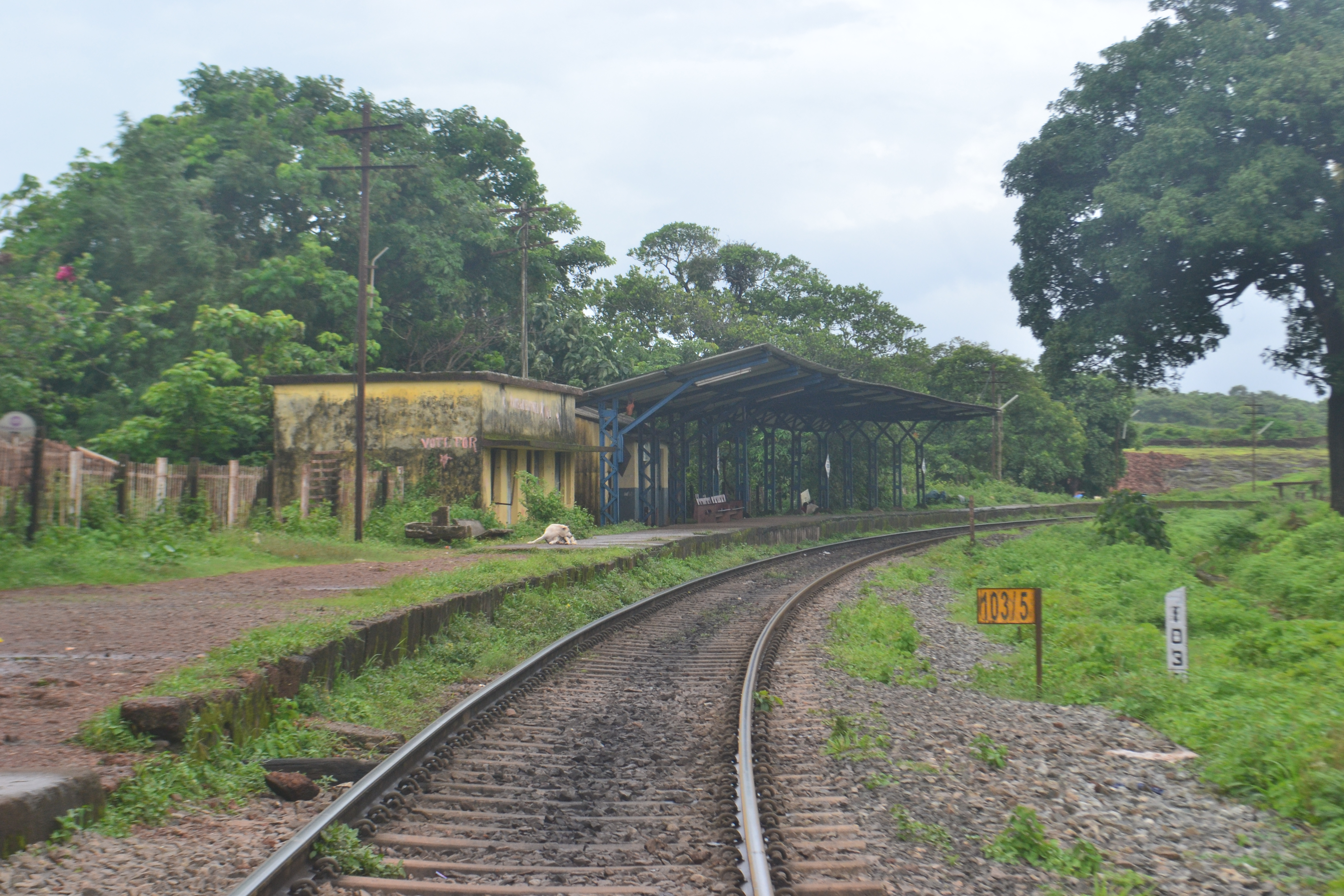
Old Dabolim Railway Station

Dabolim is a village, with a total population of around 6700, in Mormugão, Goa, India. It is located about 30 km from the state capital Panjim, 23 km from the South Goa district headquarters Margão and 5 kilometres from Vasco da Gama, the headquarters of Mormugão. Dabolim Airport, the first airport in Goa, is located here.

== Government and politics ==
Dabolim is part of Dabolim (Goa Assembly constituency). Its representative in the Goa Legislative Assembly is Mauvin Godinho. It is also part of South Goa (Lok Sabha constituency).
