= 30 Years Long Service Medal =

Indian army award

- Ribbon of the 30 Years Long Service Medal
- Type: Military long service medal
- Country: India
- Presented by: India
- Eligibility: All ranks of the Indian Armed Forces
- Campaign: Currently awarded
- Established: 1980

Order of Wear
- Next (higher): 25th Independence Anniversary Medal
- Next (lower): 20 Years Long Service Medal

The 30 Years Long Service Medal is awarded to personnel of the Indian Armed Forces, of all ranks, on completion of unblemished service of thirty years.

== History ==
The 30 Years Long Service Medal was instituted in 1980 by the Government of India, with the approval of the President of India.

== Medal ==
The medal is circular in shape and is made of cupronickel. On the obverse is the National Emblem with the words 30 Years Long Service in English and Hindi. On the reverse are the coats of arms of the three services - the sword, the anchor and the wings, all beneath a rising sun. The ribbon is orange in colour and features a central stripe of red, dark blue, and light blue in that order.

== See also ==
- 9 Years Long Service Medal
- 20 Years Long Service Medal
