= 20 Years Long Service Medal =

Indian army award

- Ribbon of the 20 Years Long Service Medal
- Type: Military long service medal
- Country: India
- Presented by: India
- Eligibility: All ranks of the Indian Armed Forces
- Campaign: Currently awarded
- Established: 19 April 1971

Order of Wear
- Next (higher): 30 Years Long Service Medal
- Next (lower): 9 Years Long Service Medal

The 20 Years Long Service Medal is awarded to personnel of the Indian Armed Forces, of all ranks, on completion of unblemished service of twenty years.

== History ==
The 20 Years Long Service Medal was instituted on 19 April 1971 by the Government of India, with the approval of the President of India. One other medal was instituted on the same day - the 9 Years Long Service Medal.

== Medal ==
The medal is circular in shape and is made of cupronickel. On the obverse is the National Emblem with the words 20 Years Long Service in English and Hindi. On the reverse are the coats of arms of the three services - the sword, the anchor and the wings, all beneath a rising sun. The ribbon is red, dark blue and light blue colours in equal parts in that order.

== See also ==
- 9 Years Long Service Medal
- 30 Years Long Service Medal
