= Captain (Indian Navy) =

Rank in the Indian Navy

- Rank insignia of a captain of the Indian Navy

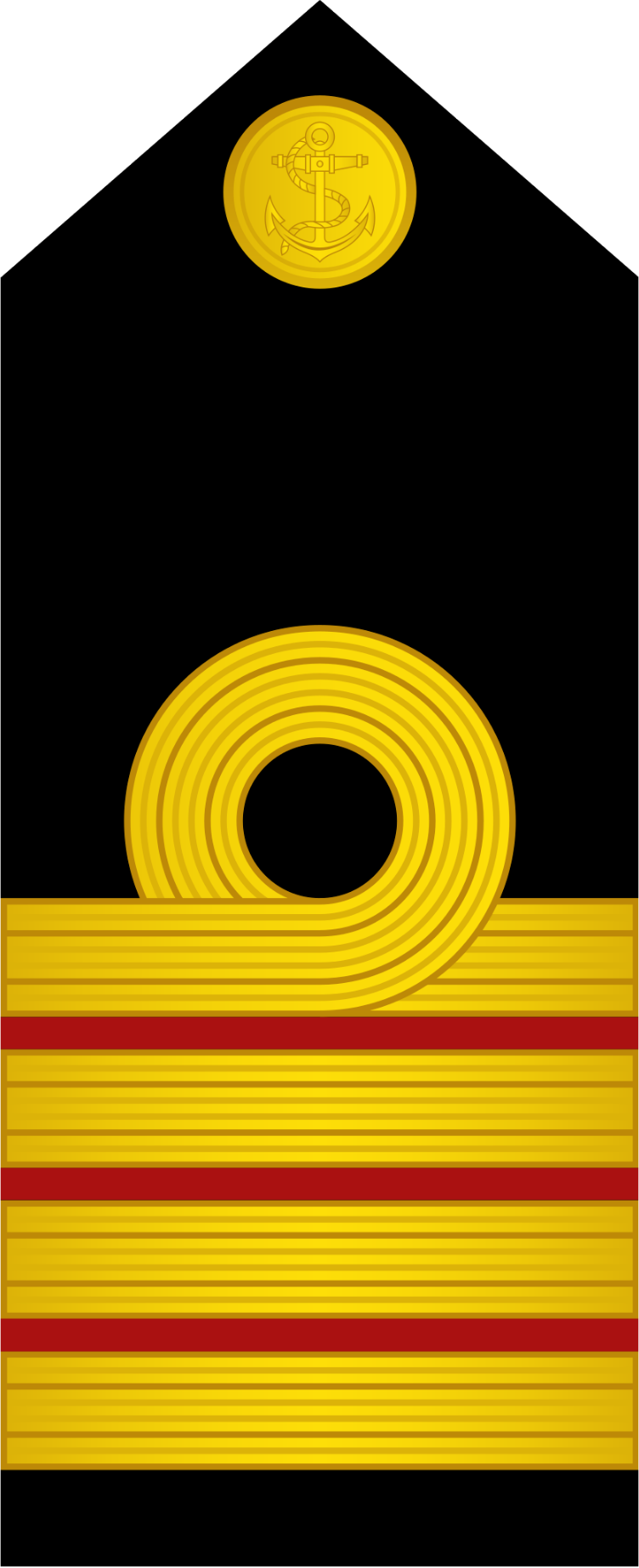
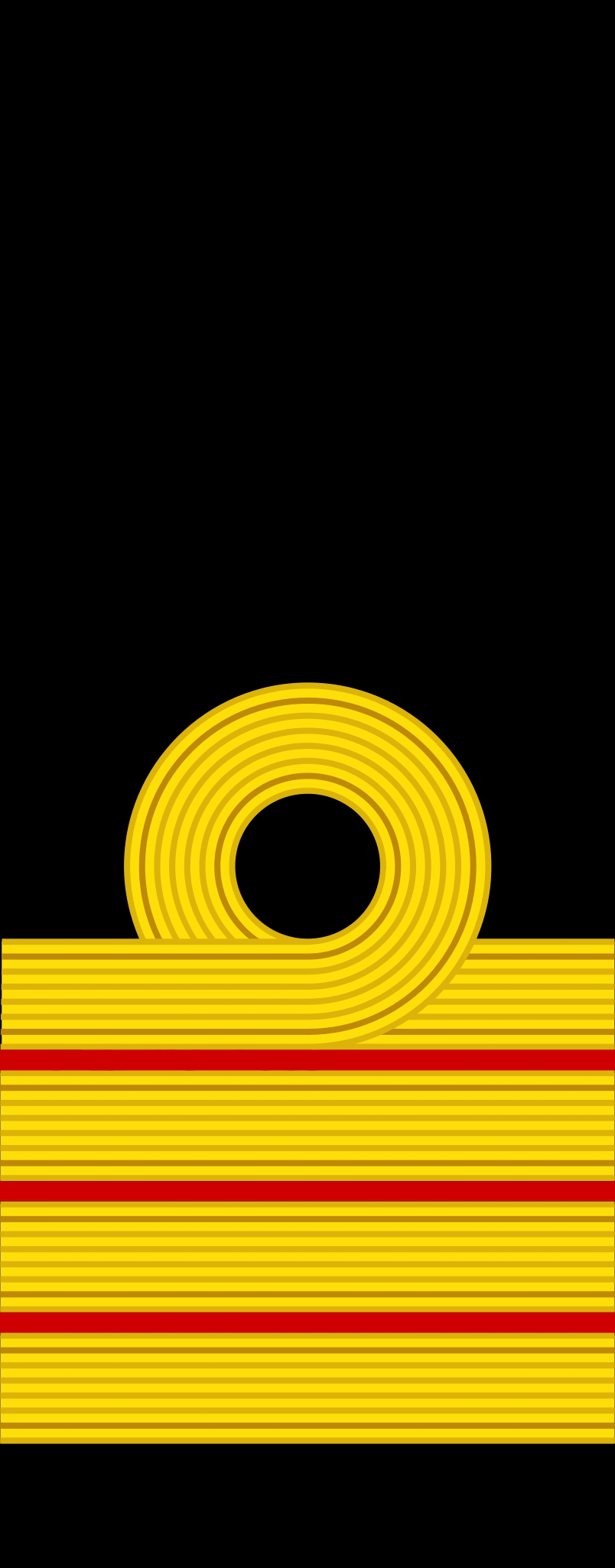
- Rank insignia of Surgeon Captain of the Indian Navy
- Country: India
- Service branch: Indian Navy
- Abbreviation: Capt/ Surg Capt
- Rank group: Senior officers
- Rank: Captain
- NATO rank code: OF-5
- Pay grade: Level 13
- Next higher rank: Commodore
- Next lower rank: Commander
- Equivalent ranks: Colonel (Indian Army); Group captain (Indian Air Force)

Captain is a rank in the Indian Navy. Captain ranks above the rank of commander and lower than a commodore. It is equivalent to colonel in the Indian Army and group captain in the Indian Air Force.

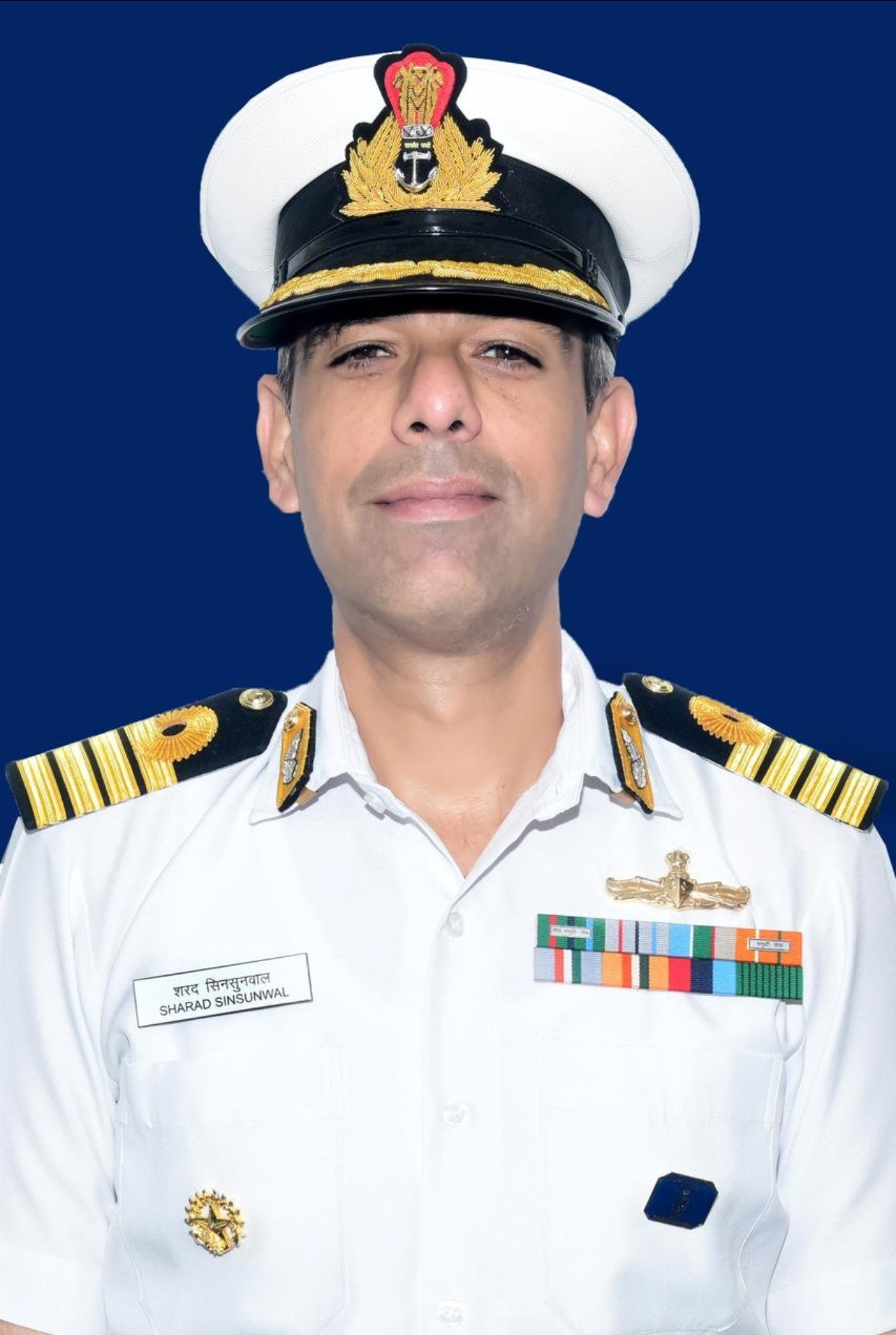
Sharad Sinsunwal in captain insignia

== Terminology ==
An officer in command of any warship is informally referred to as "the captain" on board, even if holding a junior rank. The formal title is Commanding officer (CO). Destroyers and frigates afloat were grouped into squadrons, which was commanded by the captain (D) and captain (F) respectively. Apart from operational command of the squadron, he also commanded the lead ship of the squadron.

To distinguish the rank from the junior rank of captain in the Indian Army, the term Captain (IN) is used.

== History ==
On 21 July 1947, Commanders HMS Choudri and Bhaskar Sadashiv Soman were promoted to the acting rank of captain, the first Indians to attain the rank. Soman was appointed chief of personnel in this rank. After the partition of India, Choudri opted to join the Pakistan Navy and rose to become the first native commander-in-chief.

== Appointments ==
Captains in the Indian Navy command the important ships. Officers in the rank of captain also serve as executive officers of shore establishments like INS Valsura, INS Shivaji, etc. The naval attachés and naval advisors at India's high commissions and embassies in most countries are officers of the rank of captain. At Naval headquarters, captains hold the appointments of directors of directorates and branches.

=== Indian Navy Medical Service ===
Surgeon captains in the Indian Navy Medical Service are usually appointed as head of department in larger fleet hospitals such as INHS Asvini, or as commanding officers (CO) in smaller fleet hospitals such as INHS Navjivani, or may serve in a staff role as fleet medical advisor.

== Insignia ==
The badge of rank consists of four rings of gold braid with a loop in the upper ring. A captain wears gorget patches which are golden patches with white braids. In addition to this, the double-breasted reefer jacket has four golden sleeve stripes with a circle above.

== Pay scale ==
Captains are at pay level 13, with a monthly pay between ₹130,600 (US$1,400) and ₹215,900 (US$2,200) with a monthly service pay of ₹15,500 (US$160). This is the first selection-grade rank. The promotion to the rank can happen through selection or on time-scale basis. A minimum of 15 years of commissioned service is required for an officer to be considered in the selection grade. This is the highest rank which may be attained by officers on time-scale promotion if not promoted to captain by selection after 26 years of commissioned service.

== See also ==
- Naval ranks and insignia of India
