= INS Hansa =

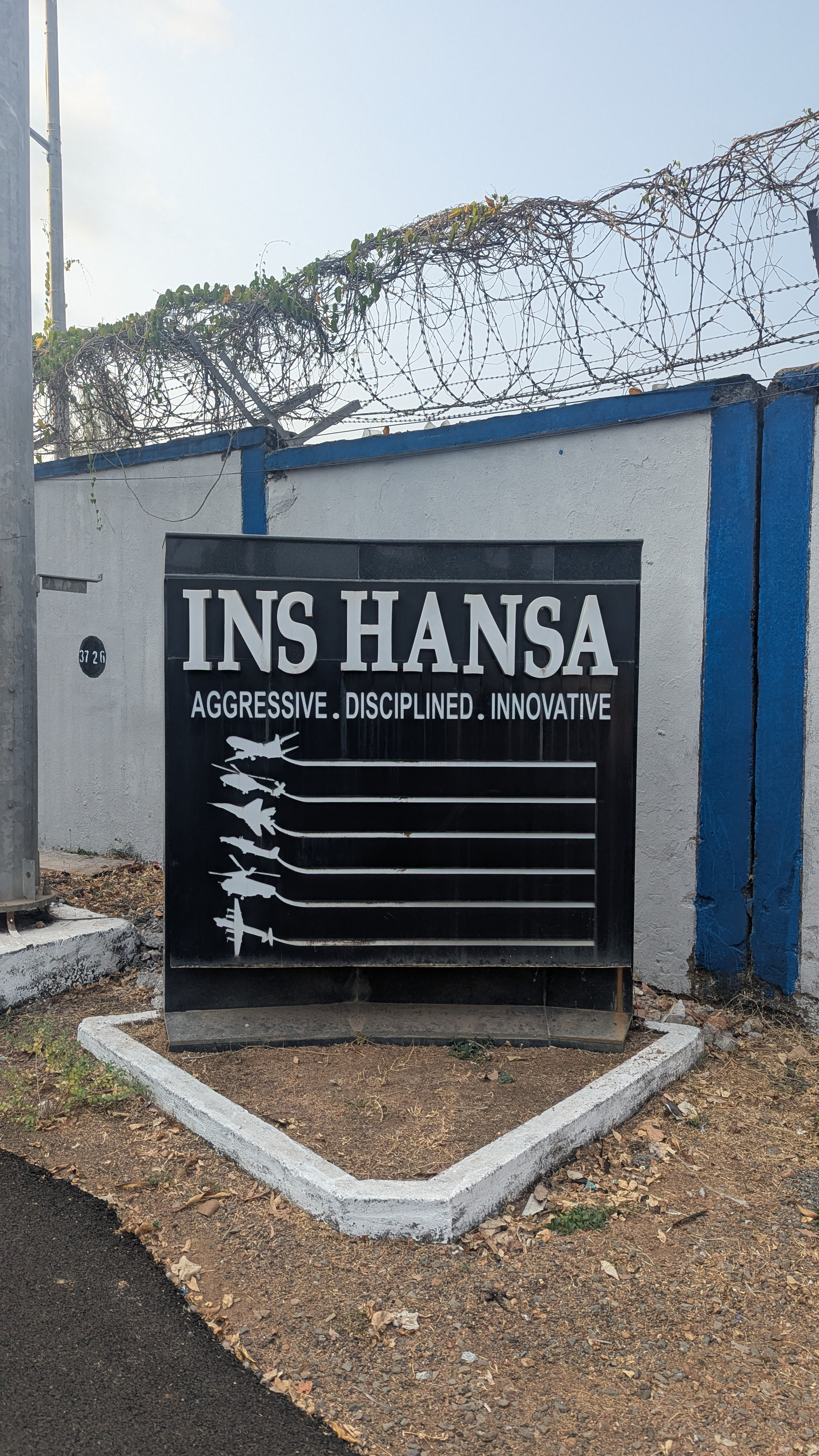
- Gate of INS Hansa
- IATA: none; ICAO: VOGO

Summary
- Airport type: Naval Air Station
- Operator: Indian Navy
- Location: Dabolim, Goa, India
- Elevation AMSL: 184 ft (56 m)
- Coordinates: 15°22′51″N 073°49′53″E
- Interactive map of INS Hansa

Runways
Direction	Length		Surface
Direction	ft	m	Surface
08/26	11,345	3,458	Asphalt

INS Hansa, (IATA: N/A, ICAO: VOGO) is an Indian naval air station located near Dabolim in Goa, India. It is India's biggest naval airbase. The military air base has a civil enclave, that operates as Dabolim Airport.

== History ==
INS Hansa was commissioned on 5 September 1961 at Sulur near Coimbatore, Tamil Nadu. It was initially co-located with the Sulur Air Force Station of the Indian Air Force. It was then home to INAS 551 squadron, operating de Havilland Vampire aircraft, as well as training establishments for Hawker Sea Hawk and Breguet Alizé aircraft. After the liberation of Goa in December 1961, INS Hansa was transferred to Dabolim. In 1983, the Indian Navy began inducting the BAE Sea Harrier into service, basing training activities at Dabolim until the Harriers were retired in 2016. Now the base houses MiG-29KUBs, the tandem two-seat operational trainer variant of the carrier based MIG-29Ks. The aircraft has been inducted into the Navy with a complement of 12 MiG 29Ks that have been purchased with the aircraft carrier INS Vikramaditya (re-fitted and refurbished Admiral Gorshkov of the Russian Navy).

Besides the operation of the MiGs, the Navy also operates Kamov Ka-28 anti-submarine helicopters, along with Ilyushin Il-38 May and TU-142M Bear aircraft. Dabolim airbase also hosts exercises by the Indian Air Force's fighter bombers and it has facilities for the Indian Coast Guard which operates a fleet of small aircraft such as Dornier 228s. The Indian Navy also carries out long range maritime patrols as far as the Horn of Africa from Dabolim.

The navy has an aerobatic team, based at Dabolim, called the Sagar Pawan. The team comprises three Kiran aircraft which carry out aerobatic displays at various locations in the country. The team is used in one or two annual public events in Goa for flypasts of 15 to 20 minutes duration. The navy also operates a naval aviation museum near Dabolim Airport.

The Indian Navy's Shore Based Test Facility (SBTF), which is a mock-up of the 283-metre (928 ft) INS Vikramaditya deck built on the airfield at Hansa is used to train and certify navy pilots of the Mikoyan MiG-29K for operating from the aircraft carrier, and for the developmental trials of the naval HAL Tejas. This SBTF was designed by Nevskoye Design Bureau (NDB) of Russia for Aeronautical Development Agency (ADA).

From 6 January 2022, a 12-day demonstration of the Dassault Rafale M took place at the 283 metre-long shore-based test facility in Goa. Between 20 May and 15 June 2022, two Boeing F/A-18 Super Hornet Block III aircraft completed "operational demonstration tests" in the same facility. Trials included multiple ski-jumps, roll-ins, fly-in-arrestments in various configurations including air-to-air, air-to-ground, and air-to-surface making the jet "compliant" with Indian Navy aircraft carriers. In October 2026, French Rafales began testing at the Short Takeoff and Landing facility in order to fine tune the modifications required for Shipboard usage of the Rafale MH on INS Vikrant.

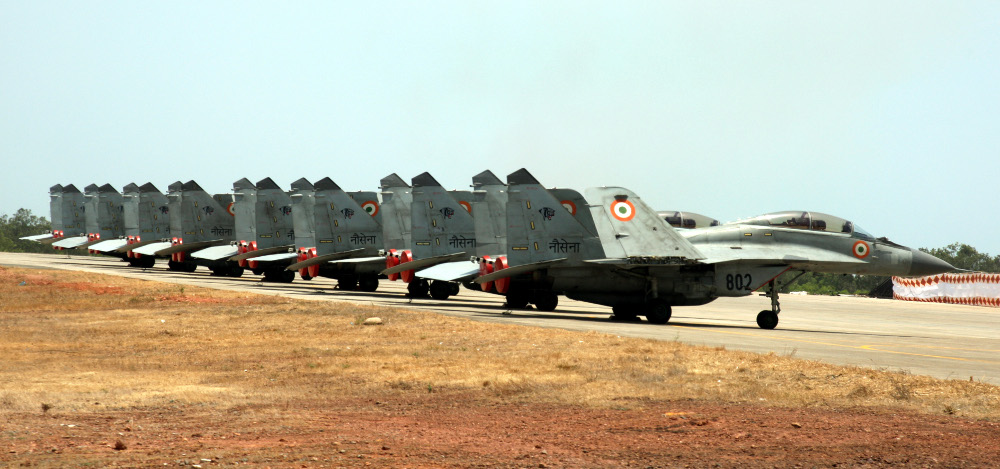
MiG-29Ks of INAS 303

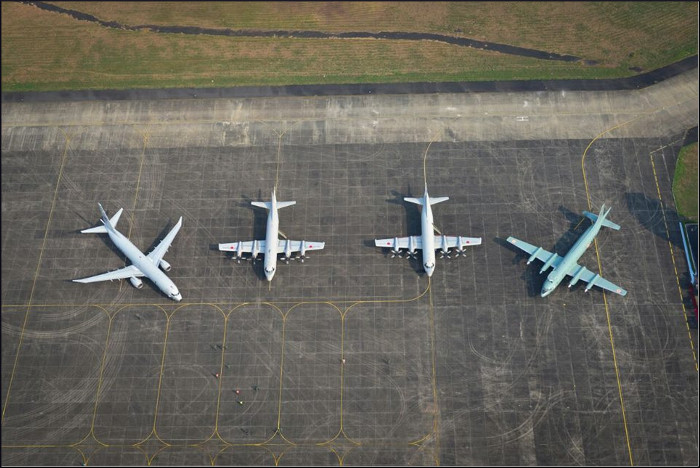
P3C Orion aircraft of JMSDF at INS Hansa

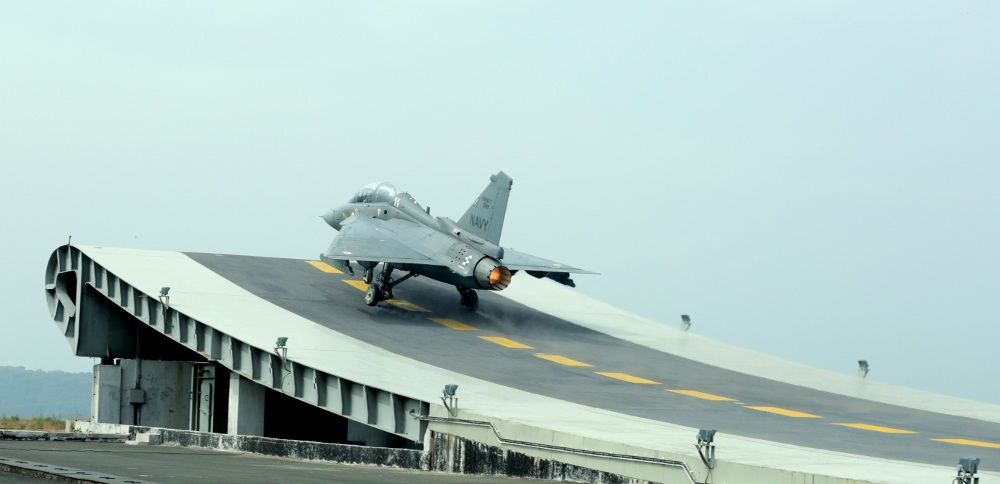
Test flight of HAL Tejas Naval at INS Hansa

== Units ==
Over 2,000 military personnel and 1,000 civilians are based at INS Hansa. It is home to 9 Indian Naval Air Squadrons (INAS).

Among the units based here are:

- INAS 300, "White Tigers", operating Mikoyan MiG-29K fighters
- INAS 303, "Black Panthers" operating Mikoyan MiG-29K fighters
- INAS 321, "Angels", operating HAL Chetak helicopters for search and rescue
- INAS 322, "Hornets", operating HAL Dhruv helicopters for search and rescue
- INAS 339, "Falcons", operating Kamov Ka-31 AEW helicopters
- INAS 310, "Cobras", operating Dornier 228 maritime surveillance aircraft
- INAS 552, "Xplorers", the only flight testing unit of the Indian Navy
- INAS 323, "Harriers", operating HAL Dhruv helicopters for search and rescue
- INAS 316, "Condors", operating P-8I Neptune aircraft for surveillance

== See also ==
Indian navy

- List of Indian Navy bases
- List of active Indian Navy ships

Integrated commands and units

- Armed Forces Special Operations Division
- Defence Cyber Agency
- Integrated Defence Staff
- Integrated Space Cell
- Indian Nuclear Command Authority
- Indian Armed Forces
- Special Forces of India

Other lists

- Strategic Forces Command
- List of Indian Air Force stations
- List of Indian Navy bases
- Overseas military bases of India
