= Operation Sankalp =

India's maritime security operation

- Part of Red Sea crisis, Middle Eastern crisis (2023–present), Piracy off the coast of Somalia, 2026 Iran war
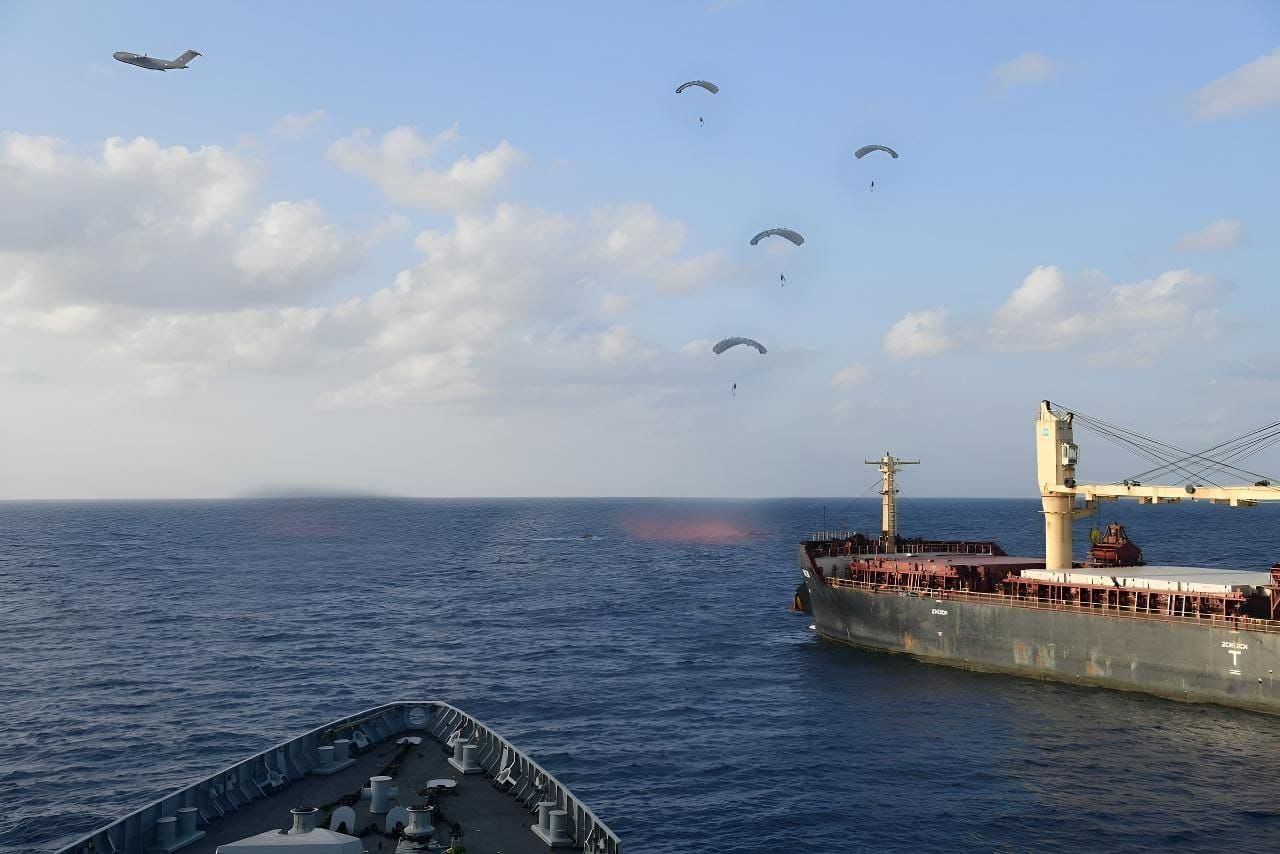
- On 16 March 2024, IAF C-17, in cooperation with INS Kolkata, paradropped two combat boats, armament load and MARCOS teams were inserted to rescue 17 crew members of MV Ruen held hostage by 35 pirates.'
- Type: Naval operation
- Location: Red Sea; Gulf of Aden; Arabian Sea; Strait of Hormuz; Indian Ocean
- Planned by: India
- Objective: Protection of Local Commercial Shipping; Anti-Piracy and Anti-Terrorism operations; Uninterrupted flow of energy supplies to the country; Protection of national Sea lines of communication
- Date: 19 June 2019 – present (7 years, 3 months, 2 weeks and 1 day)
- Executed by: Indian Armed Forces; Indian Navy; Indian Air Force
- Outcome: Ongoing Crisis

Operation Sankalp is the Indian Navy's initiative aimed at ensuring the security of the regional maritime domain. The term Sankalp originates from Sanskrit and signifies the concept of "Commitment". It aligns with the Indian Navy's objective of safeguarding India's shipping interests and trade routes.

Launched on 19 June 2019, Operation Sankalp primarily focused on guaranteeing the safe transit of Indian-flagged vessels passing through the Strait of Hormuz amidst escalating security concerns in the area. The protection of India's commercial fleet and maritime commerce is emphasised as a significant goal within the Indian Navy's responsibilities. Due to the intricate nature of the mission and the global context in which Indian Naval vessels operate, Op Sankalp is being executed in the Indian Ocean Region (IOR) through active engagement and meticulous coordination with the Indian Ministries of Defence, External Affairs, Shipping, Petroleum and Natural Gas, and the Directorate General of Shipping.

== Background ==
The utilization of a blue-water navy is underpinned by characteristics such as operational reach, flexibility, and visibility. The activities undertaken by a country's naval forces to advance national interests reflect, in varying degrees, both broader strategic priorities and political objectives. Since 2008, piracy has emerged as a significant maritime security concern in the Indian Ocean Region (IOR), contributing to the deployment of warships by a range of regional and extra-regional navies. Within this context, the Indian Navy has assumed a prominent role in maritime security operations and has sought to position itself as a ‘First Responder’ and ‘Preferred Security Partner’ in the IOR. Its deployments have involved a combination of surface vessels, maritime aircraft, and Special Forces, reflecting the range of capabilities available for addressing piracy and other non-traditional maritime security challenges. These activities form part of India's broader efforts to safeguard maritime interests and contribute to security and stability across the region.

The Persian Gulf is an important component of India's and West Asia’s maritime trade and energy security, given the scale of its economic relations with the Gulf Cooperation Council (GCC) states. In FY2025-26, India's bilateral goods trade with the six GCC countries remained at approximately US$178.63 billion, comprising US$55.69 billion in exports and US$122.92 billion in imports. The UAE remains India's largest GCC trading partner, with bilateral trade of approximately US$101.25 billion, followed by Saudi Arabia at US$41.07 billion. These figures are consistent with FY2024-25, when India-GCC bilateral trade was valued at US$178.56 billion, comprising US$56.87 billion in exports and US$121.68 billion in imports. The composition of this trade also highlights the importance of the Gulf region to India's energy requirements. India's major imports from GCC countries include crude oil, liquefied natural gas (LNG) mainly from Qatar, liquefied petroleum gas (LPG) primarily from the UAE, petrochemicals and other mineral fuels, these substantial energy and commercial flows pass through maritime routes linking the Persian Gulf, Strait of Hormuz and Arabian Sea, making the security of these sea lanes directly relevant to India's economic interests. It was in this context that the Indian Navy launched Operation Sankalp in June 2019, deploying warships to the Gulf of Oman and the Gulf to reassure Indian-flagged vessels following maritime-security incidents in the region. The operation has subsequently remained part of India's presence in the area, including deployments intended to support the safe movement of Indian-linked commercial and energy shipping through the Gulf and its approaches.

== Early deployments ==
From June 2019 to May 2021, fleet of 20 Indian warships were deployed under Operation Sankalp to safeguard the journey of over 200 Indian Flag Vessels transporting more than 21 million tonnes of cargo in the IOR.

In November 2021, INS Trikand was dispatched to the Persian Gulf and Gulf of Oman under Operation Sankalp, an initiative by the Indian Navy to uphold a prominent vessel in the area, guaranteeing the unhindered and protected transportation of goods, fostering trust within the maritime community, and actively contributing to the overall security of the regional waters. The ship stopped at Manama and during its stay at the port, the personnel engaged with Bahrain's counterparts to enhance maritime security. Trikand, a cutting-edge frigate equipped with guided missiles and stealth technology, serves as a vital component of the Western Fleet. It operates under the command of the Flag Officer Commanding-in-Chief, Western Naval Command, which is headquartered in Mumbai.

India enacted its anti-piracy legislation as the Maritime Anti-Piracy Act 2022, on 20 December 2022 criminalising maritime piracy and empowering the Indian Navy and other government agencies with the authority to respond to threats at sea. In 2024, the then Chief of Naval Staff Admiral R. Hari Kumar referred to the new law as a "great enabler" in the navy's anti-piracy success.

In regular circumstances, this deployment would have been considered as a standard procedure. Nevertheless, during the COVID-19 pandemic situation, the Indian Navy's capability to deploy its warships demonstrated their exceptional operational readiness and availability. This also highlighted the stringent protocols and mechanisms implemented by the Indian Navy to minimise the impact of SARS-CoV-2 on their personnel, thereby ensuring uninterrupted deployments and operations. Consequently, in addition to their continuous anti-piracy patrols and Op-Sankalp, the Indian Navy effectively executed numerous deployments and operations.

== 2023–24 ==
On 14 December 2023, Operation Sankalp was re-initiated to ensure the security of the regional maritime domain due to the Red Sea crisis and sudden increase in marine pirate activities. The Indian Navy on 31 December 2023 said it had deployed P-8I Neptune and the SeaGuardian drones, following the distressed faced by two merchant vessels, MV Ruen and MV Chem Pluto which were targeted in the sea. MV Ruen was hijacked (later rescued by INS Kolkata) while MV Chem Pluto sustained drone hits eventually and making way to port. The Indian Navy deployed a large flotilla of destroyers to safeguard international security. The deployment into the Arabian Sea included missile destroyers, including INS Kolkata, INS Kochi, INS Mormugao, INS Chennai and INS Visakhapatnam, almost its entire modern destroyer fleet of its Western Fleet. INS Kolkata was deployed at the mouth of the Red Sea, INS Kochi on the south of Yemen's Socotra Island, INS Mormugao in the west Arabian Sea with INS Chennai in the central Arabian Sea. INS Visakhapatnam was also moved in a week later and was tasked to patrol the north Arabian Sea.

From December 2023 to March 2024, around 5,000 troops have been deployed at sea with over 450 ship days have been completed (using over 21 ships), and maritime surveillance aircraft have flown 900 hours under Operation Sankalp.

In 2024, as per a report, the Indian Navy deployed over 30 ships as Houthi militants targeted multiple cargo vessels in and around the Red Sea with drone and missile attacks. "The Navy responded to over 25 such incidents and safely escorted over 230 merchant vessels carrying around 90 lakh metric tonnes of cargo valued at over USD 4 billion", according to official data.

Date	Ship attacked	Rescued by	Cause
Date	Details		
15-19 December 2023	MV Ruen (Malta)	INS Kolkata, INS Subhadra	Piracy
15-19 December 2023	MV Reun was attacked and hijacked by Somali pirates in their first attempt since 2017. Indian Navy quickly responded to the situation. Following Indian Navy P-8I Neptune MPA locating those ships, Kochi as well as the Spanish ship Victoria and the JS Akenebono immediately sailed behind them and are proceeding to Mogadishu harbour in Somalia, the estimated location of the pirates are taking the Reun. INS Kochi, on its part, was shadowing MV Ruen in a “wait-and-watch” mode since a direct intervention could have led to casualties among the crew being held hostage by the pirates. On 19 December, the hijackers freed a Bulgarian hostage so that he could receive medical assistance after being injured by gunshot. The sailor was treated on board and is now being taken to a shore-based medical facility in Oman for further evaluation. The destroyer kept trailing MV Reun and further action shall be decided by the owners of the shipping company. MV Ruen was intercepted again by INS Kolkata on 16 March 2024 and the pirates were captured.		
18 January 2024	MV Genco Picardy (Marshall Islands)	INS Visakhapatnam	Drone attack
18 January 2024	Visakhapatnam responded to a distress call from the Marshall Island-flagged MV Genco Picardy following a drone attack by unknown attackers at 11:11 pm IST on the night of 17 January. The Indian naval ship acknowledged the distress call and intercepted the vessel at 12:30 am IST the next day and provided support. Genco Picardy had 22 crew, including 9 Indian sailors. Following an EOD inspection by the ship's specialists, the ship was cleared to continue its journey without any casualties incurred aboard.		
26 January 2024	MV Marlin Luanda (Marshall Islands)	INS Visakhapatnam, USS Carney, French frigate Alsace	Missile strike
26 January 2024	Following a distress call from the British owned, Marshall Islands flagged oil tanker MV Marlin Luanda on the night of 26 January 2024, Visakhapatnam responded to aid the ship in its fire fighting efforts by deploying its NBCD team (Nuclear-Biological-Chemical Defence and Damage control) along with firefighting equipment on board. The ship was reportedly attacked by the Houthis at approximately 7:45 pm and it had 22 Indians and one Bangladeshi crew member aboard. USS Carney (DDG 64) (also targeted by a Houthi missile, but shot down), the French frigate Alsace and other Operation Prosperity Guardian coalition ships also responded and rendered assistance. No injuries were reported as the fire had broken out in the cargo compartment. The vessel sailed to a safe harbour under its own power.		
29 January 2024	FV Iman (Iran)	INS Sumitra	Piracy
29 January 2024	INS Sumitra successfully rescued fishermen hijacked by pirates along the East coast of Somalia and the Gulf of Aden. The naval warship was responding to a distress message regarding hijacking of an Iranian-flagged Fishing Vessel (FV) Iman. The pirates boarded the fishing boat and its 17-member crew was taken hostage. Acting in accordance with the Standard Operation Procedures the crew successfully coerced the pirates and released the crew along with the boat. The FV was then sanitised and continued for their destination.		
29-30 January 2024	FV Al Naeemi (Iran)	INS Sumitra, MARCOS	Piracy
29-30 January 2024	INS Sumitra rescued 19 Pakistani sailors after pirates hijacked their fishing vessel off the east coast of Somalia the previous day. Eleven armed pirates climbed onto another Iranian-flagged fishing vessel FV Al Naeemi and took 19 crew members, all Pakistanis, as hostage. The Navy warship intercepted the fishing vessel and coerced the pirates to release the hostages. The Navy warship intercepted the fishing vessel and forced the pirates to release the hostages with the help of MARCOS on 29 January. Warning shots were then fired in the water to pressurise the Somali pirates who had taken control of the vessel the Indian Navy deployed its HAL Dhruv as a part of psychological warfare. The pirates dumped their weapons when INS Sumitra approached them. Armed with Tavor TAR-21 and other combat gear, the MARCOS brought the pirates and were disarmed. No injuries were reported in the swift operation in which the Navy captured AK-47s and several mobile and satellite phones from the pirates' possession. The incident took place in southern Arabian Sea approximately 850 nm west of Kochi.		
22 February 2024	MV Islander (Palau)	INS Kolkata	Missile attack
22 February 2024	On 22 February 2024, Palau-flagged MV Islander came under Houthi attack of two anti-ship ballistic missiles. INS Kolkata, nearest to the ship rushed to assistance and An explosive disposal and medical team was sent to the vessel for assisteance. The ship could continue its journey forward.		
4 March 2024	MSC Sky II (Liberia)	INS Kolkata	Drone attack
4 March 2024	INS Kolkata, deployed to the Gulf of Aden, responded to a request from MSC Sky II, a Liberian flagged container vessel. The ship had reportedly been attacked by a drone or missile 90 nm southeast of Aden. The ship's master reported smoke and flames onboard following the attack. INS Kolkata was quickly redirected to provide the required support and reached the incident site. The Kolkata then escorted the ship from the area of the incident into the territorial seas of Djibouti. On 5 March, a specialised firefighting team from Kolkata boarded the Sky II and extinguished the remaining fires and an explosive ordnance disposal team boarded the Sky II to evaluate residual risk. The crew were safe and the ship then continued sailing towards its next destination.		
4 January 2024	MV Lila Norfolk (Liberia)	INS Chennai, MARCOS	Piracy
4 January 2024	MV Lila Norfolk sailing from Port Du Aco in Brazil to Khalifa Bin Salman in Bahrain was hijacked by pirates 460 nautical miles east off Somalia. It had sent a message indicating boarding by around five to six unknown armed personnel. Of the 21 crew members, 15 were Indian and the other 6 hailed from the Philippines. INS Chennai was deployed to render assistance while a maritime patrol aircraft overflew the vessel the next morning and established contact with the vessel. On 5 January 2024, after providing warnings, the MARCOS commandos from the INS Chennai boarded the ship to rescue all crew members. The pirates had abandoned ship prior to the boarding.		
6 March 2024	MV True Confidence (Barbados)	INS Kolkata	Drone/missile attack
6 March 2024	INS Kolkata responded to another crisis in the Gulf of Aden. About 55 nautical miles southwest of Aden, a drone or missile struck the Barbados-flagged bulk carrier MV True Confidence. When INS Kolkata arrived on the site, it used its onboard aircraft and boats and rescued 21 crew members, including an Indian national, via life rafts. The injured crew members received vital medical attention from the ship's medical experts.		
16 March 2024	ex-MV Ruen (Malta)	INS Kolkata, INS Subhadra (P51), MARCOS	Piracy
16 March 2024	Indian Navy's Marine Commandos (MARCOS) were deployed via IAF's C-17 aircraft in a rescue operation involving the bulk carrier MV Ruen, which had been seized by Somalian pirates. The cargo vessel was taken near the Yemeni island of Socotra in December 2023 and was located approximately 2,600 km away from the Indian Coast. This successful counter-piracy operation received assistance from the Indian warship INS Subhadra, INS Kolkata, MQ-9B SeaGuardian drones and a P8I maritime patrol aircraft. The “high tempo” mission aboard merchant vessel lasting for about 40 hours concluded by safely evacuating 17 crew members and compelling 35 pirates to surrender.		
26 April 2024	MV Andromeda Star (Panama)	INS Kochi	Missile attack
26 April 2024	INS Kochi rescued 30 persons from a Panama-flagged and Seychelles-operated oil tanker, MV Andromeda Star, which was attacked by Houthi missiles earlier. An official reconnaissance was conducted by a helicopter after which the explosive ordnance disposal (EOD) reached the vessel to "residual risk assessment". Out of 30 crew members, 22 were Indian nationals. Later the ship continued towards her next destination. According to the US Central Command, three anti ship ballistic missiles were launched by Houthis to attack MV Maisha and MV Andromeda Star.		

== 2025 ==
With tensions arising in the middle east following a United States buildup of ships between December 2025 and March 2026, multiple Indian naval assets were deployed across the Persian Gulf, the Red Sea , Southeast Asia and the central Indian Ocean,aimed at boosting naval diplomacy efforts.

== 2026 ==
While the Iran conflict begun, an Indian Navy destroyer and a frigate was kept deployed in the Gulf of Oman and the Gulf of Aden under Operation Sankalp. As on 2 March, India was "closely monitoring" the situation while the warships could be immediately diverted for HADR operations, as per a senior defence official.On 10 March, The New York Times reported that the Indian government was evaluating options to escort the Indian-flagged vessels that were stuck near the crisis-hit Strait of Hormuz. As of then, there were 36–38 such vessels with 1,100 sailors, all of which were safe with the crew members having sufficient provisions. The ships are complying to "enhanced safety protocols" including reporting to authorities at a higher frequency. Indian ship owners had requested to government for naval escorts. .

Unlike the passive monitoring protocols seen in previous years, the Navy implemented close-protection escorts for India-flagged Liquefied petroleum gas (LPG) and crude oil tankers. Through back-channel negotiations led by the National Security Advisor, Ajit Doval, India may have secured an informal guarantee from Tehran for the safe passage of Indian vessels, provided they are escorted by Indian naval assets and do not carry coalition materiel. On 25 March, Operation Urja Suraksha was reported to have been initiated to secure oil supplies from the Middle East to India. The Navy provides critical precise instructions to each ship through the Iran-controlled route, closer to the Iran coast than the official shipping lanes.

India was also among the five nations, including China, Russia, Iraq and Pakistan whose ships were allowed to transit the Strait of Hormuz. This was announced by the Foreign Minister of Iran, Abbas Araghchi on 26 March.

On 27 May, INS Kolkata was deployed for patrols in the Gulf of Aden. The ship immediately launched an operation after suspicious movements around a merchant vessel using its integral helicopter prevented possible piracy incident when MV Mashallah 1 was targeted.

== Achievement ==
Due to the impact made in addressing maritime challenges, preventing the resurgence of piracy, and significantly decreasing drug trafficking in the Indian Ocean Region, as well as in protecting India's maritime concerns, the Indian Navy's strategic response, creativity, and unwavering determination during the continuous maritime security operations under 'Op Sankalp' have garnered international recognition.

By the end of 2023, a total of 41 warships have been deployed by the Indian Navy to provide escort services for around 624 Lakh Tons of cargo carried by 503 Indian Flagged Merchant Vessels.

As of March 2024, the Indian Navy has demonstrated its dedication to guaranteeing the maritime safety and security by escorting about 15,000,000 Tg of vital commodities under transit in the region and has given over 450 merchant vessels confidence from being present in the IOR. It has a remarkable record of saving over 110 lives which includes 45 Indian seafarers. The Indian Navy has apprehended contraband and approximately 3,000 kilograms (6,600 lb) of narcotic drugs.

Around 23 warships has been deployed in the Gulf of Oman and Persian Gulf region as of March 2026.

== See also ==
- Operation Prosperity Guardian
- Operation Aspides
- Operation Atalanta
- 2024 missile strikes in Yemen
