= 2023 attack on the Chem Pluto =

Maritime drone strike

History
- Name: Chem Pluto
- Owner: Rio Brillante
- Operator: Ace Quantum Chemical Tankers
- Port of registry: Monrovia
- Completed: 2012
- Identification: IMO number: 9624770
- Status: active

General characteristics
- Type: Chemical tanker
- Tonnage: 12,226 GT; 21,323 DWT in summer
- Length: 149 m (488 ft 10 in)
- Beam: 24 m (78 ft 9 in)
- Crew: 22

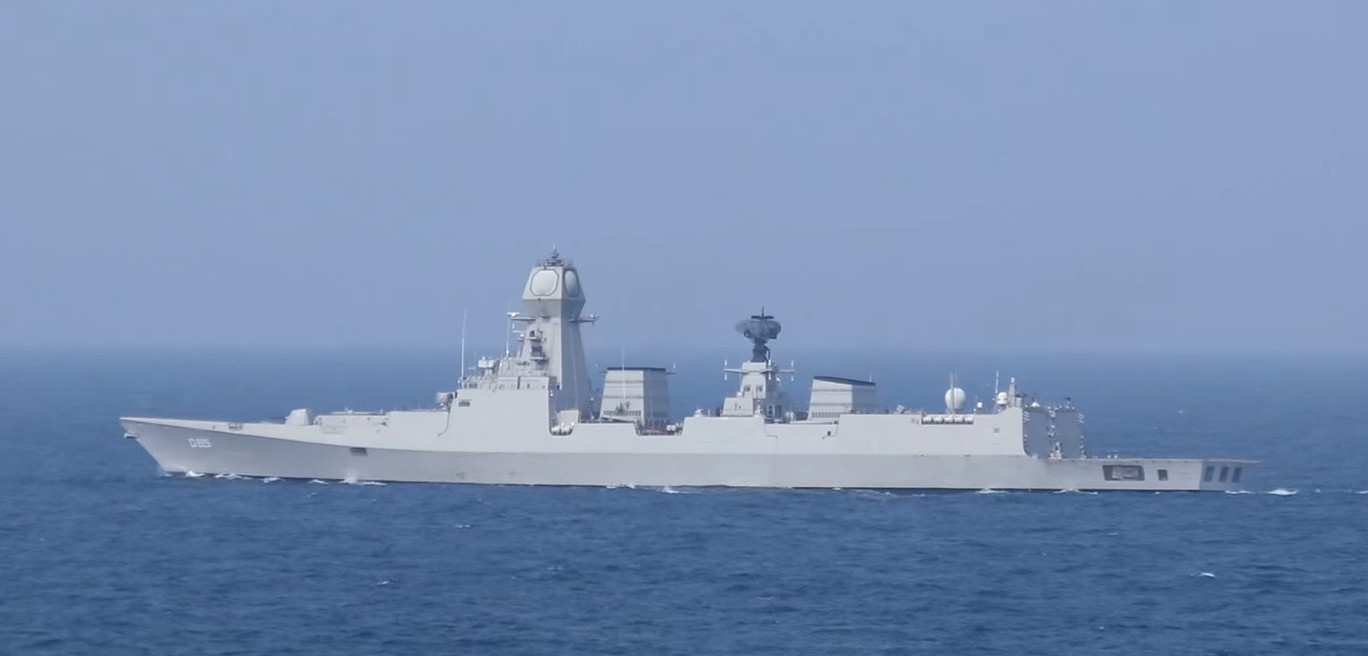
INS Chennai – one of the destroyers which reacted to the attack

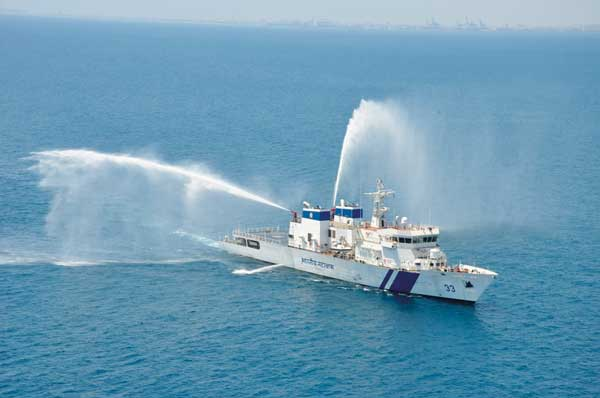
ICGS Vikram – the patrol ship which aided the tanker

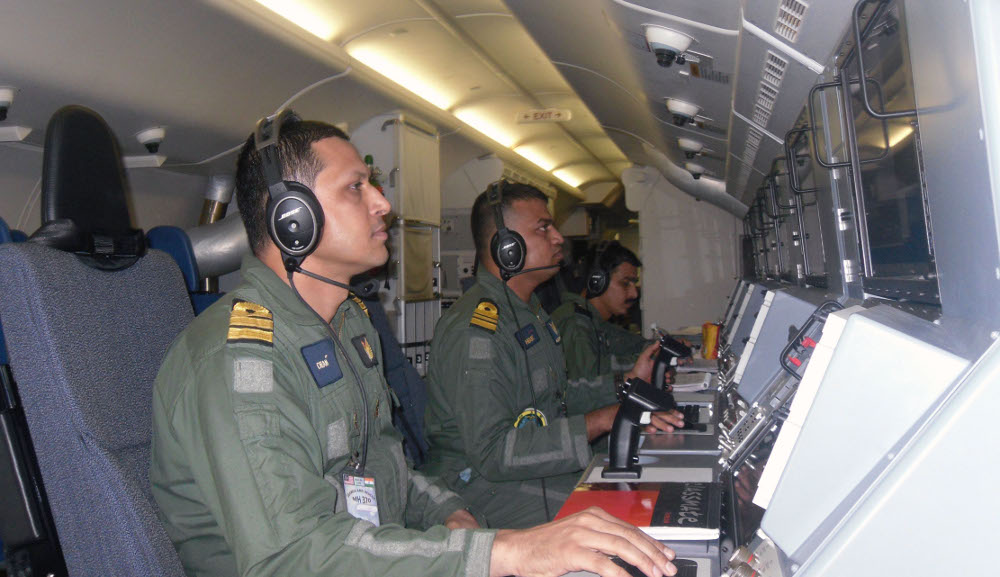
Sensor operators on an Indian P-8I – the type of aircraft patrolling the area

On 23 December 2023, the tanker Chem Pluto was struck by an anti-ship missile or drone while it was carrying oil from Jubail, Saudi Arabia, to New Mangalore Port, India. The strike happened at 10:00 local time (06:00 GMT) when the ship was about 200 miles (320 km) south-west of Veraval.

== Events ==
The missile hit the poop deck and penetrated the hull, causing internal damage, a fire and power failure. There were no casualties in the mostly Indian crew of 22 who were able to control the fire, restore power and get the ship under way again.

The Indian Information Fusion Centre for the Indian Ocean region alerted the Indian Coast Guard who sent the patrol ship ICGS Vikram to assist and escort the tanker while the Indian Navy patrolled with a warship and P-8I maritime aircraft.

The United States Department of Defense announced that this was a direct attack by the Iranian military but the Iranian foreign ministry denied that they were responsible.

The ship is owned by a Japanese company, Rio Brillante, and operated by Ace Quantum Chemical Tankers which is based in the Netherlands and associated with the Israeli billionaire Idan Ofer. The ship was registered in Monrovia to give it a Liberian flag of convenience.

== Reaction ==
The ship docked in Mumbai on Christmas Day for repairs and forensic investigation. The initial investigations were made by the Indian Navy's Explosive Ordinance Disposal team and subsequent analysis by the Central Forensic Science Laboratory in Pune. Fragments recovered from the ship indicated that the missile may have been a HESA Shahed 136 drone. Two Iranian vessels near the attack were boarded and searched by the Indian Navy – bulk carrier Artenos and general cargo ship Saviz – but no evidence of involvement was found.

India reacted by assigning destroyers, including INS Chennai, INS Kochi, INS Kolkata and INS Mormugao, to patrol the shipping lanes of the Indian Ocean, while Prime Minister Modi discussed the incident and Middle East issues with the Crown Prince and Prime Minister of Saudi Arabia, Mohammed bin Salman, and the Prime Minister of Israel, Benjamin Netanyahu.

== See also ==
- Red Sea crisis
- Timeline of the Red Sea crisis
- July 2021 Gulf of Oman incident
- Operation Prosperity Guardian
