= INS Kochi =

Indian Kolkata-class stealth guided-missile destroyer

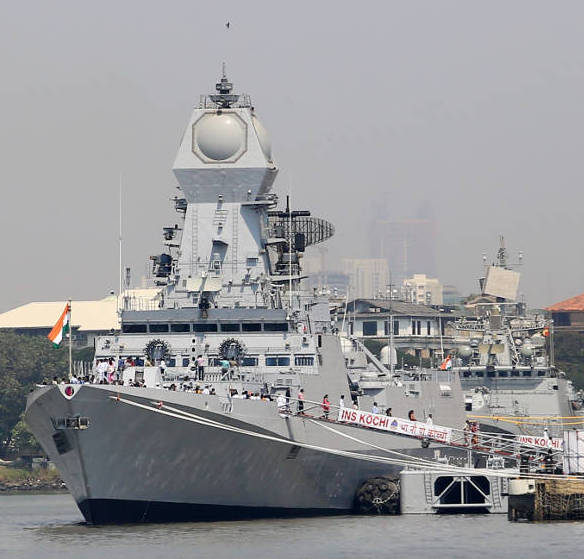
- Commissioning ceremony of INS Kochi at Mazagon Dock Limited, Mumbai.

History

India
- Name: Kochi
- Namesake: Kochi
- Operator: Indian Navy
- Builder: Mazagon Dock Limited
- Laid down: 25 October 2005
- Launched: 18 September 2009
- Commissioned: 30 September 2015
- In service: in active service
- Motto: Jahi Shatrun Mahabaho(Sanskrit) "Oh mighty armed one… conquer the enemy"

General characteristics
- Type: Guided-missile destroyer
- Displacement: 7,400 t (7,300 long tons; 8,200 short tons) full load
- Length: 163 m (534 ft 9 in)
- Beam: 17.4 m (57 ft 1 in)
- Draught: 6.5 m (21 ft 4 in)
- Propulsion: Combined gas and gas system: 4 × Zorya-Mashproekt DT-59 reversible gas turbines producing 16.55MW each
- Speed: 30 knots (56 km/h)
- Range: 6,000 nmi (11,000 km) at 18 kn (33 km/h)
- Complement: 300 (50 officers + 250 sailors)
- Sensors & processing systems: Radar :-; IAI EL/M-2248 MF-STAR S-band AESA multi-function radar; Thales LW-08 D-band air search radar; Garpun Bal (3TS-25E) radar; Sonar :-; BEL HUMSA-NG bow sonar; BEL Nagin active towed array sonar; Combat Suite :-; BEL EMCCA Mk4 combat management system
- Electronic warfare & decoys: BEL Ellora electronic support measures; Decoys :-; 4 × Kavach decoy launchers; 2 × Maareech torpedo-countermeasure systems
- Armament: Anti-air warfare :-; 4 × 8-cell VLS, for a total of 32 Barak 8 surface-to-air missiles; Anti-surface warfare :-; 2 × 8-cell VLS, for 16 BrahMos anti-ship missiles; Anti-submarine warfare :-; 4 × 533 mm (21 in) torpedo tubes; 2 × RBU-6000 anti-submarine rocket launchers; Guns :-; 1 × OTO Melara 76 mm naval gun; 4 x AK-630 CIWS
- Aircraft carried: 2 × Sea King or HAL Dhruv helicopters
- Aviation facilities: Dual Enclosed hangar

INS Kochi (D64) is the second ship of the Kolkata-class stealth guided-missile destroyers built under the code name Project 15A for the Indian Navy. She was constructed by Mazagon Dock Limited (MDL) in Mumbai. After undergoing extensive sea trials, she was commissioned to Indian Navy service on 30 September 2015.

== Construction ==
The keel of Kochi was laid on 25 October 2005. In keeping with the tradition of the Navy, the warship was launched by Madhulika Verma, wife of Chief of Naval Staff, Admiral Nirmal Kumar Verma, at 11.20 a.m. 18 September 2009 from the Mazagon Dock in Mumbai. For the first time, Mazagon Docks used a "pontoon assisted" launching method in collaboration with the Russian firm Baltiysky Zavod. Under this method, pontoons are welded to the hull, which give buoyancy and helps overcome tidal constraints. Mazagon plans to use this method for all future ship launches, as the process makes it possible to launch ships with much higher weight.

=== Weapon trials ===
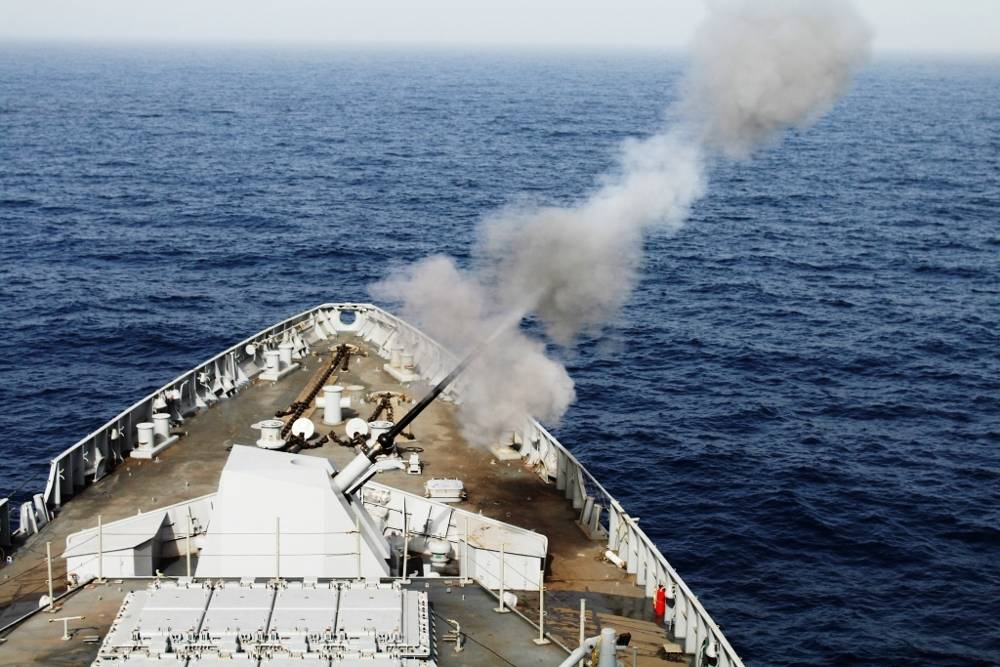
Gun firing trials of INS Kochi

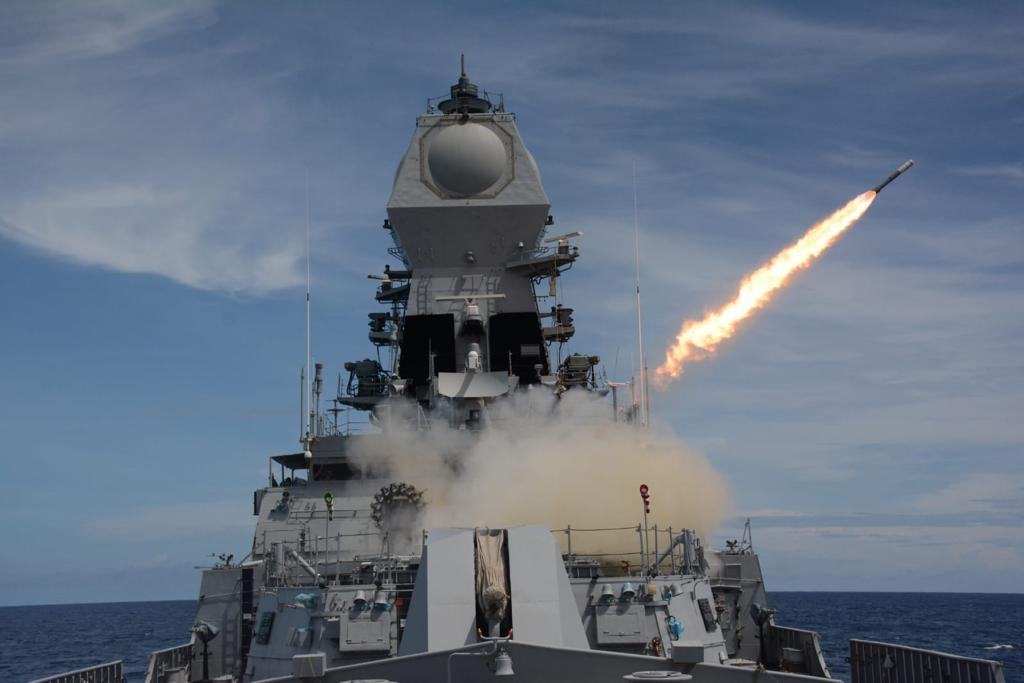
Missile firing trials of INS Kochi

On 1 November 2015, the Navy successfully test-fired the BrahMos supersonic cruise missile from Kochi. The missile hit its target, decommissioned minesweeper INS Alleppey (M65), with almost pinpoint accuracy during this first-ever vertical launch from the 7,500-tonne Kochi.

On 16 May and 29 November 2017, the Navy successfully test fired the Barak 8 missiles from Kochi.

== Design ==
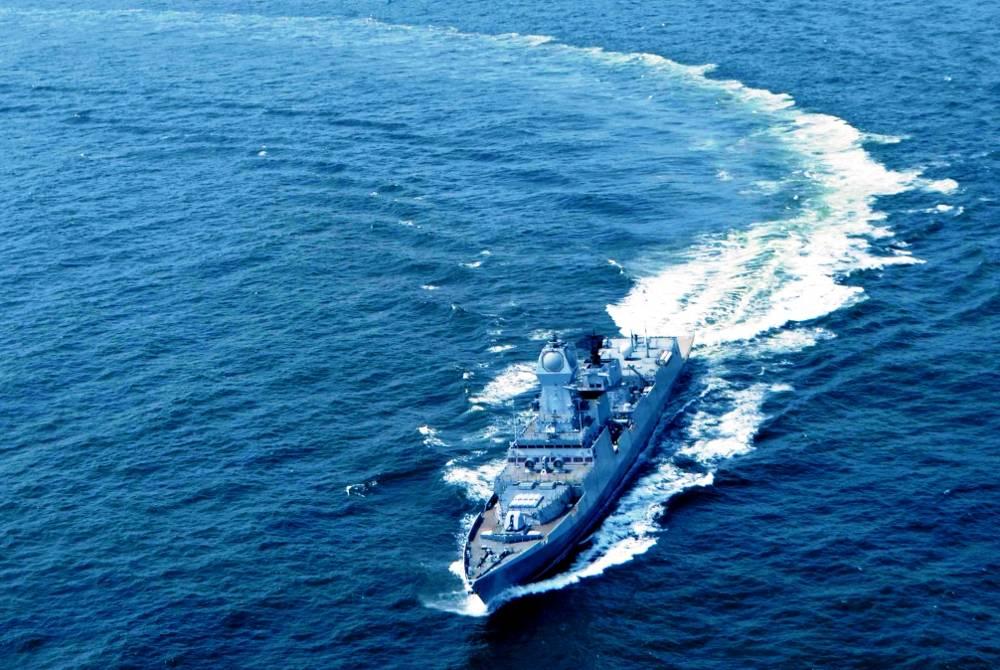
INS Kochi during sea trials

At the time of its commissioning, INS Kochi was the largest India-made warship, before being later surpassed by the Aircraft Carrier INS Vikrant which, coincidentally was also made in the Cochin Shipyards. The warship is designed by the Navy's in-house organisation, Directorate of Naval Design. It has displacement of 7,500 tons and it is 164 metres (538 ft) in length and 17 metres (56 ft) at the beam and is propelled by four gas turbines and designed to achieve speeds in excess of 30 knots (56 km/h). The ship has built with advanced stealth features which have been achieved through shaping of hull and use of radar-transparent deck fittings. A bow mounted sonar dome, the second of its kind in an indigenous naval platform, has been introduced to enhance sonar acoustic performance. The ship has a complement of about 40 officers and 350 sailors. INS Kochi use AC 14 anchor. it use 5ac of 600 tons.

== Service History ==
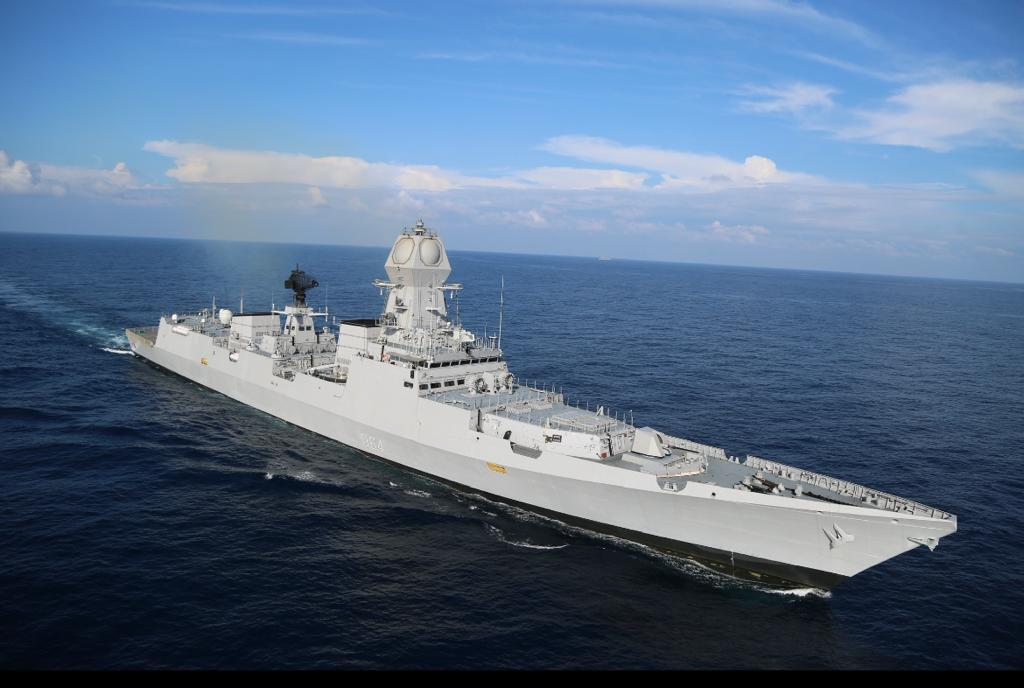
INS Kochi

=== Cooperative Engagement Capability through Joint Taskforce Coordination (JTC) mode ===
On 15 May 2019, INS Chennai along with INS Kochi participated in the maiden cooperative engagement firing through the employment of the full Joint Taskforce Coordination (JTC) mode which implements the MRSAM / Barak 8 ‘Cooperative Engagement’ operating mode.

INS Kochi participated in the 'Zayed Talwar 2021' bilateral exercise with the United Arab Emirates Navy's Baynunah-class guided missile corvette UAES Al-Dhafra on 7 August 2021, off the coast of Abu Dhabi. The ships undertook tactical manoeuvres, Over the Horizon Targeting, Search and Rescue and Electronic Warfare exercises, with extensive use of helicopters. Less than a week later, Kochi arrived at Al Jubail for the Indian Navy's maiden naval exercise with the Royal Saudi Navy, 'Al-Mohed Al-Hindi'. The drill was meant for deeper understanding of each other's operational practices.

=== Operation Sankalp: 2023-24 Anti-piracy patrols ===
Against the backdrop of the increasing attacks on commercial ships transiting the Red Sea, the Gulf of Aden, and the Arabian Sea by the end of 2023, the Indian Navy on 31 December 2023 said it had substantially enhanced maritime surveillance efforts in Central and North Arabian Sea and "augmented force levels" by primarily deploying the P-8I Neptune MPA and the SeaGuardian drones. Following two merchant vessels, including MV Ruen and MV Chem Pluto which were targeted in the sea. MV Ruen was hijacked (later rescued by INS Kolkata) while MV Chem Pluto sustained drone hits eventually and making way to port, The Indian Navy deployed a large flotilla of destroyers to safeguard international security. The deployment into the Arabian Sea includes Navy's missile destroyers, including INS Kolkata, INS Kochi, INS Mormugao, INS Chennai and INS Visakhapatnam, virtually all of its modern destroyer force of its Western Fleet. The INS Kolkata is deployed on the mouth of the Red Sea, INS Kochi on the south of Yemen's Socotra Island, INS Mormugao in the west Arabian Sea with INS Chennai in the central Arabian Sea.

INS Visakhapatnam was also moved in a week later and was tasked to patrol the North Arabian Sea.

Having been the first ship posted, and already patrolling the waters since early December, INS Kochi was involved most in action, and directly led to more ships coming on the scene.

On 15 December 2023, the cargo ship MV Reun was attacked and hijacked by Somali pirates in their first attempt since 2017. Among the first responders were the Indian Navy. Following Indian Navy P-8I Neptune Maritime Patrol aircraft locating those ships, Kochi as well as the Spanish ship Victoria and the Japanese destroyer Akenebono immediately sailed behind them and are proceeding to Mogadishu harbour in Somalia, the estimated location of the pirates are taking the Reun. INS Kochi, on its part, was shadowing MV Ruen in a “wait-and-watch” mode since a direct intervention could have led to casualties among the crew being held hostage by the pirates.

On 19 December, the hijackers freed a Bulgarian hostage so that he could receive medical assistance after having injuries from an unknown cause. The Times of India later reported that it was a gunshot wound. The sailor was treated on board and is now being taken to a shore-based medical facility in Oman for further evaluation. The destroyer kept trailing MV Reun and further action will be decided by the owners of the shipping company. As of 19 December 2023, the negotiations are still ongoing and Kochi has returned to her patrol point.

On 26 April 2024, INS Kochi rescued 30 persons from a Panama-flagged and Seychelles-operated oil tanker, MV Andromeda Star, which was attacked by Houthi missiles earlier (Red Sea Crisis). An official reconnaissance was conducted by a helicopter after which the explosive ordnance disposal (EOD) reached the vessel to "residual risk assessment". Out of 30 crew members, 22 were Indian nationals. Later the ship continued towards her next destination. According to the US Central Command, three anti ship ballistic missiles were launched by Houthis to attack MV Maisha and MV Andromeda Star.

INS Kochi made a visit to Malé, Maldives, to deliver the ship CGS Huravee, which had undergone refit in Mumbai the previous month.

== See also ==
- INS Kolkata - Sister ship and first of the class.
- INS Chennai - Sister ship and third of the class.
