= INS Chennai =

Third Kolkata class Stealth guided missile destroyer of the Indian Navy

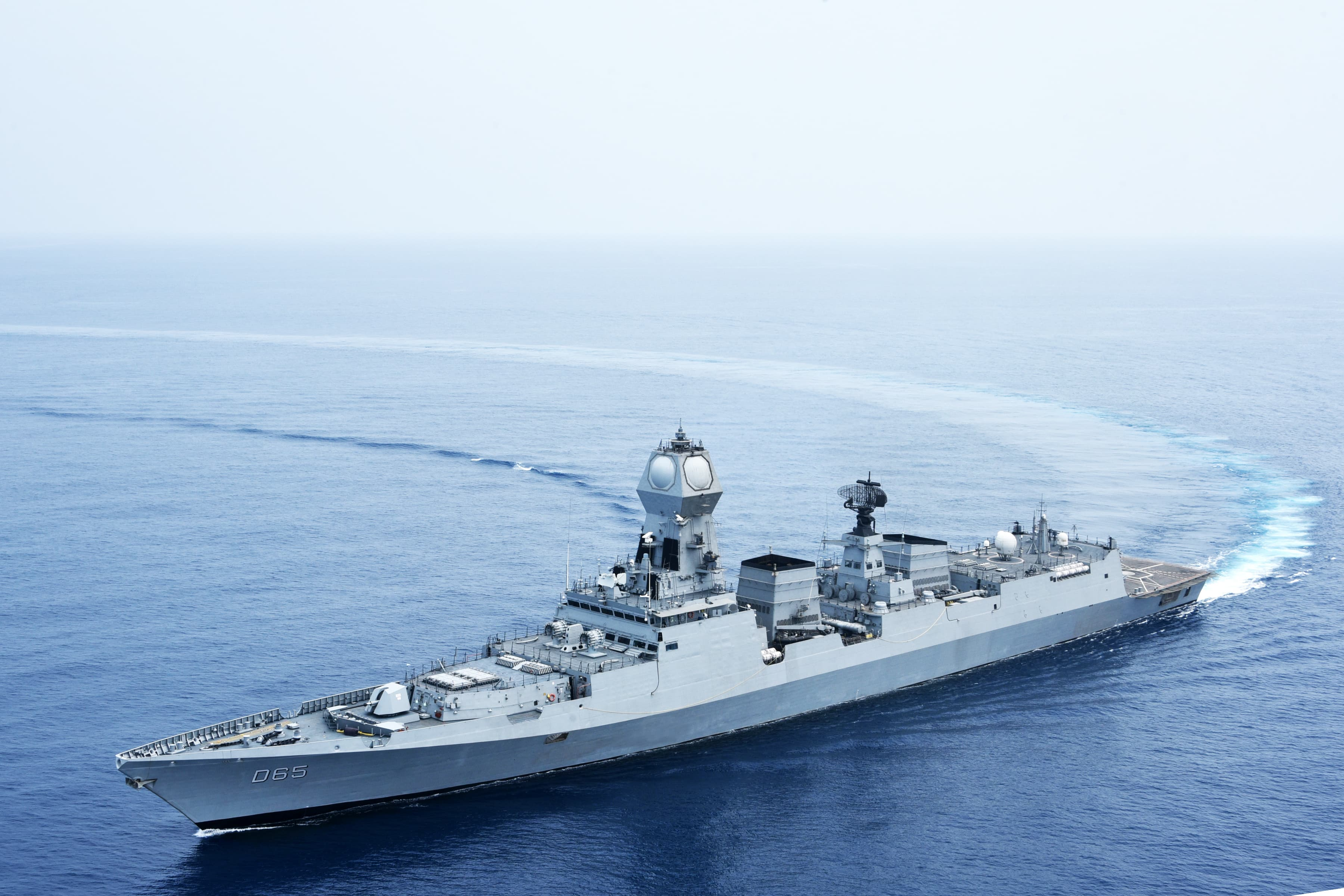
- Chennai (D65) at sea.

History

India
- Name: Chennai
- Namesake: Chennai
- Operator: Indian Navy
- Builder: Mazagon Dock Limited
- Laid down: February 2006
- Launched: 1 April 2010
- Completed: 12 November 2015
- Commissioned: 21 Nov 2016
- Motto: Shatro Sanharaka ("Vanquisher of Enemies")
- Status: In active service

General characteristics
- Type: Guided-missile destroyer
- Displacement: 7,400 t (7,300 long tons; 8,200 short tons) full load
- Length: 163 m (534 ft 9 in)
- Beam: 17.4 m (57 ft 1 in)
- Draught: 6.5 m (21 ft 4 in)
- Propulsion: Combined gas and gas system: 4 × Zorya-Mashproekt DT-59 reversible gas turbines producing 16.55MW each
- Speed: 30 knots (56 km/h)
- Range: 6,000 nmi (11,000 km) at 18 kn (33 km/h)
- Complement: 300 (50 officers + 250 sailors)
- Sensors & processing systems: Radar :-; IAI EL/M-2248 MF-STAR S-band AESA multi-function radar; Thales LW-08 D-band air search radar; Garpun Bal (3TS-25E) radar; Sonar :-; BEL HUMSA-NG bow sonar; BEL Nagin active towed array sonar; Combat Suite :-; BEL EMCCA Mk4 combat management system
- Electronic warfare & decoys: BEL Ellora electronic support measures; Decoys :-; 4 × Kavach decoy launchers; 2 × Maareech torpedo-countermeasure systems
- Armament: Anti-air warfare :-; 4 × 8-cell VLS, for a total of 32 Barak 8 surface-to-air missiles; Anti-surface warfare :-; 2 × 8-cell VLS, for 16 BrahMos anti-ship missiles; Anti-submarine warfare :-; 4 × 533 mm (21 in) torpedo tubes; 2 × RBU-6000 anti-submarine rocket launchers; Guns :-; 1 × OTO Melara 76 mm naval gun; 4 x AK-630 CIWS
- Aircraft carried: 2 × Sea King or HAL Dhruv helicopters
- Aviation facilities: Dual Enclosed hangar

INS Chennai (D65) is the third and last ship of the Kolkata-class stealth guided missile destroyers of the Indian Navy. She was constructed by the Mazagon Dock Shipbuilders (MDL) at Mumbai. On 17 April 2017, INS Chennai was dedicated to the city of Chennai in the presence of then Chief Minister of Tamil Nadu, K. Palaniswamy.

INS Chennai has on her seal a Bull symbolising the Jallikattu festival celebrated in Tamil Nadu from where the ship associates its heritage.

== Construction ==
She was laid down in February 2006, and was launched on 2 April 2010 by the then Defence Minister AK Antony's wife Elizabeth Antony at a function in Mumbai, and was commissioned on 21 November 2016 by the Indian Defence Minister Manohar Parrikar. INS Chennai is the first naval ship named after Chennai, capital city of the state of Tamil Nadu, India. Captain C. R. Praveen Nair was the commissioning commanding officer.

== Features ==
The India-designed ship is designed to have state of the art weapons and sensors, stealth features, an advanced action information system, a comprehensive auxiliary control system, world class modular living spaces, sophisticated power distribution system and a host of other advanced features. These ships integrate many new features and involve design changes that ensure a far more advanced weapons platforms compared to the earlier Project 15 ships.

The ship's air defence capability, designed to counter the threat of enemy aircraft and anti-ship cruise missiles, revolve around the vertical launch, long range surface-to-air missile system, co-developed by DRDO.

Four AK-630 rapid-fire guns will provide the ship with close-in-defence capability while an MR gun will enable her to provide effective naval gunfire support.

India-developed twin tube torpedo launchers and rocket launchers will add punch to the ship's anti-submarine capability.

INS Chennai is designed to carry the supersonic BrahMos surface-to-surface missile system. The system enables the ship to engage shore-based and naval surface targets at long range making it a lethal platform for strike against enemy targets.

== Service History ==
INS Chennai, along with INS Sunayna was sent to the Persian Gulf and Gulf of Oman in June 2019 to protect Indian shipping interests amid tensions in the Strait of Hormuz.

=== Cooperative Engagement Capability ===
On 15 May 2019, INS Chennai along with INS Kochi participated in the maiden cooperative engagement firing through the employment of the full Joint Taskforce Coordination (JTC) mode which implements the MRSAM / Barak 8 'Cooperative Engagement' operating mode. The maiden tests of indigenous Extended Range Anti-Submarine Rockets were conducted on INS Chennai on 3 April 2023.

=== Operation Sankalp: 2023-24 anti-piracy patrols ===
Against the backdrop of the increasing attacks on commercial ships transiting the Red Sea, the Gulf of Aden, and the Arabian Sea by the end of 2023, the Indian Navy stated on 31 December 2023, that it had substantially enhanced maritime surveillance efforts in Central and North Arabian Sea by deploying the P-8I Neptune MPA and the SeaGuardian drones. Following attacks on two merchant vessels, MV Ruen and MV Chem Pluto, anti piracy patrols were enhanced with a naval task force. MV Ruen was hijacked (later rescued by INS Kolkata), while MV Chem Pluto sustained drone hits and made it into Indian waters. The Indian Navy deployed a large flotilla of destroyers to safeguard international security including INS Kolkata, INS Kochi, INS Mormugao, INS Chennai and INS Visakhapatnam. The INS Kolkata is deployed in the Red Sea, INS Kochi is deployed by the south of Yemen's Socotra Island, INS Mormugao is in the west Arabian Sea with INS Chennai in the central Arabian Sea. INS Visakhapatnam was also moved to patrol the north Arabian Sea.

On 4 January 2024, the cargo vessel MV Lila Norfolk sailing from Port Du Aco in Brazil and bound for Khalifa Bin Salman in Bahrain was hijacked by pirates 460 nautical miles east off Somalia. It had sent a message indicating boarding by around five to six unknown armed personnel. Of the 21 crew members, 15 were Indian and the other 6 hailed from the Philippines. INS Chennai was deployed to render assistance while a maritime patrol aircraft overflew the vessel the next morning and established contact with the vessel. On 5 January 2024, after providing warnings, the MARCOS commandos from the INS Chennai boarded the ship to rescue all crew members. The pirates had abandoned ship prior to the boarding.

Following a lengthy patrol, Chennai returned to the Port of Chennai on 16 February to participate in exercise MILAN 2024.

=== IFR-2026 ===
INS Chennai participated at the International Fleet Review 2026 held at Visakapatanam.

== Gallery ==
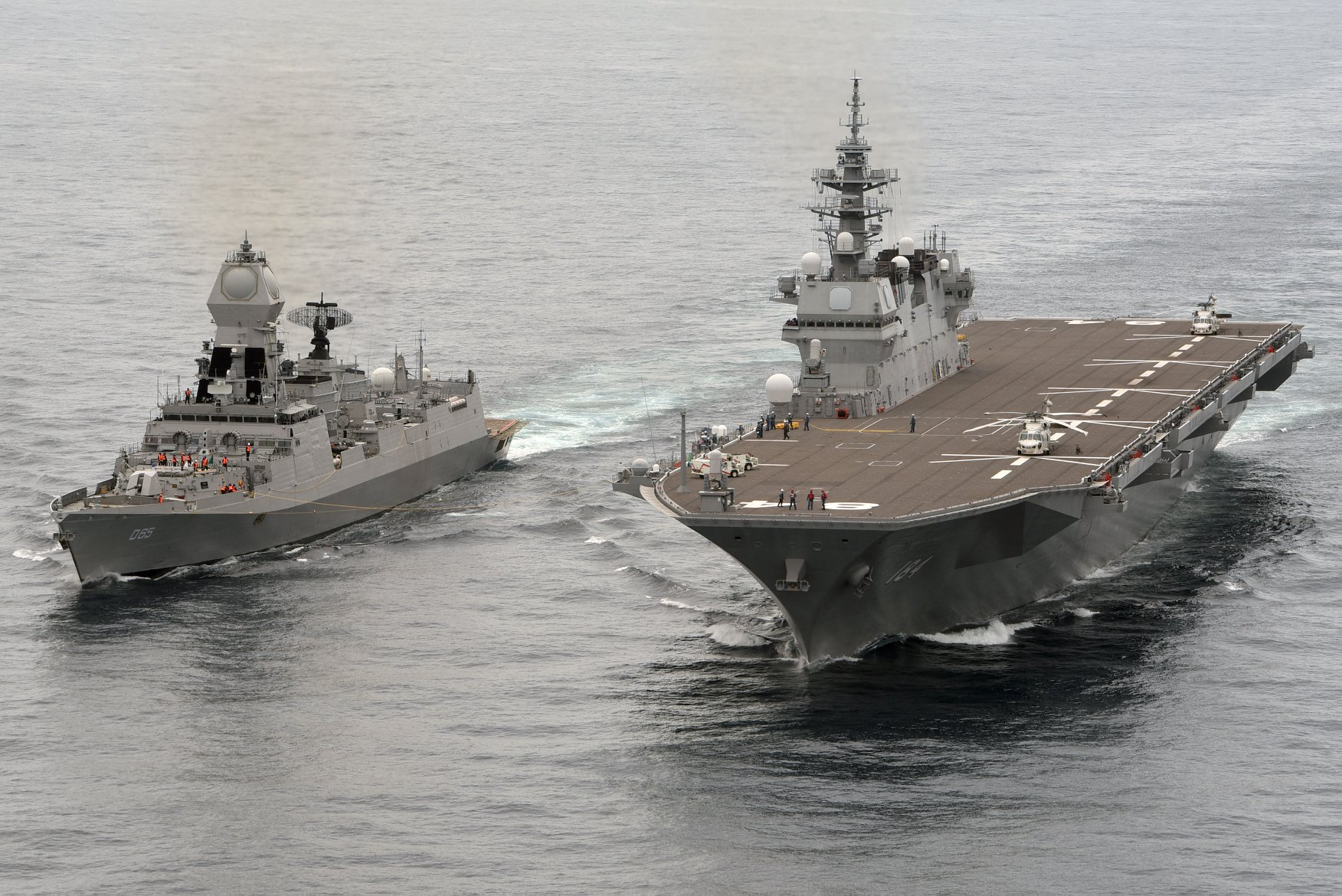
INS Chennai (D65) with JMSDF JS Kaga during JIMEX 2020.

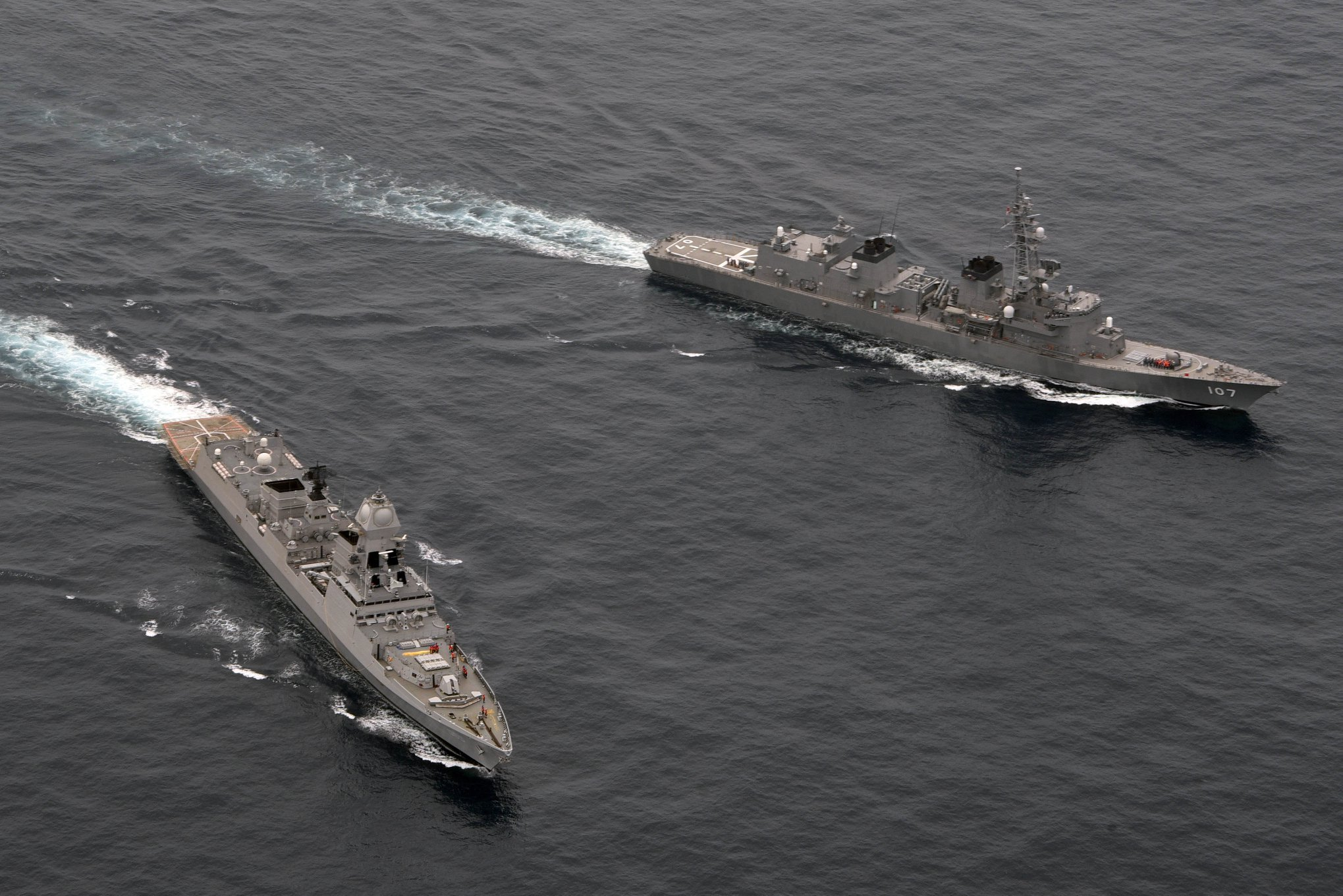
INS Chennai (D65) with JS Ikazuchi (DD-107) during JIMEX 2020.

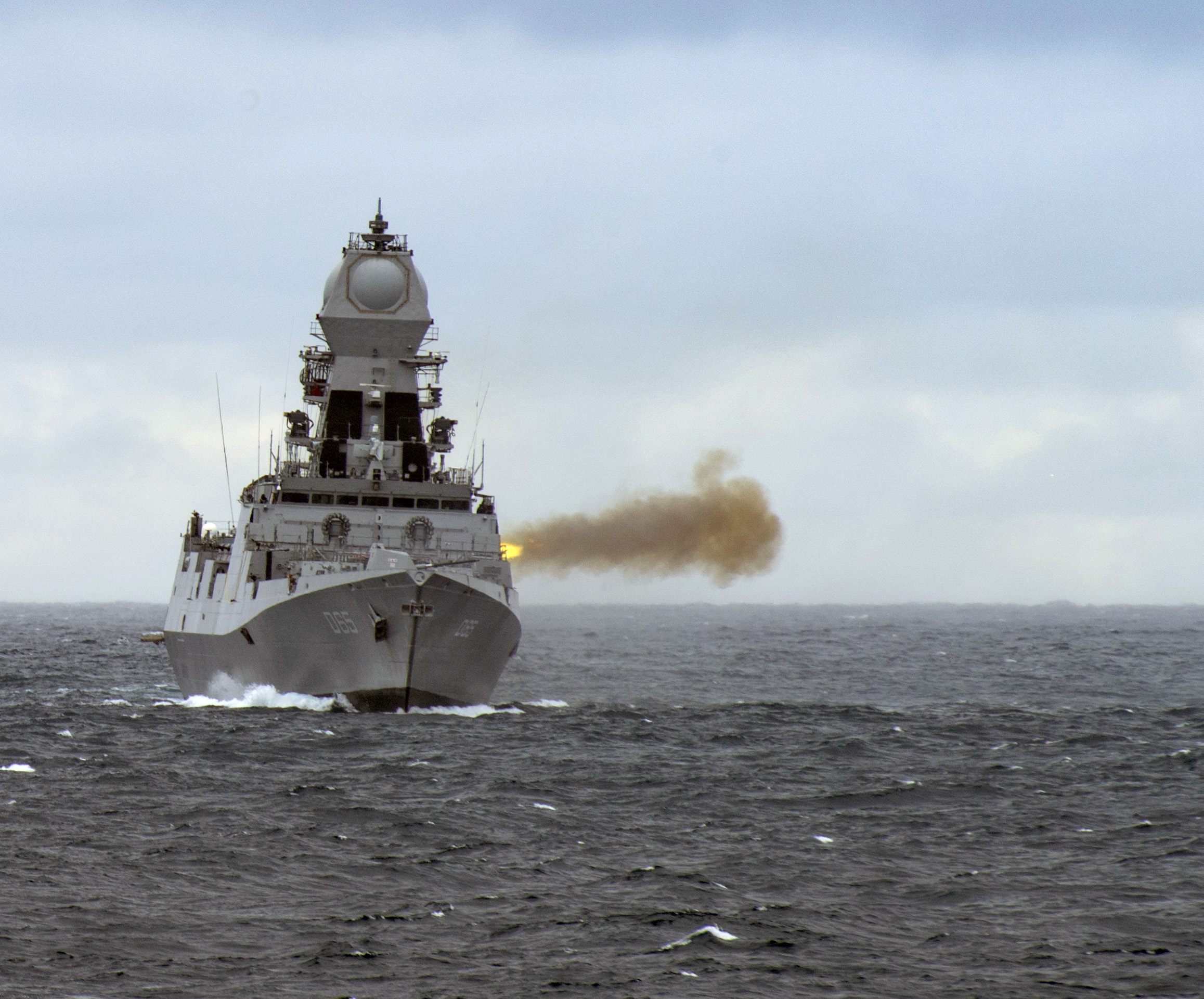
INS Chennai (D65) fires its weapons during Malabar 2020.

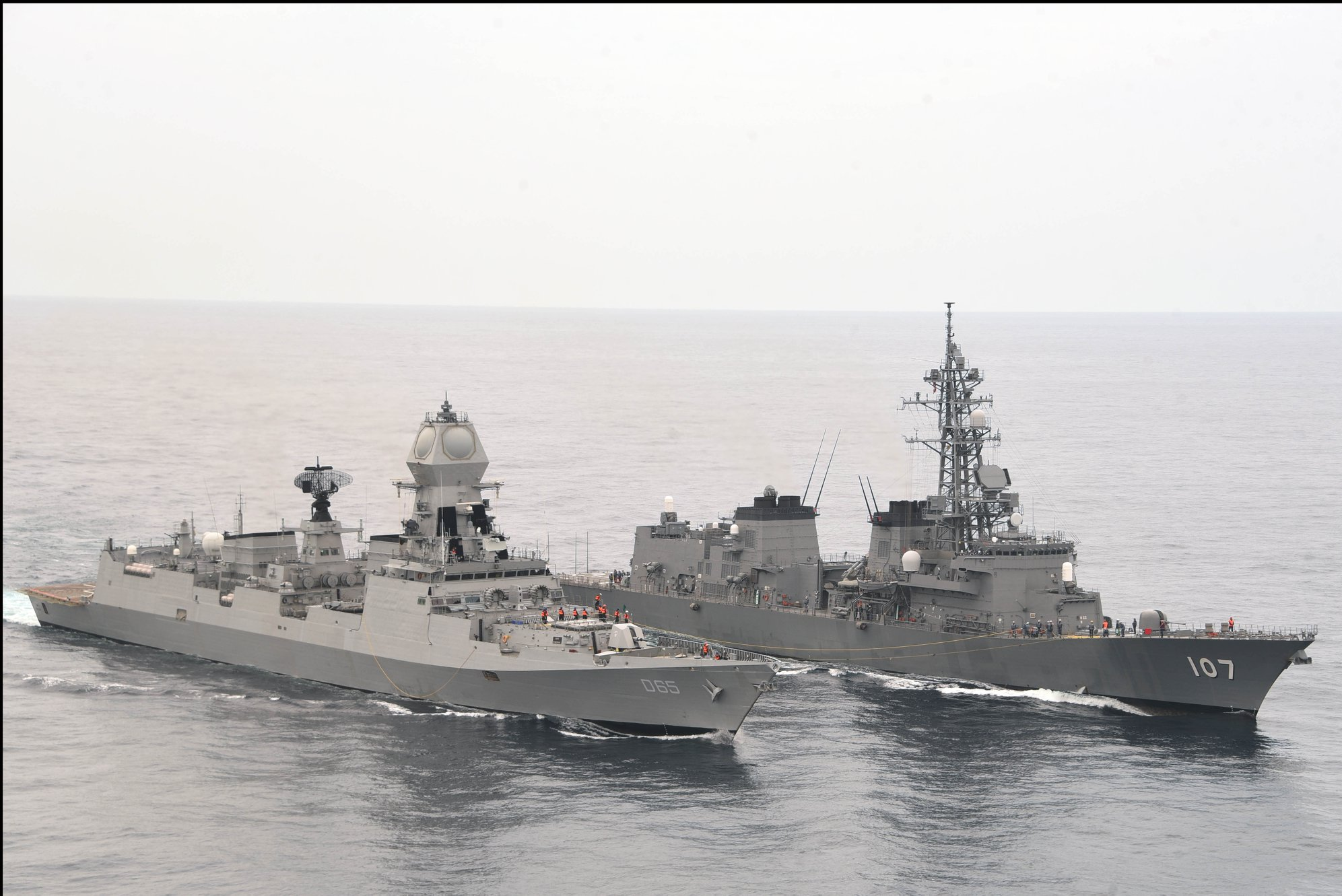
INS Chennai (D65) with JS Ikazuchi during JIMEX 2020.

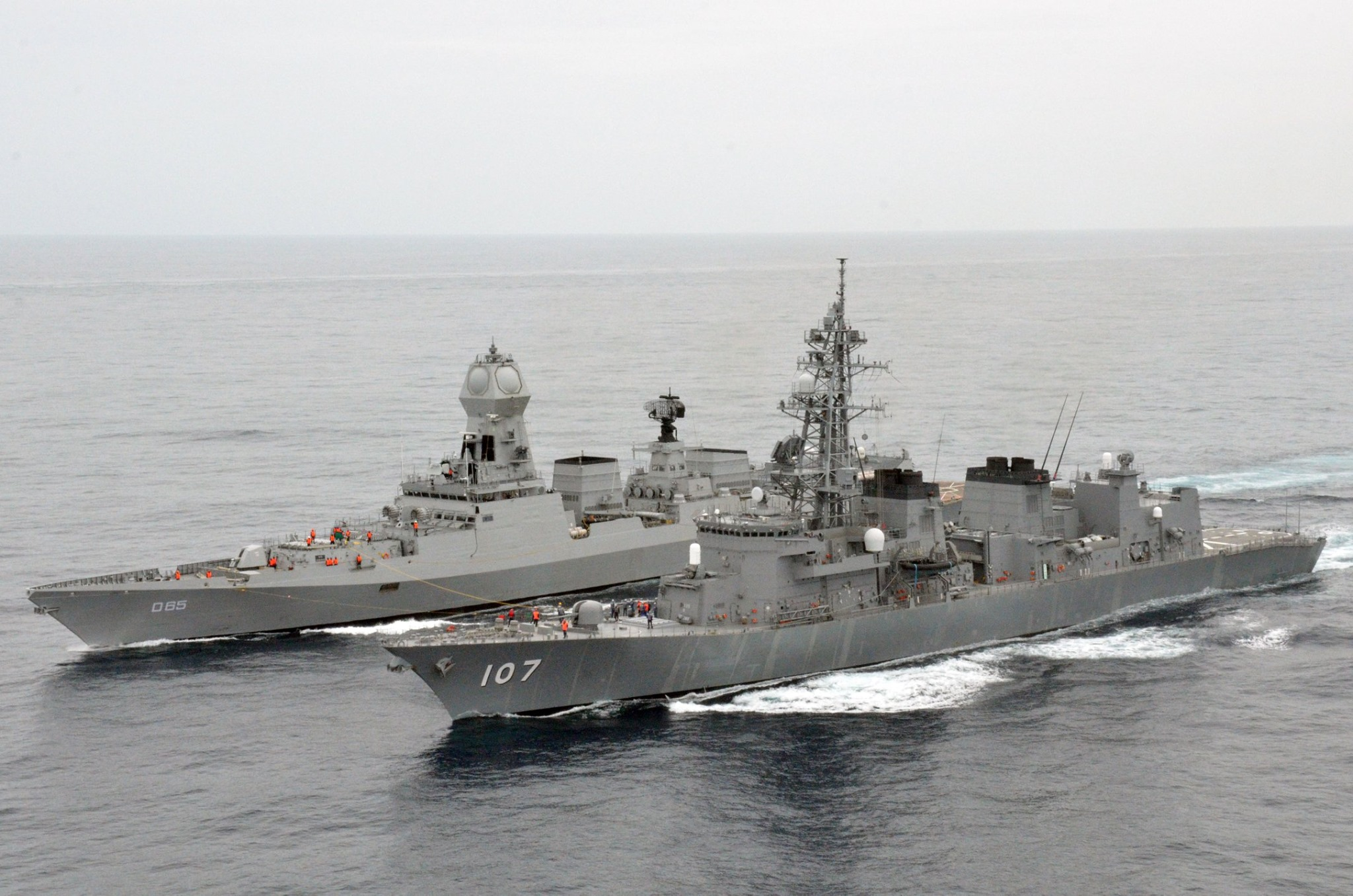
INS Chennai (D65) with JS Ikazuchi.

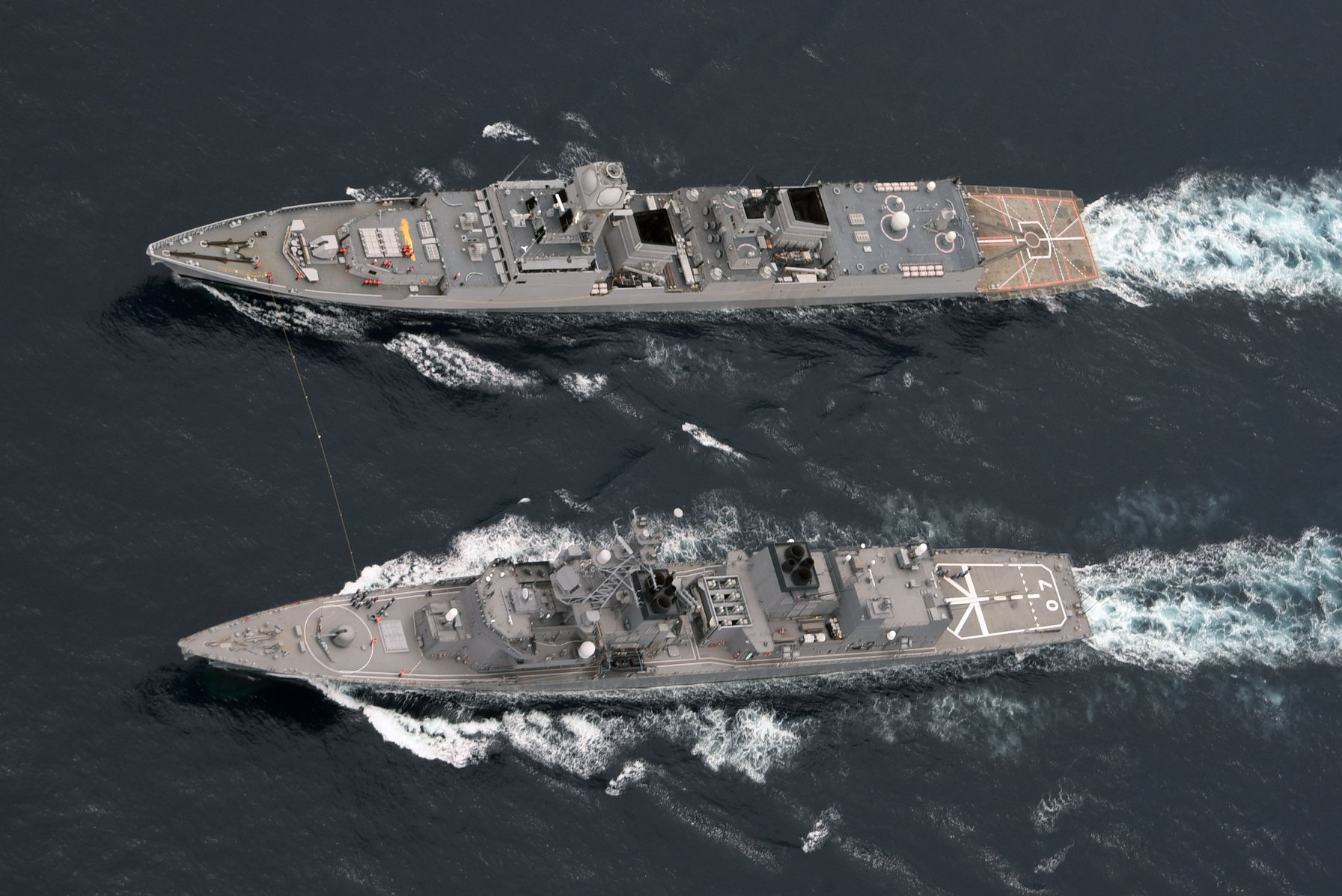
INS Chennai (D65) with JS Ikazuchi during JIMEX 2020 - Top view.

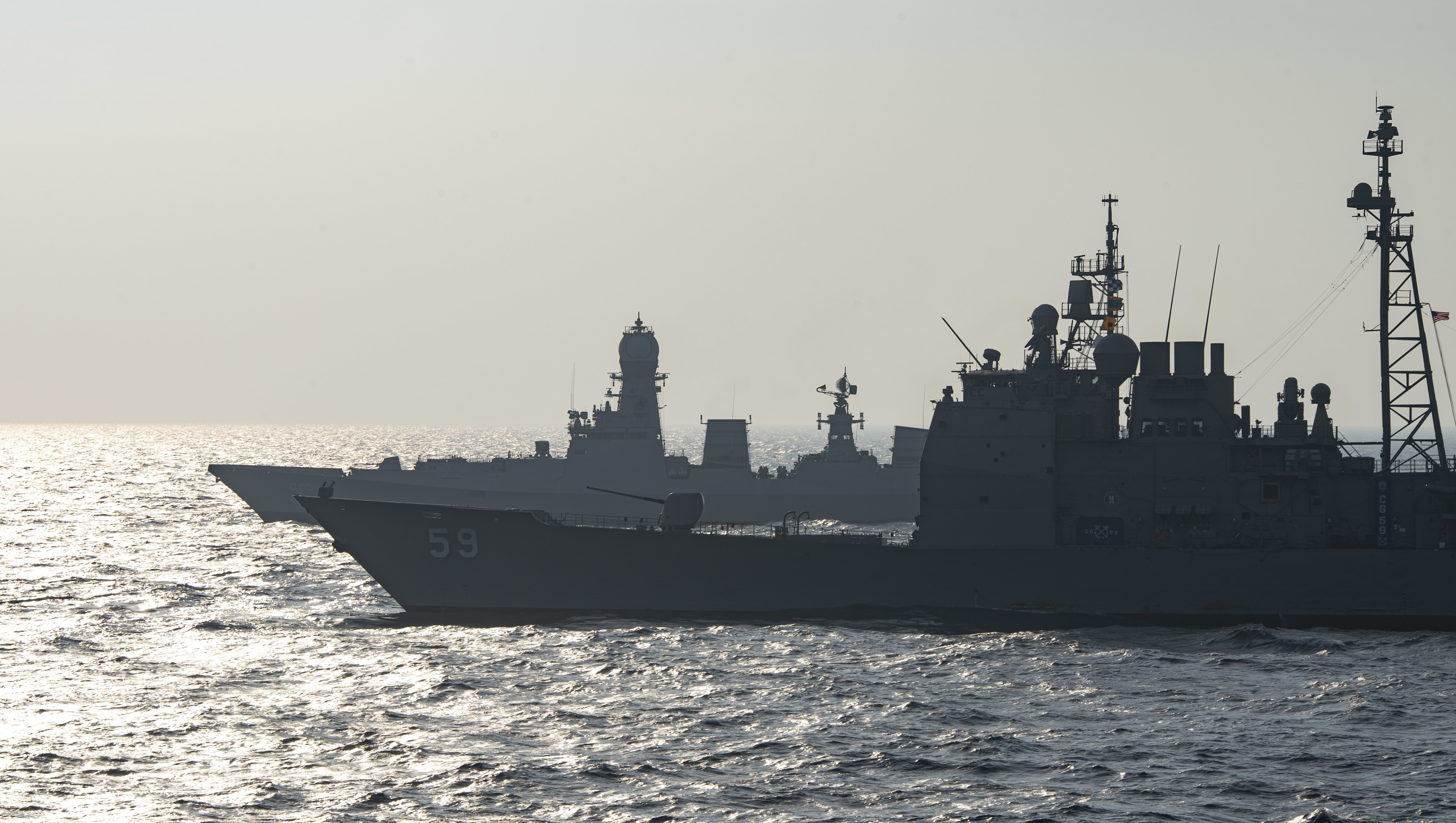
INS Chennai steams alongside the USS Princeton (CG-59) in the North Arabian Sea during Malabar 2020 exercise.

== See also ==
- INS Kolkata - Sister ship and first of the class.
- INS Kochi - Sister ship and second of the class.
- HMIS Madras (J237)
