= HMS Calcutta =

Five ships of the Royal Navy have been named HMS Calcutta, after the Indian city of Calcutta (now Kolkata).

- The first HMS Calcutta (1795) was a 54-gun fourth rate, originally the East Indiaman Warley and purchased in 1795, captured by the French in 1805 and destroyed by British ships in 1809.
- The second HMS Calcutta (1831) was an 84-gun second rate launched in 1831, converted to a gunnery training ship in 1865 and sold in 1908.
- The third HMS Calcutta (1868) was the former battleship Hercules, renamed in 1909.
- The fourth Calcutta was the gunboat HMS Handy, renamed Calcutta in 1916.
- The fifth HMS Calcutta (D82) was a light cruiser launched in 1918 and sunk in action in 1941.

== See also ==
- INS Kolkata
