= INS Visakhapatnam =

Indian Navy guided-missile destroyer

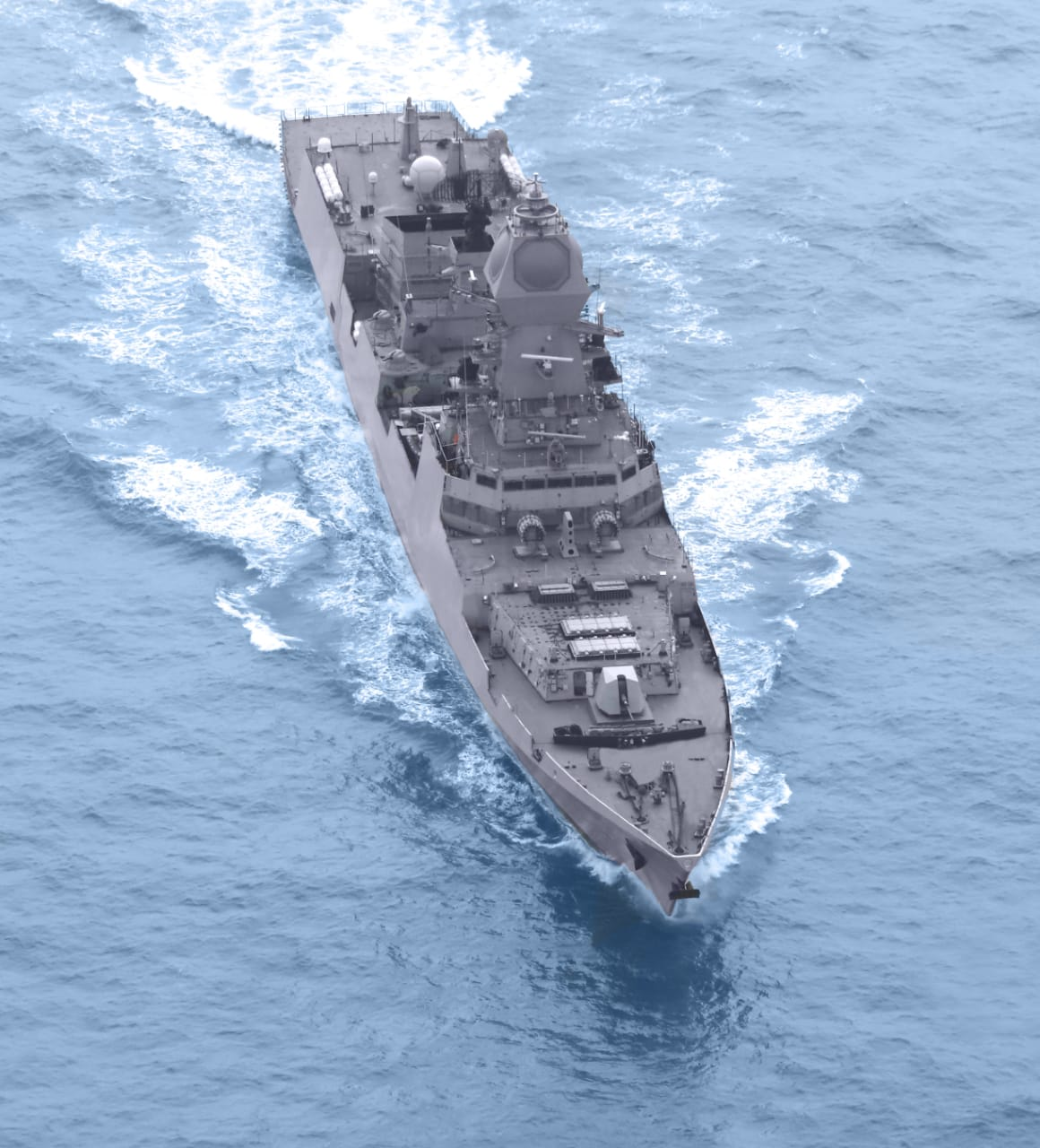
- Visakhapatnam (D66) during her sea trials

History

India
- Name: INS Visakhapatnam
- Namesake: Visakhapatnam
- Owner: Indian Navy
- Operator: Indian Navy
- Builder: Mazagon Dock Limited
- Cost: Around ₹9,000 crore ($1.2 Billion)
- Yard number: 12704
- Way number: D66
- Laid down: 12 October 2013
- Launched: 20 April 2015
- Acquired: 28 October 2021
- Commissioned: 21 November 2021
- Identification: Pennant number: D66
- Motto: यशो लभस्व - Attain Glory
- Nickname(s): The Brave Buck
- Status: In Service
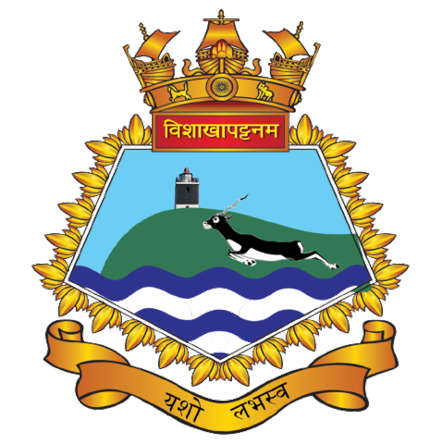
- Badge

General characteristics
- Type: Guided missile destroyer
- Displacement: 7,400 t (7,300 long tons; 8,200 short tons)
- Length: 163 m (535 ft)
- Beam: 17.4 m (57 ft)
- Draft: 6.5 m (21 ft)
- Propulsion: COGAG; 2 x Zorya M36E gas turbines, with 4 × DT-59 reversible gas turbines and 2 × RG-54 gearboxes; 2 × Bergen/GRSE KVM-diesel engines, 9,900 hp (7,400 kW) each; 4 × 1 MWe Wärtsilä WCM-1000 generator sets driving Cummins KTA50G3 engines and Kirloskar 1 MW AC generators
- Speed: In excess of 30 knots (56 km/h)
- Range: 8,000 nautical miles (15,000 km; 9,200 mi) at 18 knots (33 km/h; 21 mph)
- Endurance: 45 days
- Boats & landing craft carried: 4 x RHIB
- Crew: 300 (50 officers + 250 sailors)
- Sensors & processing systems: Radar :-; IAI EL/M-2248 MF-STAR S-Band AESA radar; BEL RAWL-02/LW-08 L-Band air-search radar; Terma/Tata Scanter-6002 X-Band surface-search radar; Sonar :-; BEL HUMSA-NG active/passive sonar; BEL "Nagin" active towed-array sonar; Combat Suite :-; "Combat Management System" (CMS)
- Electronic warfare & decoys: DRDO "Shakti" EW suite (equipped with ESM/ECM and "Radar Finger Printing System" (RFPS)); DRDO "Nayan" COMINT suite; Decoys :-; 4 x Kavach decoy launchers; 2 x Maareech torpedo-countermeasure systems
- Armament: Anti-air warfare :-; 4 × 8-cell VLS, for a total of 32 Barak 8 surface-to-air missiles; Anti-surface warfare :-; 2 x 8-cell VLS, for 16 BrahMos anti-ship missiles; Anti-submarine warfare :-; 4 × 533 mm (21 in) torpedo tubes; 2 × RBU-6000 anti-submarine rocket launchers; Guns :-; 1 × OTO Melara 76 mm naval gun; 4 × AK-630M CIWS; 2 × OFT 12.7 mm M2 Stabilized Remote Controlled Gun
- Aircraft carried: 2 × HAL Dhruv (or) Sea King Mk. 42B
- Aviation facilities: Enclosed helicopter hangar and flight deck capable of accommodating two multi-role helicopters.
- Notes: Modified derivative of the Kolkata-class destroyer.

INS Visakhapatnam is the lead ship and the first of the Visakhapatnam-class stealth guided-missile destroyers of the Indian Navy. The ship, commissioned on 21 November 2021, is one of the largest destroyers in service with the Indian Navy.

== Construction ==
The keel of Visakhapatnam was laid down on 12 October 2013 and she was launched on 20 April 2015 at Mazagon Dock Limited of Mumbai. This was made under Make In India initiative. The ship steering and stabiliser system was manufactured by Larsen & Toubro and hydraulics by Polyhydron Systems..

During Navy Day 2020, Chief of the Naval Staff announced that INS Visakhapatnam has started its sea trials.

=== Commissioning ===
Visakhapatnam was delivered to the Indian Navy on 28 October 2021 and commissioned on 21 November 2021 by Defence Minister Rajnath Singh at the Indian Navy's Western Naval Command, headquartered in Mumbai.

== Service history ==
On 11 January 2022, Visakhapatnam successfully fired an advanced variant of Brahmos missile in sea-to-sea mode validating its new extended range variant and various improvements in missile subsystems.

=== 2023-24 Anti-piracy patrols ===
Against the backdrop of the increasing attacks on commercial ships transiting the Red Sea, the Gulf of Aden, and the Arabian Sea by the end of 2023, the Indian Navy on December 31, 2023, said it had substantially enhanced maritime surveillance efforts in Central and North Arabian Sea and “augmented force levels” by primarily deploying the P-8I Neptune MPA and the SeaGuardian drones . Following two merchant vessels, including MV Ruen and MV Chem Pluto which were targeted in the sea. Ruen was hijacked (later rescued by INS Kolkata) while MV Chem Pluto sustained drone hits eventually and making way to port, The Indian Navy deployed a large flotilla of destroyers to safeguard international security . The deployment into the Arabian Sea includes Navy's missile destroyers, including INS Kolkata, INS Kochi, INS Mormugao, INS Chennai and INS Visakhapatnam, virtually all of its modern destroyer force of its western fleet. INS Kolkata is deployed on the mouth of the Red Sea, INS Kochi on the south of Yemen's Socotra Island, INS Mormugao in the west Arabian Sea with INS Chennai in the central Arabian Sea.

Visakhapatnam was also moved in a week later and was tasked to patrol the north Arabian Sea. On 18 January 2024, Visakhapatnam responded to a distress call from the Marshall Island-flagged MV Genco Picardy following a drone attack by unknown attackers at 11.11 pm on the night of 17 January. The Indian naval ship acknowledged the distress call and intercepted the vessel at 12.30 am the next day and provided support. Genco Picardy had 22 crew, including 9 Indian sailors. Following an EOD inspection by the ship's specialists, the ship was cleared to continue its journey without any casualties incurred aboard.

Following a distress call from the British owned, Marshall Islands flagged oil tanker MV Marlin Luanda on the night of 26 January 2024, Visakhapatnam sped to the scene to aid the ship in its fire fighting efforts by deploying its NBCD team (Nuclear-Biological-Chemical Defence and Damage control) along with firefighting equipment on board. The ship was reportedly attacked by the Houthis at approximately 7:45 pm and it had 22 Indians and one Bangladeshi crew member aboard. USS Carney (DDG 64) (also targeted by a Houthi missile, but shot down), the French frigate Alsace and other Operation Prosperity Guardian coalition ships also responded and rendered assistance. No injuries were reported as the fire had broken out In the cargo compartment. The vessel sailed to a safe harbour under its own power. On 15 August 2024, Shaurya Chakra was awarded to Lieutenant Commander Kapil Yadav, assistant engineer officer (AEO) of the ship by President Droupadi Murmu due to his selfless acts to bring down the fire onboard MV Marlin Luanda.

In mid-July 2024, Indian Navy's INS Visakhapatnam and INS Aditya conducted an exercise with US Navy's Carrier Strike Group 9 centred on USS Theodore Roosevelt along with Carrier Air Wing 11 and USS Daniel Inouye in the Indian Ocean.

On 5 and 6 October, Carrier Strike Groups of the Indian Navy and the Italian Navy led by INS Vikramaditya and ITS Cavour and accompanied by INS Visakhapatnam and ITS Alpino participated in a maritime bilateral exercise in the Arabian Sea. The exercise included aircraft like MiG-29K, F-35B and AV-8B Harrier II and integral helicopters. Operations in the sea phase included intense flight operations with fighter jets and helicopters for combined Large Force Engagements, Air Combat Missions, Helicopter Operations and Search & Rescue missions as well as co-ordinated weapon firings & joint manoeuvres to enhance joint operations, Command & Control capabilities and interoperability. The exercise also saw the participation of the Indian Air Force. During the Harbour Phase from 1 to 4 October, the exercise saw Subject Matter Expert exchanges and other key interactions as well as a Pre-Sail Planning Conference.

=== IFR-2026 ===
INS Visakapatnam participated at the International Fleet Review 2026 held at Visakapatanam.

== Gallery ==
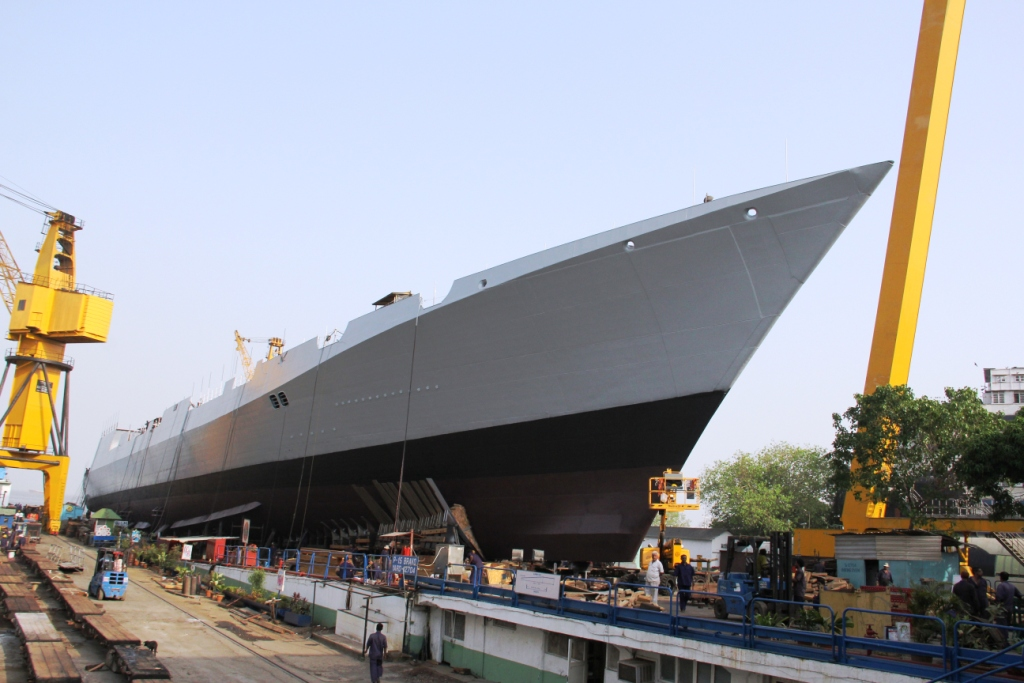
Visakhapatnam during launch.

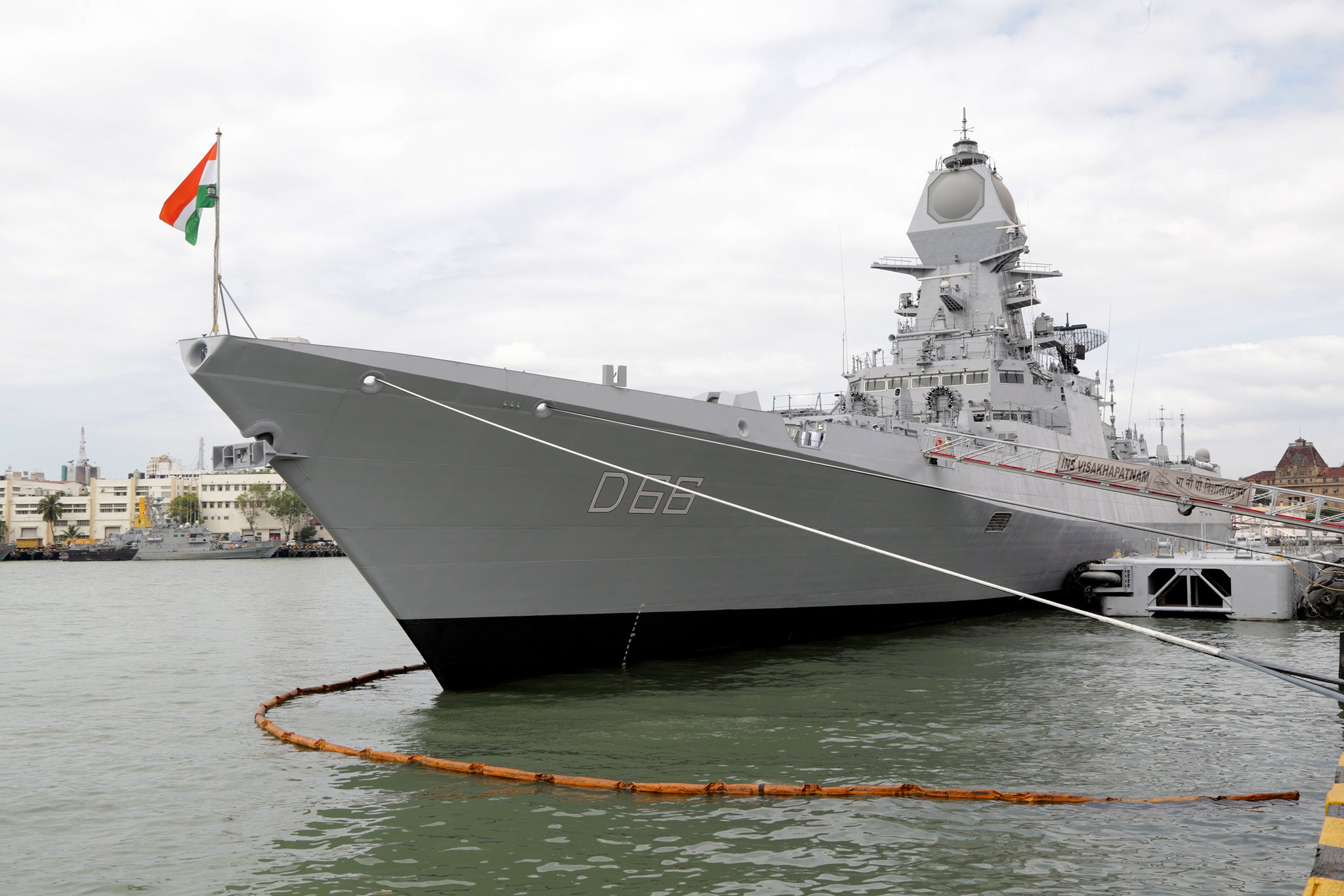
Visakhapatnam during commissioning.

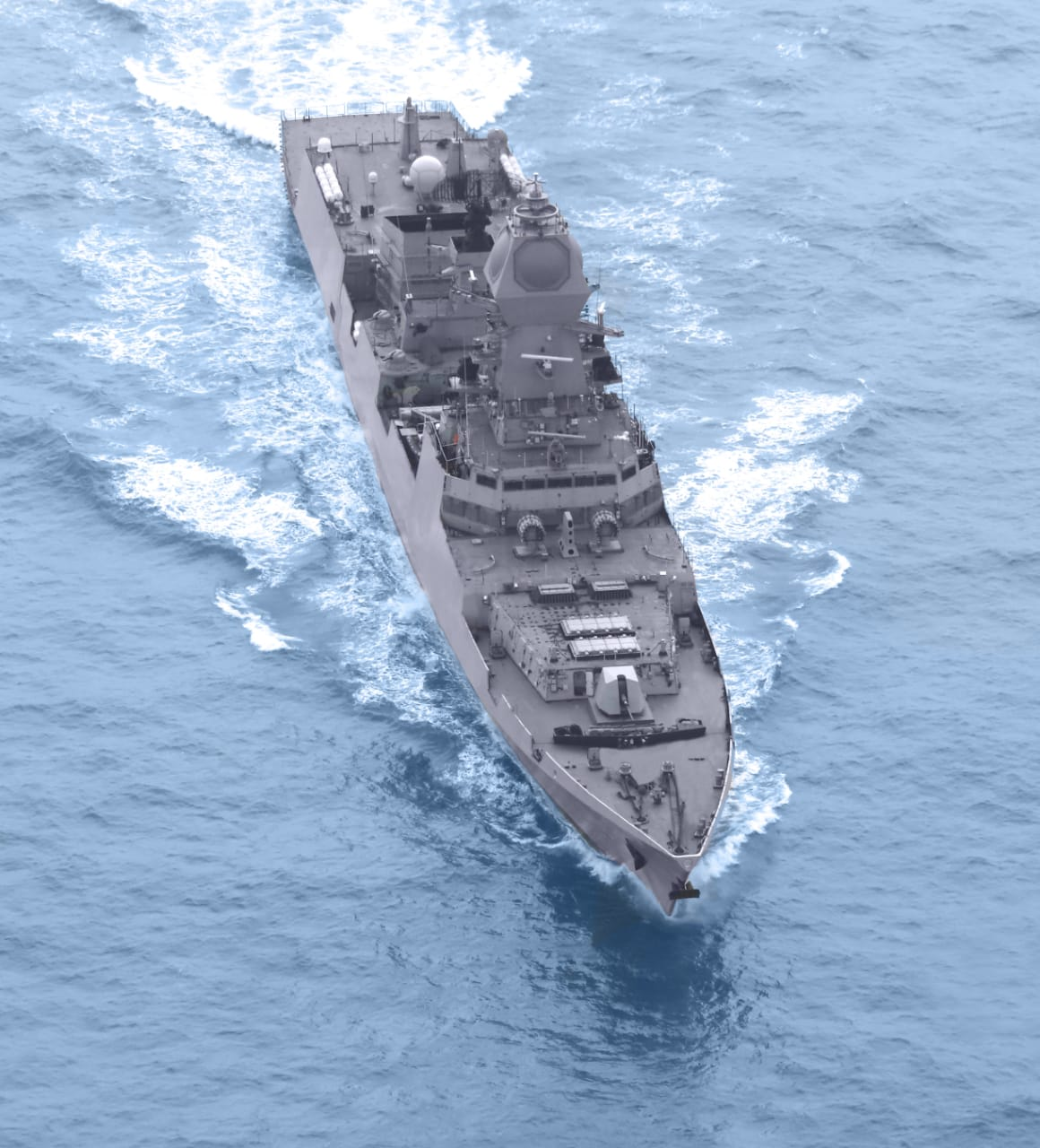
Visakhapatnam during sea trials.

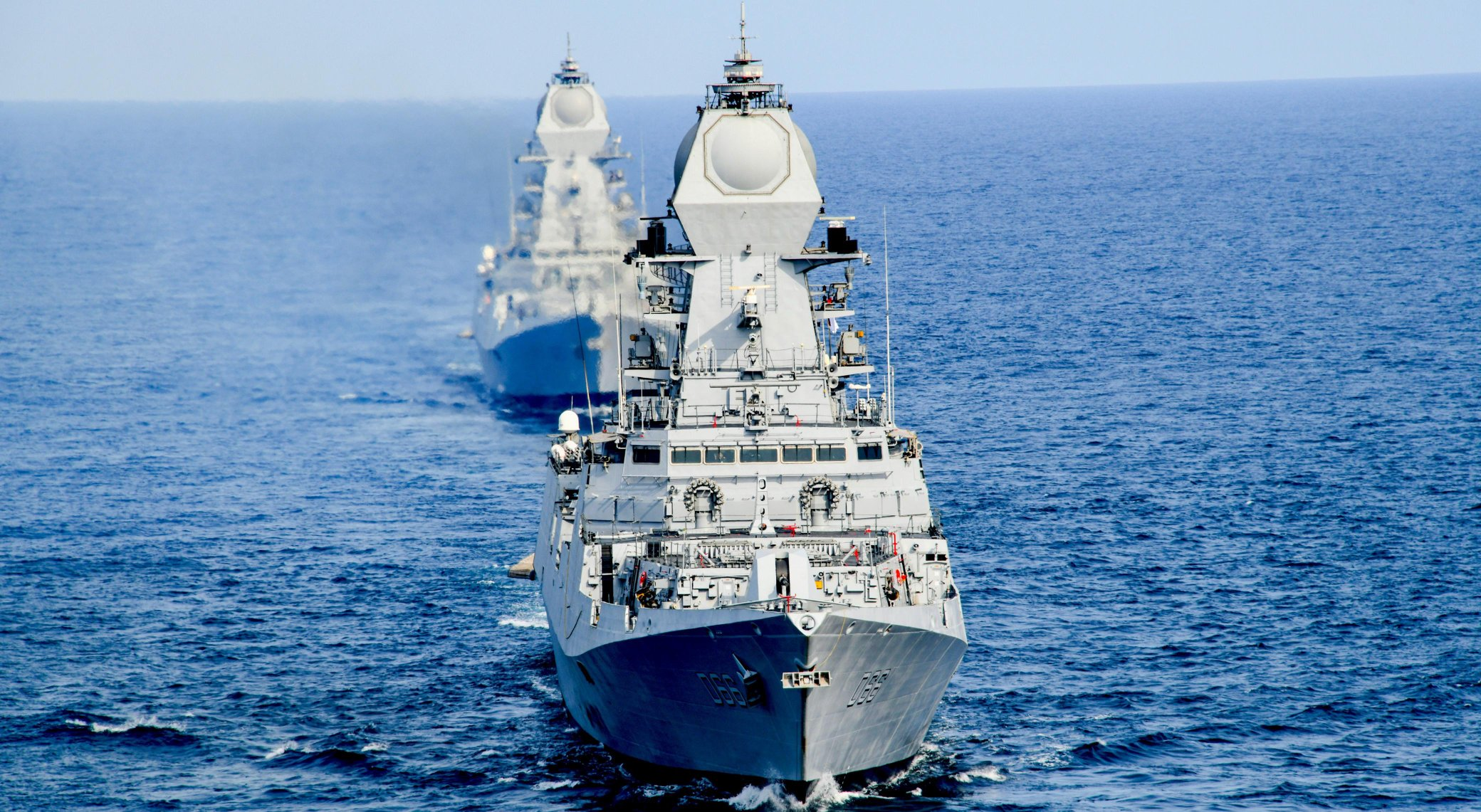
Visakhapatnam during Operation Sindoor.

== See also ==
- Rajput-class destroyer
- Delhi-class destroyer
- Kolkata-class destroyer
