= INS Mormugao =

Indian naval vessel

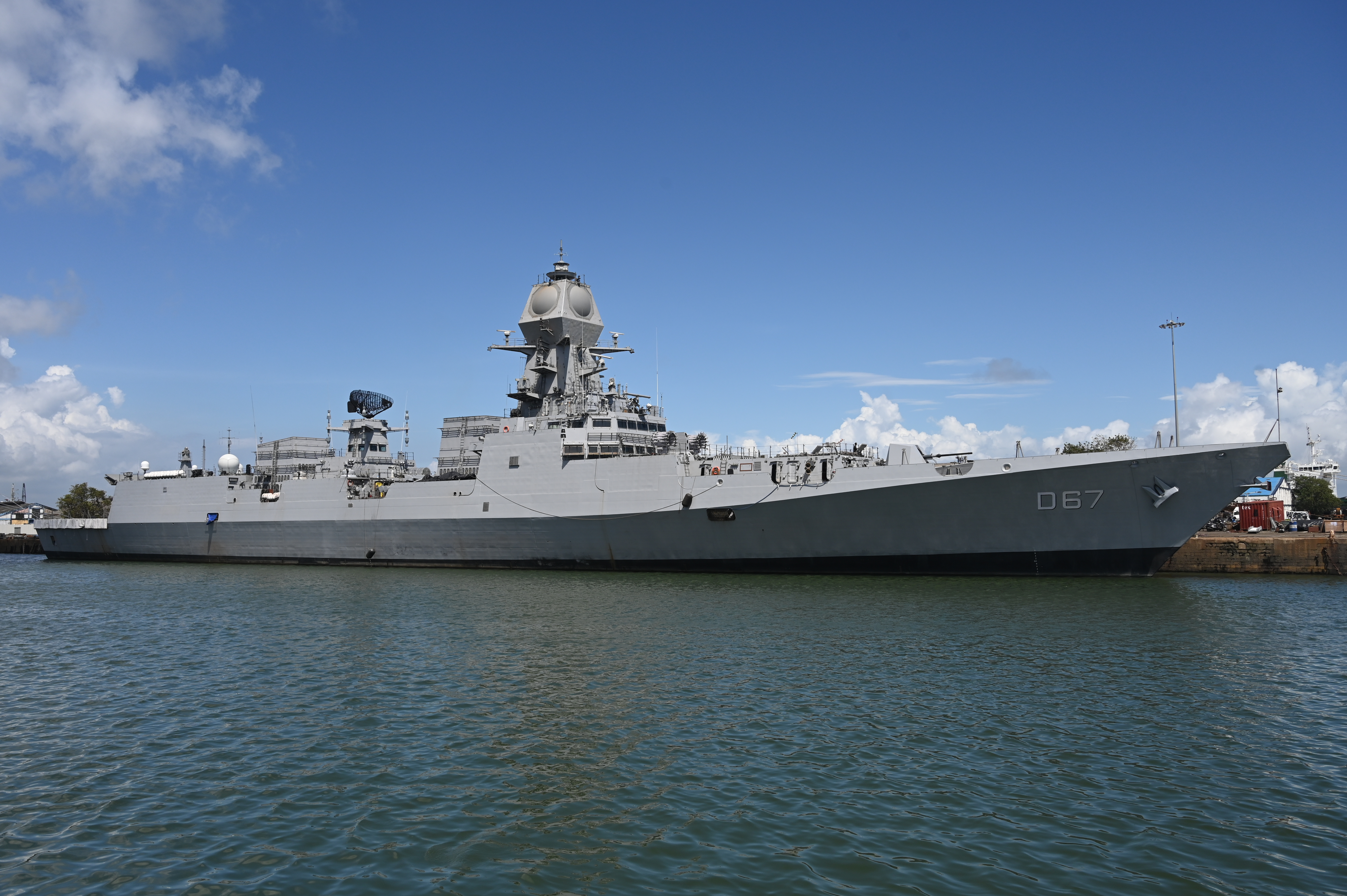
- Mormugao during delivery to the Indian Navy

History

India
- Name: INS Mormugao
- Namesake: Mormugao
- Operator: Indian Navy
- Builder: Mazagon Dock Limited
- Way number: D67
- Laid down: 4 June 2015
- Launched: 17 September 2016
- Acquired: 24 November 2022
- Commissioned: 18 December 2022
- Identification: Pennant number: D67
- Motto: सागरे विनाशकः - Destroyer In Sea
- Status: Active

General characteristics
- Type: Guided missile destroyer
- Displacement: 7,400 t (7,300 long tons; 8,200 short tons)
- Length: 163 m (535 ft)
- Beam: 17.4 m (57 ft)
- Draft: 6.5 m (21 ft)
- Propulsion: CODAG; 2 x Zorya M36E gas turbines, with 4 × DT-59 reversible gas turbines and 2 × RG-54 gearboxes; 2 × Bergen/GRSE KVM-diesel engines, 9,900 hp (7,400 kW) each; 4 × 1 MWe Wärtsilä WCM-1000 generator sets driving Cummins KTA50G3 engines and Kirloskar 1 MV AC generators
- Speed: In excess of 30 knots (56 km/h)
- Range: 8,000 nautical miles (15,000 km; 9,200 mi) at 18 knots (33 km/h; 21 mph)
- Endurance: 45 days
- Boats & landing craft carried: 4 x RHIB
- Crew: 300 (50 officers + 250 sailors)
- Sensors & processing systems: Radar :-; IAI EL/M-2248 MF-STAR S-Band AESA radar; BEL RAWL-02/LW-08 L-Band air-search radar; Terma/Tata Scanter-6002 X-Band surface-search radar; Sonar :-; BEL HUMSA-NG active/passive sonar; BEL "Nagin" active towed-array sonar; Combat Suite :-; "Combat Management System" (CMS)
- Electronic warfare & decoys: DRDO "Shakti" EW suite (equipped with ESM/ECM and "Radar Finger Printing System" (RFPS)); DRDO "Nayan" COMINT suite; Decoys :-; 4 x Kavach decoy launchers; 2 x Maareech torpedo-countermeasure systems
- Armament: Anti-air warfare :-; 4 × 8-cell VLS, for a total of 32 Barak 8 surface-to-air missiles; Anti-surface warfare :-; 2 x 8-cell VLS, for 16 BrahMos anti-ship missiles; Anti-submarine warfare :-; 4 × 533 mm (21 in) torpedo tubes; 2 × RBU-6000 anti-submarine rocket launchers; Guns :-; 1 × OTO Melara 76 mm naval gun; 4 x AK-630M CIWS; 2 x OFT 12.7 mm M2 Stabilized Remote Controlled Gun
- Aircraft carried: 2 × HAL Dhruv (or) Sea King Mk. 42B
- Aviation facilities: Enclosed helicopter hangar and flight deck capable of accommodating two multi-role helicopters.
- Notes: Modified derivative of the Kolkata-class destroyer.

INS Mormugao is the second ship of the Visakhapatnam-class stealth guided-missile destroyers of the Indian Navy. She was built at Mazagon Dock Limited (MDL), and was launched on 17 September 2016. The ship was commissioned on 18 December 2022. She is named after the port city of Mormugao in Goa.

== Construction ==
The keel of Mormugao was laid down on 4 June 2015, and she was launched on 17 September 2016 at Mazagon Dock Limited of Mumbai.

Mormugao completed its basin trials on 15 December 2021 and started its maiden sea trials on 19 December 2021 commemorating the Goa Liberation Day. The ship was commissioned on 18 December 2022. The commissioning commanding officer is Captain Kapil Bhatia, VSM.

== Service history ==
On 14 May 2023, Mormugao successfully fired an advanced variant of Brahmos missile. In December 2023, Mormugao was deployed to the Arabian Sea along with INS Kochi and INS Kolkata to protect commercial shipping after an attack on a tanker transporting oil from Saudi Arabia to Mangalore.

=== Operation Sankalp: 2023–2024 anti-piracy patrols ===
Against the backdrop of the increasing attacks on commercial ships transiting the Red Sea, the Gulf of Aden, and the Arabian Sea by the end of 2023, the Indian Navy on 31 December 2023 said it had substantially enhanced maritime surveillance efforts in Central and North Arabian Sea and "augmented force levels" by primarily deploying the P-8I Neptune maritime patrol aircraft and the SeaGuardian drones, after two merchant vessels, MV Ruen and MV Chem Pluto, were targeted in the sea. Ruen was hijacked (later rescued by sister ship Kolkata) while Chem Pluto sustained drone hits eventually and making way to port, The Indian Navy deployed a large flotilla of destroyers to safeguard international security . The deployment into the Arabian Sea included the Navy's missile destroyers such as Kolkata, Kochi, Mormugao, INS Chennai and INS Visakhapatnam, virtually all of its modern destroyer force of its western fleet. Mormugao was deployed in the west Arabian Sea.

=== Clemenceau 25 ===
Mormugao joined the French Carrier Strike Group (CSG) centered on the Charles de Gaulle and her escort ships and fleet support ship during their departure from Goa and Kochi for the next phase of Mission Clemenceau 25 in the Indian and Pacific oceans. She participated in joint navigational drills and Maritime Partnership Exercise. The drill included combat manoeuvres and cross-deck helicopter deployment with the Forbin followed by replenishment by logistics support ship Jacques Chevallier. Simultaneously, Su-30MKI and Jaguar aircraft of the Indian Air Force also conducted joint anti-aircraft drills with Rafale M aircraft of the French Navy.

=== Exercise Konkan 2025 ===
INS Vikrant (R11) and its Carrier Battle Group (CBG), including Mormugaon, took part in the biennial Exercise Konkan 2025 with the Royal Navy's UK Carrier Strike Group 2025 (UK CSG 25), a formation centred on HMS Prince of Wales (R09), between 5 and 12 October 2025 off the Western Coast of India. This is the maiden instance of a dual carrier operation between the countries. While the UK CSG included HMS Richmond (F239) and RFA Tidespring (A136) along with HNoMS Roald Amundsen (F311) of the Royal Norwegian Navy and JS Akebono (DD-108) of the Japan Maritime Self-Defense Force, the Indian Navy's CBG included INS Kolkata (D63), INS Surat (D69), INS Tabar (F44), INS Teg (F45) and INS Deepak (A50). The 2021 edition, named Konkan Shakti, was the largest exercise in the series in which all three services of both countries participated. On 8 October, the Indian Air Force deployed its Su-30MKI and Jaguar aircraft for a one-day exercise with the group.

== Gallery ==
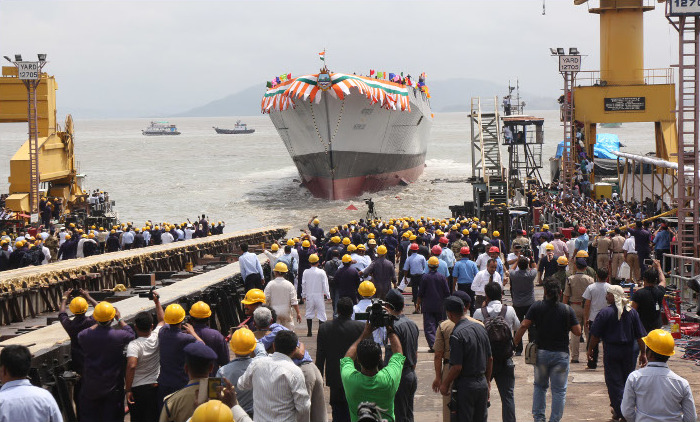
Mormugao floats on her own post launch

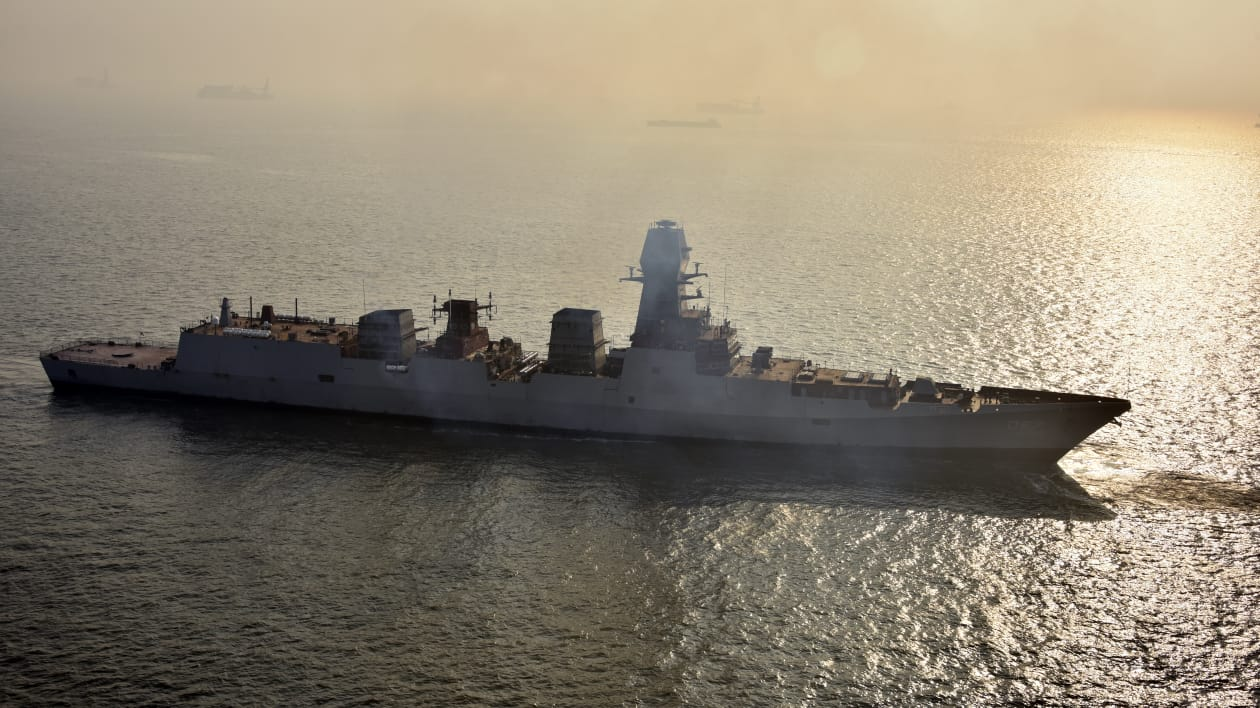
Mormugao, second indigenous stealth destroyer of the P15B class during maiden sortie.

== See also ==
- Delhi-class destroyer
- Kolkata-class destroyer
