= INS Kolkata =

Destroyer in the Indian Navy

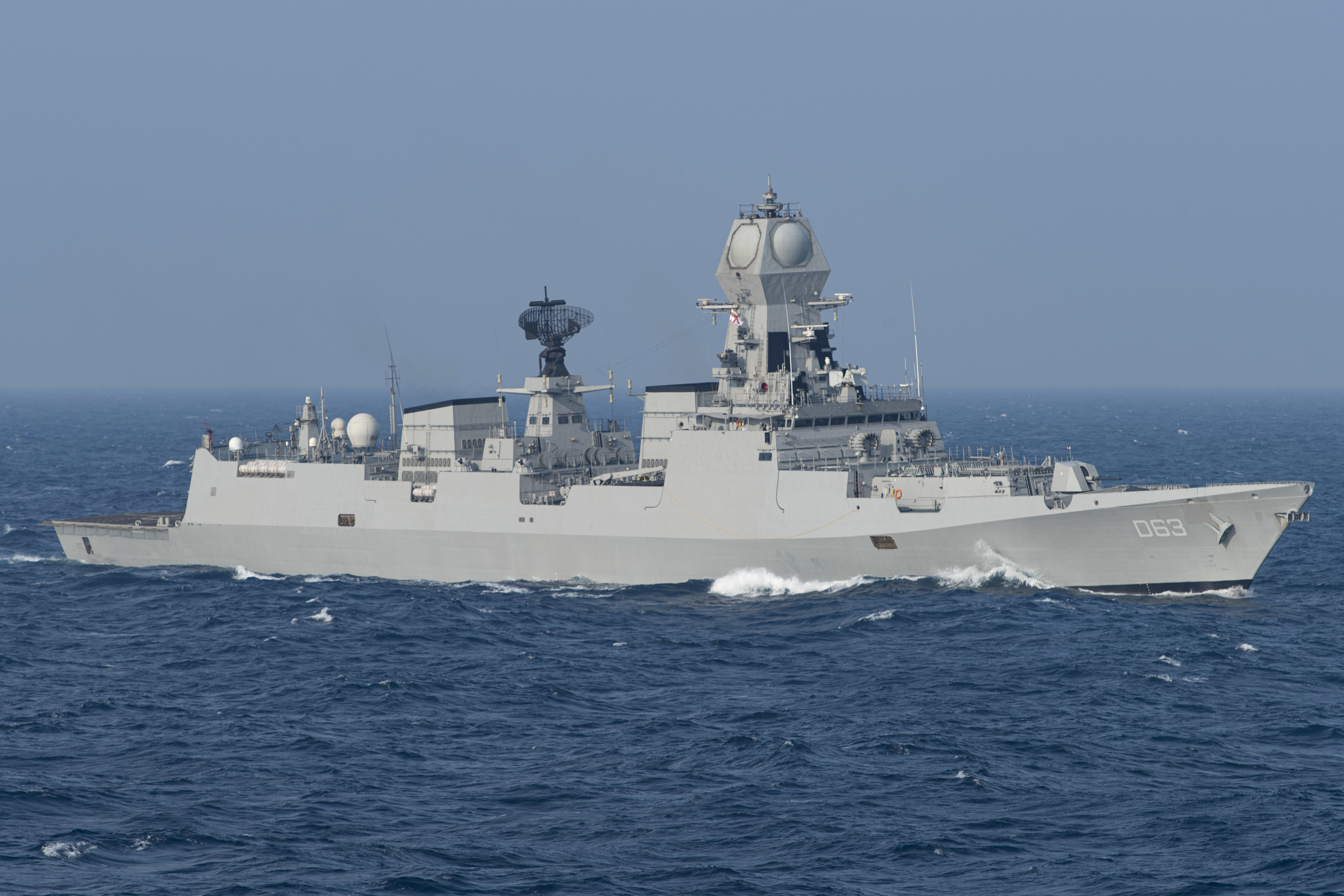
- INS Kolkata

History

India
- Name: Kolkata
- Namesake: Kolkata
- Builder: Mazagon Dock Limited
- Yard number: 701
- Way number: D63
- Laid down: September 2003
- Launched: 30 March 2006
- Acquired: 10 July 2014
- Commissioned: 16 August 2014
- Identification: Pennant number: D63; MMSI number: 419000852; Callsign: AWFA
- Motto: "Yudhay Sarvasannadh"(Sanskrit)"Always Prepared for Battle"
- Status: in active service
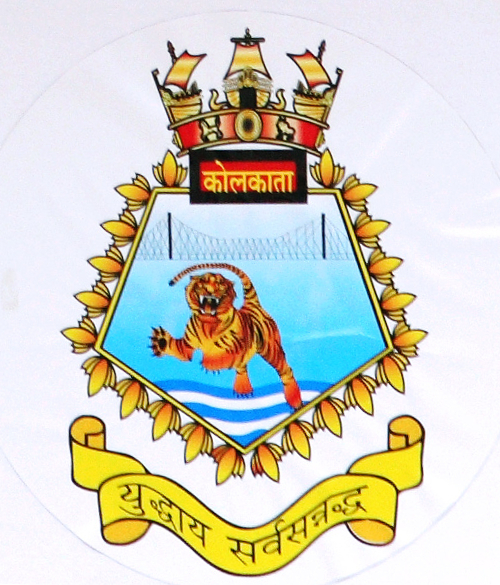
- Badge

General characteristics
- Type: Guided-missile destroyer
- Displacement: 7,400 t (7,300 long tons; 8,200 short tons) full load
- Length: 163 m (534 ft 9 in)
- Beam: 17.4 m (57 ft 1 in)
- Draught: 6.5 m (21 ft 4 in)
- Propulsion: Combined gas and gas system: 4 × Zorya-Mashproekt DT-59 reversible gas turbines producing 16.55MW each
- Speed: 30 knots (56 km/h)
- Range: 6,000 nmi (11,000 km) at 18 kn (33 km/h)
- Complement: 300 (50 officers + 250 sailors)
- Sensors & processing systems: Radar :-; IAI EL/M-2248 MF-STAR S-band AESA multi-function radar; Indra - TASL Lanza-N L-band air surveillance radar; Garpun Bal (3TS-25E) radar; Sonar :-; BEL HUMSA-NG bow sonar; BEL Nagin active towed array sonar; Combat Suite :-; BEL EMCCA Mk4 combat management system
- Electronic warfare & decoys: BEL Ellora electronic support measures; Decoys :-; 4 × Kavach decoy launchers; 2 × Maareech torpedo-countermeasure systems
- Armament: Anti-air warfare :-; 4 × 8-cell VLS, for a total of 32 Barak 8 surface-to-air missiles; Anti-surface warfare :-; 2 × 8-cell VLS, for 16 BrahMos anti-ship missiles; Anti-submarine warfare :-; 4 × 533 mm (21 in) torpedo tubes; 2 × RBU-6000 anti-submarine rocket launchers; Guns :-; 1 × OTO Melara 76 mm naval gun; 4 x AK-630 CIWS
- Aircraft carried: 2 × Sea King or HAL Dhruv helicopters
- Aviation facilities: Dual Enclosed hangar

INS Kolkata is the lead ship of the Kolkata-class stealth guided-missile destroyers of the Indian Navy. Named after the Indian city of Kolkata (formerly Calcutta), she was constructed at Mazagon Dock Limited (MDL) and was handed over to the navy on 10 July 2014 after completing her sea trials. The ship was officially commissioned by Prime Minister Narendra Modi in a ceremony held on 16 August 2014.

== Construction ==
The keel of Kolkata was laid down in September 2003 and she was launched on 30 March 2006. Her commissioning was originally planned for 2010, but this was delayed to 16 August 2014 as a result of a series of project delays. During her construction at MDL, she was given the designation Yard-701.

=== Sea trials ===
The commissioning of Kolkata was delayed from 2010 to 2014 due to delays in her construction and technical problems which were found during her sea trials. The issue detected was the generation of additional noise, which occurred when the engine, gearbox and shaft were operated together, but which worked issue-free when run independently. The issues were fixed and the sea trials were completed by February 2014, when the ship returned to MDL to undergo minor work before delivery.

=== 2014 carbon dioxide leak ===
On 7 March 2014, during a complete check-up of the ship's machinery to fix the problems found during sea trials, a naval officer was killed and several workers were injured when a valve on a CO_{2} bottle malfunctioned during a test of the vessel's carbon dioxide fire-fighting unit at the Mazagaon dockyard. For the test, fire-retarding carbon dioxide gas was to be released into a compartment; the test was part of the destroyer's delivery trials. Kolkata's engineering officer-designate, Commander Kuntal Wadhwa, inhaled a large amount of gas and was rushed to St George's Hospital, where he was pronounced dead. Two dockyard officials who also inhaled the gas were also taken to hospital for treatment. MDL stated that the incident will not delay the scheduled commissioning of the ship.

=== Weapon trials ===
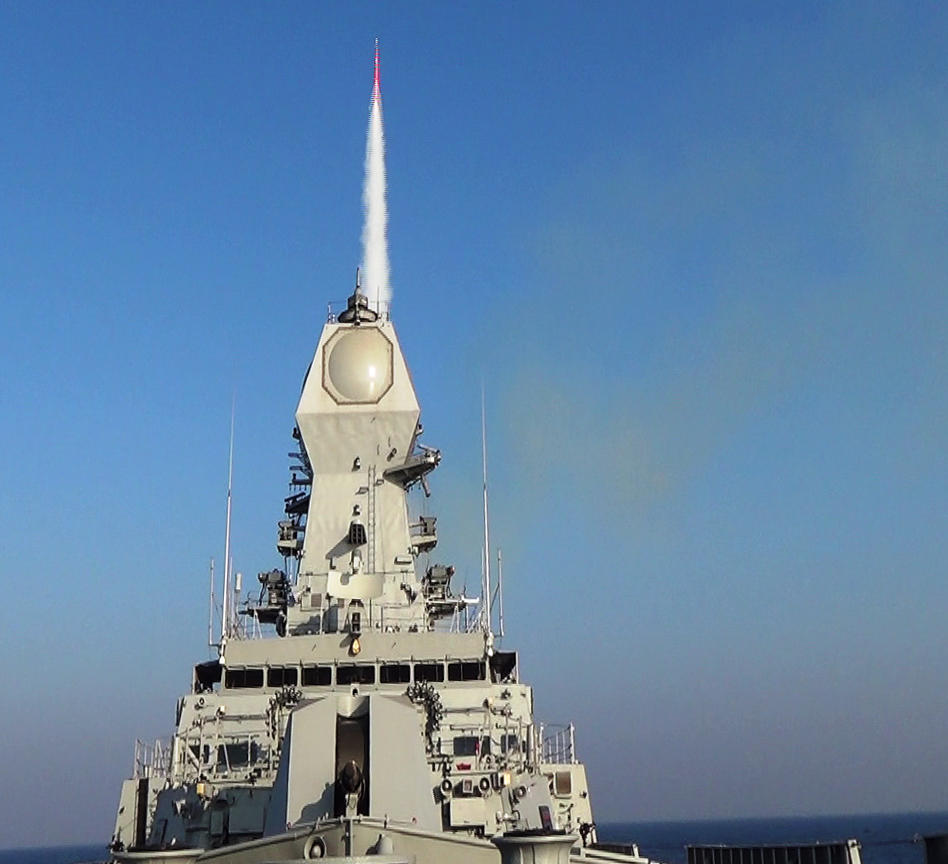
INS Kolkata firing a Long Range Surface to Air Missile

As part of her pre-commissioning weapon trials at sea, Kolkata test-fired a BrahMos missile off Karwar's coast on 9 June 2014, and the test met all parameters. On 15 February 2015, a BrahMos missile was test fired from INS Kolkata during the Tropex exercise in the Arabian Sea.

On 29 December 2015 and 30 December 2015 the Indian Navy successfully test-fired the Barak 8 missile from INS Kolkata. Two missiles were fired at high speed targets, during naval exercises being undertaken in the Arabian Sea.

== Service history ==
Deployment	Date	Port Visited	Commander	Notes and References
2016
East Africa and the Southern Indian Ocean with frigate INS Trikand and fleet tanker INS Aditya	28-30 August	Port Victoria, Seychelles	Captain Rahul Vilas Gokhale	Enhance defence ties with the Seychelles People Defense Forces
East Africa and the Southern Indian Ocean with frigate INS Trikand and fleet tanker INS Aditya	1-4 September	Port Louis, Mauritius	Captain Rahul Vilas Gokhale	
East Africa and the Southern Indian Ocean with frigate INS Trikand and fleet tanker INS Aditya	10-13 September	Mombasa, Kenya	Captain Rahul Vilas Gokhale	
East Africa and the Southern Indian Ocean with frigate INS Trikand and fleet tanker INS Aditya	20-23 September	Durban, South Africa	Captain Rahul Vilas Gokhale	

=== Operation Sankalp: 2023-24 anti-piracy patrols ===
Against the backdrop of an increase in attacks on commercial ships transiting the Red Sea, the Gulf of Aden, and the Arabian Sea, on 21 December 2023, the Indian Navy increased maritime surveillance efforts in the Central and North Arabian Sea by deploying the P-8I Neptune maritime patrol aircraft and the SeaGuardian drone. The Indian Navy deployed a large flotilla of destroyers to safeguard international security.

On 22 February 2024, Palau-flagged MV Islander came under Houthi attack of two anti-ship ballistic missiles. INS Kolkata, nearest to the ship rushed to assistance and An explosive disposal and medical team was sent to the vessel for assisteance. The ship could continue its journey forward.

On 4 March 2024, INS Kolkata, deployed to the Gulf of Aden, responded to a request from MSC Sky II, a Liberian flagged container vessel, that had reportedly been attacked by a drone or missile, at about 1900 h (IST) on 4 March 24, 90 nm southeast of Aden. The ship's master reported smoke and flames onboard following the attack. INS Kolkata was quickly redirected to provide the required support, and by 2230 hours (IST), it had reached the incident site. The Kolkata then escorted the ship from the area of the incident into the territorial seas of Djibouti at the master's request. Early on 5 March, a 12-person specialised firefighting team from Kolkata boarded the Sky II and extinguished the remaining fires. In addition, an explosive ordnance disposal team boarded the Sky II to evaluate residual risk. The 23-person crew, 13 of whom were citizens of India, were safe, and the ship continued sailing towards its next destination.

On 6 March 2024, INS Kolkata responded to another crisis in the Gulf of Aden. About 55 nautical miles southwest of Aden, a drone or missile struck the Barbados-flagged bulk carrier MV True Confidence. When INS Kolkata arrived on the site, it used its onboard aircraft and boats and rescued 21 crew members, including an Indian national, via life rafts. The injured crew members received vital medical attention from the ship's medical experts.

According to the US Central Command (CENTCOM), an anti-ship ballistic missile had struck the Barbados-flagged Liberian-owned MV True Confidence. Three people were listed as critically injured, three as fatal, and at least four injuries were reported by the ship's crew. There was significant damage to the ship.

On 17 March 2024, INS Kolkata rescued 17 crew members and captured 35 pirates from the ex-Malta flagged MV Ruen, which had been hijacked on 14 December 2023, after a 40-hour long operation. As an Indian helicopter approached the hijacked ship, the pirates opened fire at it, shot down a ship-based UAV used for monitoring, and attacked the INS Kolkata as it intercepted the hijacked vessel. The interception was carried out about 2,600 km from the Indian coast. INS Kolkata disabled the ship's steering system and navigational aids, forcing the hijacked vessel to stop. Videos of the operation released by the Navy show the pirates using the crew members as human shield as warning shots were fired from the Kolkata. The entire operation was supported by INS Subhadra, UAVs, and P-8I aircraft. A platoon of 8 MARCOS commandos were air dropped from a C-17 Globemaster of the Indian Air Force. The warship called upon the pirates to surrender and to release the vessel and the crew from Bulgaria, Angola and Myanmar who were being held hostage. No injuries were sustained during the operation, and the ship was checked for illegal arms, ammunition, and contraband. The Navy reported that the ship, carrying approximately 37,800 tonnes of cargo worth over $1 million, would be brought safely to the nearest port after assessment of seaworthiness and essential repairs were undertaken by the naval technical team, for making the ship fit for further voyage. INS Kolkata, carrying the 35 pirates, later docked at Mumbai Harbour and handed over the pirates to the Mumbai Police. The pirates would later be taken for medical examination. After that, they will be produced before a court on 24 March 2024.

The commanding officer of INS Kolkata, Captain Sharad Sinsunwal was awarded Shaurya Chakra on 15 August 2024 by President Droupadi Murmu due to his service during Operation Sankalp where INS Kolkata saved 67 lives and freed 17 hostages in 4 incidents. According to reports, "a total of 27 attacks took place during the time INS Kolkata was in the region, severely damaging 13 ships and resulting in the loss of lives of sailors." Many hits were also within few miles of the ship.

=== Exercise Konkan 2025 ===
INS Vikrant (R11) and its Carrier Battle Group (CBG), including Kolkata, took part in the biennial Exercise Konkan 2025 with the Royal Navy's UK Carrier Strike Group 2025 (UK CSG 25), a formation centred on HMS Prince of Wales (R09), between 5 and 12 October 2025 off the Western Coast of India. This is the maiden instance of a dual carrier operation between the countries. While the UK CSG included HMS Richmond (F239) and RFA Tidespring (A136) along with HNoMS Roald Amundsen (F311) of the Royal Norwegian Navy and JS Akebono (DD-108) of the Japan Maritime Self-Defense Force, the Indian Navy's CBG included INS Mormugao (D67), INS Surat (D69), INS Tabar (F44), INS Teg (F45) and INS Deepak (A50). The 2021 edition, named Konkan Shakti, was the largest exercise in the series in which all three services of both countries participated. On 8 October, the Indian Air Force deployed its Su-30MKI and Jaguar aircraft for a one-day exercise with the group.

=== 2026 ===
On 27 May, the destroyer was deployed for patrols in the Gulf of Aden. The ship immediately launched an operation after suspicious movements around a merchant vessel using its integral helicopter prevented possible piracy incident when MV Mashallah 1 was targeted.

On 15 September 2026, "agressive and unprofessional maneuvers" of PNS Hunain led to its collision with a frontline warship of the Indian Navy in the northern Arabian Sea. PNS Hunain was reported to have suffered major damages in the incident and returned back for repairs. The Pakistani ship was attending the Sea Spark 26 biennial military exercise. Both India and Pakistan accused each other for violating Article 10 of the 1991 bilateral agreement which mandates a minimum of 3 nautical miles (5.6 kilometres) to be maintained between naval vessels of the two nations. Though media reports are referring to the Indian warship in the incident as INS Kolkata, the Indian government is yet to confirm the identification.

Upon the request of Iran, Indian Navy MARCOS commandos paradropped from an IAF C-17 on 2rd November 2026 on a anti-piracy commando raid. They were dropped into the Arabian sea, near Somalia, then proceeded to storm and secure an Iranian fishing vessel Azini ,successfully eliminated the pirate threat, and safely freed the 20-man crew. They were again aided by mission deployed INS Kolkata, deployed over 3000 kilometers from Mumbai.

== See also ==
- INS Kochi - sister-ship and second of the class.
- INS Chennai -sister-ship and third of the class.
- HMS Calcutta
