= Maareech ATDS =

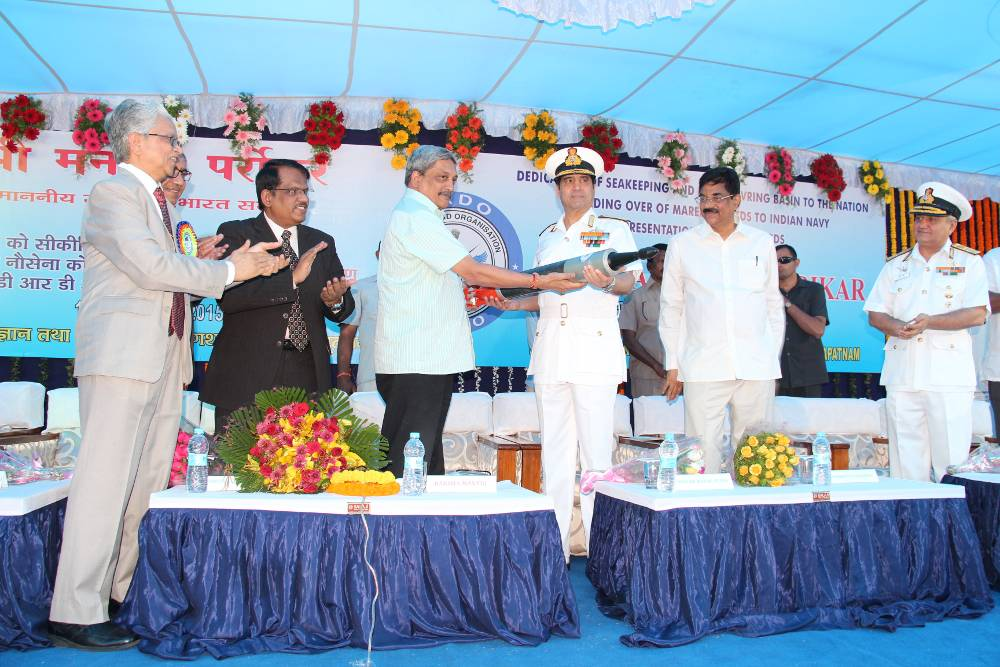
- Defence Minister Manohar Parrikar hands over the Maareech ATDS to Chief of the Naval Staff Adm. Robin K. Dhowan
- Type: Torpedo Decoy System
- Place of origin: India

Service history
- Used by: Indian Navy

Production history
- Designer: Naval Physical and Oceanographic Laboratory; Naval Science and Technological Laboratory
- Manufacturer: Bharat Electronics; KELTRON

Maareech Advanced Torpedo Decoy System (ATDS) is a torpedo detection and countermeasure system used by the Indian Navy. The system offers a complete solution to detect and locate an incoming torpedo and to apply countermeasures to protect naval platform against torpedo attack. It was developed as a joint project of the Naval Physical and Oceanographic Laboratory (NPOL), Kochi and the Naval Science and Technological Laboratory (NSTL), Visakhapatnam.

== Description ==
It is an anti-torpedo system with towed and expendable decoys. The system is capable of detecting, confusing, diverting and decoying the incoming torpedoes. The decoy helps in exhausting the energy of the torpedo by running the latter through long and ineffective course and prevents them from homing in to the targeted platform with its advanced countermeasures capabilities.

Mareech systems is being deployed on all current and future frontline warships of Indian Navy ships.

The underwater arrays for Maareech are being manufactured by KELTRON Controls at Aroor while the system is being integrated by Bharat Electronics Limited (BEL).

== Operators ==
India

- Indian Navy
  - Visakhapatnam-class destroyer
  - Kolkata-class destroyer
  - Nilgiri-class frigate
  - INS Vikrant

== See also ==
- Advanced Light Torpedo Shyena - Indian light torpedo
- S.M.A.R.T (missile) - A hybrid weapon under development by DRDO
- Varunastra (torpedo) - Indian heavy torpedo
- Maricha
