= Yun Feng =

- Type: Land-attack cruise missile
- Place of origin: Taiwan

Service history
- In service: Deployed

Production history
- Designer: National Chung-Shan Institute of Science and Technology
- No. built: >50 (in production)

Specifications
- Propellant: Liquid fuel ramjet engine with solid rocket booster
- Operational range: 1,200–2,000 kilometres (750–1,240 mi)
- Maximum speed: (Mach 6) 2,060 m/s (4,600 mph)
- Launch platform: Transporter erector launcher
- Transport: 10x10 truck

The Yun Feng (Chinese: 雲峰; lit. 'Cloud Peak'), officially designated Ching Tien (擎天), is a Taiwanese hypersonic land-attack cruise missile.

== Design and development ==
The missile was developed by the Chungshan Institute of Science and Technology and has a range of about 1,200–2,000 kilometres (750–1,240 mi) kilometers. It has a ramjet engine with a solid rocket booster capable of a hypersonic speed of Mach 6 or 2,060 m/s (4,600 mph). It can carry a semi-armor piercing high explosive and fragmentation warhead. The missile is one of the few assets within Taiwan's arsenal which can reach targets in north and central People's Republic of China. Development may have been started as far back as the Lee Teng-hui administration but official reports of its existence did not surface until 2012. Test flights of the Yun Feng were concealed within the HF-3 supersonic anti-ship missile test flight program.

In 2016, Ministry of National Defense (MND) denied reports that the missile program was terminated. This speculation was based on a belief that the project would be cancelled as a goodwill gesture towards China. The missile's existence was publicly acknowledged for the first time by defense minister Chiu Kuo-cheng during a Legislative Yuan joint committee hearing in October 2021.

The project received and was known by the codename Yun Feng. The missile is officially designated the Ching Tien (擎天).

== Variants ==
In 2018, it was announced that NTD 12.4 billion (~ USD 390 million) had been allocated by the Ministry of Defense under the "Qilin Project” to both extend the range of the missile as well as to adapt it for satellite launch.

=== Enhanced Yun Feng ===
In August 2019, mass production of the enhanced Yun Feng cruise missile commenced with an initial order for 20 missiles and 10 mobile launch vehicles. The enhanced variant has been described as a high altitude ramjet powered cruise missile.

=== Satellite launch vehicle ===
The missile is being upgraded to function as a satellite launch vehicle by National Chung-Shan Institute of Science and Technology. This vehicle will be capable of delivering satellites between 50 and 200 kilograms at a low Earth orbit of around 500 kilometers. It is suspected that the upgrade program will extend the range of the missile to 2,000 kilometres (1,200 mi), which puts Beijing within its striking range.

== See also ==
- BrahMos
- CX-1 Missile Systems
- HD-1
- P-800 Oniks
- SSM-N-9 Regulus II
- Defense industry of Taiwan
