= BrahMos =

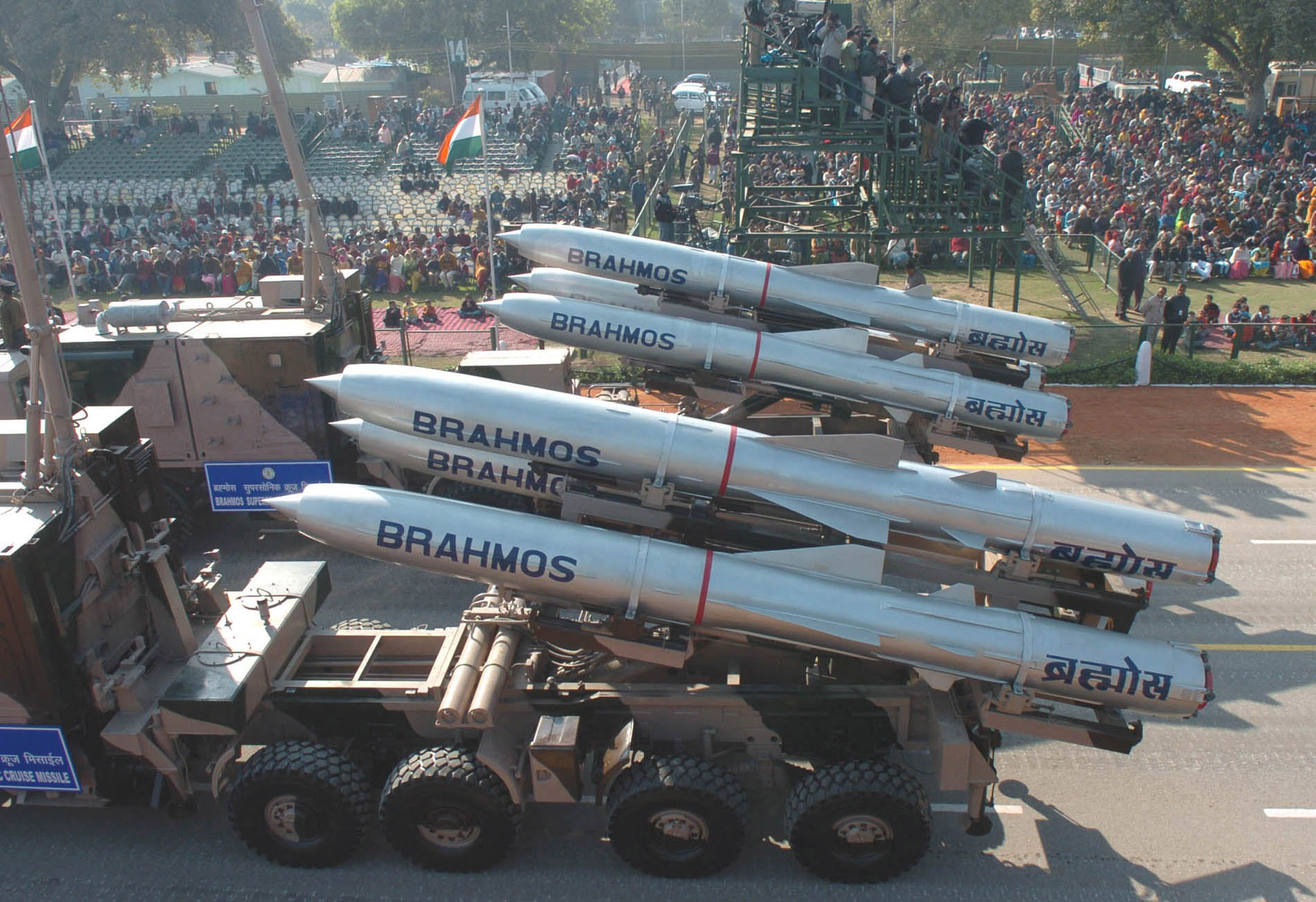
- Brahmos at the Delhi Republic Day parade in 2006
- Type: Cruise missile Air-launched cruise missile Anti-ship missile Land-attack missile Surface-to-surface missile Submarine-launched cruise missile
- Place of origin: India; Russia

Service history
- In service: 21 June 2007 – present
- Used by: Indian Army; Indian Navy; Indian Air Force; Philippine Marine Corps
- Wars: 2025 India–Pakistan conflict

Production history
- Designer: Defence Research and Development Organisation; NPO Mashinostroyeniya
- Manufacturer: BrahMos Aerospace Limited
- Unit cost: BrahMos: US$ 3.5 million BrahMos-ER: US$ 4.85 million
- Variants: Ship-launched; Land-launched; Submarine-launched; Air-launched; BrahMos-ER; BrahMos-NG; BrahMos-II

Specifications
- Mass: BrahMos: 3,000 kg (6,600 lb); BrahMos-A: 2,500 kg (5,500 lb); BrahMos-NG: 1,200–1,500 kg (2,600–3,300 lb)
- Length: BrahMos: 8.4 m (28 ft); BrahMos-NG: 6 m (20 ft)
- Diameter: BrahMos: 0.6 m (2.0 ft); BrahMos-NG: 0.5 m (1.6 ft)
- Warhead: 200–300 kg (440–660 lb) nuclear conventional semi-armour-piercing warhead
- Engine: 1st Stage: Solid rocket booster [EEL] 2nd Stage: Liquid rocket ramjet [NPO]
- Propellant: 1st Stage: Solid fuel 2nd Stage: Liquid fuel
- Operational range: Ship or Land platform : 800–900 km (500–560 mi); Air platform : 450–500 km (280–310 mi); Export : 290 km (180 mi)
- Flight ceiling: 15 km (49,000 ft)
- Flight altitude: Sea skimming, as low as 3 to 10 meters
- Maximum speed: Mach 3 (3,700 km/h; 2,300 mph; 1.0 km/s)
- Guidance system: Mid-course: INS + multi-GNSS; Terminal: ARH
- Accuracy: 1 m CEP
- Launch platform: Warship; Land-based TEL; Submarine; Fighter aircraft

The BrahMos (also designated as PJ-10) is a long-range, ramjet-powered supersonic cruise missile that can be launched from submarines, ships, fighter aircraft or TEL. It is a joint venture between India's Defence Research and Development Organisation (DRDO) and the Russian Federation's NPO Mashinostroyeniya, who together have formed BrahMos Aerospace. The missile is based on P-800 Oniks. The name BrahMos is a portmanteau formed from the names of two rivers, the Brahmaputra of India and the Moskva of Russia.

Land-launched, ship-launched as well as air-launched versions have been inducted across the services of the Indian Armed Forces.

The missile guidance has been developed by BrahMos Aerospace. In 2016, after India joined the Missile Technology Control Regime (MTCR), the range of the missile was gradually enhanced.

In 2022, the CEO of BrahMos Aerospace, Atul Rane, stated that a future hypersonic missile, designated as the BrahMos-II and based on the 3M22 Zircon, could be developed.

== Origin ==
Warning: Loud sound BrahMos tested with Indian components in January 2022.

The BrahMos was developed from Russia's NPO Mashinostroyenia (NPOMASH) P-800 Oniks family of cruise missiles, through a joint venture between NPOMASH and India's Defence Research and Development Organisation (DRDO), named BrahMos Aerospace.The missile design was significantly aided by Alexander Leonov, CEO and Chief designer at NPOMASH. The company was established on 5 December 1995 with an authorized share capital of US$250 million. India holds 50.5% share of the joint venture, and its initial financial contribution was US$126.25 million, while Russia holds 49.5% share with an initial contribution of US$123.75 million.

Since late 2004, the missile has undergone several tests from a variety of platforms, including a land-based test from the Pokhran range in the desert, in which the evasive 'S' maneuver at Mach 2.8 was demonstrated for the Indian Army, and a launch in which the land attack capability from sea was demonstrated.

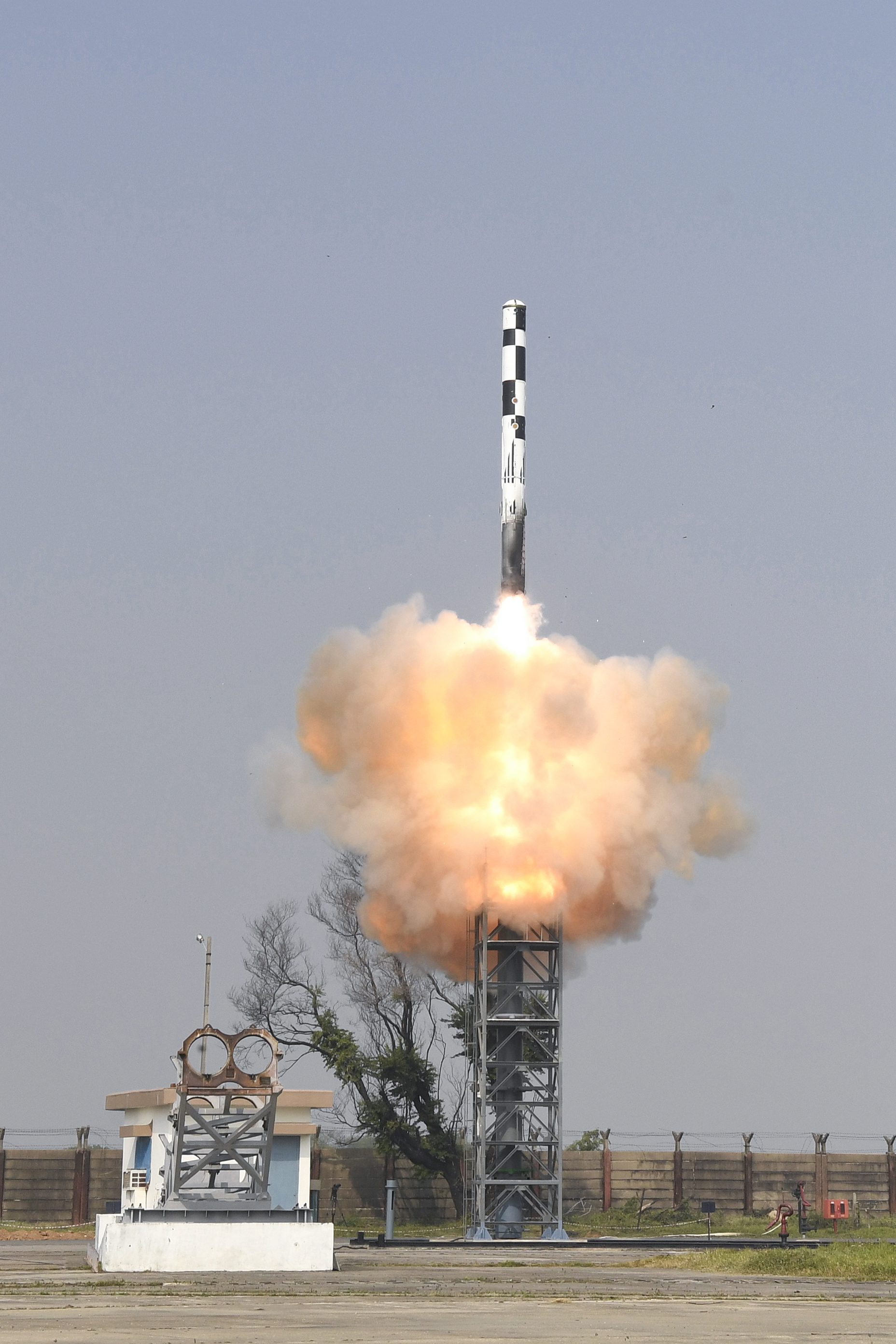
BrahMos is India's fastest cruise missile

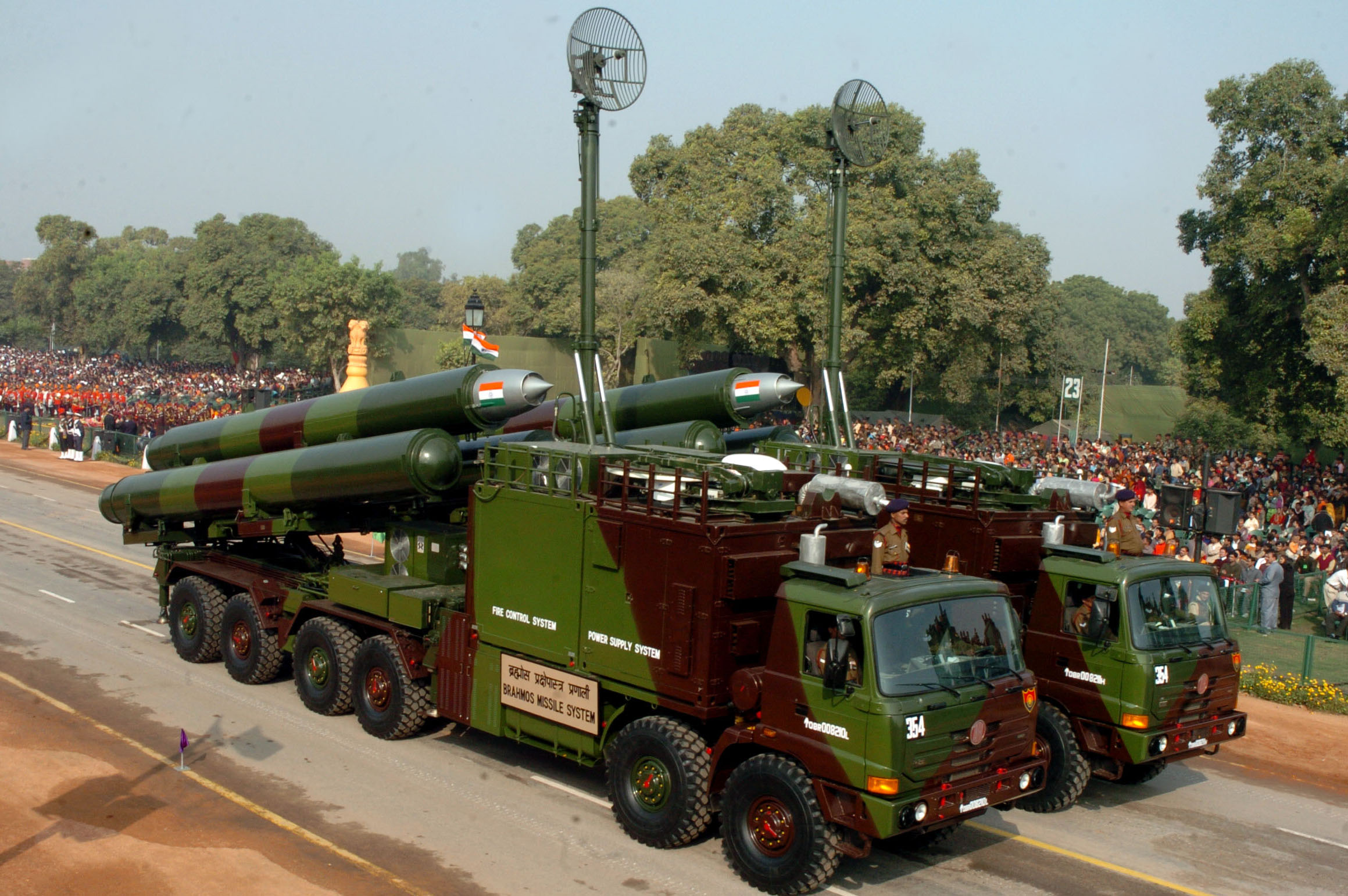
BrahMos missile at Republic Day Parade 2009

Keltec (now known as BrahMos Aerospace Trivandrum Ltd or BATL), an Indian state-owned firm, was acquired by BrahMos Corporation in 2008. Approximately ₹1,500 crore (equivalent to ₹46 billion or US$473.8 million in 2026) invested in the facility to make BrahMos components and integrate the missile systems. This was necessitated by the increased order book of the missile system, with orders having been placed by both the Indian Army and Navy. Initially, Russia supplied 65% of the BrahMos' components, including its ramjet engine and radar seeker. As of 2018, 65% of the missile was manufactured in India and there were plans to increase this to 85% by replacing the components with an Indian made seeker and booster.

The BrahMos headquarters complex is located at New Delhi and consists of a design centre and aerospace knowledge centre. The integration complex is located at Hyderabad and a production centre is located at Thiruvananthapuram. Another assembly line is being established at Pilani. The aerodynamic characterization research was conducted at the National Aerospace Laboratories' 1.2m Trisonic Wind Tunnel Facility.

Defence Materials and Stores Research and Development Establishment (DMSRDE) was successful in preparing domestic fuel for BrahMos. Testing of the fuel, which will power the missile's liquid ramjet engine, has begun at Defence Research and Development Laboratory (DRDL). As per the lab, the fuel will not freeze even in temperatures between −50° and −55 °C. It will replace the imported fuel from Russia.

== Development ==
=== Surface-to-surface variants ===
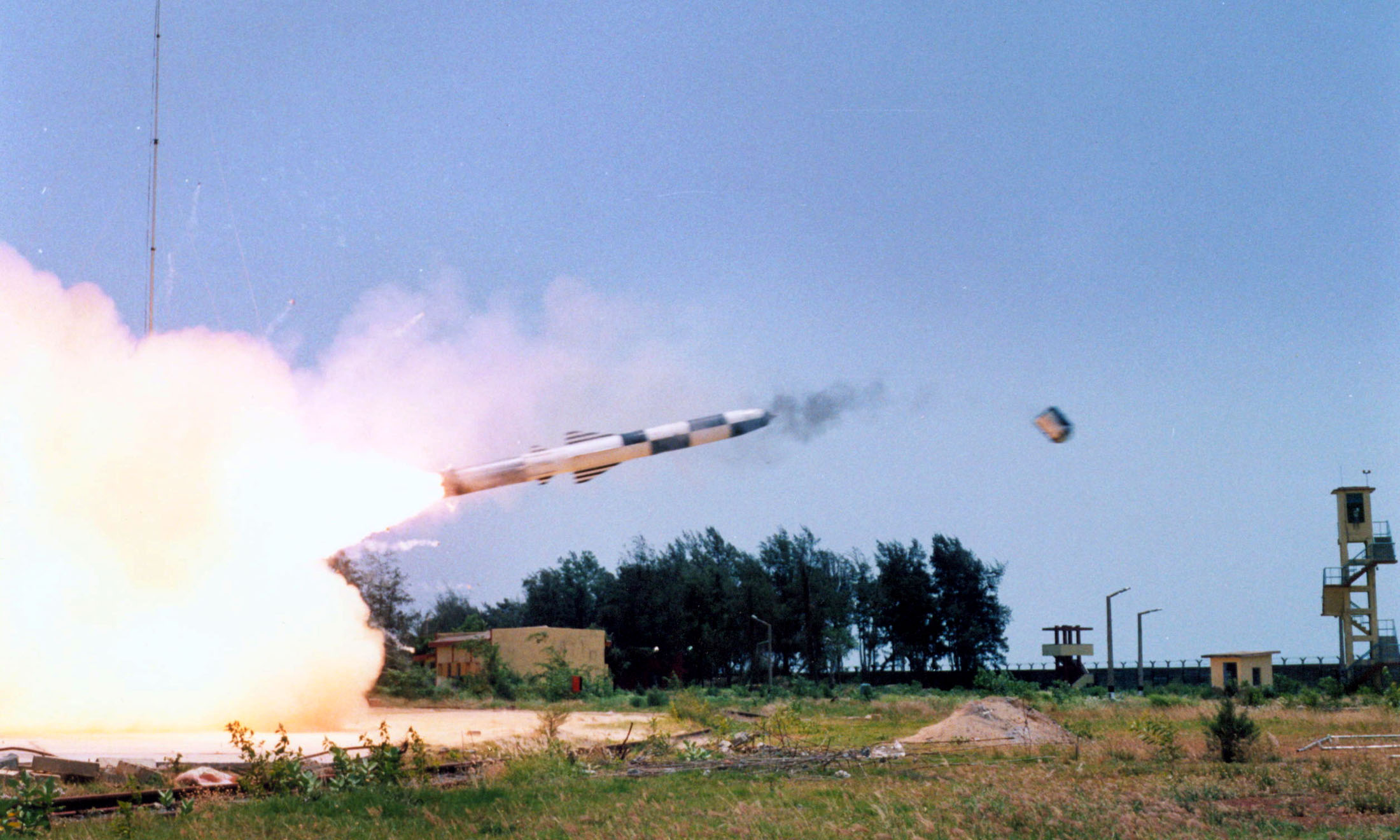
Surface-launched BrahMos tested in May 2018.

BrahMos was first test-fired on 12 June 2001 from the Integrated Test Range (ITR), Chandipur in a vertical launch configuration. On 14 June 2004, another test was conducted at ITR and BrahMos was fired from a mobile launcher. On 5 March 2008, the land attack version of the missile was fired from the destroyer INS Rajput and the missile hit and destroyed the right target among a group of targets. The vertical launch of BrahMos was conducted on 18 December 2008 from INS Ranvir. The BrahMos I Block-I for the army was successfully tested with new capabilities in the deserts of Rajasthan, at a test range near Pokharan in December 2004 and March 2007. During a user trial on 20 January 2009, BrahMos was tested with a new navigation system but it failed to hit the target. BrahMos Aerospace Corporation's director Dr A. Sivathanu Pillai said, "The missile performance was absolutely normal until the last phase, but the missile missed the target, though it maintained the direction." and that "The problem was in the software, not hardware". The Defence Research and Development Organisation (DRDO) said that there were "small hitches" in the last stage of the test firing due to delay in input of satellite navigation input to the inertial navigation system, the missile travelled for 112 seconds instead of the slated 84 seconds and fell 7 km away from the target. According to BrahMos Corporation, another test of the new missile was to be conducted within one month, but it was eventually conducted on 4 March 2009 and was deemed successful. BrahMos was test-fired again on 29 March 2009. For the test, the missile had to identify a building among a cluster of buildings in an urban environment. BrahMos successfully hit the intended target in two and a half minutes of launch. According to official sources, "The new seeker is unique and would help us to hit our targets, which are insignificant in terms of size, in a cluster of large buildings. India is now the only nation in the world with this advanced technology". After the third test, Lt Gen. Noble Thamburaj, said that the Indian Army wanted the BrahMos to achieve high standards of accuracy and congratulated the scientists on behalf of the Indian Army. The Indian Army confirmed that the test was successful and the army is satisfied with the missile. This marking the completion of the development phase of BrahMos Block-II, and it was ready for induction.

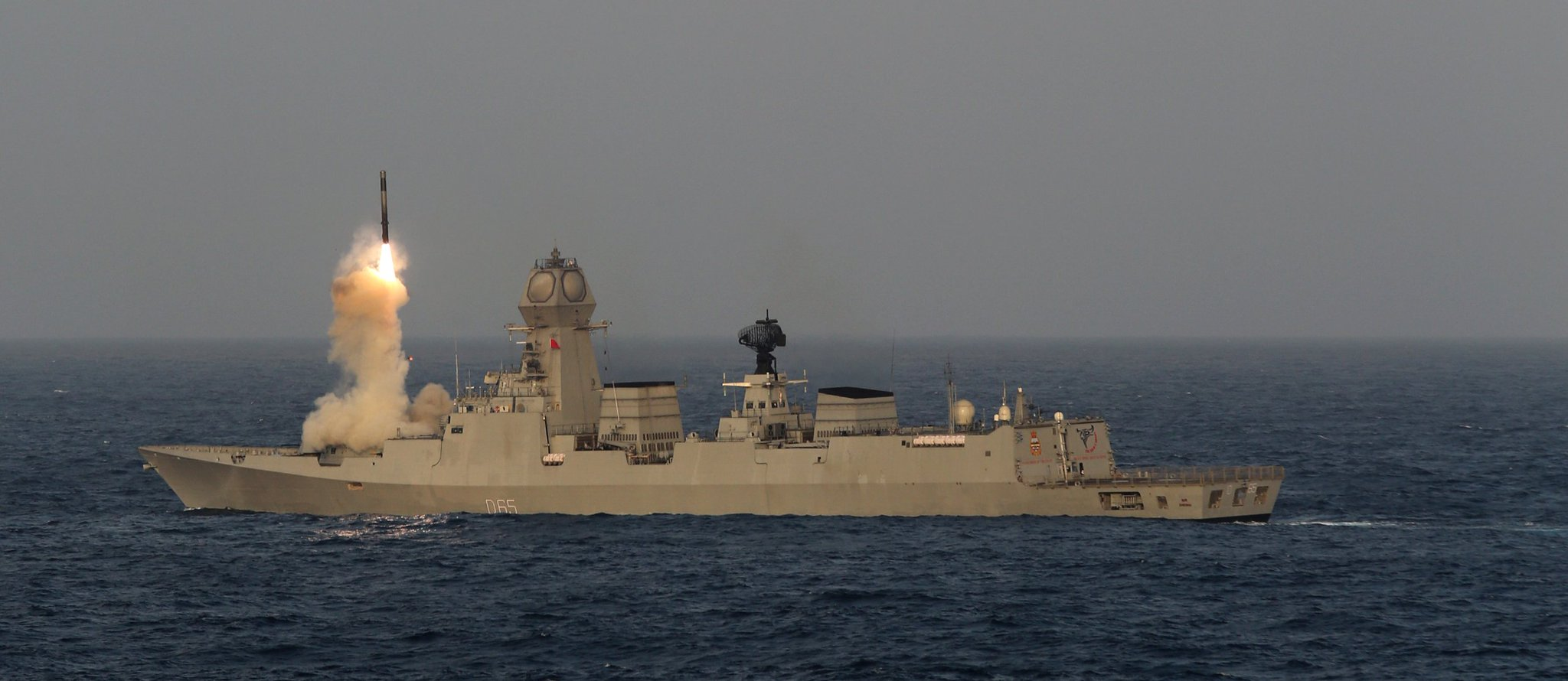
BrahMos fired from INS Chennai during TROPEX 2017

The 5 September 2010 test of BrahMos created a world record for being the first cruise missile to be tested at supersonic speeds in a steep-dive mode. The missile was test-fired from the integrated test range launching complex-3 (LC-3) at Chandipur around 11.35 am. With this launch, the Indian army's requirement for land attacks with Block-II advanced seeker software with target discriminating capabilities was met. BrahMos became the only supersonic cruise missile possessing advanced capability of selection of a particular land target amongst a group of targets, providing an edge to the user with precise hit.

Block III has advanced guidance and upgraded software, incorporating high manoeuvres at multiple points and steep dive from high altitude. It will be deployed in Arunachal Pradesh. It can engage ground targets from an altitude as low as 10 metres for surgical strikes without any collateral damage. It is capable of being launched from multiple platforms like submarines, ships, aircraft and land based Mobile Autonomous Launchers (MAL). On 12 August 2011, it was test-fired by ground forces and met all mission parameters.

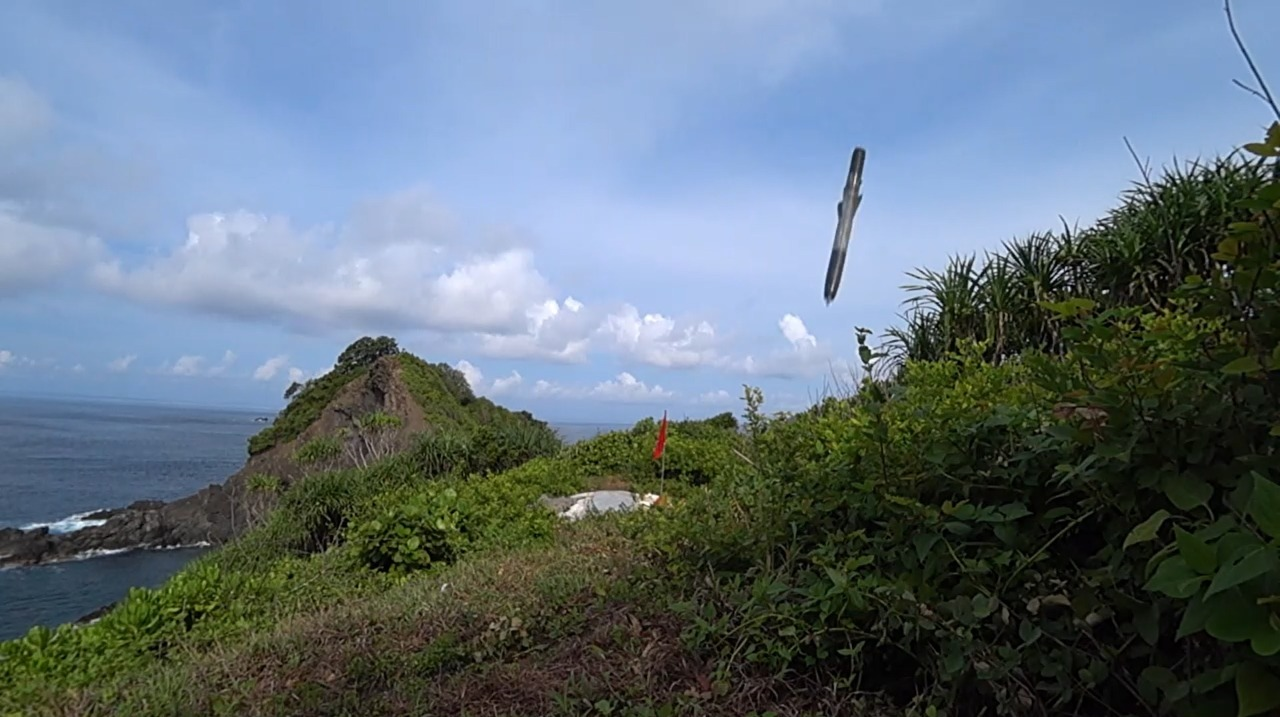
BrahMos at the moment of impact

The new navigation system uses an Indian chip called G3OM (GPS, GLONASS, GAGAN on a module). The system weighs around 17 grams, and gives accuracy below five metres using Indian, US and Russian navigation satellites. The system can be used in tandem with an inertial navigation system (INS) to provide high-accuracy targeting without using any seeker.

BrahMos was tested with an Indian seeker for the first time on 22 March 2018, and was tested with an India-developed propulsion system, airframe and power supply on 30 September 2019.

On 30 September 2020, India successfully test-fired an extended range BrahMos, offering a range of around 350 km, at speeds up to Mach 2.8, an improvement over the initial 290 km. The test was carried out under BrahMos project of the Defence Research and Development Organisation (DRDO), under which the missile was launched with an indigenous booster. The missile was launched from a land-based facility in Odisha. This is the second test-firing of the extended range version of the missile which has an indigenously developed airframe and booster.

In May 2025, a report suggested that an indigenous seeker, developed by Data Patterns, was flight-tested in BrahMos around four weeks earlier. The seeker performed in a "text book manner" and the company expected an order for te seekers soon.

=== Submarine-launched variant ===
The submarine-launched variant of BrahMos was test fired successfully for the first time from a submerged pontoon near Visakhapatnam at the coast of Bay of Bengal on 20 March 2013. This was the first vertical launch of an Indian supersonic missile from a submerged platform. The missile can be launched from a depth of 40 to 50 m (130 to 160 ft).

=== Air-launched variant ===
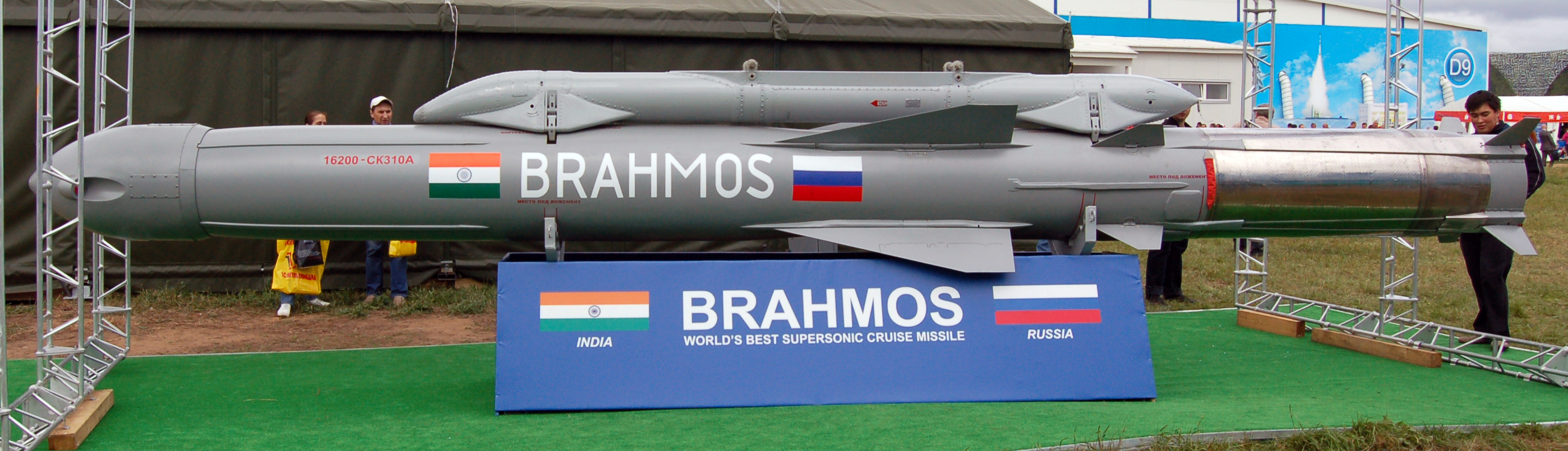
BrahMos-A displayed at MAKS 2009

==== BrahMos-A ====
The BrahMos-A is a modified air-launched variant of the missile with a range of 500 km which can be launched from a Sukhoi Su-30MKI as a standoff weapon. To reduce the missile's weight to 2.55 tons, many modifications were made like using a smaller booster, adding fins for airborne stability after launch, and relocating the connector. It can be released from the height of 500 to 14,000 metres (1,640 to 46,000 ft). After release, the missile free falls for 100–150 metres, then goes into a cruise phase at 14,000 metres and finally the terminal phase at 15 metres. BrahMos Aerospace planned to deliver the missile to the IAF in 2015, where it is expected to arm at least three squadrons.

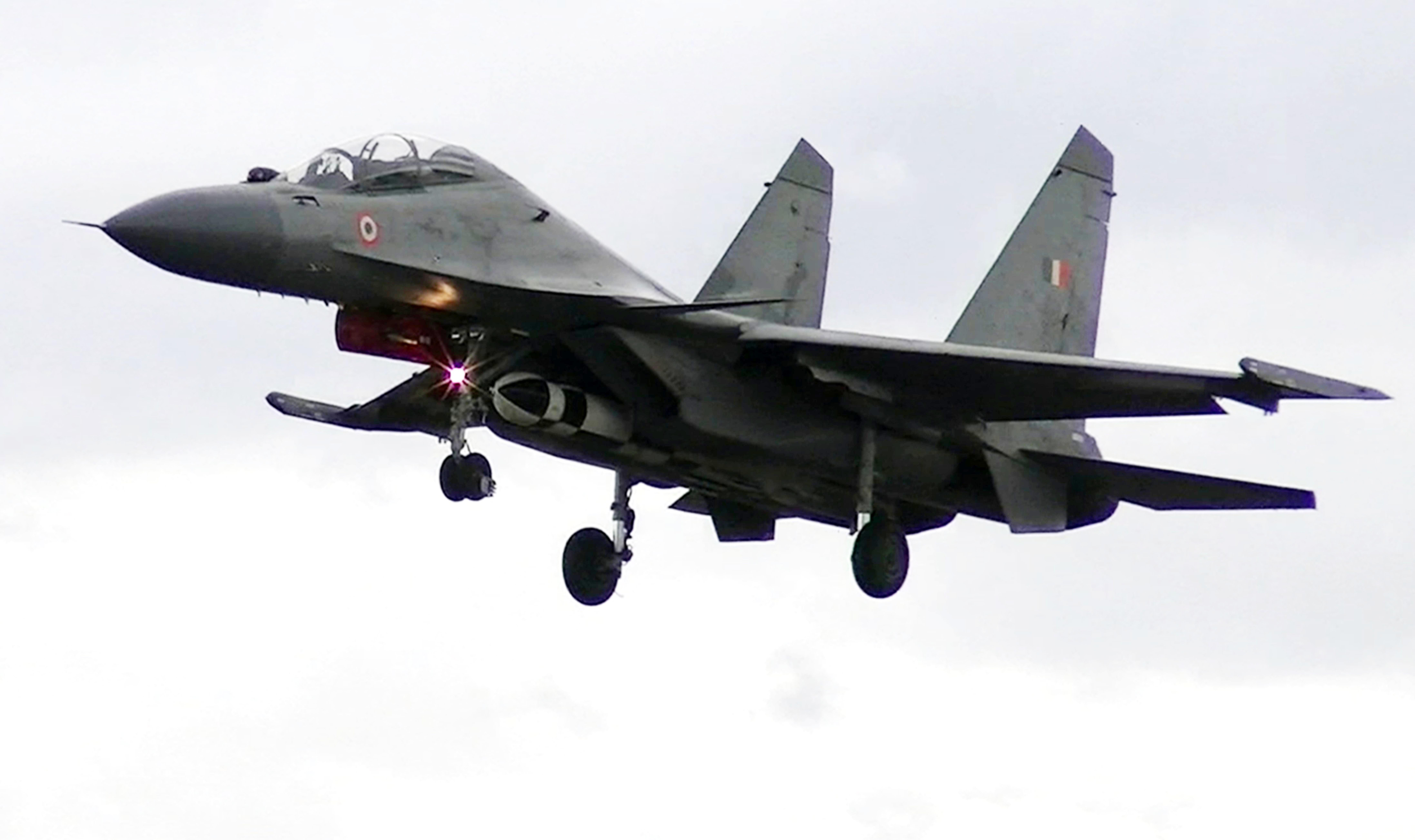
A Su-30MKI fighter armed with BrahMos

The missile was also planned to arm the Indian Navy's Ilyushin Il-38 and Tupolev Tu-142 maritime patrol and anti-submarine aircraft with 6 missiles per aircraft, but this could not be made possible due to insufficient ground clearance of the IL-38, high cost of modifying the Tu-142 and the questionable benefits of modifying an aging fleet.

An expert committee from the DRDO and the Indian Air Force (IAF) had ruled out any structural modifications to the Su-30MKI to carry the missile. On 22 October 2008, A. Sivathanu Pillai, Chief Controller, R&D, DRDO and CEO and managing director of BrahMos Aerospace, announced that trials and tests were to be carried out by 2011, and the IAF would get its own version of BrahMos by 2012.

On 10 January 2009, it was reported that two Indian Air Force Su-30MKI fighter jets were sent to Russia for a retrofit program that would enable them to launch the missile. On 8 August 2009, Alexander Leonov, Director of the Russian Machine Building Research and Production Centre, said "we are ready for test launches." He also said that a new takeoff engine for the launching of the missile in air and at extremely high altitudes had been developed, and the initial test firing of the missile would be undertaken from the Su-30 MKI but did not specify the dates. On 26 February 2012, A. Sivathanu Pillai said that the air-launched version of BrahMos is being developed and will be tested by the end of 2012. This version of the BrahMos missile will use air-breathing scramjet propulsion technology and would be more fuel-efficient than a traditional rocket-powered missile.

The purchase of over 200 air-launched BrahMos supersonic cruise missiles for the IAF was cleared by the Cabinet Committee on Security (CCS) on 19 October 2012, at the cost of ₹6,000 crore (equivalent to ₹120 billion or US$1 billion in 2026). This would include funds for the integration and testing of the BrahMos on Su-30MKI of the IAF. As per this plan, the first test of the air-launched version of the missile was to be conducted by December 2012. Two Su-30MKI of the IAF would be modified by the Hindustan Aeronautics Limited (HAL) at its Nashik facility where they will also be integrated with the missile's aerial launcher.

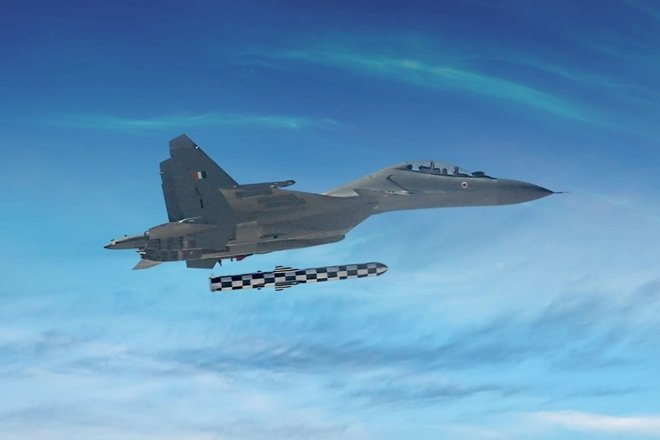
Su-30MKI with BrahMos-ER

A demonstration flight was carried out at HAL Nashik on 25 June 2016 as a modified Su-30MKI carrying BrahMos-A underwent a successful trial flight, the first time a heavyweight supersonic cruise missile had been integrated on a long-range fighter aircraft; the project to adapt the weapon for air launch was approved in 2011, but was bogged down with technology transfer and intellectual property rights concerns. To carry the missile, the Su-30MKI undercarriage had to be strengthened, which also required new hard points and structural modifications. The cost of adapting the BrahMos for air launch was "phenomenal", but efforts to downsize the missile were abandoned after an attempt to reduce the size of the ramjet. On 22 November 2017, the missile was successfully test fired for the first time from a Sukhoi-30MKI against a sea-based target in the Bay of Bengal. This made the Indian Air Force the first in the world to have successfully tested such a type of air launched trisonic-class missile on a sea-based target. After the IAF successfully tested BrahMos from a Su-30MKI against a sea-based target, it declared on 17 December 2019 that the integration of BrahMos-A on Su-30 MKI is completed.

50 IAF SU-30MKI will be modified to carry the BrahMos-A missile, these modified Su-30MKIs will have electronic circuits capable of withstanding nuclear electromagnetic pulse. According to the CEO of BrahMos Aerospace, Sudhir Kumar Mishra, BrahMos-A can reach targets thousands of kilometres away considering the range of launch aircraft. On 20 January 2020, the IAF commissioned its first squadron of Su-30MKI fighters equipped with the BrahMos-A missile. IAF plans to procure 200 BrahMos-A missiles.

On 6 April 2021, the contract for the air-launched BrahMos-ER was signed, and two successful live firings were conducted from Su-30MKI against a land target and a sea target, respectively. IAF test fired BrahMos-A from Su-30MKI on 8 December 2021 and is now ready to enter mass production. The test validated the structural integrity and functional performance. Major airframe assemblies such as non-metallic air frame sections comprising ramjet fuel tank and pneumatic fuel supply system which form the integral part of the Ramjet Engine are now locally developed.

== Testing ==
List of tests across all variants
No	Date	Variant tested	User	Result	Location	Platform	Comments	Reference
1	12 Jun 2001	SSM – Block I		Success	Integrated Test Range		Tested in vertical configuration	
2	28 Apr 2002	SSM – Block I		Success	Integrated Test Range		Tested on an inclined plane	
3	12 February 2003	ASM		Success	Bay of Bengal	INS Rajput		
4	29 Oct 2003	SSM – Block I		Success	Integrated Test Range			
5	9 Nov 2003	SSM – Block I		Success	Integrated Test Range	Mobile launcher		
6	23 Nov 2003	ASM		Success	Bay of Bengal	INS Rajput	Fired from a moving ship at a decommissioned vessel	
7	13 Jun 2004	SSM – Block I		Success	Integrated Test Range	Mobile launcher	First production missile integrated at BrahMos Integration Complex, Hyderabad	
8	3 Nov 2004	ASM		Success	Bay of Bengal	INS Rajput		
9	21 Dec 2004	SSM		Success	Pokhran Test Range	Mobile launcher	First test of land-attack version	
10	15 Apr 2005	ASM	Indian Navy	Success	Arabian Sea	INS Rajput		
11	30 Nov 2005	SSM	Indian Army	Success	Integrated Test Range	Mobile launcher		
12	31 May 2006	SSM	Indian Army	Success	Pokhran Test Range	Mobile launcher		
13	16 Apr 2007	SSM	Indian Army	Success	Integrated Test Range	Mobile launcher	First test with the "S" maneuver	
14	22 Apr 2007	SSM	Indian Army	Success	Integrated Test Range	Mobile launcher		
15	5 March 2008	LACM	Indian Navy	Success	Andaman & Nicobar Islands	INS Rajput	First test of the land attack variant	
16	18 Dec 2008	ASM	Indian Navy	Success	Bay of Bengal	INS Ranvir	First test from a VLS	
17	20 January 2009	SSM – Block II	Indian Army	Failure	Pokhran Test Range	Mobile launcher	Failed to correctly discriminate target located within a cluster	
18	4 Mar 2009	SSM – Block II	Indian Army	Success	Pokhran Test Range	Mobile launcher	First successful test in a target discriminatory role	
19	29 Mar 2009	SSM – Block II	Indian Army	Success	Pokhran Test Range	Mobile launcher		
20	29 Jul 2009	SSM – Block II	Indian Army	Success	Pokhran Test Range	Mobile launcher		
21	21 Mar 2010	ASM	Indian Navy	Success	Orissa	INS Ranvir	Tested on decommissioned INS Meen	
22	5 Sep 2010	SSM – Block II		Success	Integrated Test Range	Mobile launcher		
23	2 Dec 2010	SSM – Block III	Indian Army	Success	Integrated Test Range	Mobile launcher		
24	12 Aug 2011	SSM – Block III	Indian Army	Success	Pokhran Test Range	Mobile launcher		
25	4 Mar 2012	SSM – Block II	Indian Army	Success	Pokhran Test Range	Mobile launcher	Operational test of the second army regiment	
26	28 Mar 2012	SSM – Block III	Indian Army	Success	Integrated Test Range	Mobile launcher		
27	30 Mar 2012		DRDO	Success	Integrated Test Range	Mobile launcher		
28	29 Jul 2012		DRDO	Failure	Integrated Test Range	Mobile launcher	Developmental flight test with 25 new subsystems and components	
29	7 Oct 2012	ASM	Indian Navy	Success	Arabian Sea	INS Teg	Tested with a GLONASS navigation system derived from Kh-101	
30	9 January 2013	ASM	Indian Navy	Success	Bay of Bengal	Naval ship	Tested with double maneuver in "S" form	
31	20 Mar 2013	SLCM	DRDO	Success	Visakhapatnam	Underwater pontoon	First test from a submerged platform	
32	22 May 2013	ASM	Indian Navy	Success	Goa	INS Tarkash	Acceptance Test Firing	
33	18 Nov 2013	SSM – Block III	Indian Army	Success	Pokhran Test Range	Mobile launcher	Destroyed a hardened target	
34	7 February 2014	ASM	Indian Navy	Success	Arabian Sea	INS Trikand	2 missiles test fired in salvo mode	
35	7 Apr 2014	SSM – Block III	Indian Army	Success	Pokhran Test Range	Mobile launcher	Tested in steep dive-cum-target discrimination mode	
36	9 Jun 2014	ASM	Indian Navy	Success	Karwar	INS Kolkata		
37	8 Jul 2014	SSM	Indian Army	Success	Integrated Test Range	Mobile launcher	First test with advanced guidance system and indigenously built software algorithm	
38	1 Nov 2014	ASM	Indian Navy	Success	Arabian Sea	INS Kochi		
39	14 February 2015	ASM	Indian Navy	Success	Goa	INS Kolkata		
40	9 Apr 2015	SSM	Indian Army	Failure	Car Nicobar	Mobile launcher		
41	8 May 2015	SSM	Indian Army	Success	Car Nicobar	Mobile launcher		
42	7 Nov 2015	SSM	Indian Army	Success	Pokhran Test Range	Mobile launcher		
43	27 May 2016	SSM	IAF	Success	Pokhran Test Range	Mobile launcher		
44	6 February 2017	ASM	Indian Navy	Success	Arabian Sea	INS Chennai		
45	11 Mar 2017	Extended range	–	Success	Integrated Test Range	–	First test of the extended range	
46	21 Apr 2017	LACM	Indian Navy	Success	Bay of Bengal	INS Teg		
47	2–3 May 2017	SSM – Block III	Indian Army	Success	Andaman & Nicobar Islands	Mobile launcher	2 missiles tested in top attack configuration	
48	22 Nov 2017	ALCM	Indian Air Force / DRDO	Success	Bay of Bengal	Su-30MKI	First test of the air launched variant	
49	22 Mar 2018	SSM	Indian Army	Success	Pokhran Test Range	–	First test with indigenous seeker	
50	21 May 2018	SSM	DRDO	Success	Integrated Test Range	Mobile launcher	Validated "life extension" technologies	
51	22 May 2018	SSM	DRDO	Success	Integrated Test Range	Mobile launcher	Tested Indian fuel management system and a few non-metallic airframe components	
52	16 Jul 2018	SSM	DRDO / Indian Army	Success	Integrated Test Range	Mobile launcher	Tested to validate service life extension of the missile under extreme weather conditions	
53	7 Jul 2019	Block-II	DRDO	Success	–	–	Tested the vertical steep dive version.	
54	30 Sep 2019	SSM	DRDO	Success	Integrated Test Range	Mobile launcher	Tested with India-developed propulsion system, airframe and power supply.	
55	21-21 Oct 2019	SSM	IAF	Success	Andaman and Nicobar Islands	Mobile Launcher	Twin firings was carried out as a part of the routine operational training.; The missile engaged the designated mock targets close to 300 km away with a direct hit on the ground target in both cases with pinpoint accuracy from a mobile platform.	
56	17 Dec 2019	SSM	DRDO-IAF	Success	Integrated Test Range	Mobile launcher	Launch Complex 3 (8:30 am)	
57	17 Dec 2019	ALCM-AShM	DRDO-IAF	Success	Kalaikunda AFS/Bay of Bengal	Su-30MKI		
58	30 October 2020	ALCM; AShM	IAF	Success	Bay of Bengal	Su-30MKI (222 squadron)	A sinking ship hit after the Su-30MKI flew for over three hours from an IAF base in Punjab while being refuelled mid-air.	
59	8 Dec 2021	ALCM	IAF	Success	Integrated Test Range	Su-30MKI	Validated structural integrity and functional performance. Cleared for serial production.	
60	11 January 2022	ASM	Indian Navy	Success		INS Visakhapatnam (D66)	Certifies the accuracy of the ship's combat system and armament complex and also validates a new capability of the missile.	
61	20 January 2022		DRDO	Success	Integrated Test Range	Mobile launcher	Improved variant with more indigenous content	
62	1 February 2022	AShM	Indian Navy	Success	Andaman and Nicobar Islands	Mobile launcher		
63	18 February 2022	AShM	Indian Navy	Success	Bay of Bengal	INS Visakhapatnam		
64	5 Mar 2022	SSM	Indian Navy	Success		INS Chennai	Extended-range land-attack BrahMos variant tested.	
65	23 Mar 2022	SSM	Andaman and Nicobar command	Success	Andaman and Nicobar Islands	Mobile launcher	Extended range version tested.	
66	19 Apr 2022	ASM and ALCM	IAF and Indian Navy	Success	Bay of Bengal	Su-30MKI and INS Delhi	Air-launched version fired at a decommissioned ship. SSM version tested from INS Delhi from an upgraded modular launcher.	
67	27 Apr 2022	AShM	Indian Navy and A&N command	Success	A&N Island	Mobile launcher		
68	12 May 2022	ALCM	IAF and DRDO	Success	Bay of Bengal	Sukhoi Su-30MKI	IAF and DRDO tested extended range version of BrahMos missile from Su-30 MKI, hit the target precisely.	
69	29 Nov 2022	SSM	Indian Army	Success	A&N Island	Mobile launcher		
70	29 Dec 2022	ALCM; AShM	IAF	Success	Bay of Bengal	Su-30MKI	ER Version of BrahMos Air Launched missile against a Ship Target	
71	5 Mar 2023	AShM	Indian Navy	Success	Arabian Sea	Naval Ship		
72	14 May 2023	AShM	Indian Navy	Success		INS Mormugao (D67)		
73	18 Oct 2023	ALCM	IAF	Success	A&N Island	Su-30MKI		
74	22 Nov 2023	ER-AShM	Indian Navy	Success	Arabian Sea	INS Imphal (D68)		
75	24 January 2024	ER-LACM	Indian Navy and BAPL	Success	Bay of Bengal	INS Ranvir or INS Ranvijay		
76	2 April 2024	ER-LACM	Indian Army	Success	A&N Island	Mobile launcher	Conducted by Eastern Command	
77	17 January 2025	ER-LACM	Indian Army	Success	A&N Island	Mobile launcher	Conducted by XXI Corps, Southern Command	
78	1 December 2025	ER-LACM	Indian Army	Success	A&N Island	Mobile launcher	Conducted by a BrahMos unit under the Southern Command and elements of Andaman and Nicobar Command.	
79	30 October 2026	ALCM; AShM	IAF	Success	Bay of Bengal	Su-30MKI	Conducted test against ship target	

== Specifications ==
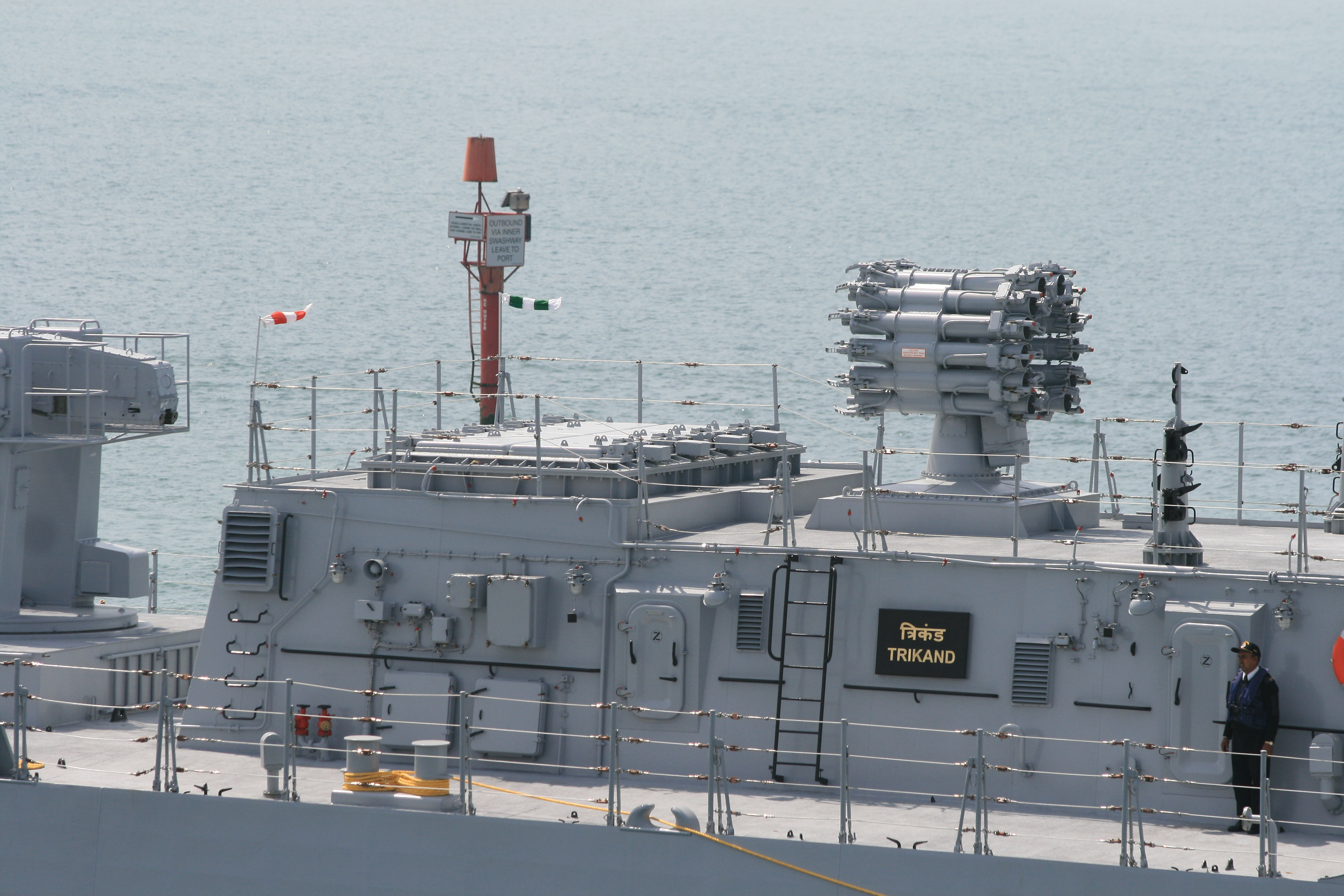
Vertical Launch System for BrahMos on INS Trikand

BrahMos has the capability of attacking surface targets by flying as low as five metres in altitude and the maximum altitude it can fly is 15,000 metres. It has a diameter of 70 cm and a wingspan of 1.7 m. It can gain a speed of Mach 3.5, and has a maximum range of 650 km. The ship-launched and land-based missiles can carry a 200 kg warhead, whereas the aircraft-launched variant (BrahMos A) can carry a 300 kg warhead. It has a two-stage propulsion system, with a solid-propellant rocket for initial acceleration and a liquid-fuelled ramjet responsible for sustained supersonic cruise. Air-breathing ramjet propulsion is much more fuel-efficient than rocket propulsion, giving the BrahMos a longer range than a pure rocket-powered missile would achieve. The propulsion systems of BrahMos is supplied by Solar Defence and Aerospace Limited (SDAL), Nagpur.

The high speed of the BrahMos likely gives it better target-penetration characteristics than lighter subsonic cruise-missiles, such as Tomahawk. Being twice as heavy and almost four times as fast as Tomahawk, the BrahMos has more than 32 times the on-cruise kinetic energy of a Tomahawk missile, although it carries only 3/5 the payload and a fraction of the range, which suggests that the missile was designed with a different tactical role. Its Mach 2.8 speed means that it cannot be intercepted by some existing missile defence systems and its precision makes it lethal to water targets.

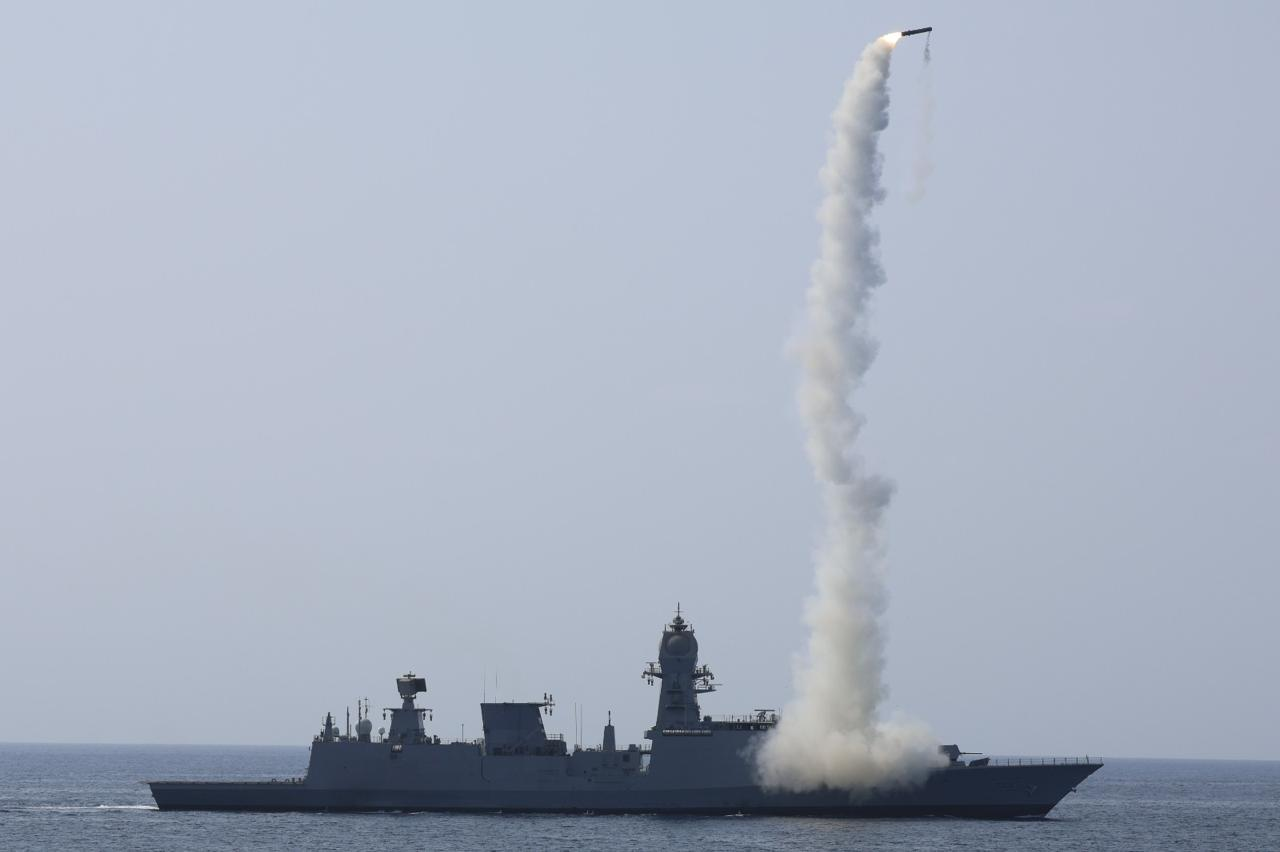
INS Nilgiri firing BrahMos.

Although BrahMos was primarily an anti-ship missile, the BrahMos Block III can also engage land-based targets. It can be launched either in a vertical or inclined position and is capable of covering targets over a 360-degree horizon. The BrahMos missile has an identical configuration for land, sea, and sub-sea platforms. The air-launched version has a smaller booster and additional tail fins for added stability during launch. The BrahMos has currently been configured for aerial deployment with the Su-30MKI as its carrier. On 5 September 2010 BrahMos created a record for the first supersonic steep dive. The BrahMos missile also utilises a "fire-and-forget" system, requiring no additional input from the operator once the missile has been launched.

== Variants ==
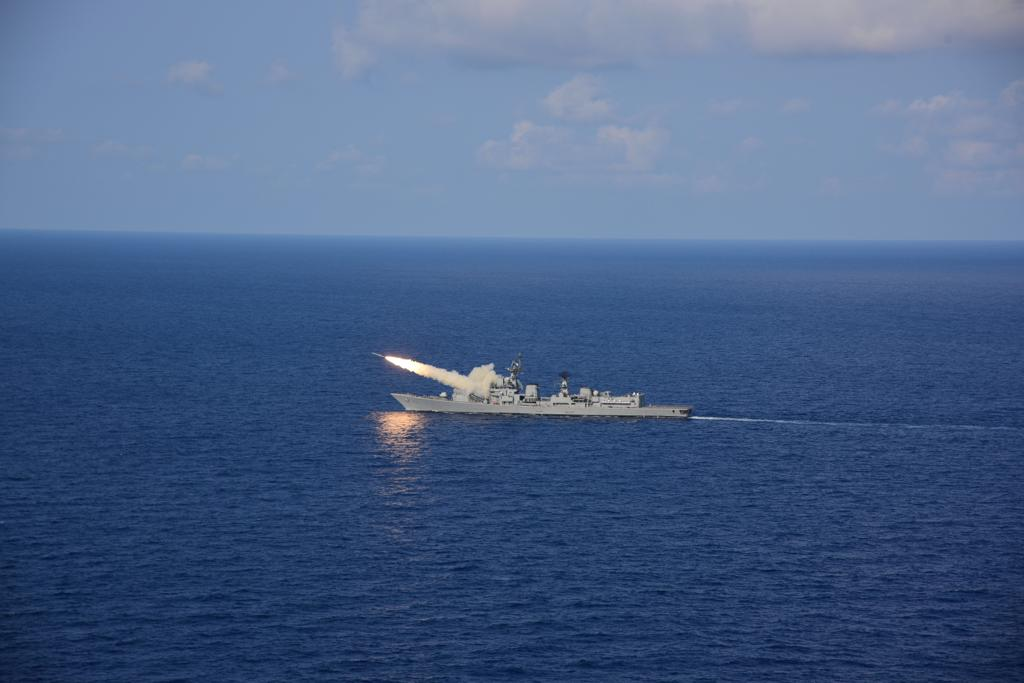
INS Delhi fires BrahMos missile

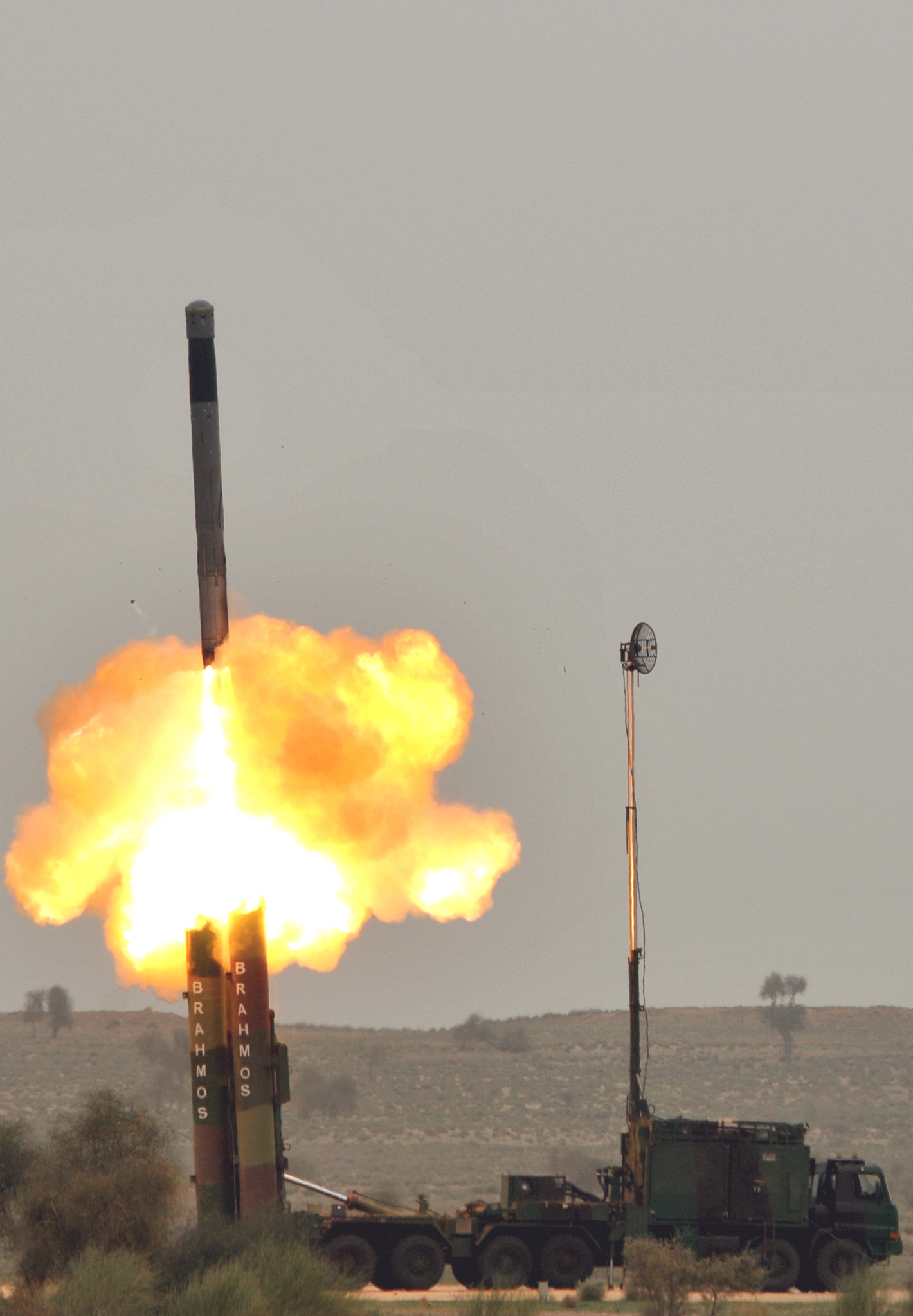
BrahMos Block-III test fired

=== Surface-launched (Block I) ===
- Ship-launched, anti-ship variant (operational)
- Ship-launched, land-attack variant (operational)
- Land-launched, land-attack variant (operational)
- Land-launched, anti-ship variant (in induction)

=== Surface-launched (Upgraded) ===
- BrahMos Block II land-attack variant (operational)
- BrahMos Block III land-variant (in induction)
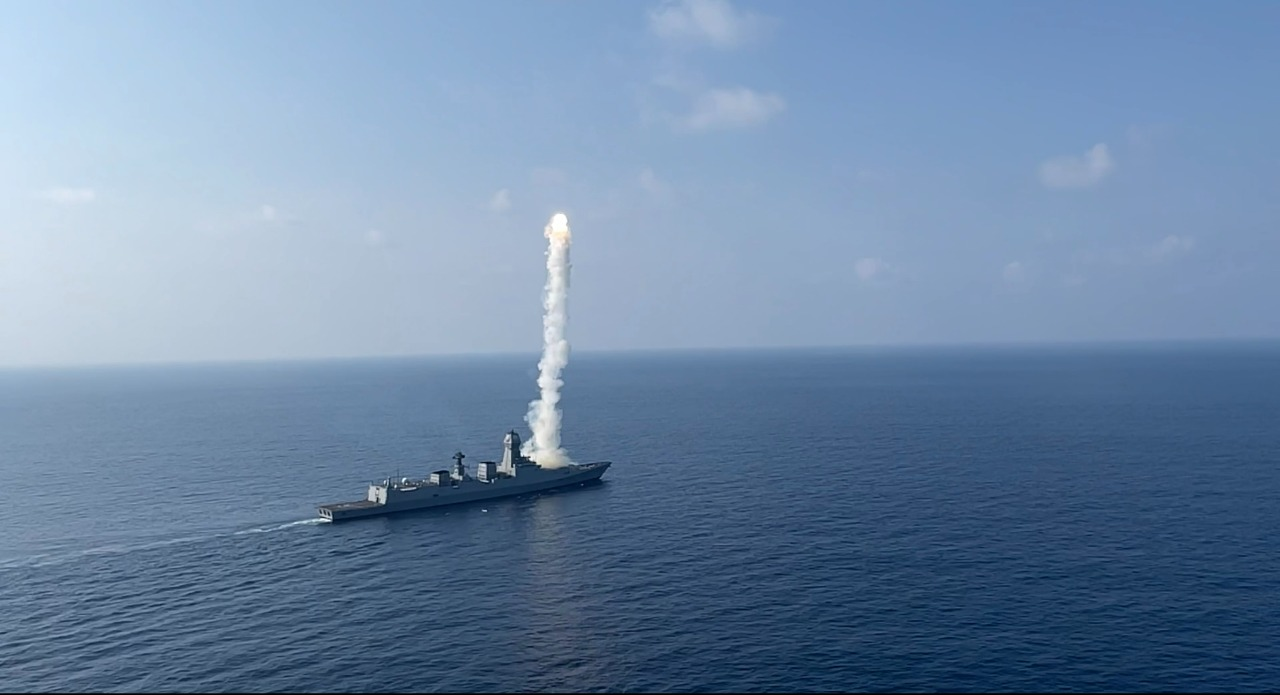
  INS Chennai firing a BrahMos missile
- Anti-aircraft carrier variant (tested in March 2012) – the missile gained the capability to attack aircraft carriers using the supersonic vertical dive variant of the missile that could travel up to 290 km.

=== Air-launched ===
- Air-launched, anti-ship variant (operational)
- Air-launched, land-attack variant (operational)

=== Submarine-launched ===
- Submarine-launched, anti-ship variant
- Submarine-launched, land-attack variant

=== Extended Range ===
In 2016, India became a member of the MTCR. India and Russia are now planning to jointly develop a new generation of BrahMos missiles with 400, 800 and even 1500 km-plus range and an ability to hit protected targets with pinpoint accuracy.

In its March 2024 order for 220 units of the missile, the Indian Navy has reportedly sought the 800 km ranged variant of the BrahMos. As of October 2025, the 800 km ranged variant is under trials and most of its development have completed, including the modified ramjet motor. The development is expected to be completed by 2027-end. After this, the existing 450 km range BrahMos, including those in service with the Navy could be modified to extend their range to 800 km. The procedure would include changes in the software, the graphical user interface of the fire control system and others. While the Army and Navy will induct the missile earlier, the air-launched variant will take more time to be developed. The ground-launched variant when in service with the Army, will be part of the proposed Integrated Rocket Force (IRF).

== Further developments ==
=== BrahMos-NG ===
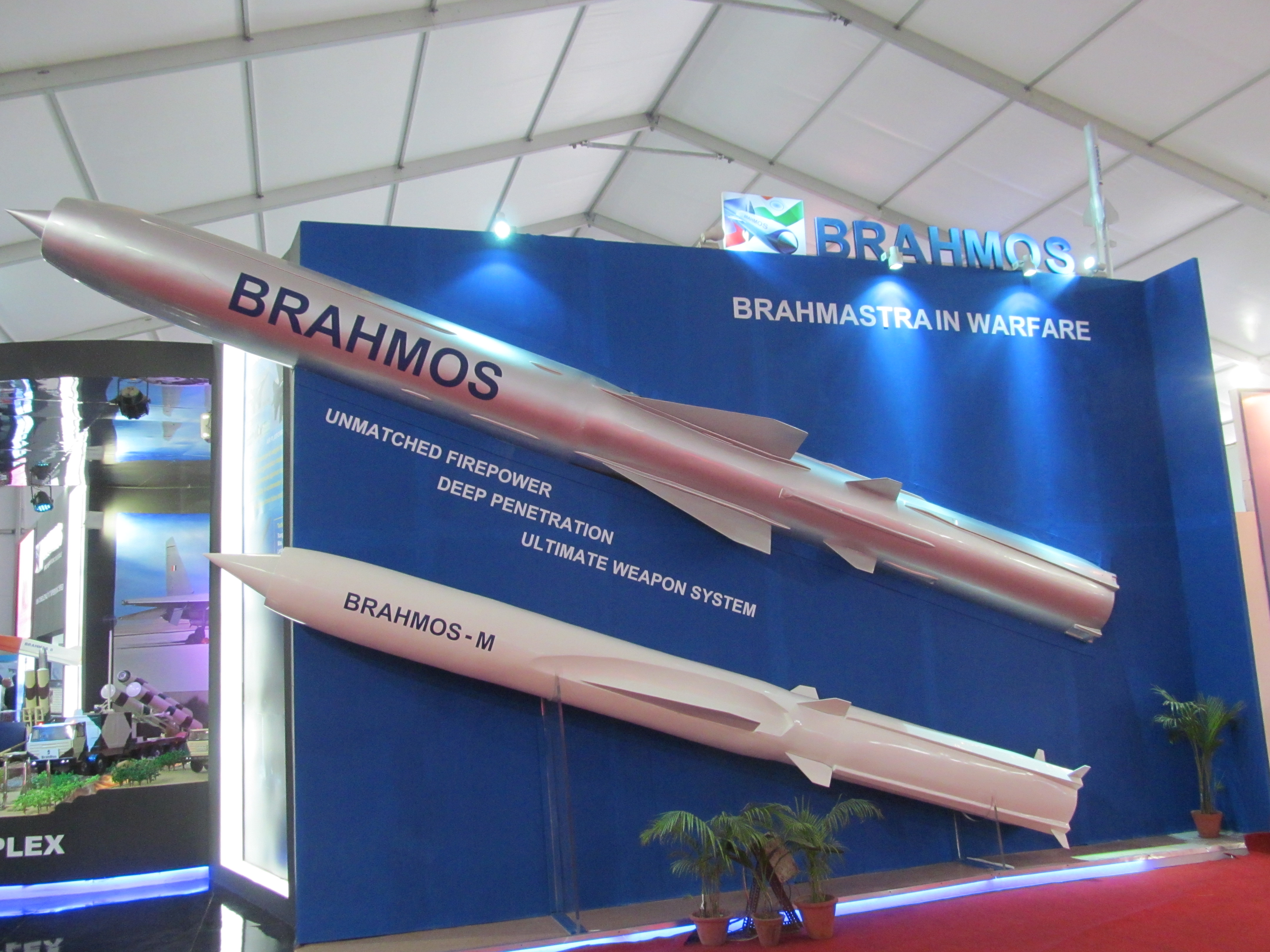
Size comparison between BrahMos and the planned BrahMos-M/BrahMos-NG.

BrahMos-NG (Next Generation) or BrahMos-MA is a shortened version based on the existing BrahMos system. A model of the new variant was revealed on 20 February 2013, at the 15th anniversary celebrations of BrahMos Corporation. It will maintain range of 290 km and speed of Mach 3.5 but will weigh around 1.5 tons, with a length of 6 metres and a diameter of 50 cm, making it 50% lighter and three metres shorter than its predecessor. The first test flight was expected to take place in late 2024 induction by the end of 2025. BrahMos-NG will have lesser radar cross section (RCS) compared to its predecessor, making it harder for air defense systems to detect and engage the target. BrahMos-NG will have Air-launched and Submarine torpedo tube/VLS-launched variants. The missile has been designated as BrahMos-M, BrahMos-NG and BrahMos-MA over the years. Additionally, the BrahMos-NG will have an AESA radar rather than the mechanically scanned one on the BrahMos.

The missile will arm the Sukhoi Su-30MKI, Mikoyan MiG-29K, HAL Tejas, including Dassault Rafale, and HAL Tejas Mk 2 in later stages. Submarine launched variant will be capable of being fired from the new P75I class of submarines. The Sukhoi Su-30MKI would carry three missiles while other combat aircraft would carry one each.

BrahMos Aerospace will manufacture BrahMos-NG in Uttar Pradesh. The Indian Air Force already confirmed a requirement of 400 missiles that will cost around ₹8,000 crore and be delivered within 5 years of time period. At the World Defense Show in February 2024, BrahMos Export Director Pravin Pathak disclosed that the initial flight samples of the BrahMos-NG will be gathered for flight testing concurrently with the building of the manufacturing factory, with an anticipated launch date of late 2025 or early 2026.

In August 2024, co-director of the project, Alexander Maksichev revealed that the flight trials of BrahMos-MA will begin in 2026 and the company is now engaged in preparing the detailed design documents. This difference in timeline and name designation, however, led to a question that whether India and Russian projects are different.

=== BrahMos-II ===
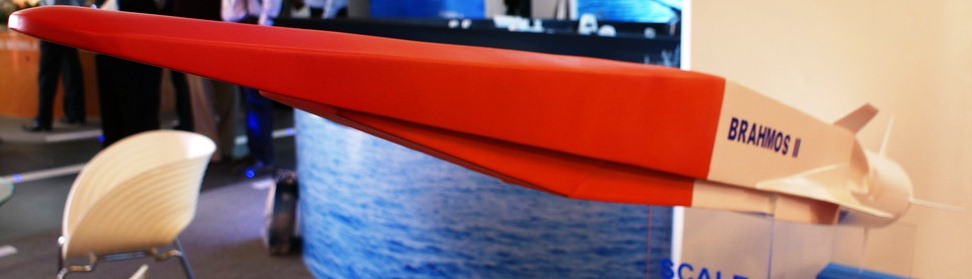
Model of the BrahMos-II at Aero India 2013

BrahMos-II is a hypersonic cruise missile currently under development, expected to have characteristics similar to the 3M22 Zircon. Development could take 7–8 years to complete.

=== UCAV variant ===
The former President of India, A. P. J. Abdul Kalam asked BrahMos Aerospace to develop an advanced version of the BrahMos cruise missile to maintain India's lead in the field. He stated that a hypersonic version of BrahMos would be needed that could deliver its payload and return to base.

== Combat Use ==
2020-2021 China-India Skirmishes

In 2020, India deployed BrahMos along with long range cruise missile Nirbhay and Akash surface to air missile to deter Chinese aggression along the Line of Actual Control in eastern Ladakh.

=== 2025 India–Pakistan conflict ===
It was reported that India used BrahMos missiles as part of its Operation Sindoor on 7 May 2025 against suspected militant targets and training camps at 9 locations inside Pakistan. On 10 May 2025, India reportedly used BrahMos missiles from Sukhoi Su-30MKI in precision strikes on Pakistani airbases during the 2025 India–Pakistan conflict. Pakistan's Prime Minister, Shehbaz Sharif, while speaking at an event in Azerbaijan on the 29th of May said that his armed forces were planning to retaliate against India at 4:30 in the morning of May 10 but before that hour even arrived, India used BrahMos missile to strike 11 PAF airbases including PAF Base Nur Khan (Chaklala, near Islamabad), Rafiqui, Murid, Sukkur, Sialkot, Pasrur, Chunian, Sargodha, Skardu, Bholari and Jacobabad in a coordinated attack. His admission confirms that Pakistan was unable to intercept the BrahMos missiles, launched either by the Indian Air Force or the Indian Army. The use of BrahMos was confirmed by the Indian Prime Minister Narendra Modi in a speech at Kanpur on 30 May 2025.

A Pakistani politician, Rana Sanaullah, admitted that Pakistan's military had only about 30 to 45 seconds to assess whether the BrahMos missiles fired by India at the Nur Khan Airbase carried a nuclear warhead which could have further escalated the situation towards a nuclear conflict.

Earlier, during the 2025 India–Pakistan crisis, multiple Indian Naval Ships undertook several successful anti-ship firings in the Arabian Sea to revalidate the preparedness of platforms, systems, and crew for long-range, precise offensive strikes.

== Operational history ==
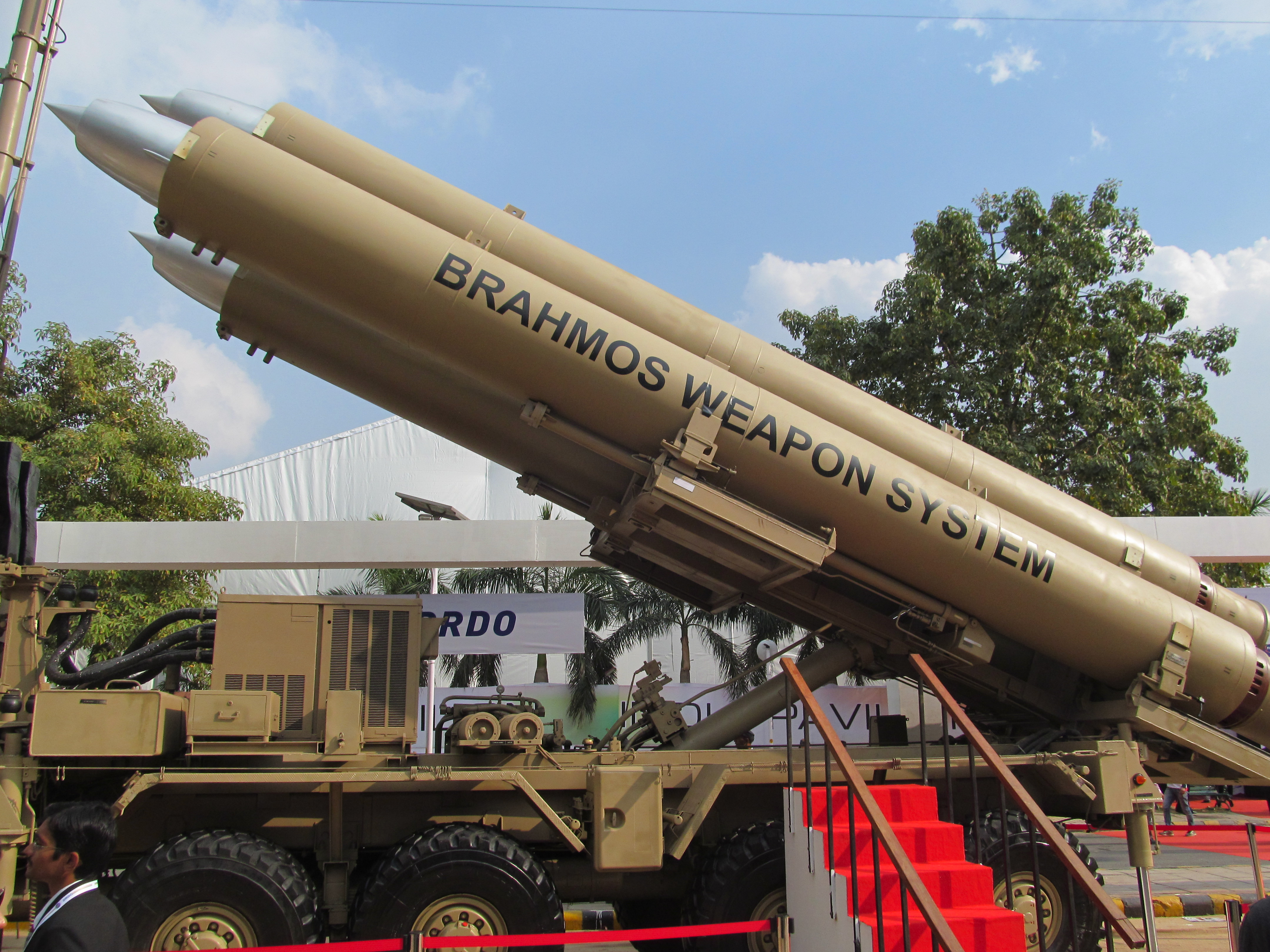
Side view of the MAL's missiles

=== India ===
==== Indian Army ====
===== First Regiment =====
On 21 June 2007, the Indian Army raised its first BrahMos regiment, designated 861 Missile Regiment, equipped with Block-I variant. Before the induction, four tests were conducted successfully including two by Army personnel. The induction took place one year before scheduled delivery in July 2008. Two mobile launchers and mobile command post was delivered. The first regiment with five mobile launcher cost $83 million to set up.

===== Second Regiment =====
By 2009, after multiple tests, Block-II variant of the missile with advanced seeker was ready for induction. This will be followed by raising of two regiments of Block-II BrahMos Weapon System. Around 260 missiles would be bought. The deal would cost over ₹8,000 crore (equivalent to ₹220 billion or US$2.3 billion in 2026).

On 9 November 2011, the second regiment equipped with BrahMos Block-II was officially commissioned with 16 weapon systems. The delivery was completed ahead of schedule. Reports also confirmed that two more regiments were also planned including one equipped with Block-III variant.

On 4 March 2012, the Army test fired a BrahMos missile at the Pokhran Field Firing Range. Following this, the second regiment of BrahMos, meant for desert warfare, was operationalised. The third regiment was already on order and would be inducted in Arunachal Pradesh. Each of the two new regiments would have 65 missiles, five Mobile Autonomous Launchers and two mobile command post. The development was confirmed by the then Indian Defence Minister A. K. Antony in a written reply in the Parliament.

===== Third Regiment =====
In 2015, Indian Army activated the third regiment of BrahMos Block-II missiles, designated 344 Missile Regiment. The regiment which took part in the Republic Day Parade in 2025 was the latest BrahMos regiment.

===== Fourth Regiment =====
On 3 August 2016, it was reported that the Cabinet Committee on Security (CCS) cleared a fourth regiment for the 'steep-dive' (Block-III) variant of the BrahMos missile at a cost of ₹4,300 crore (equivalent to ₹67 billion or US$700 million in 2026). The regiment would have 100 missiles, 5 mobile autonomous launchers on 12×12 heavy-duty trucks and a mobile command post. The regiment would be deployed in northeast region along the Line of Actual Control. These missiles have a steep dive capability of up to 75° which would be increased to 90°. As of then, the Army had inducted three regiments of Block I and II variants since 2007.

As of April 2018, the Indian Army's fourth BrahMos regiment was under formation in Ladakh region.

On 20 March 2025, it was reported that the Defence Acquisition Council (DAC) had cleared the procurement of additional regiments equipped with BrahMos-ER missiles worth around ₹20,000 crore (equivalent to ₹210 billion or US$2.1 billion in 2026). The DAC will meet on 27 March 2026 during which it is expected to clear the Indian Army's plan to purchase large number of extended range BrahMos missiles.

==== Indian Air Force ====
- Thanjavur AFS: 47 Wing
  - No. 222 Squadron (Tigersharks) (Air launched BrahMos)

The Indian Air Force also operates surface launched (transporter erector launcher) variants. The number of TELs in service with IAF is unknown. The land based weapons complex was inducted into the force in December 2014. The variants were test fired once from the Pokhran Test Range in 2016, twice from the Trak Island, Nicobar Islands in October 2019 as part of a training missions and once from the Integrated Test Range Launch Complex 3 in December 2019 along with an air-launched anti-ship missile.

As of July 2024, 40 Sukhoi Su-30MKIs have been modified to carry BrahMos missiles. The range of air launched BrahMos is already upgraded to 450 km and will be increased to over 800 km. Another 84 jets will be modified under the Super Sukhoi upgrade programme.

On 5 August 2025, the Defence Acquisition Council cleared the procurement of 110 BrahMos air-launched cruise missiles for the Indian Air Force at a cost of ₹10,800 crore (equivalent to ₹110 billion or US$1.2 billion in 2026).

==== Indian Navy ====
BrahMos has become the primary strike missile deployed in the Navy fleet. Most of the modern destroyers, frigates and corvettes are being equipped with the missile.

In May 2015, the Defence Acquisition Council of the Indian Ministry of Defence cleared the procurement of nine systems of BrahMos cruise missiles to equip three of the Delhi-class destroyers as well as the first batch of Talwar-class frigates at a cost of ₹2,700 crore (equivalent to ₹44 billion or US$460 million in 2026). By 2016, 10 frontline warships of the Navy were equipped with BrahMos.

On 30 March 2023, MoD inked a contract with BrahMos Aerospace Private Limited (BAPL) for procurement of Next Generation Maritime Mobile Coastal Batteries (Long Range) {NGMMCB (LR)} and BrahMos Missiles at an approximate cost of over ₹1,700 crore (equivalent to ₹19 billion or US$190 million in 2026). The delivery of NGMMCBs is scheduled to commence from 2027. Reportedly, the orders include 2 batteries. Each battery would include 4 Tatra launch vehicles, each carrying 3 BrahMos missiles, a mobile command post and a mobile tracking radar. These will be initially deployed from INS Trata in Mumbai which is a coastal missile defence battery base. The NGMMCB will replace P-15 Termit anti ship missile batteries.

On 21 February 2024, the Cabinet Committee on Security of India cleared the acquisition of over 220 BrahMos-ER for deployment on warships of the Indian Navy. A deal worth around ₹19,518.65 crore (equivalent to ₹210 billion or US$2.2 billion in 2026) for missile procurement has been signed on 1 March 2024 by BAPL and MoD along with a deal of ₹988.07 crore (equivalent to ₹11 billion or US$110 million in 2026) for shipborne BrahMos launch systems. While this was the largest BrahMos order, the Ministry of Defence placed an overall order of ₹58,000 crore (equivalent to ₹620 billion or US$6.4 billion in 2026) with the BrahMos Aerospace till date.

By December 2025, INS Vidyut (K48) had been equipped with two inclined twin BrahMos launchers with the remaining in-service Veer-class corvettes also expected to be equipped with the weapon system. The launchers were transferred from INS Rajput (D51), which is now retired. Another pair of launchers from Rajput could also be used to equip another corvette of the class.

On 5 August 2025, the Defence Acquisition Council cleared the procurement of eight BrahMos fire control systems and launchers for older Indian Navy ships at a cost of ₹650 crore (equivalent to ₹671 crore or US$70 million in 2026). By that time, 20 frontline warships were equipped with the missile system. BrahMos has become the primary conventional strike weapon for the Indian Armed Forces. The contract was signed on 6 October 2026 at a cost of ₹661.50 crore (US$69 million). The inclined launcher systems will be fitted on two Rajput-class destroyers and two Veer-class corvettes. Naval News reported INS Ranvir and INS Ranvijay as the likely recipients of the inclined launchers.

=== Philippines ===
==== Philippine Marine Corps ====
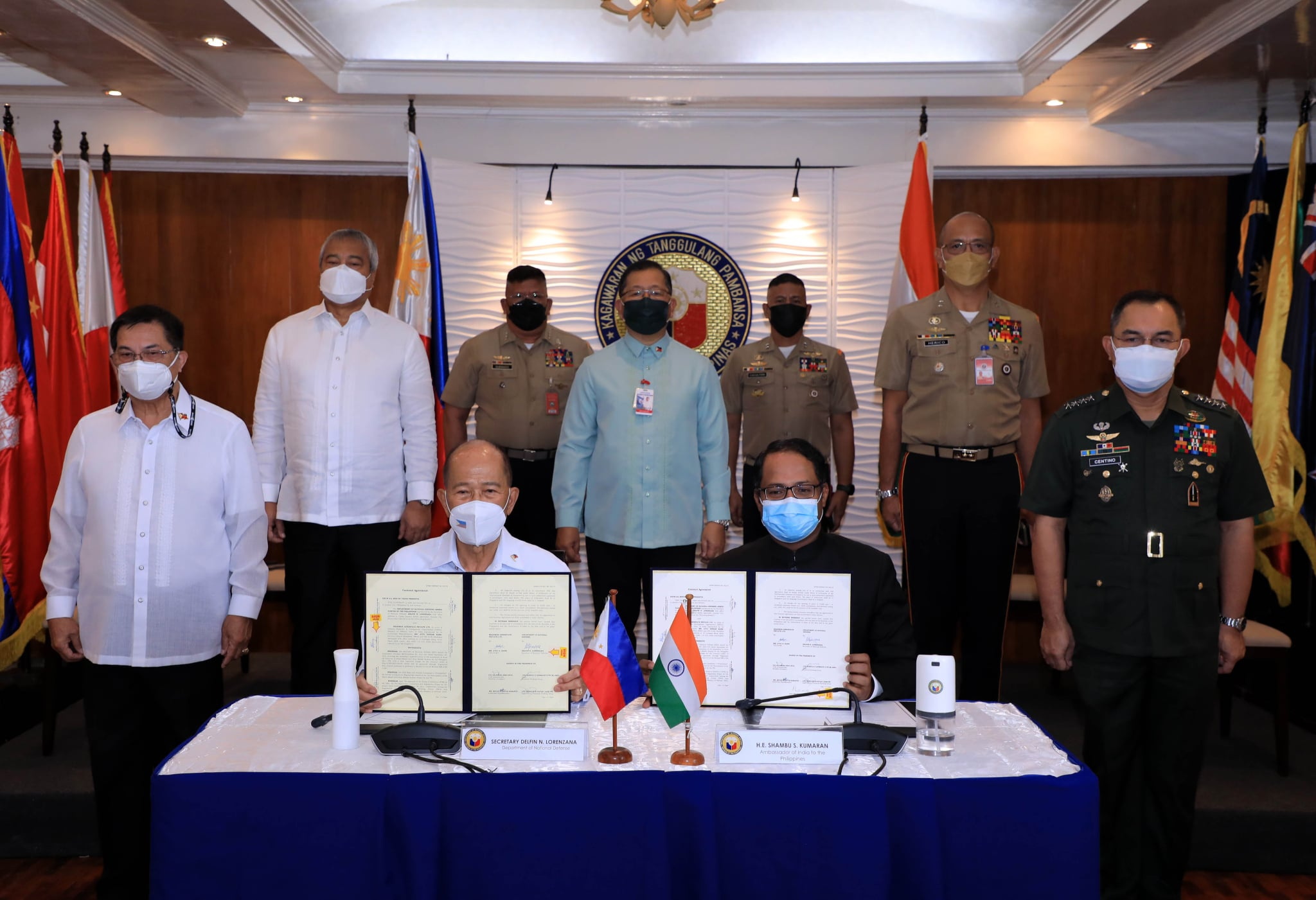
BrahMos deal between India and the Philippines signed on 28 January 2022 for the Philippine Marines' Coastal Defense Regiment's SBASM Battalion

In 2017, the Shore-based Anti-ship Missile System Acquisition Project for the maritime force was first conceptualized, while in 2020 the Office of the President approved its inclusion in the Horizon 2 Priority Projects.

In March 2021, the Department of National Defense (DND) signed an arms agreement with India to potentially acquire Indian weapons, including the BrahMos missile.

On 27 December 2021, two (SARO) — worth Php 1.3 billion (₹190 crore) and Php 1.535 billion (₹224 crore) — were issued by the Department of Budget Management (DBM) for the Shore-Based Anti-Ship Missile System Acquisition Project of the Philippine Navy. The SARO allows the DND to finalise contracts for military projects.

On 31 December 2021, BrahMos Aerospace Pvt Ltd's representatives received the Notice of Award (NOA) for the project worth US$374,962,800. A contract was signed on 28 January 2022. It includes at least 3 batteries as part of the agreement. A battery will have at least 3 mobile firing units, plus attached command and control, radar, and support vehicles and units. Each mobile firing unit has 3 ready-to-fire BrahMos anti-ship supersonic missiles, with the export variant having a maximum range of around 290 km (180 mi).

The batteries would be operated by the Shore-Based Anti-Ship Missile (SBASM) Battalion of the Philippine Marine Corps' Coastal Defense Regiment.

Philippines Marine Corps personnel has also completed their mandatory operator training under the supervision of BrahMos Aerospace and the Indian Navy in 2023. Indian Navy Chief Admiral R Hari Kumar felicitated Philippines Marine Corps personnel in a valedictory ceremony in India. Addressing the ceremony, Admiral Hari Kumar said that the induction of the BrahMos missile into the Philippine Marine Corps will strengthen the country's maritime capability and will contribute to the collective maritime security within the region.

On 19 April 2024, Indian Prime Minister Narendra Modi announced the first units of the BrahMos Missile Systems were delivered to the Philippine Marine Corps via Indian Air Force's C-17 and Il-76 transport aircraft. The deliveries to the Philippines was held up for a few months as the two nations hadn't signed a non-disclosure agreement, various sources stated. The delivery of the first battery was conducted with support from civilian aircraft agencies after a non-stop six-hour journey.

On 20 April 2025, India delivered the second battery of BrahMos cruise missiles to Philippines via sea. As of September 2025, the first battery has already been inducted by the Marine Corps while the third and the final battery is now ready for delivery. However, the delivery date has not been announced.

The first battery of the Philippines Marine Corps will be based at the Naval Station Leovigildo Gantioqui located southwards of Philippine Merchant Marine Academy, Zambales. The construction had begun by August 2022. The battery is composed of two twin missile launcher vehicles supported by a maintenance vehicle, a command post vehicle and a four-missile transporter-reloader vehicle. The version is reportedly an export variant of BrahMos Block I.The delivery of the third battery is underway as of August 2026. India and the Philippines were also in talks for the sale of another five systems and 60 missile units.

=== Future users ===
==== Vietnam ====
Vietnam was included in the "definite list of countries" which have expressed interest in BrahMos as per a report in 2021.However, Chinese concerns were believed to have been a direct cause behind the unsuccessful early negotiations for the sale of BrahMos to Vietnam even though Vietnam had previously acquired and commissioned the Russian Bastion-P coastal defence system which uses the largely-equivalent Yakhont anti-ship missile.

On 22 December 2024, it was reported that a deal worth $700 million for the sale of BrahMos to Vietnam was to be signed within few months. The initial techno-commercial intricacies had been discussed, while the draft agreement (which includes the final deal amount, delivery timeline, payment terms, and other details from the manufacturer) is awaited. The orders are expected from both Vietnamese Army and Vietnamese Navy. During a delegation-level meeting between the Indian defence minister, Rajnath Singh, and his Russian counterpart, Andrey Belousov, on 4 December, the latter had approved of the no objection on the weapon's export to Vietnam and Indonesia.The receival of the formal No Objection Certificate, however, is due. Further negotiations may be conducted on the deal worth ₹5,800 crore (US$600 million) for a regiment of Coastal missile battery between India and Vietnam during the Vietnamese president To Lam's visit to New Delhi in May 2025.

On 31 May 2026, the Defence Secretary, Rajesh Kumar Singh, confirmed during the Shangri-La Dialogue that an order has indeed been signed during the visit, though the exact public details were not publicly announced. India also expressed interest to supply the missiles to other ASEAN nations.

==== Indonesia ====
Indonesia has been in discussion with India for the purchase of BrahMos missile since July 2020 during the meet of the then Indonesian Defence Minister Prabowo Subianto with his Indian counterpart Rajnath Singh in India. As reported in January 2025, a deal worth $450 million for 290 km range BrahMos missiles is to be signed soon making Indonesia the third export customer after Philippines and Vietnam.

Multiple reports suggested that the deal would be finalised on 25–26 January 2025 when the Indonesian President, Prabowo Subianto, visits India as the Republic Day chief guest since India, Russia and Indonesia has trilaterally agreed upon the price of the deal. The final deal could take some time as formal procedures are due. The purchase will be on loan from one of the national banks of India (like the State Bank of India) unlike the previously expected EXIM Bank.

On 26 January, it was reported that an Indonesian delegation led by Navy chief Muhammad Ali visited the BrahMos Aerospace headquarters in order to finalise the proposed deal.

As reported on 4 November by ANI, all procedures and negotiations for Indonesia's BrahMos deal had been completed and only a final nod from the Russian authorities was pending for the contract signing. During a delegation-level meeting between the Indian defence minister, Rajnath Singh, and his Russian counterpart, Andrey Belousov, on 4 December, the latter had approved of the no objection on the weapon's export to Vietnam and Indonesia. The combined value of both the deal is $450 million and further order might be placed following the initial deal. The receival of the formal No Objection Certificate, however, is due.

On 9 March 2026, Indonesian defence ministry spokesperson, Rico Ricardo Sirait, told Reuters that the country has entered an agreement of unknown amount with India to purchase the BrahMos missile system. The deal was expected to cost $200–$350 million. One battery for coastal defence will be procured in the first phase. The procurement will be expanded to three additional batteries in future phases. The contract was expected to be signed within 2 to 3 months, i.e., early in the following fiscal year. The nation plans has also sought an additional battery. The contract was signed on 7 July when India's Prime Minister, Narendra Modi, was on a visit to Indonesia. Indonesia plans to operate a total of three BrahMos batteries. The country will also purchase Astra missiles. The worth of the BrahMos deal is estimated between $200–$350 million.

=== Potential users ===
==== Russia ====
In September 2016, it was revealed that the Russian Defense Ministry is interested in purchasing the air-launched BrahMos to arm their Su-30SM fighters. So far, Russia has not purchased the missile system for the Russian Air Force.

The BrahMos could be fitted to only few, if any, of the new ships of the Russian Navy. The updated Admiral Gorshkov-class frigates which are the latest type of frigate being built could possibly accommodate the missile. No BrahMos missile has been bought and inducted by the navy.

==== Philippines ====
In October 2019, the Philippine Army was reported to be in discussion with India for a possible BrahMos missile sale for at least 2 batteries to be acquired under the Land Based Missile System Acquisition (LBMS) Project. These systems are planned to be operated by the 1st Land Based Missile System Battery of the Army Artillery Regiment, which was activated in October 2019.

On 21 January 2022, the Philippine Army announced plans to purchase two of BrahMos medium-range missile systems within the 3rd horizon of the Revised Armed Forces of the Philippines Modernization Program (R-AFPMP) scheduled at the start of 2023 to the end of 2027. Further orders from Philippines are expected to materialise as of 23 December 2025.

In August 2026, reports indicated that the Philippine Army was considering the procurement of up to nine BrahMos batteries under their Integrated Shore-Based Anti-Ship Missile System initiative.

==== Brazil ====
Brazil has shown interest in the missile system. The discussions for signing a deal with BrahMos Aerospace to procure the missiles are on. The Commander of the Brazilian Army, General Tomas Ribeiro Paiva, already visited India to have a look at a military exercise being conducted at the Pokhran field firing ranges in August 2023. A new Brazilian delegation is poised to visit India in August 2024 to discuss the sea version of the missile, to possible fit the future Tamandaré-class frigates and the Shore-Based Anti-Ship Missile System variant.

==== Others ====
In January 2021, BrahMos Aerospace has said that several Southeast Asian and Latin American countries have expressed interest in the system, with particular interest in naval and coastal defense versions, and that a "definite list of countries" exists. These countries included Brunei, Chile, Egypt, Malaysia, Oman, South Africa and Venezuela. In the case of Malaysia, they are considering the purchase of the missile for use on its Kedah class warships and Sukhoi Su-30MKM.

One of the major issues regarding sales of the missile is that the nations looking to buy may have stressful relations with allies and trading partners of Russia. China is one of the main nations that has objections about its neighbours getting these missiles for their navies. It views the selling of these missiles as an act of belligerence and interference in the disputed territories like the South China Sea.

As per a June 2026 report by the Reuters, BrahMos is one of the weapon systems that are on offer to the United Arab Emirates (UAE) from India along with the Akashteer system. The discussions are at early stages but are "progressing rapidly". Further, Saudi Arabia and Thailand besides Egypt, Brazil and Chile are also reportedly interested in procuring the system.

== Operators ==
=== Current operators ===
India

- Indian Army: Four BrahMos regiments are known to be in service:
  - 861 Missile Regiment (BrahMos Block-I)
  - 1889 Missile Regiment
  - 334 Missile Regiment (BrahMos Block-II)
  - 881 Missile Regiment
- Indian Air Force
  - Indian Air Force BrahMos units: Surface-to-surface missiles
  - Thanjavur AFS (47 Wing)
    - No. 222 Squadron (Tigersharks)
- Indian Navy: The following ship classes of the navy are equipped with BrahMos:
  - Visakhapatnam-class destroyer
  - Kolkata-class destroyer
  - Delhi-class destroyer – INS Delhi (D61) and INS Mumbai (D62)
  - Rajput-class destroyer – INS Ranvir (D54) and INS Ranvijay (D55)
  - Nilgiri-class frigate
  - Shivalik-class frigate
  - Talwar-class frigate – Batch 2 onwards
  - Veer-class corvette - INS Vidyut

Philippines – Three BrahMos batteries ordered. Two batteries delivered as of April 2025. Missile base reportedly under construction at Naval Station San Miguel.

- Philippine Marine Corps: Operates the BrahMos Shore-Based Anti-Ship Missile system (Land-launched, anti-ship variant)
  - Coastal Defense Regiment
    - Shore-Based Anti-Ship Missile (SBASM) Battalion
      - 1st BrahMos Battery – Naval Station Leovigildo Gantioqui, Zambales

=== Future operators ===
Indonesia

- Indonesian Navy: A contract to acquire one coastal defence battery signed on 7 July 2026. The agreement was finalised by March 2026. One BrahMos battery ordered initially, with option of up to three batteries possible.

Vietnam

- Vietnam People's Navy: Agreement signed in FY2025-26.

=== Potential operators ===
Armenia

- Armenian Air Force

Brazil

- Brazilian Army
- Brazilian Navy

India

- Integrated Rocket Force (Planned)

Malaysia

- Royal Malaysian Air Force – air-launched variant acquisition for Sukhoi Su-30MKM.

Philippines

- Philippine Army – A purchase of between 2 and 9 BrahMos batteries is anticipated under the Revised Armed Forces of the Philippines Modernization Program (R-AFPMP).

Thailand

- Royal Thai Army – under evaluation as of September 2026.

Russia

- Russian Air Force
- Russian Navy

United Arab Emirates

== Accidents and incidents ==
- 20 January 2009 – On a test launch, an early developmental variant of the BrahMos missile missed its target at the Pokhran Test Range by 7 km, due to the switching off of GPS satellites and erroneous data from the INS series of satellites. A repeat mission on 4 March 2009 was a success.
- 12 July 2021 – In a test fire off the coast of Odisha, an extended-range variant of the missile fell to the ground shortly after launch, reportedly due to an error in the propulsion system.
- 9 March 2022 – An accidentally fired missile crashed into Pakistan. Pakistan said that the missile took off on the evening of 9 March and it was picked up by its air defence systems. From its initial course, the missile suddenly maneuvered towards Pakistani territory and crashed near Mian Channu city of Punjab province, causing no civilian casualties. Pakistan said its air force had "initiated requisite tactical actions" in response as it tracked the missile from its point of origin in India to its point of impact. Pakistan strongly condemned the incident and also cautioned India against recurrence of any such incident in the future. India said the incident was due to a "technical malfunction" and that it was "deeply regrettable". India also said that they have ordered a high-level court of inquiry to look into the incident. While still unconfirmed by both the Indian and Pakistani authorities, sources say that the missile fired was a BrahMos. According to Times of India, conventional missiles like the BrahMos also don't have self-destruct mechanisms like the ones available on India's strategic or nuclear missiles. ThePrint, quoting unnamed sources, claimed that Pakistan's air defence systems were not able to track the missile down and the missile did not veer off from its trajectory and followed the trajectory that it would have in case of a conflict.

== See also ==
- CX-1 Missile Systems – (China)
- Future Cruise/Anti-Ship Weapon – (France, Italy, United Kingdom)
- YJ-12 – (China)
- Boeing X-51 Waverider – (United States)
- RATTLRS – (United States)
- ASM-3 – (Japan)
- Yun Feng – (Taiwan)
