= Rajput-class destroyer =

Indian navy guided missile destroyers

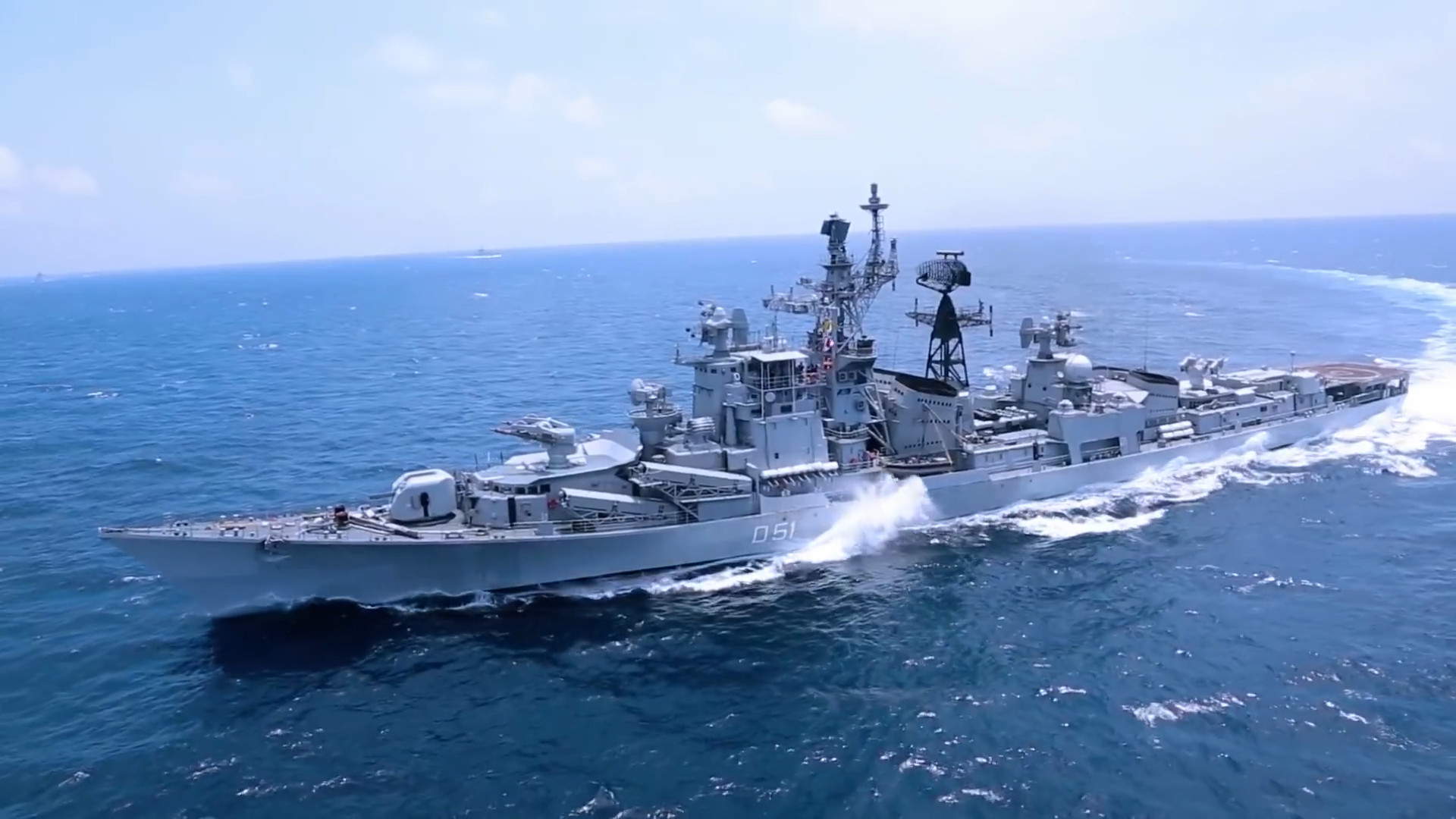
- INS Rajput (D51) during an exercise sporting Revathi radar.

Class overview
- Name: Rajput
- Builders: 61 Kommunara Shipbuilding Plant
- Operators: Indian Navy
- Succeeded by: Delhi class
- Planned: 5
- Completed: 5
- Active: 3
- Retired: 2

General characteristics
- Type: Guided missile destroyer
- Displacement: 3,950 tons standard; 4,974 tons full load
- Length: 146.5 m (481 ft)
- Beam: 15.8 m (52 ft)
- Draught: 4.8 m (16 ft)
- Propulsion: 4 × Zorya-Mashproekt M3E gas turbines in COGAG, 72,000 hp (54,000 kW); 2 shafts
- Speed: 35 knots (65 km/h)
- Range: 4,500 nmi (8,300 km) at 18 knots (33 km/h); 2,600 nautical miles (4,800 km) at 30 knots (56 km/h)
- Complement: 320 (including 35 officers)
- Sensors & processing systems: Navigation: 2 × Volga (NATO: Don Kay) radar at I-band frequency, Air: 1 × MP-500 Kliver radar at C-band or 1 × Bharat RAWL (Dutch Signaal LW08) radar at D-band (installed on INS Ranjit), Air/Surface: 1 × MR-310U Angara radar at E-band, replaced by 1 × EL/M-2238 STAR; Communication: Inmarsat, Sonar: 1 × hull mounted Vycheda MG-311 sonar replaced with Bharat HUMSA during MLR, 1 × Vyega MG-325 variable depth sonar
- Armament: See Armaments
- Aircraft carried: 1 × Ka-28 in last two ships and HAL Chetak helicopter in first three ships

The Rajput-class guided-missile destroyers built for the Indian Navy are modified versions of Soviet Kashin-class destroyers.

== Design ==
The Rajput-class are also known as the Kashin-II class or the Project 61ME. The ships were built in the former Soviet Union with considerable Indian design modifications to the Kashin design. While Kashin destroyers had their surface-to-surface missile launchers on their aft, the Rajput destroyers have them positioned in the forward direction. Further, the helicopter deck was enlarged and a helicopter elevator replaced the aft 76 mm gun mount of the Kashin destroyers. Other major changes to the electronics and combat systems resulted in the Rajput destroyers having a displacing 460 tons more than the former class. Five units were built for export to India in the 1980s. The Rajput class inherited their anti-aircraft and anti-submarine warfare roles for aircraft carrier task-force defense against submarines, low-flying aircraft, and cruise missiles from the Kashin class.

=== Destroyer as trial platforms ===
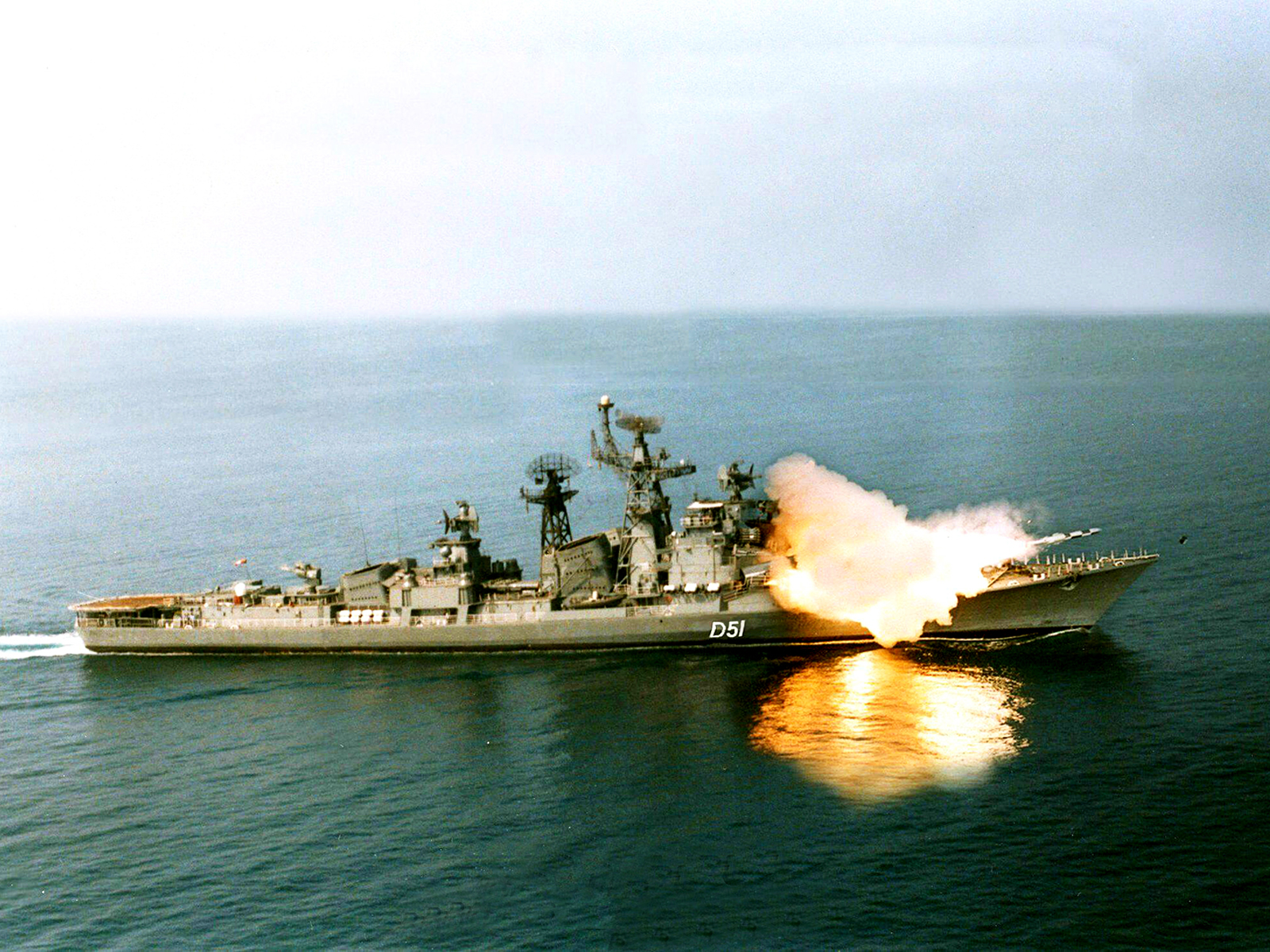
INS Rajput during a BrahMos missile trial in 2012

They were the first ships in the Indian Navy to deploy the BrahMos supersonic cruise missile systems. The systems were deployed during a mid-life refit of the ships. While two twin-tube BrahMos launchers replaced two single SS-N-2D Styx AShM launchers on port and starboard sides each in INS Rajput, while an eight-cell BrahMos vertical launching system replaced the aft S-125M (NATO: SA-N-1) SAM launcher in INS Ranvir and INS Ranvijay.

In 2008, the Indian Navy was planning to upgrade the propulsion of the Rajput-class ships with the indigenous Kaveri Marine Gas Turbine engine developed by the Gas Turbine Research Establishment of DRDO. The engine had entered the testing phase.

== Service history ==
All units are currently attached to the Eastern Naval Command.

During the TROPEX-21 exercise of the Indian Navy, the decommissioned Ranjit was sunk by a torpedo.

Rajput was decommissioned from the service on 21 May 2021.

== Armaments ==
Rajput (D51)	Ranjit (D53)	Rana (D52)	Ranvir (D54)	Ranvijay (D55)
Surface-to-surface/Anti-ship missiles
8 × BrahMos (bow inclined launchers; replaced 4 × SS-N-2D Styx launchers)	4 × SS-N-2D Styx AShM (bow inclined launchers)	4 × SS-N-2D Styx AShM (bow inclined launchers) (Removed by 2025)	8 × BrahMos aft VLS (replaced aft S-125 launcher); 4 × SS-N-2D Styx AShM (bow inclined launchers)	
Surface-to-air missiles
2 × S-125M twin arm launcher (forward and aft)		2 × 8 VL-SRSAM (replaced aft S-125 launcher)	2 × 8 Barak VLS (port and starboard; replacing 2 AK-630)	
2 × S-125M twin arm launcher (forward and aft)		1 × S-125M twin arm launcher (forward) (Removed by 2025)		
Naval gun/CIWS
1 × AK-726 twin 3" naval gun		1 × OTO Melara 76 mm naval gun (replaced AK-726 twin 3" naval gun)		
4 × 30 mm (1.2 in) AK-630M CIWS			2 × 30 mm (1.2 in) AK-630M CIWS	
Anti-submarine weapons
1 × 533 mm (21 in) PTA 533 quintuple torpedo tube launcher; 2 × RBU-6000 anti-submarine rocket launcher

== Ships of the class ==
Name	Pennant	Builder	Laid down	Launched	Commissioned	Decommissioned	Status
Rajput (ex-Nadezhniy)	D51	61 Kommunara	11 September 1976	17 September 1977	4 May 1980	21 May 2021	Decommissioned
Rana (ex-Gubitelyniyy)	D52	61 Kommunara	29 November 1976	27 September 1978	19 February 1982		Active
Ranjit (ex-Lovkiyy)	D53	61 Kommunara	29 June 1977	16 June 1979	24 November 1983	6 May 2019	Sunk during TROPEX-21 as a live target.
Ranvir (ex-Tverdyy)	D54	61 Kommunara	24 October 1981	12 March 1983	21 April 1986		Active
Ranvijay (ex-Tolkoviyy)	D55	61 Kommunara	19 March 1982	1 February 1986	21 December 1987		Active

== See also ==
- List of destroyer classes in service

Equivalent destroyers of the same era

- Hatakaze class
- Udaloy class
- Kidd class
- Type 051D
- Almirante Brown class
