= RATTLRS =

The Lockheed Martin BGM-178 RATTLRS (Revolutionary Approach To Time-critical Long Range Strike) was an advanced cruise missile concept demonstration funded by the US Navy with the view to develop technologies that would then be used to develop a successor to the BGM-109 Tomahawk. The five year contract was awarded on 1 March 2004. It is a possible solution to hypersonic cruise missile systems for the United States.

Lockheed’s Skunk Works was the prime contractor, while Rolls-Royce Liberty Works was designing the YJ102R high-Mach turbine engine. The missile's airframe bears resemblance to the BrahMos missile, and is similar in size and shape to the engine nacelle of the SR-71, or to the D-21 drone. The missile's airframe design would enable it to cruise at very high speeds to strike a target over 1,000 kilometers in less than 30 minutes. The missile would be ideal for engaging on-the-move or about to move targets, and could possibly be a suitable anti-ship missile, utilizing its tremendous speed to evade enemy CIWS defenses.

In comparison to the Russian-Indian BrahMos, the RATTLRS is slightly slower, but has double, if not triple the range, and has a larger variety of launch platforms, since it has the capability to launch from the Mk. 41 VLS system, as well as a multitude of American aircraft.

== Specifications ==
Name: RATTLRS (Revolutionary Approach to Time Critical Long Range Strike)
Type: Long-range hypersonic cruise missile test vehicle
Developed: Lockheed Martin, Raytheon
Length: 21 ft

Diameter: 520 mm
Engine: Rolls-Royce YJ102R turbojet
Warhead: 500 lbs penetrating HE or submunition dispensing warhead
Cruise speed: Mach 3+
Range: 500+ nm (1,000+ km)
Platforms: air-launched or even surface launched
