= INS Rajput (D51) =

Rajput-class guided missile destroyer

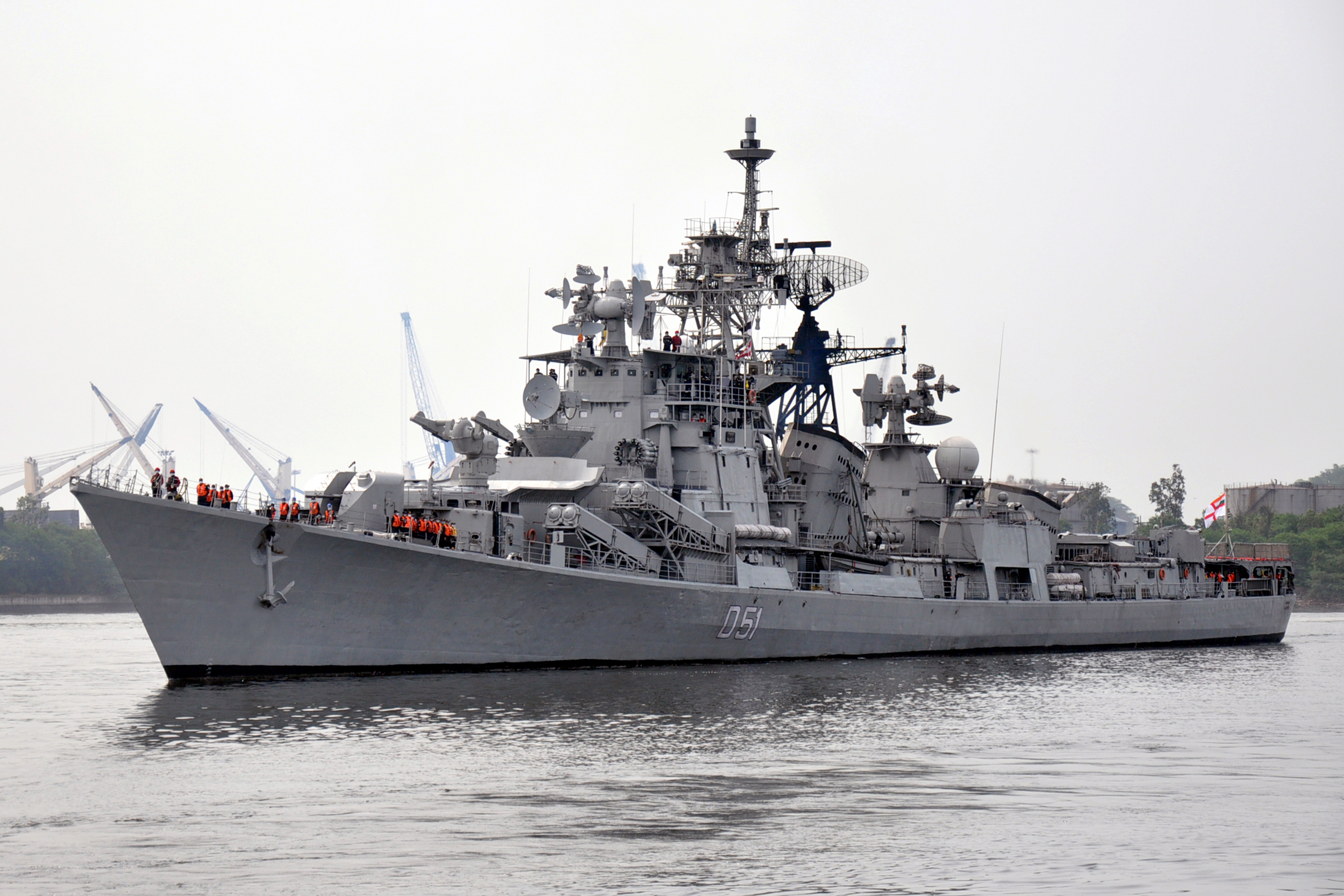
- INS Rajput

History

India
- Name: Rajput
- Namesake: Rajput
- Builder: 61 Kommunara Shipbuilding Plant
- Laid down: 11 September 1976
- Launched: 17 September 1977
- Commissioned: 4 May 1980
- Decommissioned: 21 May 2021
- Identification: Pennant number: D51
- Motto: Raaj Karega Rajput (lit. The Rajput Will Rule)
- Status: Decommissioned
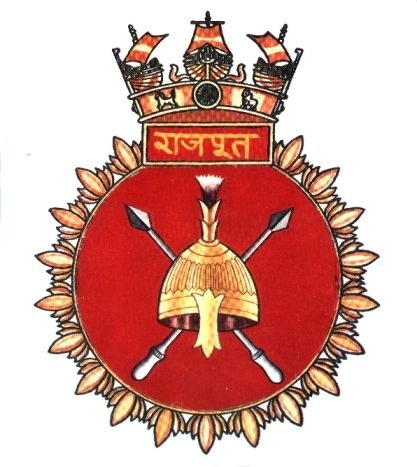
- Badge

General characteristics
- Class & type: Rajput-class destroyer
- Displacement: 3,950 tons standard, 4,974 tons full load
- Length: 147 m (482 ft 3 in)
- Beam: 15.8 m (51 ft 10 in)
- Draught: 5 m (16 ft 5 in)
- Propulsion: 4 x gas turbine engines; 2 shafts, 72,000 hp (54,000 kW)
- Speed: 35 knots (65 km/h; 40 mph)
- Range: 4,000 mi (6,400 km) at 18 knots (33 km/h; 21 mph); 2,600 miles (4,200 km) at 30 knots (56 km/h; 35 mph)
- Complement: 320 (including 35 officers)
- Sensors & processing systems: Navigation: 2 × Volga (NATO: Don Kay) radar at I band frequency, Air: 1 × MP-500 Kliver (NATO: Big Net-A) radar at C band, Air/Surface: 1 × EL/M-2238 STAR (replacing 1 × MR-310U Angara (NATO: Head Net-C) radar at E band); Communication: Inmarsat, Sonar: BEL HUMSA (replacing 1 × hull mounted Vycheda MG-311 (NATO: Wolf Paw) sonar during mid-life refit), 1 × Vyega MG-325 (NATO: Mare Tail) variable depth sonar
- Armament: Anti-surface/ship: 8 × BrahMos supersonic missiles (replacing 4 × SS-N-2D Styx AShM in 2003); Air-defence: 2 × S-125M (NATO: SA-N-1) SAM launchers; Guns: 1 × AK-726 twin 3" naval gun, 4 × 30 mm (1.2 in) AK-230 CIWS; Anti-submarine: 1 × 533 mm (21 in) PTA 533 quintuple torpedo tube launcher, 2 × RBU-6000 anti-submarine mortars,
- Aircraft carried: 2 × HAL Chetak helicopter (or) 1 × Kamov Ka-27 helicopter

INS Rajput was a guided-missile destroyer and the lead ship of the Rajput class of the Indian Navy. It was commissioned on 4 May 1980. It was the first destroyer of the Indian Navy. It was built for India by the erstwhile USSR, and had the shipyard name Nadezhny (lit. Reliable). Captain (later Vice Admiral) Gulab Mohanlal Hiranandani was her first commanding officer.

== Construction and career ==
The keel of the ship was laid down on 11 September 1976, and it was constructed at the 61 Kommunar yard in Nikolaev, Ukrainian SSR (now Ukraine). The original name given to the ship was Nadezhdy (lit. hope in Russian). It was launched into open waters on 17 September 1977. It was commissioned as the INS Rajput at Poti, Georgian SSR (now Georgia) on 4 May 1980 by Inder Kumar Gujral, then the Ambassador of India to the USSR (later the Prime Minister).

The ship was decommissioned on 21 May 2021 at the Naval Dockyard in Visakhapatnam. She has participated in several important missions over the years, including Operation Aman off the coast of Sri Lanka to assist the Indian Peace Keeping Force during the Sri Lankan Civil War, Operation Pawan for patrolling duties off the coast of Sri Lanka, Operation Cactus to resolve the hostage situation off the Maldives, and Operation Crowsnest off Lakshadweep.

== Rajput as trial platform ==
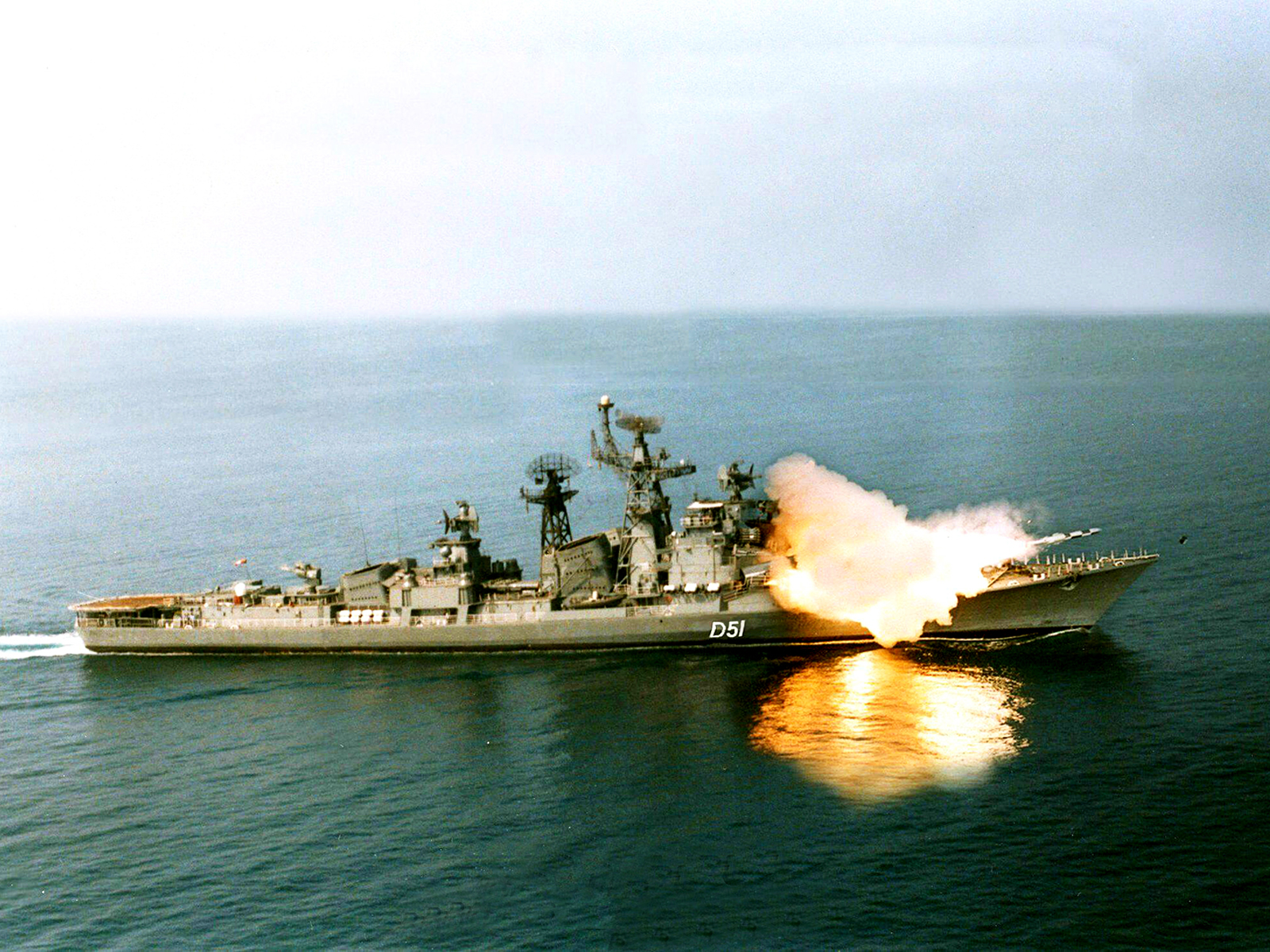
INS Rajput during a BrahMos missile trial in 2012

The Rajput served as the trial platform for the BrahMos cruise missile, and was the first warship to be equipped with the missile. The 4 P-20M inclined single launchers on the ship (2 port and 2 starboard) were replaced by 8 boxed launchers (4 port and 4 starboard) with each having the ability to carry one BrahMos cruise missile. The BrahMos missile was test fired from the ship twice in 2003 and once in 2004, 2005 and 2008 (land-attack variant).

A new variant of the Prithvi-III missile, named Dhanush, was test fired from the Rajput in March 2007 and successfully hit a land-based target. The missile had an enhanced range of 350 km. She is capable of attacking land targets, as well as fulfilling anti-aircraft and anti-submarine roles as a taskforce or carrier escort. Rajput tracked the Dhanush ballistic missile during a successful test in 2005.
