= 881 Missile Regiment (India) =

- Country: India
- Allegiance: India
- Branch: Indian Army
- Type: Artillery
- Size: Regiment
- Motto(s): Sarvatra, Izzat-O-Iqbal (Everywhere with Honour and Glory)
- Colors: "Red & Navy Blue"
- Equipment: BrahMos

881 Missile Regiment is a BrahMos equipped regiment which is part of the Regiment of Artillery of the Indian Army.

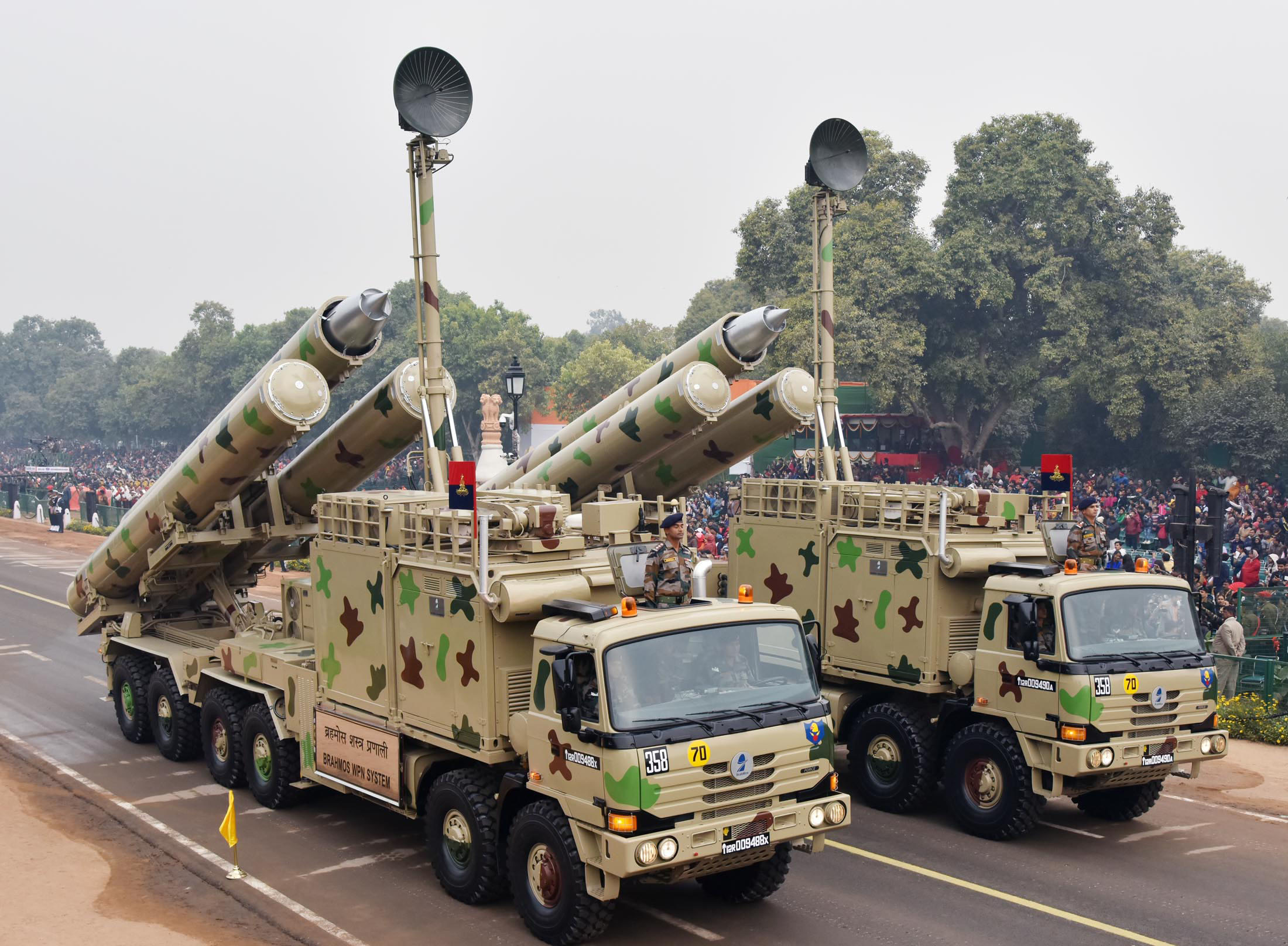
BrahMos missiles of the regiment during rehearsal of Republic Day Parade, January 2018

== History ==
The regiment was raised as light regiment. It was converted to a missile regiment in 2011. It is presently part of 41 Artillery Division.

=== Operations ===
- Indo-Pakistani War of 1971
- Operation Meghdoot

== Achievements ==
- The regiment was awarded the COAS unit citation in 1999.
- The Regiment had the honour of participating in the annual Republic Day parade in 2013, 2015 and 2018.

== See also ==
- List of artillery regiments of Indian Army
