= 861 Missile Regiment (India) =

Mortar equipped Indian Army regiment

861 Light Regiment
- Active: 1963 – present
- Country: India
- Allegiance: India
- Branch: Indian Army
- Type: Artillery
- Size: Regiment
- Motto(s): Sarvatra Izat O Iqbal (Everywhere with Honour and Glory)
- Colors: "Red & Navy Blue"
- Decorations: Sena Medal 1 COAS Commendation Card 4 VCOAS Commendation Card 7 GOC-in-C Commendation Card 9

861 Light Regiment (Laleali & Picquet 707) is a light equipped regiment which is part of the Regiment of Artillery of the Indian Army.

== History ==
=== Formation ===
861 Regiment (Laleali & Picquet 707) traces its origin from the Border Scouts Battalion. It was raised as the 863 Light Battery by amalgamating a nucleus of 121 (Independent) Heavy Mortar Battery (Congo) and a battery of 35 Heavy Mortar Regiment on 20 June 1963. Lieutenant Colonel Sewa Ram was the first Commanding Officer. 86 Light Regiment was eventually formed with three batteries – 121 Heavy Mortar Battery, 862 Light Battery and 863 Light Battery. This eventually evolved to become the 861 Light Regiment.

=== Operations ===
United Nations Operation in the Congo

121 Heavy Mortar Battery participated in the Indian Army United Nations peacekeeping mission in Congo under 99 Infantry Brigade.

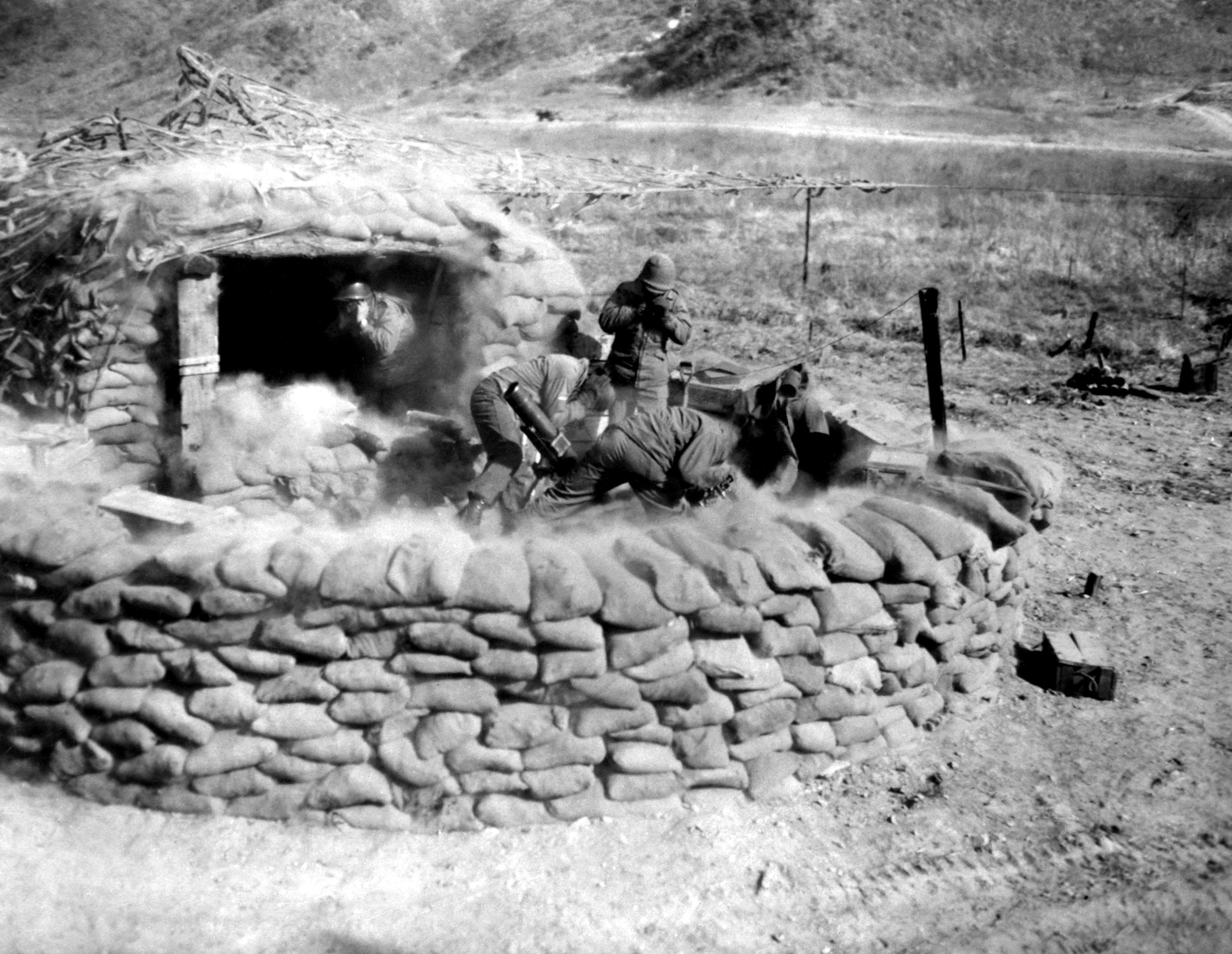

Indo-Pak War (1965)

86 Light Regiment participated in Operation Ablaze and Operation Riddle.

Indo-Pakistani War of 1971

The Regiment provided fire power to 28 Infantry Brigade of 10 Infantry Division in the Battle of Chamb. The devastating shelling by the Regiment on 3 and 4 December 1971 helped beat back the attack on Picquet 707. The shelling on 6 and 7 December 1971 similarly prevented the attack on Laleali. The Regiment along with 8 Jammu and Kashmir Militia (now Light Infantry) were awarded the battle honours Laleali and Picquet 707.

== See also ==
- List of artillery regiments of Indian Army
