= CX-1 Missile Systems =

CX-1
- Type: Anti-ship missile Cruise missile
- Place of origin: China

Production history
- Manufacturer: China Aerospace Science and Technology Corporation

Specifications
- Warhead: 260 kg (570 lb)
- Operational range: 280 km (170 mi; 150 nmi)
- Flight altitude: 17,000 m (56,000 ft) (cruising); 10 m (33 ft) (terminal)
- Maximum speed: Mach 3 (0.6 mi/s; 1.0 km/s)
- Guidance system: Inertial measurement unit (IMU) and active radar seeker
- Launch platform: transporter erector launcher (TEL); Warship

The Chaoxun-1 (CX-1) is a Chinese-built supersonic anti-ship missile and cruise missile. The missile was first displayed at the 10th China International Aviation and Aerospace Exhibition, held November 2014 in Zhuhai, China.

== Overview ==
The CX-1 is a supersonic anti-ship cruise missile (ASCM) that can travel up to Mach 2.8–3 at an altitude of 17,000 m (56,000 ft). It travels along a low-high-low flight profile and has a range of 40–280 km (25–174 mi; 22–151 nmi) using a two-stage booster, descending to 10 meters above the water when 10 km (6.2 mi; 5.4 nmi) from the target. The 260 kg (570 lb) warhead has a 20 m (66 ft) circular error probability (CEP).

There are two initial versions of the CX-1; the CX-1A ship-borne system and CX-1B road-mobile land-based system, equipped with a unitary semi-armor-piercing warhead. It also reportedly has a second land-attack function, for which it can have a unitary fragmentation-blast or penetration warhead. A land-based road-mobile unit would be composed of one command vehicle, one support vehicle, three launching vehicles, three transporter-loader vehicles, and 12 canisters for two-wave attacks. A submarine-launched version is also suspected.

The CX-1 is believed to be made purely for export, as its specifications meet requirements set by the Missile Technology Control Regime (MTCR), which restricts exporting missiles carrying payloads greater than 500 kilograms at ranges exceeding 300 kilometers. Several potential customers have been speculated, including Pakistan since it has been a major recipient of Chinese arms. Other countries include Iran, although they have been attempting to develop domestic missile capabilities to lessen reliance on foreign suppliers, and countries in South America and Africa, but specific countries have not been named and Russia has been an established supplier of similar systems in those areas.

=== Reverse-engineering claims ===
Shortly after its unveiling, the CX-1 was suspected to have been a Chinese-made copy of the Russian-Indian BrahMos, as it shares the BrahMos' distinctive cone-inlet air intake, two-stage structure, and similar dimensions. China is not a known user of P-800 Oniks, which BrahMos is based on. Analysts as well as Indian military sources have denied that the CX-1 is a copy of the BrahMos, and more likely derived from other Russian anti-ship missiles which have been sold to China over the years. While bearing a superficial resemblance, differences include the wings, guidance and jet vanes, a smaller front end, different air intake, and different engine. The CX-1 was more likely influenced by other Chinese-operated Russian missiles like the SS-N-22 Sunburn.

== See also ==
- BrahMos – (India, Russia)
- P-800 Oniks – (Russia)
- Future Cruise/Anti-Ship Weapon – (France, Italy, United Kingdom)
- YJ-18 – (China)
