= IACI =

IACI or Iaci may refer to:

== Groups, organizations ==
- IAC/InterActiveCorp (stock ticker IACI), former name of IAC (ticker: IAC), media holding company
- Iran Aircraft Industries (IACI)
- Irish American Cultural Institute (IACI)

== Other uses ==
- Atanasiu di Iaci (13th century), Benedictine monk
- Vikrant-class aircraft carrier (Indigenous Aircraft Carrier type 1; IAC-I), Republic of India
  - INS Vikrant (2013) (Indigenous Aircraft Carrier no. 1; IAC-I), Republic of India
- Industrial Accident Compensation Insurance (IACI), see Pension policy in South Korea
- Idiopathic arterial calcification of infancy (IACI), also called Generalized arterial calcification of infancy (GACI)

== See also ==
- IACIS
- IACL
- lACI
- IAC (disambiguation)
