= IAC =

IAC may refer to:

== Medicine ==
- IAC (chemotherapy), a chemotherapy regimen
- Internal auditory canal

== Organizations ==
- IAC (company), an American media company
- International Academy of Ceramics
- International Academy of Cytology, a scientific global NGO for cytopathologists and cytologists
- India Against Corruption
- Indigenous Advisory Council, an Australian government agency
- Industrial Assessment Center, an American training program and research program
- Instituto de Astrofísica de Canarias, an astrophysical research institute in the Canary Islands
- InterAcademy Council, global network of academies of science, engineering, and medicine
- Inter-African Committee on Traditional Practices Affecting the Health of Women and Children, a rights organization
- International Action Center, a leftist organization
- International Advisory Council, operates the International Teletraffic Congress
- International Aerobatic Club, an American sports governing body
- International Astronautical Congress
- Interstate Athletic Conference, an all-boys high school sports league in the Washington, D.C. area
- Interstate Aviation Committee, a civil aviation authority in the Commonwealth of Independent States
- Irish Air Corps, the aviation wing of the Irish Defense Forces
- Israeli-American Council, an American nonprofit umbrella organization
- Istituto per le Applicazioni del Calcolo Mauro Picone, an Italian applied mathematics research institute

== Sport ==
- Indoor Africa Cup, the Indoor hockey at Africa
- Indy Autonomous Challenge, a 2021 race for autonomous cars at the Indianapolis Motor Speedway

== Other uses ==
- I'm a Celebrity...Get Me Out of Here! (British TV series), in TV Shows
- Idle air controller, in an internal combustion engine
- Image of the absolute conic, in computer vision; see Camera resectioning
- Imperfect authentic cadence, in music
- Indigenous Aircraft Carrier, an Indian Navy designation for aircraft carriers built in India
- Idol Star Athletics Championships, a popular South Korean TV variety program (alternately abbreviated as "ISAC")
- Ineffective assistance of counsel, in US law
- Infrastructure as Code (IaC), a technique for managing computer hardware, as software.
- Interactive activation and competition networks, a kind of neural network
- Interapplication communication, in computing
- International access code, in telecommunications

== See also ==
- 1AC
- lAC (disambiguation)
- IACS (disambiguation)
