= Vikrant-class aircraft carrier =

Planned Indian aircraft carrier class

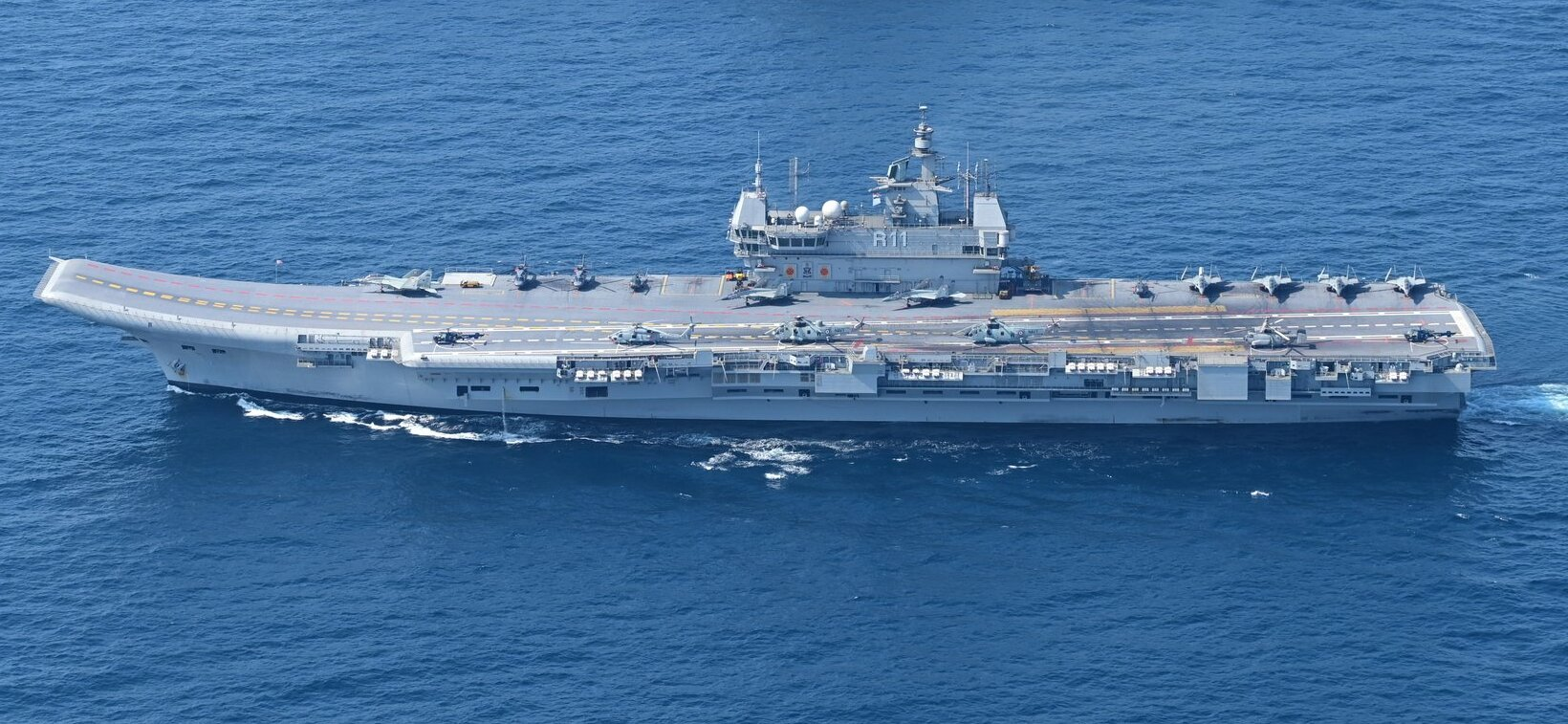
- INS Vikrant with air wing.

Class overview
- Name: Vikrant-class aircraft carrier
- Builders: Cochin Shipyard Limited
- Operators: Indian Navy Ensign Indian Navy
- Preceded by: INS Vikramaditya
- Succeeded by: INS Vishal
- In service: 2022–present
- Planned: 2
- Completed: 1
- Active: 1

General characteristics
- Type: Aircraft carrier
- Displacement: 45,000 t (44,000 long tons)
- Length: 262 metres (859 ft 7 in)
- Beam: 62 metres (203 ft 5 in)
- Draught: 8.4 metres (27 ft 7 in)
- Depth: 25.6 metres (84 ft 0 in)
- Propulsion: 4 × General Electric LM2500 Gas Turbine (88 MW); 2 × Elecon COGAG Gearbox; Two shafts
- Speed: 30 kn (56 km/h; 35 mph)
- Range: 8,000 nautical miles (15,000 km)
- Complement: 1,400 (including air crew)
- Sensors & processing systems: Elta EL/M-2248 MF-STAR AESA multifunction radar; Selex RAN-40L 3D L-Band Air Surveillance Radar
- Electronic warfare & decoys: DRDO Shakti EW suite; Kavach anti-missile system; Maareech Advanced Torpedo Defence System
- Armament: 2 × 16 VLS Barak 8 surface-to-air missiles; 3 × AK-630 CIWS; 5 x OFT 12.7 mm M2 Stabilized Remote Controlled Gun
- Aircraft carried: INS Vikrant: 36 aircraft: Fixed-wing: MiG-29K; HAL Tejas (trials); Rafale M (already ordered); HAL TEDBF (in development); Rotary-wing: Kamov Ka-31; MH-60R; HAL Dhruv
- Aviation facilities: Flight deck area: 12,500 m^{2} (135,000 sq ft)

The Vikrant class (lit. 'Courageous') (formerly Project 71 Air Defence Ship (ADS) or Indigenous Aircraft Carrier (IAC)) is a class of aircraft carrier being built for the Indian Navy. The class represents the largest warships and the first aircraft carriers to be designed and built in India.

Preparations for building the lead vessel of the class, INS Vikrant, started in 2008, and the keel was laid in February 2009. The carrier was floated out of its dry dock on 29 December 2011, launched on 12 August 2013 and commissioned on 2 September 2022. The scale and complexity of the project caused problems which delayed the construction for the carrier. Technical difficulties, the cost of refitting the Soviet-built carrier INS Vikramaditya, and billions in cost overruns delayed plans for the first of the vessels to enter service.

== Background ==
In 1989, India announced a plan to replace its ageing British-built aircraft carriers, Vikrant and Viraat, with two new 28,000 ton Air Defence Ships (ADS) that would operate the BAe Sea Harrier aircraft. The first vessel was to replace Vikrant, which was set to decommission in early 1997. Construction of the ADS was to start at the Cochin Shipyard (CSL) in 1993 after the Indian Naval Design Organisation had translated this design study into a production model. Following the 1991 economic crisis, the plans for construction of the vessels were put on hold indefinitely.

In 1999, then Defence Minister George Fernandes revived the project and sanctioned the construction of the Project 71 ADS. By that time, given the ageing Sea Harrier fleet, the letter of intent called for a carrier that would carry more modern jet fighters. In 2001, CSL released a graphic illustration showing the 32,000-ton STOBAR (Short Take-Off But Arrested Recovery) design with a pronounced ski jump. The aircraft carrier project finally received formal government approval in January 2003. By then, design updates called for a 37,500 ton carrier to operate the MiG-29K. India opted for a three-carrier fleet consisting of one carrier battle group stationed on each seaboard, and a third carrier held in reserve, in order to continuously protect both its flanks, to protect economic interests and mercantile traffic, and to provide humanitarian platforms in times of disasters, since a carrier can provide a self-generating supply of fresh water, medical assistance or engineering expertise to populations in need for assistance.

In August 2006, then Chief of the Naval Staff, Admiral Arun Prakash stated that the designation for the vessel had been changed from Air Defence Ship (ADS) to Indigenous Aircraft Carrier (IAC). The euphemistic ADS had been adopted in planning stages to ward off concerns about a naval build-up. Final revisions to the design increased the displacement of the carriers from 37,500 tons to over 40,000 tons. The length of the ship also increased from 252 metres (827 ft) to over 260 metres (850 ft).

== Design and description ==
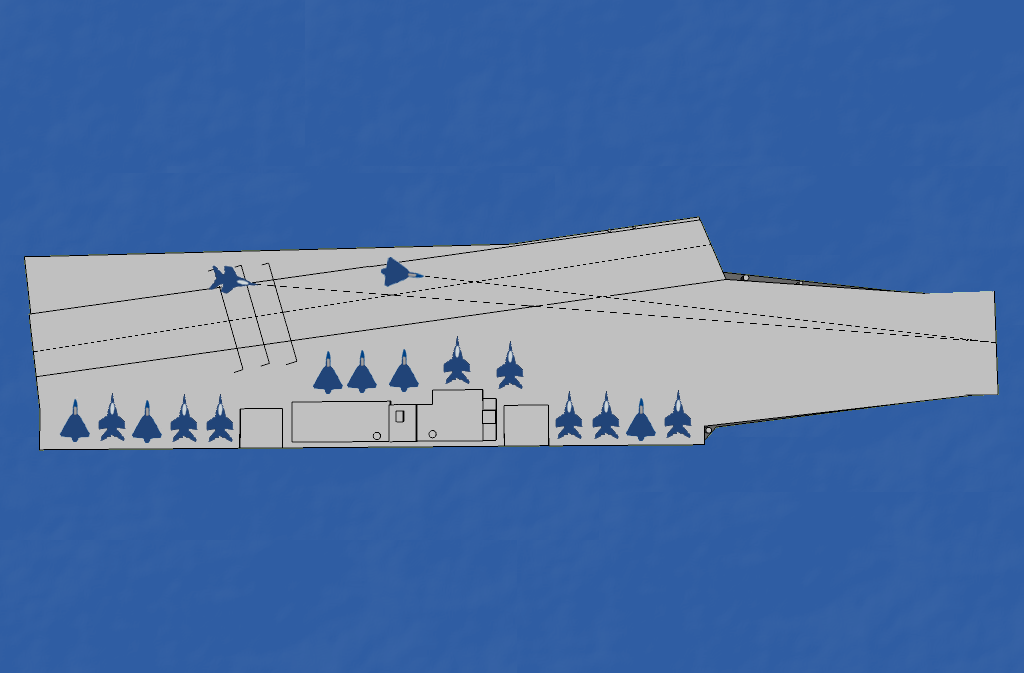
A schematic representation of Vikrant's flight deck.

INS Vikrant, displaces about 40,000 metric tons (39,000 long tons), is 262 metres (859 ft 7 in) long and has a tailored air group of up to thirty aircraft. The IAC-I features a STOBAR (Short Take-Off But Arrested Recovery) configuration with a ski-jump. The deck is designed to enable aircraft such as the MiG-29K to operate from the carrier. It will deploy up to 30 fixed-wing aircraft, primarily the Mikoyan MiG-29K, besides carrying 10 Kamov Ka-31 or Westland Sea King helicopters. The Ka-31 will fulfill the airborne early warning (AEW) role and the Sea King will provide anti-submarine warfare (ASW) capability.

== Carrier air group ==
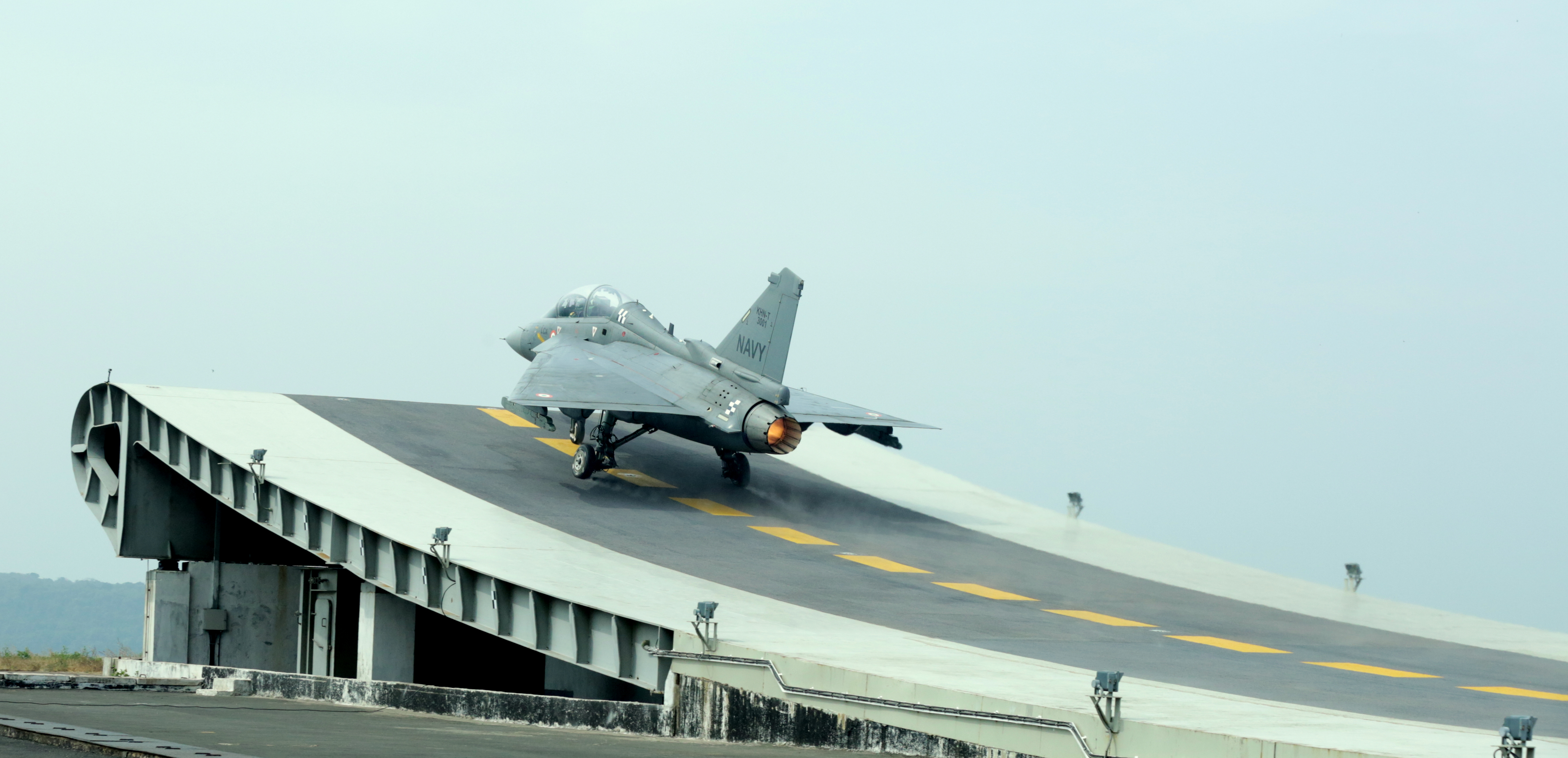
Naval variant of Tejas taking-off during test-flight from a shore-based ski-jump facility at INS Hansa, Goa

India considered a number of aircraft for operation from its INS Vikramaditya and the planned indigenous aircraft carrier. India evaluated the Russian Sukhoi Su-33, but chose the lighter Mikoyan MiG-29K as Vikramaditya was smaller and lacked an aircraft catapult. On 18 January 2010, it was reported that India and Russia were close to signing a deal for 29 MiG-29K fighters to operate from IAC-I. In addition, the navy signed a deal for six naval-variants of the HAL Tejas. In June 2012, Flight Global reported that the Indian Navy was considering the use of Rafale M (Naval variant) on these carriers. On 28 April 2025, India signed a defense agreement with France to procure 26 Rafale-M, valued at approximately ₹63,000 crore. This included 22 single-seat jets and 4 twin-seat jets.

In December 2016, the navy announced that the HAL Tejas is overweight for carrier operations, and other alternatives will be looked at.

== Construction ==
=== INS Vikrant ===
Amongst the first construction problems experienced was the lack of supply of carrier-grade steel due to the inability of Russia to supply the AB/A grade steel. Finally, the Defence Metallurgical Research Laboratory (DMRL) worked with the Steel Authority of India Limited (SAIL) to create suitable production facilities for the steel in India. The SAIL Steel Plants of the Steel at Bhilai, Rourkela, Durgapur and Bokaro manufactured 26,000 tonnes of three special steels being used for the hull, flight deck and floor compartments of the carrier.

The keel for Vikrant was laid by Defence Minister A.K. Antony at the Cochin Shipyard on 28 February 2009. The ship uses modular construction, with 874 blocks joined together for the hull. By the time the keel was laid, 423 blocks weighing over 8,000 tonnes had been completed. The construction plan called for the carrier to be launched in 2010, when it would displace some 20,000 tonnes, as a larger displacement could not be accommodated in the building bay. It was planned that after about a year’s development in the refit dock, the carrier would be launched when all the major components, including underwater systems, would be in place. Outfitting would then be carried out after launch. As per the Cabinet Committee on Security (CCS), sea trials were initially planned to commence in 2013, with the ship to be commissioned in 2014.

In March 2011, it was reported that the project had been affected by the delay in delivery of the huge main gearboxes for the carrier. The supplier, Elecon Engineering, had to work around a number of technical complexities due to the length of the propulsion shafts. Other issues resulting in delays included an accident with a diesel generator and an issue with its alignment. In August 2011, the defence ministry reported to the Lok Sabha that 75% of the construction work for the hull of the lead carrier had been completed and the carrier would be first launched in December 2011, following which further works would be completed until commissioning. On 29 December 2011, the completed hull of the carrier was first floated out of its dry dock at CSL, with its displacement at over 14,000 tonnes. Interior works and fittings on the hull would be carried out until the second half of 2012, when it would again be dry-docked for integration with its propulsion and power generation systems.

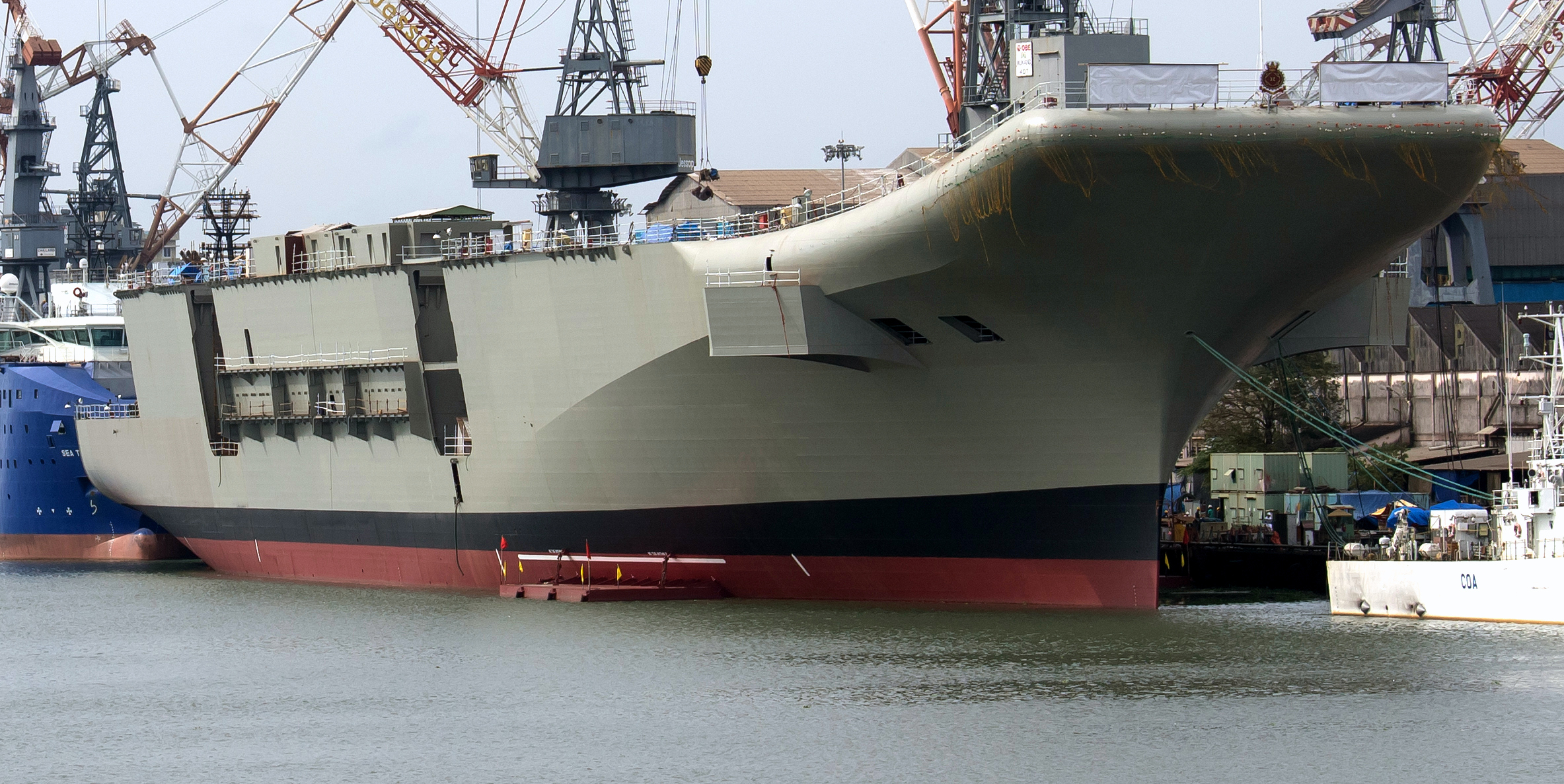
INS Vikrant during its launch in August 2013

In July 2012, The Times of India reported that construction of Vikrant has been delayed by 3 years, and the ship would be ready for commissioning by 2017. Then again in November 2012, NDTV reported that cost of the aircraft carrier had increased and the delivery has been delayed by at least five years and is expected to be with the Indian Navy only after 2018 as against the scheduled date of delivery of 2014. Work has begun for next stage which includes installation of the integrated propulsion system. Italian defence company Avio is installing the integrated platform management system (IPMS).

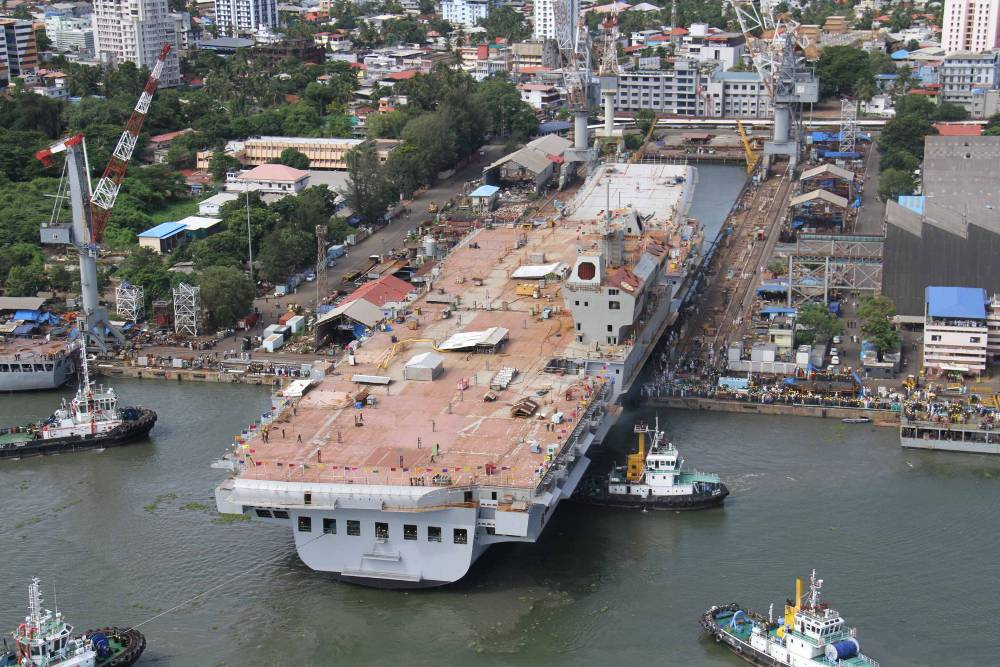
INS Vikrant during its undocking in June 2015

In July 2013, Defence Minister A K Antony announced that Vikrant would be launched on 12 August at the Cochin Shipyard. After its launch, Vikrant would be re-docked for completion of rest of the work including the flight deck. According to Vice Admiral Robin Dhowan, about 83% of the fabrication work and 75% of the construction work has been completed. He said that 90% of the body work of the aircraft carrier had been designed and made in India, about 50% of the propulsion system, and about 30% of the fighting capability of the carrier was Indian. He also said that the ship will be equipped with a long range missile system with multi-function radar and a close-in weapon system (CIWS). The ship was launched by Elizabeth Antony, wife of Defence Minister A K Antony on 12 August 2013.

In July 2016, the Comptroller & Auditor General (CAG) published a 2014 project plan, supplied by the Cochin Shipyard, that shows an expected completion date in 2023, though the Navy hopes to partially commission the ship before this date.

The carrier is powered by four General Electric LM2500 gas turbines on two shafts, generating over 80MW of power. The gearboxes for the carriers were designed and supplied by Elecon Engineering.

=== Repeat order (IAC-II) ===
In December 2022, it was first reported that the Indian Navy is planning for a repeat order of INS Vikrant before immediately going for INS Vishal due to budgetary constraints and the satisfactory performance of newly commissioned Vikrant.

By November 2023, a ₹400 billion worth proposal for the new carrier, with an improved design, was on track to be approved by the Defense Acquisition Council — the country's top defense decision-making body chaired by Defence Minister, Rajnath Singh. It was expected that INS Vikramaditya will reach its end of operational lifetime when IAC-II could be commissioned allowing the Navy to maintain a fleet of two aircraft carriers.

The new carrier, which can hold at least 28 fighter jets and helicopters, will displace 45,000 tons. The ship, provisionally called IAC-II, would initially employ the French Rafale, which will be replaced by HAL TEDBF fighters in the 2030s.

As of March 2024, Indian Navy has been submitted the proposal to acquire another aircraft carrier to Ministry of Defence. It will have an increased indigenous content than INS Vikrant (IAC-1). The major components which will be indigenised includes arresting gear system (so far acquired from Proletarsky Zavod), restraining gear used to launch aircraft and precision approach radar. Such radars for the aircraft carriers will face an import ban from 2031 under Positive Indigenisation List of the defence ministry. Three units of each of these equipment will be ordered to replace their foreign counterparts in the existing carriers. Their development will be completed by 2028.

On 3 February 2025, IAC-II was being seen as a replacement for Vikramaditya. The latter has a remainder of 10–12 years of operational life which is also the timeline required to commission an aircraft carrier from project sanction to commissioning. This implied the intent of the Navy to maintain a fleet centred on two aircraft carriers.

== Ships of the class ==
Name	Pennant	Tonnage	Laid down	Launched	Sea trials	Commissioning	Homeport	Status
Vikrant	R11	45,000	28 February 2009	12 August 2013	2019	2 September 2022	Karwar	In active service
IAC-2	TBD	45,000	TBD	TBD	TBD	TBD	TBD	Proposed

== See also ==
- List of aircraft carriers of the Indian Navy
- Chinese aircraft carrier Shandong (indigenous Chinese STOBAR carrier)
