= IACIS =

IACIS may refer to:

- International Association for Computer Information Systems (IACIS; iacis.org), in business computing
- International Association of Computer Investigative Specialists (IACIS; iacis.com), in computer security
- CIS Interparliamentary Assembly (iacis.ru; Interparliamentary Assembly of Member Nations of the Commonwealth of Independent States; IPA-CIS), the parliamentary assembly of the transnational association CIS successor of the Soviet Union

== See also ==
- IACI (disambiguation), for the singular of IACIs
- lacis (disambiguation)
