= Tom Seymour (politician) =

American politician and emeritus professor

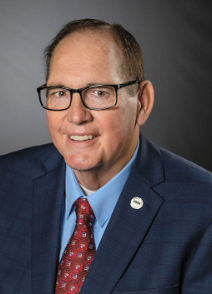

Member of the North Dakota Senate from the 5th district
- In office 2002–2010

Personal details
- Party: Democratic party

Tom Seymour is an American academic and former politician. He is a professor emeritus at Minot State University in Minot, North Dakota.

== Career ==
=== Academia ===
Seymour's academic career spans several states, including positions as a professor and administrator between 1970 and 1984. He taught at Minot State University from 1985 until his retirement in 2016 and served as the chair of the Business Information Technology Department from 2007 to 2009. He also held an adjunct professorship in management information systems at Central Michigan University from 1988 to 1991.

He is the former president of the Minot State Faculty Senate, the International Association for Computer Information Systems, and the North Dakota Council of College Faculties.

He is September 9, 2016 a professor emeritus at Minot State University.

=== Politics ===
Seymour served as a North Dakota State senator from 2002 to 2010. During his time in the Senate, Seymour represented the 5th District as a member of the Democratic Party.

== Recognition ==
Seymour has received numerous awards, including:

- 2009: Mayville State University Distinguished Alumni Award
- 2011: Ben Bauman Award for Excellence from the International Association for Computer Information Systems
