= INS Vikrant =

Two ships operated by the Indian Navy have had the name INS Vikrant.

- INS Vikrant (1961), a British-built aircraft carrier which was in service from 1961 to 1997, operated as a museum ship from 2002 to 2012 and was scrapped in 2014–2015.
- INS Vikrant (2013), a first Indian-built aircraft carrier which was launched in 2013, the first of two planned for the class, and commissioned on 2 September 2022.
