= IACS =

IACS may refer to:

- Indian Association for the Cultivation of Science
- Industrial Automation and Control Systems are also referred to as Industrial control systems
- Innovation Academy Charter School
- Integrated Administration and Control System
- International Annealed Copper Standard, a unit of electrical conductivity
- International Association of Classification Societies
- International Association of Cryospheric Sciences
- Inter-Asia Cultural Studies, a quarterly peer-reviewed academic journal
