= Lacis =

Lacis may refer to:

- Lācis, a Latvian last name
- Filet lace, a needle lace
