= International Academy of Cytology =

NGO for cytopathologists and cytologists

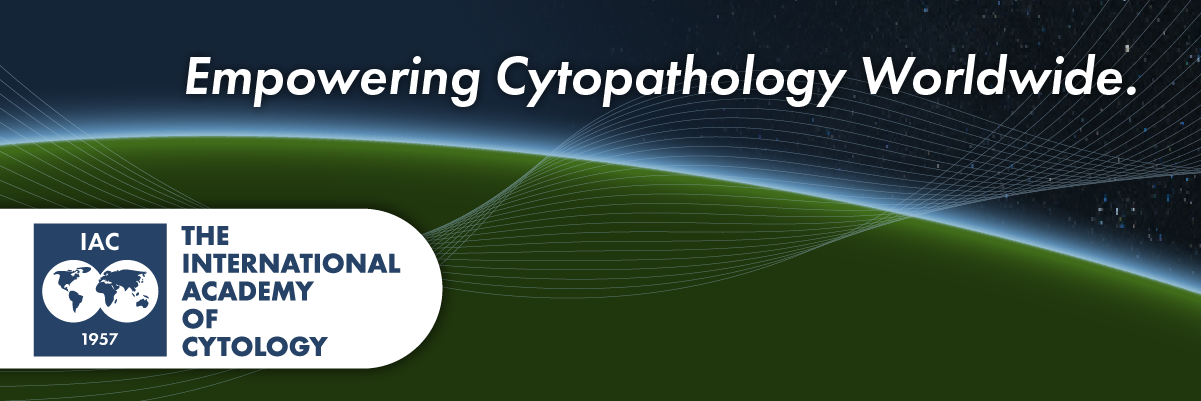
- Type: NGO
- Predecessor: International Academy of Gynecological Cytology
- Founded: 1957 in Brussels
- Key people: First president: Dr. Hans-Klaus Zinser; Honorary president: Dr. George N. Papanicolaou; Current president: Professor Syed Ali, MD,FRCPath, FIAC, Director of Cytopathology at the Department of Pathology at Johns Hopkins University, Baltimore, USA; Secretary-Treasurer: Dr. Massimo Bongiovanni, MD, FIAC, Director of Cytopathology Unilabs, Lausanne, Switzerland
- Services: Publication of Acta Cytologica
- Members: 1,420 (as of June 2026)
- Website: https://www.cytology-iac.org/

The International Academy of Cytology (IAC) is a scientific global NGO for cytopathologists and cytologists. The IAC's goals are the advancement of cytopathology and cytology and it promotes research, education and collaboration within the field.

== History ==
The IAC was founded in 1957 in Brussels by a committee of 27 individuals from 19 countries. George N. Papanicoloau was installed as Honorary President. The IAC's first president was Dr. Hans-Klaus Zinser The original name was International Academy of Gynecological Cytology, the IAC renamed itself International Academy of Cytology in 1961 to reflect advances in other fields.

== Structure ==
The IAC is an international umbrella association working together with over 50 national cytology associations including the American Society of Cytopathology, the Società Italiana di Anatomia Patologica e Citologia Diagnostica, the Academía Mexicana de Citopatológica and the European Federation of Cytology Societies.

The current president is Syed Ali, Director of Cytopathology at the Department of Pathology at Johns Hopkins University, Baltimore, USA.

== Publications ==
The IAC issues the journal Acta Cytologica at the publishing house Karger. The Acta Cytologica was founded by George L. Wied in 1957, the founding year of the IAC. He served as editor-in-chief until 2004.

In collaboration with the WHO, especially the IARC the IAC works on the definition of international nomenclature of tumors. Together they have published four books: One on the reporting system of lung cytopathology, one on the reporting system of pancreaticobiliary cytopathology., one on the reporting system for lymph node, spleen, and Thymus Cytopathology. The latest WHO reporting system for soft tissue cytopathology was published in 2026.
