= INS Vikrant (2013) =

Indian Navy aircraft carrier

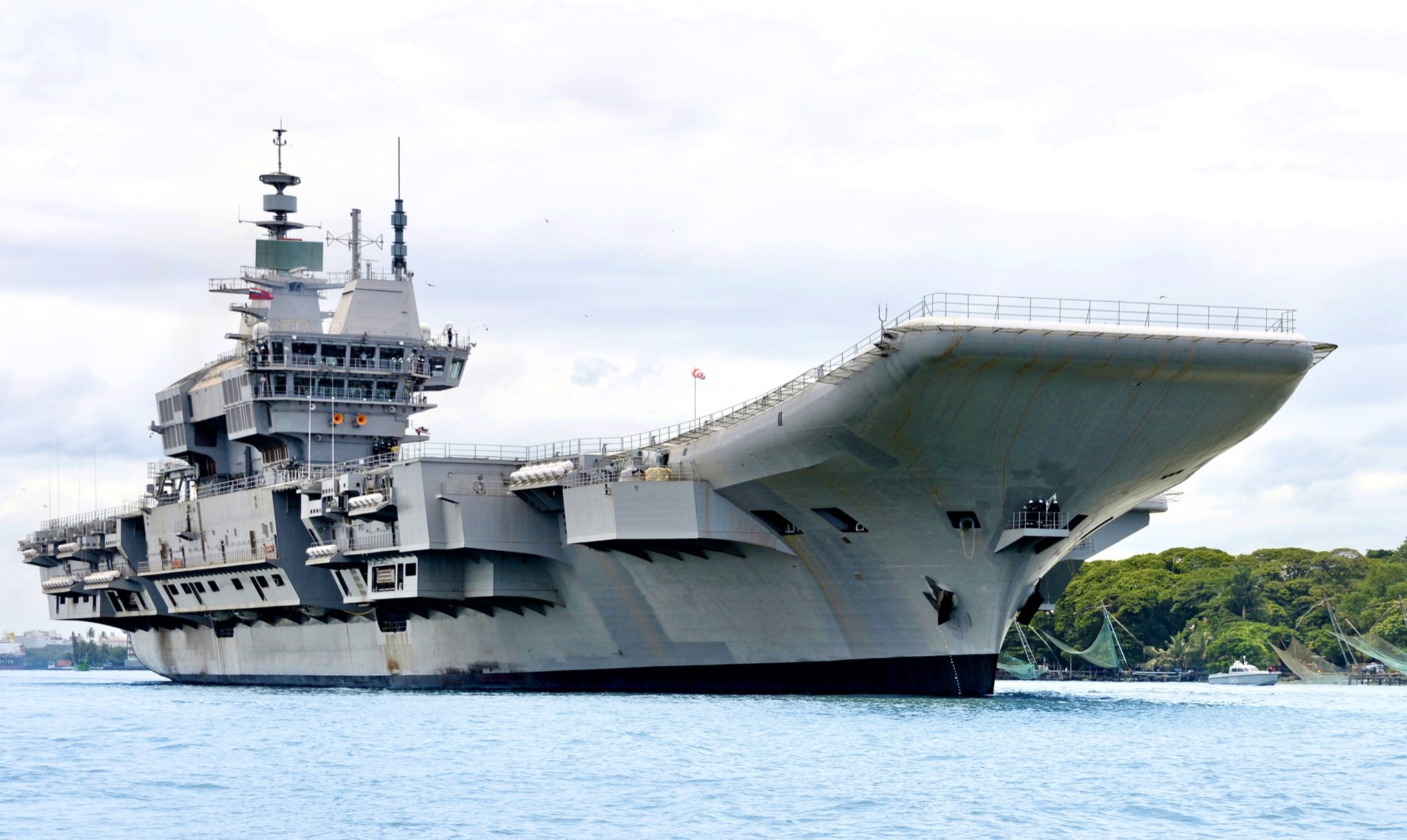
- INS Vikrant in 2022

History

India
- Name: Vikrant
- Namesake: Vikrant (1961)
- Operator: Indian Navy
- Ordered: 2004
- Builder: Cochin Shipyard Limited
- Cost: ₹23,000 crore (equivalent to ₹280 billion or US$2.9 billion in 2026)
- Laid down: 28 February 2009
- Launched: 12 August 2013
- Acquired: 28 July 2022
- Commissioned: 2 September 2022
- Identification: Pennant number: R11
- Motto: जयेम सं युधिस्पृधः (Sanskrit); "I defeat those who dare to fight against me" (translated)
- Nickname(s): IAC-1
- Status: Active
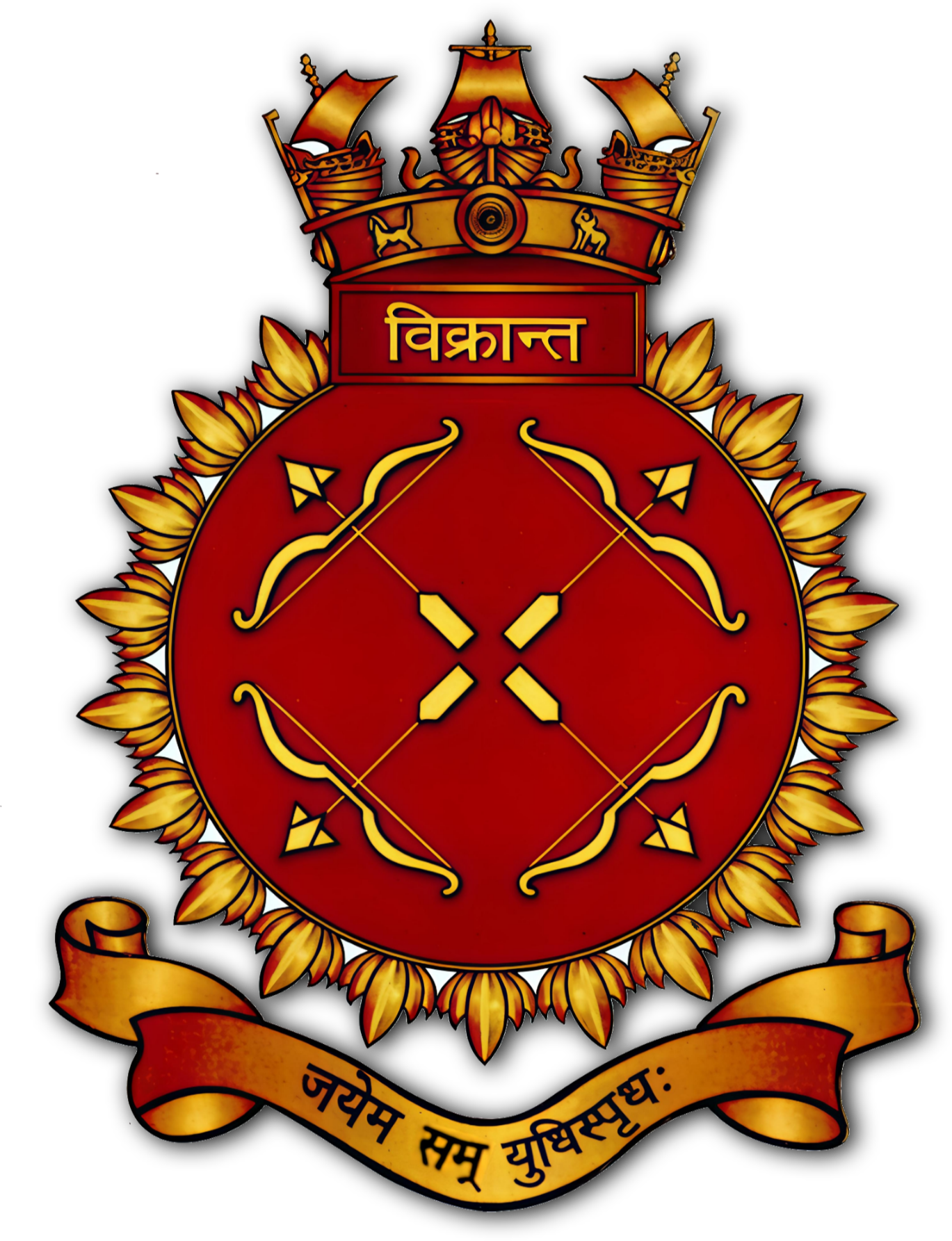
- Badge

General characteristics
- Class & type: Vikrant-class aircraft carrier
- Displacement: 45,000 tonnes of loaded displacement; 45,000 tonnes (44,000 long tons; 50,000 short tons) standard
- Length: 262.5 m (861 ft)
- Beam: 62 m (203 ft)
- Height: 59 m (194 ft)
- Draught: 8.4 m (28 ft)
- Depth: 25.6 m (84 ft)
- Decks: 14
- Propulsion: 4 × General Electric LM2500 Gas Turbine (100 MW); 2 × Elecon COGAG Gearbox
- Speed: 30 kn (56 km/h; 35 mph)
- Range: 8,000 nmi (15,000 km; 9,200 mi)
- Crew: 196 officers, 1,449 sailors (including air crew)
- Sensors & processing systems: Elta EL/M-2248 MF-STAR AESA multifunction radar; Selex RAN-40L 3D L-Band Air Surveillance Radar
- Electronic warfare & decoys: DRDO Shakti EW suite; Kavach anti-missile system; Maareech Advanced Torpedo Defence System
- Armament: 2 × 32 cell VLS Barak 8 SAM (range: 0.5 km (0.31 mi) to 100 km (62 mi); 4 × AK-630 CIWS; 5 x OFT 12.7 mm M2 Stabilized Remote Controlled Gun
- Aircraft carried: 36 aircraft: Fixed-wing: Mikoyan MiG-29K carrier-based multirole fighter; Rafale M (on order); HAL TEDBF (in development); Rotary-wing: Kamov Ka-31; MH-60R; HAL Dhruv
- Aviation facilities: 12,500 m^{2} flight deck

INS Vikrant is an aircraft carrier in service with the Indian Navy. The carrier is India's fourth carrier and the first to be built domestically. It was constructed by the Cochin Shipyard Limited (CSL). The name Vikrant is a tribute to India's first aircraft carrier INS Vikrant (1961). Vikrant means "courageous" in Sanskrit. The motto of the ship, "जयेम सम् युधिस्पृधः" (Sanskrit), means "I defeat those who dare to challenge me" (English). It is currently one of two active aircraft carriers in the Indian Navy, the other being the flagship INS Vikramaditya.

Work on the ship's design began in 1999. The keel was laid in 2009. The carrier was floated out of dry dock in December 2011 and launched in August 2013. Basin trials were completed in December 2020, and sea trials started in August 2021. Its commissioning ceremony was held on 2 September 2022. Aircraft flight trials have been completed in 2023. The total cost of the project is approximately ₹23,000 crore (equivalent to ₹280 billion or US$2.9 billion in 2026) at the time of first sea trials.

It is 262 metres (860 ft) in length, with a top speed of 28 knots (52 km/h; 32 mph) and endurance of 7,500 nautical miles (13,900 km; 8,600 mi). The ship has 2,300 compartments crewed by 1,700 sailors. It has a hospital complex, cabins for female officers, eight kilometres (5.0 mi) of corridors, and four General Electric LM2500 gas turbines.

== Background ==
In 1989, a plan was announced for constructing two aircraft carriers. It was set to decommission in 1997. In 1999, Defence Minister George Fernandes authorised the development and construction of an aircraft carrier, INS Vikrant, under the Project 71 Air Defence Ship (ADS). By that time, given the ageing Sea Harrier fleet, the letter of intent called for a carrier that would carry more modern jet fighters. In 2001, Cochin Shipyard Limited (CSL) released a graphic illustration showing a 32,000-tonne (35,000-short-ton) STOBAR (Short Take-Off, Barrier-Arrested Recovery) design with a pronounced ski jump.

The aircraft carrier project received formal government approval in January 2003. By then, design updates called for a 37,500-tonne (41,300-short-ton) carrier to operate the Mikoyan MiG-29K. India opted for a three-carrier fleet consisting of one carrier battle group stationed on each seaboard, and a third carrier held in reserve, in order to continuously protect both its flanks, to protect economic interests and mercantile traffic, and to provide humanitarian platforms in times of disasters, since a carrier can provide a self-generating supply of fresh water, medical assistance or engineering expertise to populations in need for assistance.

In August 2006, Chief of the Naval Staff Admiral Arun Prakash stated that the designation for the vessel had been changed from Air Defence Ship (ADS) to Indigenous Aircraft Carrier (IAC). The euphemistic ADS had been adopted in planning stages to ward off concerns about a naval build-up. Final revisions to the design increased the displacement of the carrier from 37,500 tons to over 45,000 tons. The length of the ship increased from 252 metres (827 ft) to 262 metres (860 ft).

== Design ==
A schematic diagram of INS Vikrant

INS Vikrant is 262 metres (860 ft) long and 62 metres (203 ft) wide, and displaces about 45,000 tonnes (50,000 short tons). It features a STOBAR configuration. It can carry an air group of up to thirty-six aircraft, including 26 fixed-wing combat aircraft, and a mix of Dhruv MK-III, Sikorsky MH-60R and Kamov Ka-31 helicopters. The Ka-31 will fulfil the airborne early warning (AEW) role, MH-60R will provide anti-surface and anti-submarine warfare (ASW) capabilities, and Dhruv will be used mainly for search and rescue operations.

Vikrant is powered by four General Electric LM2500+ gas turbines on two shafts, generating over 80 megawatts (110,000 hp) of power. The gearboxes for the carriers were designed and supplied by Elecon Engineering.

The ship's combat management system (CMS) was developed by Tata Advanced Systems. It is the first CMS developed by a private company for the Indian Navy and was handed over to the Navy on 28 March 2019.

=== Components ===
- Flight deck: The flight deck measures an area of 12,450 square metres (134,000 sq ft). 12 fighter jets and 6 helicopters can be parked on the flight deck to respond immediately to an emergency situation. There is one shorter runway, and one longer runway accompanied by a 14° ski-jump for take-off. The flight deck is equipped with 2 restraining gears for take-off and 3 arresting gears (20 tonne steel cables) for landing. The deck features non-skid paint and Saturn Lighting System for night-time operations.
- Aircraft hangar: The hangar is situated 5 decks below the flight deck and has a 20 aircraft-capacity. It is equipped with 2 hydraulic 360° rotatable turntables, which are circular revolving platforms to turn an aircraft in any direction. The carrier has 2 giant elevators of 30 tonnes (30,000 kg) payload capacity. This is opposed to the INS Vikramaditya which has only one elevator in the centre of the flight deck. The centre placement implies that the flight operations are needed to be stopped during elevator operations and vice versa. Vikrant's elevator configuration negates this limitation.
- Damage Control HQ (DCHQ): The DCHQ is tasked with preventing fire and floods on the vessel. There are over 3,000 fire sensors and 700 flood sensors on the ship. DCHQ is staffed around-the-clock to monitor and mitigating fire and flooding.
- Operations (Ops) Room: The Ops Room is responsible for all the decisions for all the operations of not only the ship but also of the Carrier Battle Group accompanying it. The decisions on which gun or aircraft is to be deployed, the formation of the CBG, etc. is planned and executed from the Ops Room. It includes the Combat Management System, weapons controls and sensors, electronic charts, radar controls among other equipments. The Maritime Domain Awareness System also gives an insight on the position of all ships present in the Indian Ocean Region.
- Ship Control Centre (SCC): This is the command and control centre of the aircraft carrier. Every system on board the ship is controlled and operated from the SCC.
- The Bridge of the ship is commanded by the Captain of the ship. Beside the Bridge, the Flight Control Position (FLYCO) is located. This is similar to an air traffic control tower of an airfield. It is at a height of 10 metres above the flight deck, providing all-round clear visibility of flight-deck, technical positions and as the helicopter landing spots. FLYCO is equipped with Automatic Weather Observations System (AWOS), a set of sensors which continually monitors various parameters crucial for flying such as temperature, pressure, relative humidity, wind speed and wind direction.
- Medical facilities: The ship houses a 16-bed hospital operated by five medical officers and 25 assistants. There are several wards inside the facility including a medical/general ward, an isolation ward, a female ward, and a casualty and ICU. It is capable to handle any kind of emergency on board the ship. A CT scan facility is also present.

=== Carrier Air Group ===
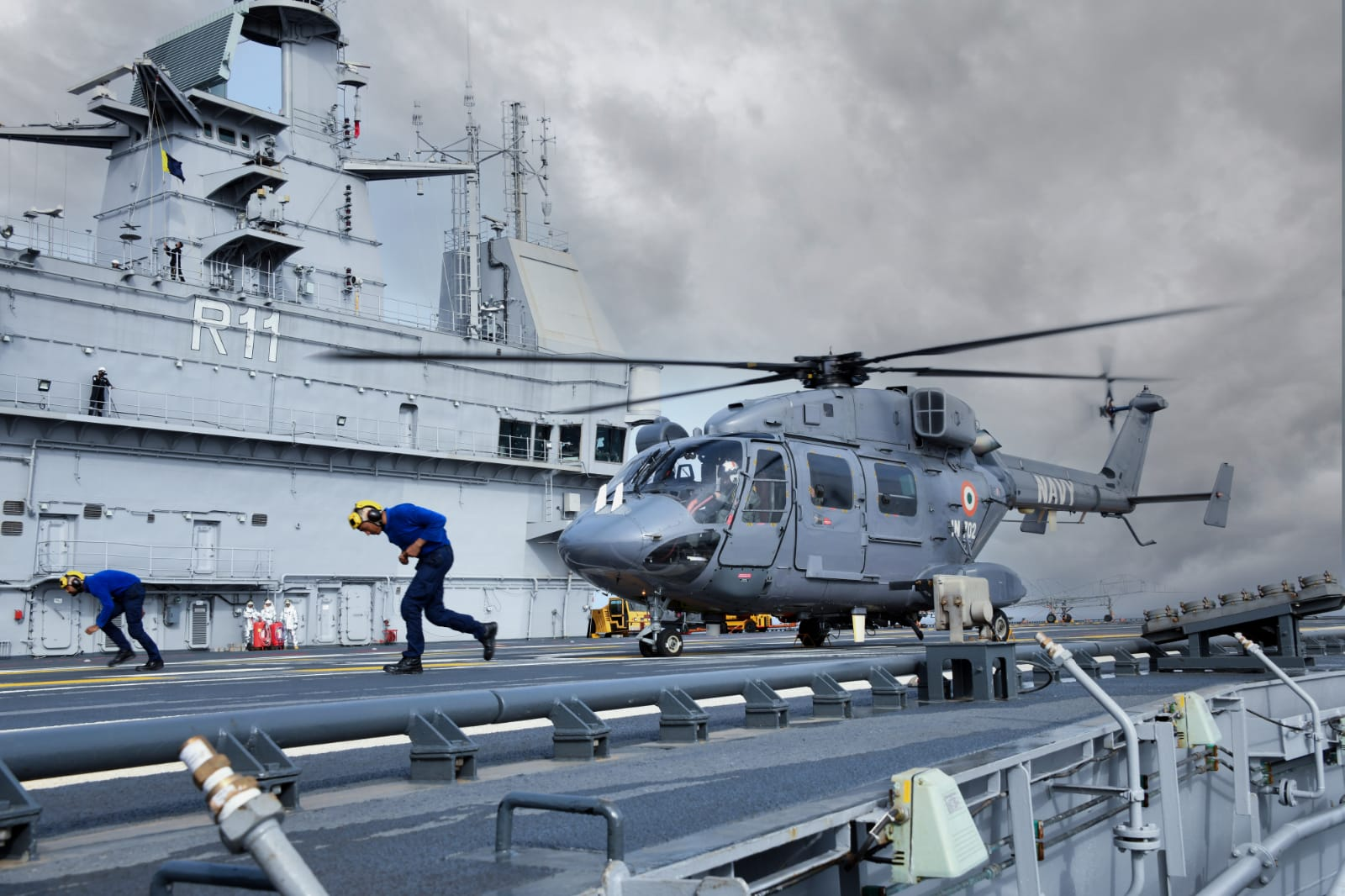
HAL Dhruv on board Vikrant during sea trials

Vikrant's air group can consist up to 22 Rafale M fighters and up to 4 Kamov Ka-31, or 2 HAL Dhruv NUH or 4 MH-60R helicopters.

==== TEDBF and MiG-29K ====
Earlier, the Indian Navy considered fielding the MiG-29K, and the LCA Navy on Vikrant. At the same time in 2009, the then Navy Chief Admiral Nirmal Kumar Verma hinted that the Navy was carrying out a concept study for a more capable naval fighter,

In 2016 the Navy announced that the Tejas was overweight for carrier operations, and other alternatives would be looked at.

The maiden landing of a MiG-29K on board INS Vikrant (R11)

During the Aero India 2021, the concept of a HAL TEDBF (Twin Engine Deck Based Fighter) was unveiled. The TEDBF is to be introduced in service by 2038. Naval Tejas being a technology demonstrator development of niche technology for deck based fighter operations, paving the way for TEDBF. Vikrant's Carrier Air Group's fighter jet component is currently fulfilled by 12 MiG-29Ks. The Navy could also transfer a squadron of MiG-29K to INS Dega to form the Carrier Air Group of the aircraft carrier until the arrival of Rafale.

==== Rafale ====
By December 2020, the number of fighters for the MRCBF was reduced to 36 amid a proposal by India's DRDO and ADA to develop the HAL TEDBF indigenously. There were also plans to merge the MRCBF procurement with the IAF's MRFA. That same month, Boeing Defense, Space & Security, in coordination with the United States Navy, demonstrated the F/A-18's capability to operate from a STOBAR carrier at Naval Air Station Patuxent River by conducting eight ski-jumps.

For the optimum utilisation of Rafale from the carrier, some changes in the elevators would be necessary in the carrier. Further, the wing pylons would have to be removed from the jets during lift operations, that is, transferring the jets from hangar to flight deck and vice versa.

On April 28, 2025, the Indian Navy signed a deal of 26 Rafale M fighters with France, for which deliveries are to start from 2030.

=== Carrier Battle Group ===
After commissioning, Vikrant was initially based at INS Kadamba at Karwar. However, the ship's home base will be changed to Visakhapatnam after the development of certain infrastructures in the Eastern Seaboard. This will lead to the operationalisation of a Carrier Battle Group (CBG) under the Eastern Fleet which will include the Delhi-class destroyers, Nilgiri-class frigate and Kamorta-class corvette. As of December 2024, an aircraft carrier berth is under construction in the naval outer area of Visakhapatnam Naval Base.

== Construction ==
IAC-1 on its maiden sea voyage

Vikrant is the first aircraft carrier to be designed by the Warship Design Bureau (formerly Directorate of Naval Design) of the Indian Navy and the first warship to be built by Cochin Shipyard. Its construction involved participation of a large number of private and public firms.

The Defence Metallurgical Research Laboratory (DMRL) and Steel Authority of India Limited (SAIL) created facilities to manufacture the DMR 249 grade steel in India. Reportedly, 26,000 tonnes (26,000 long tons; 29,000 short tons) of three types of special steel for the hull, flight deck and floor compartments were manufactured at the Bokaro Steel Plant (Jharkhand), Bhilai Steel Plant (Chhattisgarh) and Rourkela Steel Plant (Odisha). Due to this, Vikrant is the first ship of the Indian Navy to be built completely using domestically produced steel.

The main switch board, steering gear and water tight hatches have been manufactured by Larsen & Toubro in Mumbai and Talegaon; high-capacity air conditioning and refrigeration systems have been manufactured in Kirloskar Group's plants in Pune; most pumps have been supplied by Best and Crompton; Bharat Heavy Electricals (BHEL) supplied the Integrated Platform Management System (IPMS), which is being installed by Avio, an Italian company; the gear box was supplied by Elecon Engineering; and the electrical cables are being supplied by Nicco Industries. Fincantieri provided consultancy for the propulsion package while Russia's Nevskoye Design Bureau designed the aviation complex.

The keel for Vikrant was laid by Defence Minister A.K. Antony at the Cochin Shipyard on 28 February 2009. The ship uses modular construction, with 874 blocks joined for the hull. By the time the keel was laid, 423 blocks weighing over 8,000 tons had been completed. In August 2011, the Defence Ministry reported to the Lok Sabha that 75% of the construction work for the hull of the lead carrier had been completed and the carrier would be first launched in December 2011, following which further works would be completed until commissioning. On 29 December 2011, the completed hull of the carrier was first floated out of its dry dock at CSL, with its displacement at over 14,000 tonnes (14,000 long tons; 15,000 short tons). Interior works and fittings on the hull would be carried out until the second half of 2012, when it would again be dry-docked for integration with its propulsion and power generation systems. By late 2012, work commenced for the next stage of construction, which included the installation of the integrated propulsion system, the superstructure, the upper decks, the cabling, sensors and weapons.Shortly before launch on 21st March 2013, the Indian Coast Guard vessel ICGS Abheek, which was in advanced stages of fitting out in the same drydock but ahead of Vikrant was slowly winched over the ship on specially designed cradles before being launched by itself into the water by dock technicians.

=== Launch ===
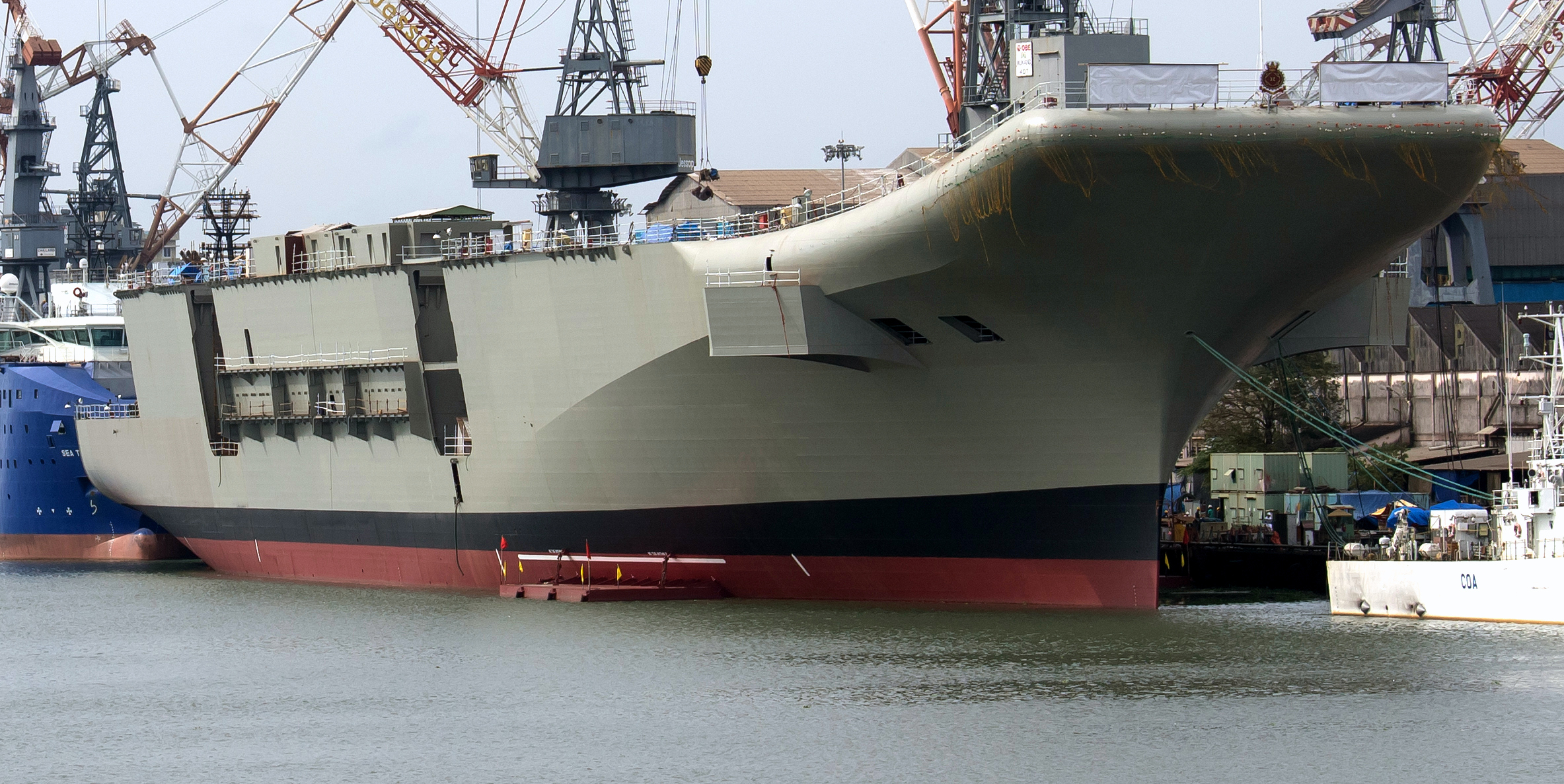
INS Vikrant during its launch in August 2013

In July 2013, Defence Minister Antony announced that Vikrant would be launched on 12 August at the Cochin Shipyard. The ship was launched by his wife, Elizabeth Antony, on 12 August 2013.

According to Admiral Robin K. Dhowan, about 83% of the fabrication work and 75% of the construction work had been completed at the time of launching. He said that 90% of the body work of the aircraft carrier had been designed and made in India, about 50% of the propulsion system, and about 30% of its weaponry. He also said that the ship would be equipped with a long range missile system with multi-function radar and a close-in weapon system (CIWS). After the launch, Vikrant would be re-docked for the second phase of construction, in which the ship would be fitted with various weapons and sensors, and the propulsion system, flight deck and the aircraft complex would be integrated.

=== Undocking and fitting-out ===
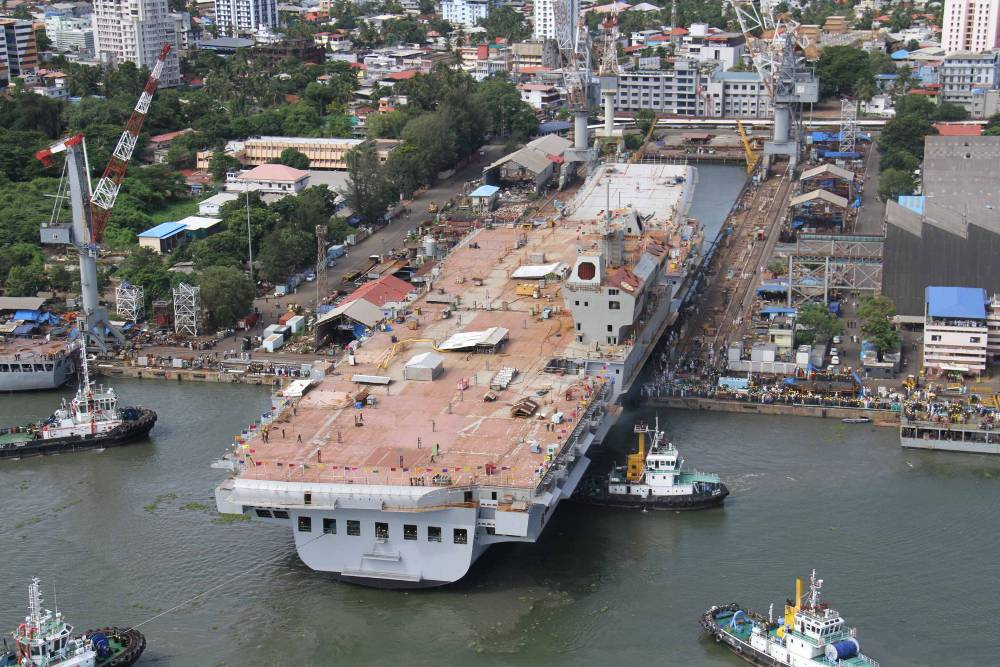
INS Vikrant during its undocking in June 2015

Vikrant was undocked on 10 June 2015 after the completion of structural work. Cabling, piping, heat and ventilation works were scheduled to be completed by 2017 with sea trials to begin thereafter. By October 2015, the construction of the hull was close to 98 percent complete, with flight deck construction underway. The installation of machinery, piping and the propeller shafts was in progress by January 2016; it was reported, however, that there were delays in the delivery of equipment from Russia for the carrier's aviation complex. By May 2017, the carrier's fitting-out was 62% complete, with trials of the auxiliary systems scheduled by late 2017.

In February 2020, all major structural and outfitting work was declared complete.

=== Harbour and sea trials ===
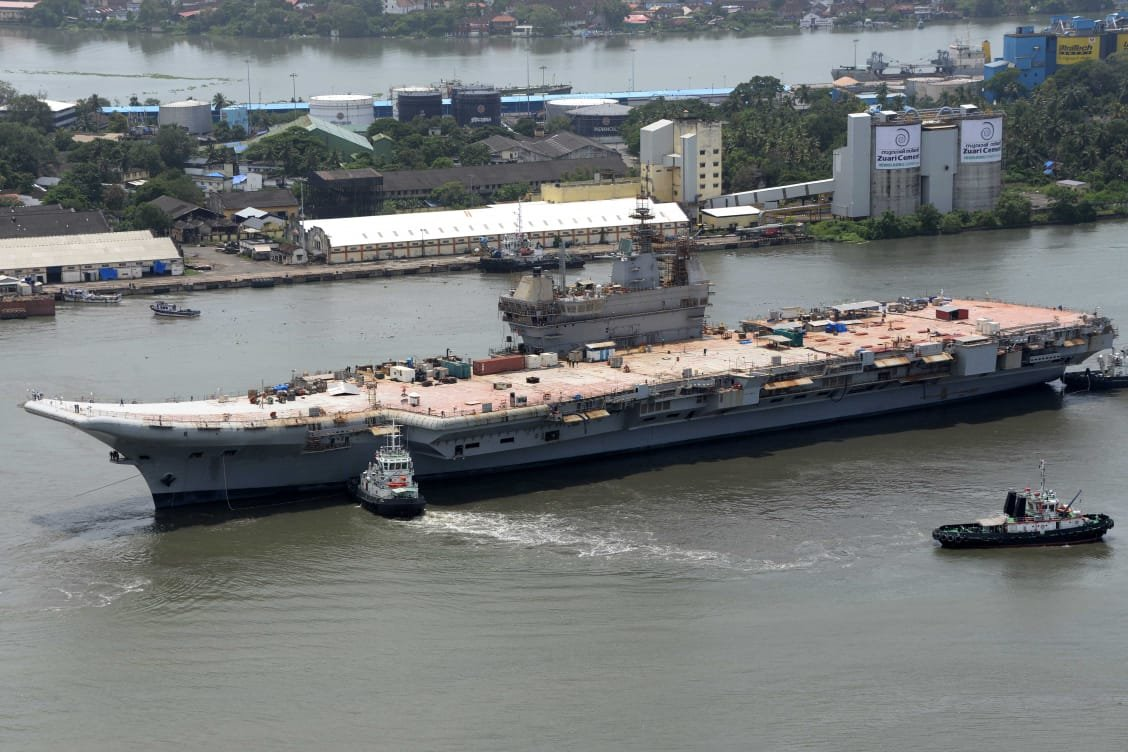
Basin trials of the aircraft carrier

On 31 October 2019, Cochin Shipyard received a ₹30 billion (equivalent to ₹41 billion or US$420 million in 2026) contract for the Phase-III of the project. This contract included funds for the harbour trials, sea trials and support for the ship during its weapons and aviation trials after its delivery. In December 2019, it was reported the engines had been switched on. By September 2020, Vikrant had completed harbour trials while the basin trials started from October 2020 to check propulsion, electric transmission and shafting systems. On 30 November 2020, the basin trials were completed, paving the way for sea trials, the final phase of the IAC-I project. As of 4 December 2020, the aircraft carrier was to be inducted in 2022–23.

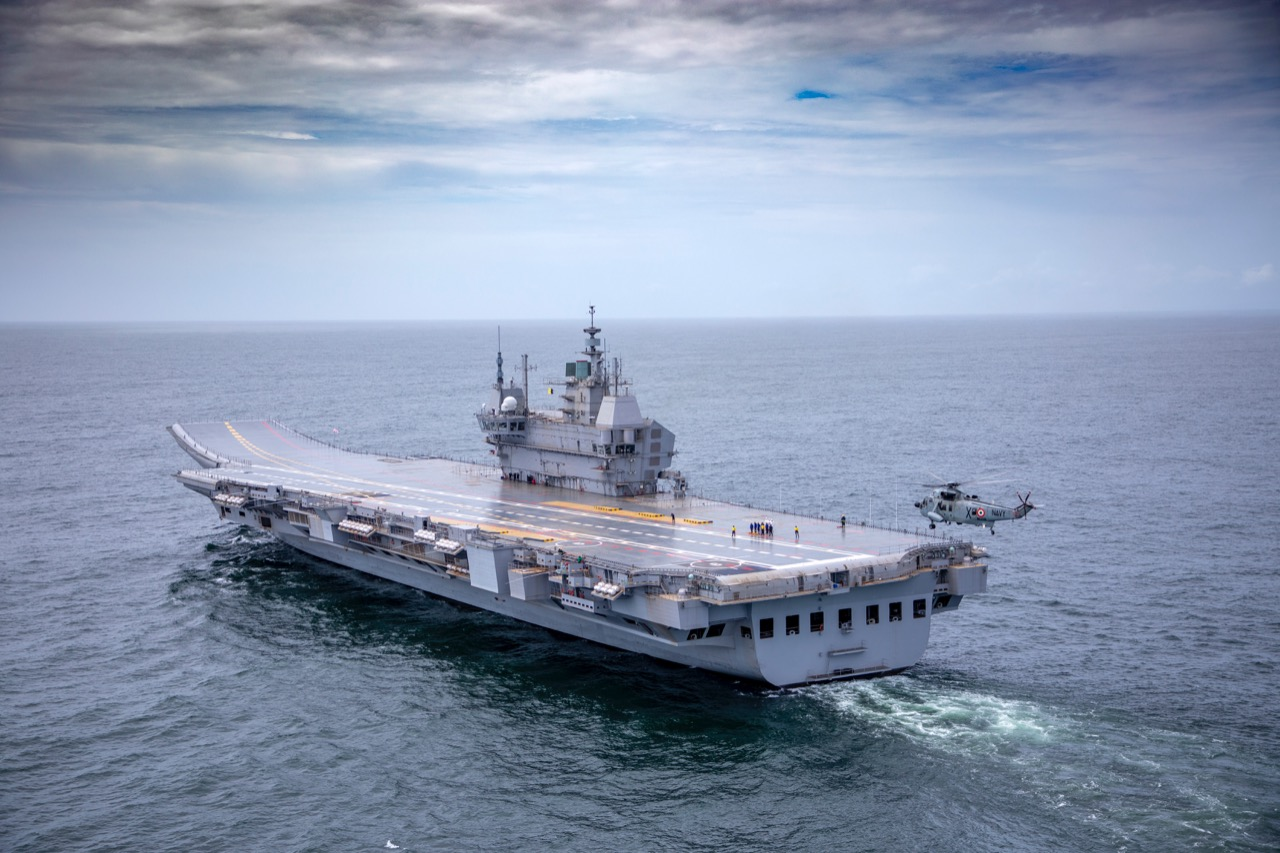
A Westland WS-61 Sea King approaches Vikrant while on sea trials.

In April 2021, it was reported that work had begun to integrate Barak 8 (or LR-SAM) on board Vikrant. On 15 June 2021, Vikrant was moved to the Ernakulam Wharf in Kochi, Kerala. On 4 August 2021, sea trials finally began. The first phase of the sea trials was successfully completed on 8 August 2021. The second phase of the trials was conducted on 24 October 2021, followed by the third phase from 9–17 January 2022, both of which were completed successfully. On 10 July, the fourth and final phase of the sea trials was successfully completed. This phase involved integrated trials of most of the equipment and systems aboard Vikrant, including portions of the Aviation Facilities Complex. On 26 May 2023 Indian built Mikoyan MiG-29K successfully landed on its deck during night sea trials lauding praise from defense ministry for Navy's dependence on Atmanirbhar Bharat.

=== Completion and commissioning ===
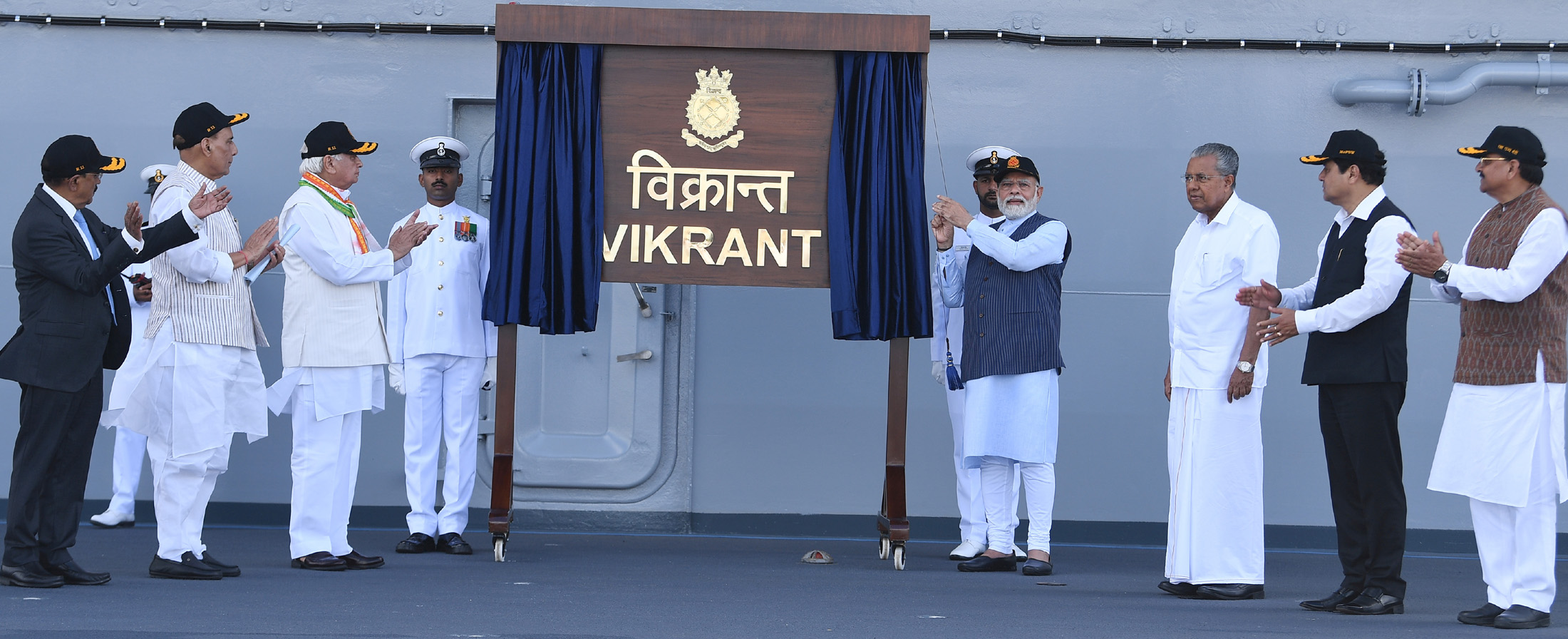
Prime Minister Narendra Modi commissioned INS Vikrant on 2 September 2022 in Kochi, Kerala.

INS Vikrant was delivered to the Indian Navy on 28 July 2022. Prime Minister Narendra Modi commissioned INS Vikrant on 2 September 2022 in a grand ceremony at Cochin Shipyard. Flight trials of its aircraft complement are expected to be completed by mid-2023, after which the ship will be fully operational.

On 6 February 2023, two arrested landings and subsequent take-offs were carried out by a HAL Tejas Naval prototype followed by a MiG-29K. On 22 March 2023, the Vice Chief of Navy Staff, Vice Admiral SN Ghormade, returned the bell originally placed on the previous Vikrant to Commodore Vidhyadhar Harke, the new ship's first commanding officer. In 1997, the bell of the decommissioned namesake ship was placed at the residence of Indian Navy Vice Chief, 5 Motilal Nehru Marg, New Delhi.

=== Homeport ===
In March 2020, it was revealed that after its commissioning, the Navy wants to lease a 260 m berth at Larsen & Toubro's shipyard in Kattupalli near Chennai between 2022 and 2030 to deploy INS Vikrant. This was an interim solution until the planned naval base INS Varsha at Rambilli near Vishakhapatnam would by ready.

Again, it was reported in 2021 that INS Vikrant's home base will be changed from Karwar to Visakhapatnam after the development of certain infrastructures in the Eastern Seaboard. As of December 2024, an aircraft carrier berth is under construction in the naval outer area of Visakhapatnam Naval Base. Until the construction ends for the permanent base, the carrier will periodically operate in the Eastern Seaboard.

=== Project delays ===
The construction plan originally called for the carrier to be launched in 2010, sea trials to commence in 2013, and to be commissioned in 2016. However, the project experienced some delays such as delay in the delivery of main gearboxes, aviation equipments etc., and cost overrun. The supplier of gearboxes, Elecon, attributed it to technical complexities due to the length of the propulsion shafts.

Part of the blame for the delay in delivery of Vikrant was attributed to the delay in the supply of aviation equipment from Russia. In response to a question in the Rajya Sabha, Sripad Naik, the Minister of State for Defence, stated: "Ship's targeted delivery was affected due to delay in supply of aviation equipment from Russia". Later due to the COVID-19 pandemic, sea trials of the carrier were further postponed to late 2020, but eventually began in August 2021. The carrier was commissioned on 2 September 2022.

LCA Tejas maiden landing on board INS Vikrant (R11)

== Service history ==
=== 2023 ===
In June 2023, the Indian Navy showcased the dual carrier operations including INS Vikrant and INS Vikramaditya. The exercise included 35 aircraft including MiG-29K, MH 60R, Kamov Ka 31, Sea King, Chetak and HAL Dhruv. This helped in the integration of the aircraft carriers of the Indian Navy.

In November 2023, INS Vikrant achieved fully operational status. Following this, the Indian Navy, had two full Carrier Battle Groups (CBG).

=== 2024 ===
In mid February 2024, INS Vikrant along with INS Vikramaditya participated in Milan 2024 multinational naval exercise hosted by Indian Navy along with other ships, submarines and aircraft of friendly foreign nations. The concluding ceremony of the sea phase of the exercise was hosted on board INS Vikrant.

In late February and early March 2024, INS Vikrant and INS Vikramaditya were deployed for conducting joint operations on various locations along the Indian coastline with escorts. In the first week of March, while INS Vikramaditya was hosting the first half of the Indian Navy's Biannual Naval Commanders' Conference 2024, both carriers launched MiG-29K fighters simultaneously. In addition, the carriers accommodated and conveyed numerous reporters to report on the commissioning ceremony of INS Jatayu, located on Minicoy Island in the Lakshadweep archipelago on the southwest coast of mainland India.

On 20 August 2024, INS Vikrant officially joined the Western Fleet, when deployed for a multi-domain exercise and twin carrier fighter operations in the Arabian Sea along with the Carrier Battle Group (CBG) led by INS Vikramaditya. The CBG included Kolkata-class destroyers and Talwar-class frigates. This was done after the completion of the guarantee refit and refit trials at Cochin Shipyard Limited (CSL) where it was fitted with Barak 8 missiles and EL/M-2248 MF-STAR radar. The carrier air wing included 30 aircraft and helicopters along with MiG-29K.

On 7 November 2024, the President of India, Droupadi Murmu, embarked on the indigenous carrier off the Goa coast from INS Hansa. The deployment included 15 frontline warships compromising 3 Kalvari class, 2 Shishumar class and 1 Sindhughosh-class submarine. Carrier operations of MiG-29K, missile firing drills, submarine manoeuvres and flypasts by 30 aircraft were also demonstrated.

On 3 December 2024, it was reported that INS Vikrant is fully operational after achieving Final Operational Clearance (FOC) after various trials in November 2023 and integration with the Western Fleet in August 2024.

=== 2025 ===
==== TROPEX 2025 ====
INS Vikrant was deployed for an overnight sea sortie as part of the AMPHEX and TROPEX 2025 exercise. Multiple senior officers from the three branches of the Armed Forces including Lt Gen Johnson P Mathew, Lt Gen N. S. Raja Subramani, VAdm K Swaminathan, Air Marshal SP Dharkar and Lt Gen Ajay Kumar embarked on the aircraft carrier on 30 January 2025 to witness the Joint Phase of the exercise off the West Coast. VCAS Air Marshal Dharkar arrived in a MiG-29KUB trainer enhancing jointness in the Armed Forces. Operations such as air strikes, anti-submarine drills, and amphibious landings were simulated. Following the exercise, Vikrant and INS Deepak responded to a distress call and conducted a MEDEVAC operation from MV Heilan Star, a Panama-flagged bulk carrier, located about 230 nautical miles off the coast of Goa. The rescued crew were immediately flown to INS Hansa using one of Vikrant's Westland Sea King helicopters.

==== 2025 India–Pakistan standoff ====
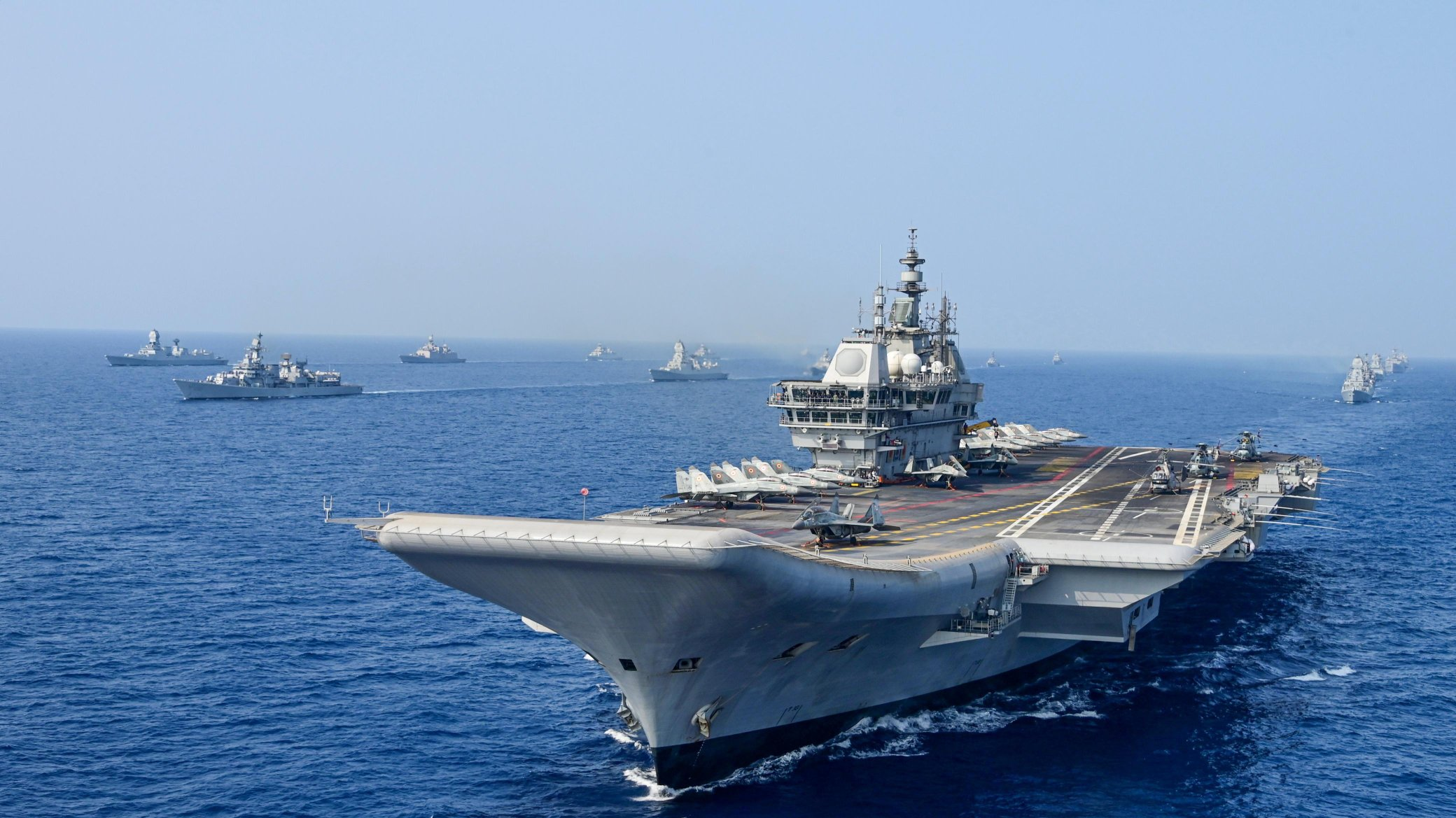
INS Vikrant Carrier Battle Group (CGB) deployed during Operation Sindoor

Amid 2025 India–Pakistan standoff following the 22 April's Pahalgam attack, INS Vikrant was deployed to the Arabian Sea. During Operation Sindoor, the Indian Navy had deployed a total of 36 warships which included an INS Vikrant-led Carrier Battle Group including 8 to 10 warships. The deployment included the entire fleet of seven Kolkata and Visakhapatnam-class destroyers with BrahMos and MRSAM missiles as well as seven frigates (including INS Tushil) and around six submarines. The ships deployed by the Indian Navy reportedly outnumbered both the numbers deployed by the Pakistan Navy and India's own deployment during Operation Trident and Operation Python in 1971 where six warships took part. According to the Director General of Naval Operations, the Navy was prepared to strike multiple Pakistani locations at any time including Karachi. The carrier battle group, surface combatants as well as submarines were deployed in the Northern Arabian Sea within 96 hours of the terrorist attack. According to the officer, the deployment also forced Pakistan's air and naval assets to remain in a "defensive posture". The aircraft carrier was forward deployed for four straight days after which it reportedly returned to its home base.

Defence Minister Rajnath Singh visited the ship in Goa on 30 May following the operational deployment. It was later reported that the Indian Navy had its target packages assigned and were on "hot-standby" to launch land-attack missiles at targets inside Pakistan multiple times. Targets included Pakistan Navy ships and submarines in harbour and other land targets. Both BrahMos and Klub submarine-launched cruise missile equipped platforms were deployed during Operation Sindoor. Reportedly, most of the Pakistani naval assets were kept back at harbour and the carrier's integral fighters, the MiG-29K fleet, kept the Pakistani aerial fleet under pressure during the standoff. Meanwhile, unspecified land-based naval assets were used to strike terror bases in Pakistan.The Indian media claimed that few days after the conflict, a MiG-29K had intercepted a lone Pakistani RAS-72 Sea Eagle, which was forced to return to base.

==== Exercise Konkan 2025 ====
Vikrant and its Carrier Battle Group (CBG) took part in the biennial Exercise Konkan 2025 with the Royal Navy's UK Carrier Strike Group 2025 (UK CSG 25), a formation with HMS Prince of Wales (R09), between 5 and 12 October 2025 off the Western Coast of India. This is the maiden instance of a dual carrier operation between the countries. While the UK CSG included HMS Richmond (F239) and RFA Tidespring (A136) along with HNoMS Roald Amundsen (F311) of the Royal Norwegian Navy and JS Akebono (DD-108) of the Japan Maritime Self-Defense Force, the Indian Navy's CBG included INS Kolkata (D63), INS Mormugao (D67), INS Surat (D69), INS Tabar (F44), INS Teg (F45) and INS Deepak (A50). The 2021 edition, named Konkan Shakti, was the largest exercise in the series in which all three services of both countries participated. On 8 October, the Indian Air Force deployed its Su-30MKI and Jaguar aircraft for a one-day exercise with the group.

The exercise included an aerial exercise conducted between Royal Air Force's F-35B and Vikrant's MiG-29K fleet. This was followed by a combined submarined hunt operation which included Royal Navy Merlin Mk2 helicopters operating from Prince of Wales and Richmond and Indian Navy P-8I Neptune aircraft trying to detect an Indian submarine.

==== International Fleet Review in Colombo ====
On 26 November 2025, Vikrant arrived at the Port of Colombo, Sri Lanka to participate in the International Fleet Review 2025 (IFR), held as part of the 75th anniversary of the Sri Lanka Navy. The ship was later joined by INS Udaygiri, commanded by Captain Vikas Sood. This also marked the maiden foreign port visit for both of the ships. The IFR is scheduled between 27 and 29 November.

As part of Operation Sagar Bandhu which was undertaken to provide disaster relief to the island nation after being hit by Cyclone Ditwah, both of the ship supplied the first tranche of relief materials. Sri Lankan defence officials had formally requested INS Vikrant for use for the rescue and relief operations that are underway. The ships delivered 9.5 tonnes of relief materials.

=== 2026 ===
INS Vikrant is the flagship of the Indian Navy at the International Fleet Review 2026 held in Visakhapatnam. She reached the East coast after completing a deployment to the Western coast by 16 February 2026. She conducted her thousandth take off and landing of MiG-29Ks in March 2026.

On 29 October, a Dassault Rafale M test aircraft conducted take-off and landing manoeuvres on Vikrant after completing their trials at the SBTF in INS Hansa. The trials form part of the contract signed in 2025 for 26 Rafale M fighters for Vikrant's carrier air wing and aims to validate the aircraft's India-specific modifications to integrate them with the aircraft carrier, especially the ones for STOBAR operations, and induct them into Indian Navy service. The Rafale belongs to the Marine Nationale fleet which operates from French aircraft carrier Charles de Gaulle. The modifications include a detachable missile rail on the wingtip of Rafale as a measure to accommodate the aircraft on the carrier and its elevators. Certain modifications are also being carried out on the elevators along with installation of specialised systems on Vikrant to integrate the aircraft. Similar changes will be necessary on INS Vikramaditya as well. A triangle landing aid similar to the one found on Charles de Gaulle was also seen onboard Vikrant during the landing.

== Commanding officers ==
Name	Took command	Left command	Notes
Captain Vidhyadhar Harke VSM	7 May 2021	31 December 2023	First CO of Vikrant. Current Flag Officer Commanding Maharashtra Naval Area.
Captain Birendra S Bains VSM	31 December 2023	5 June 2025	Commissioning CO of INS Visakhapatnam (D66).
Captain Ashok Rao NM	5 June 2025	Present	Previously CO of INS Visakhapatnam (D66).

== Gallery ==
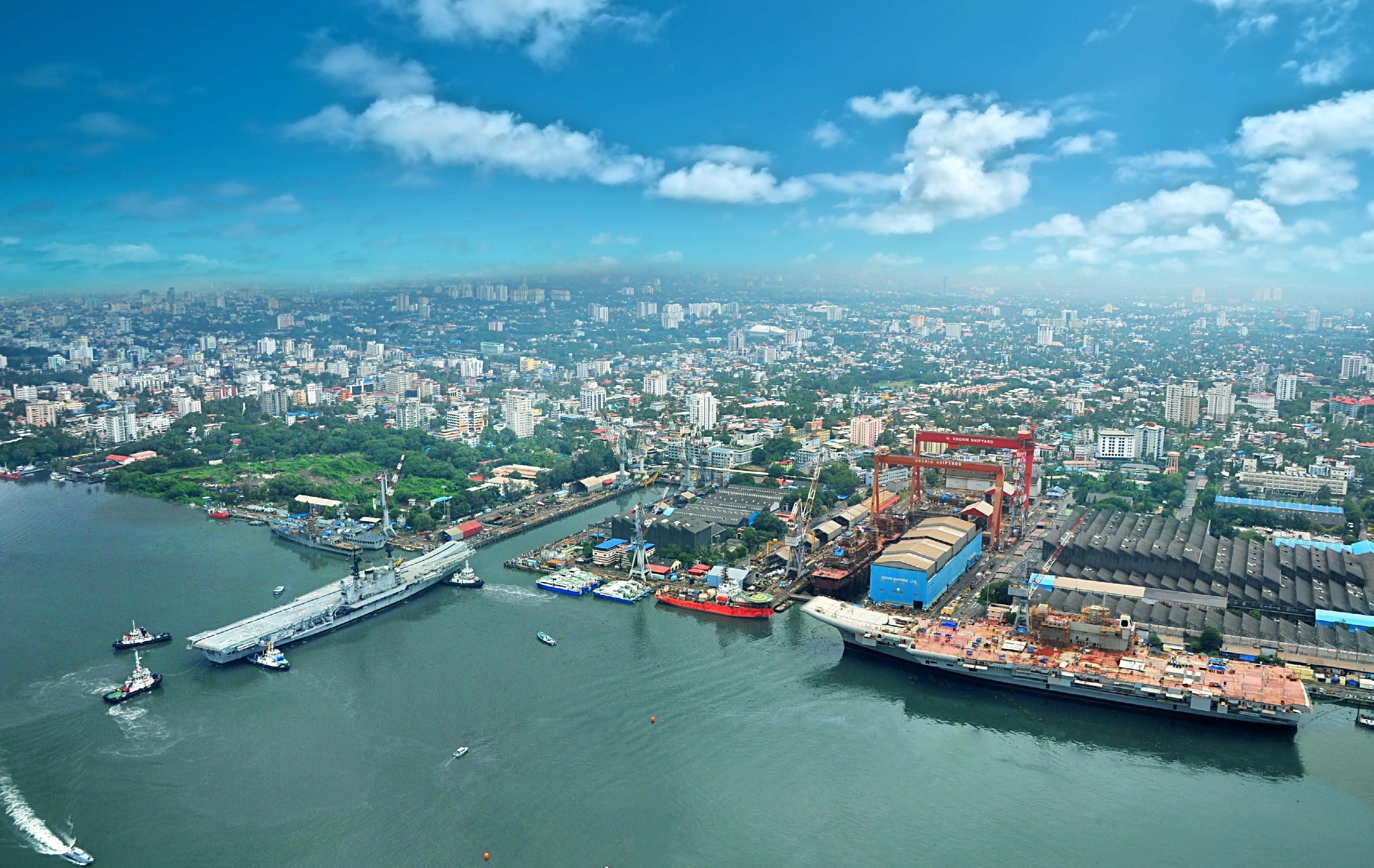
INS Viraat entering a drydock recently vacated by then under construction IAC-1

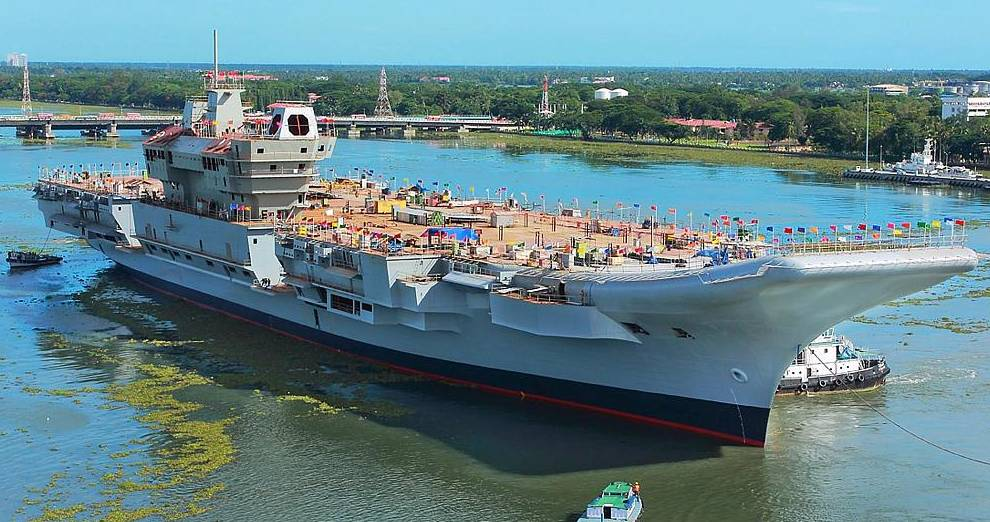
INS Vikrant after launch

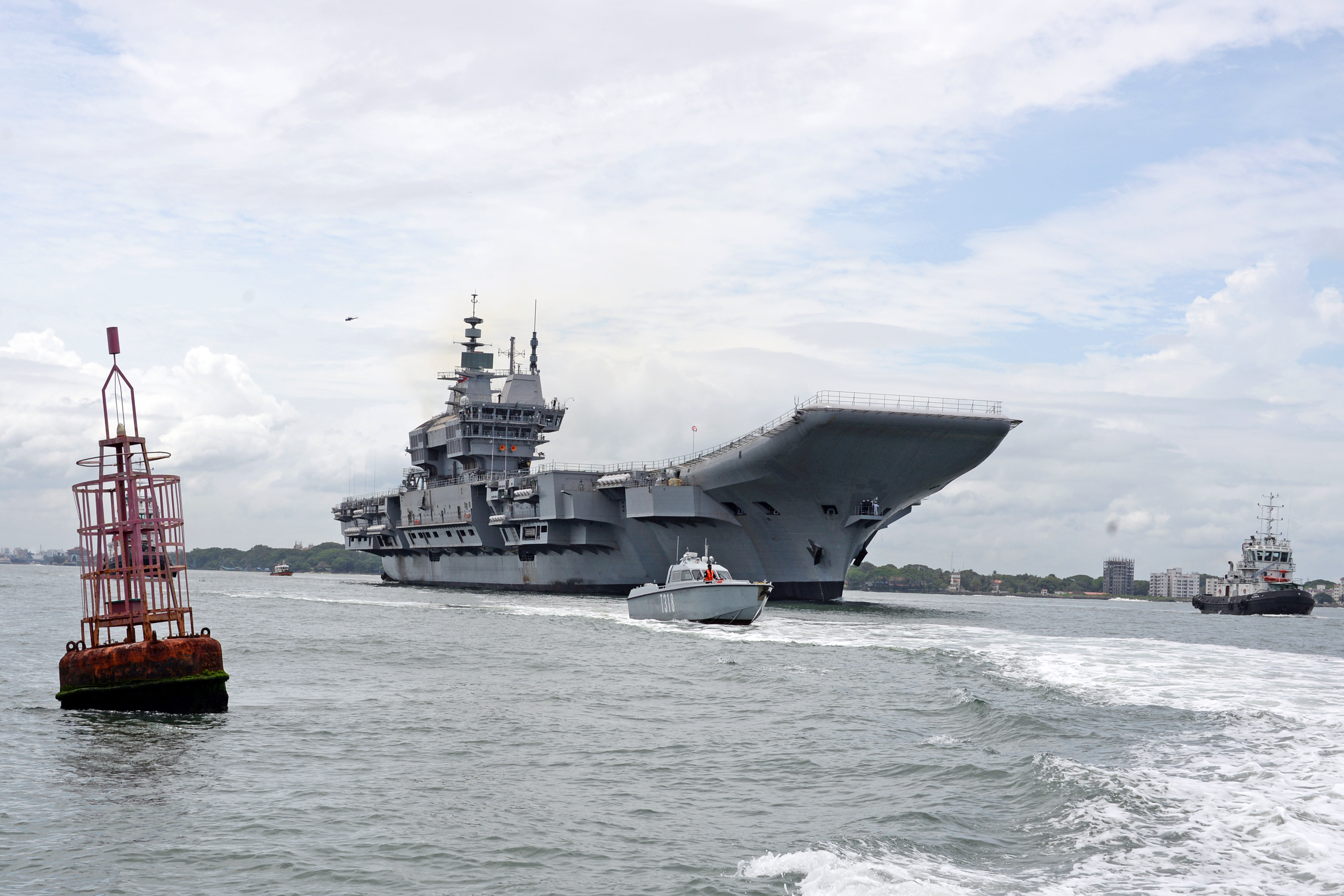
INS Vkrant exiting Cochin Harbour

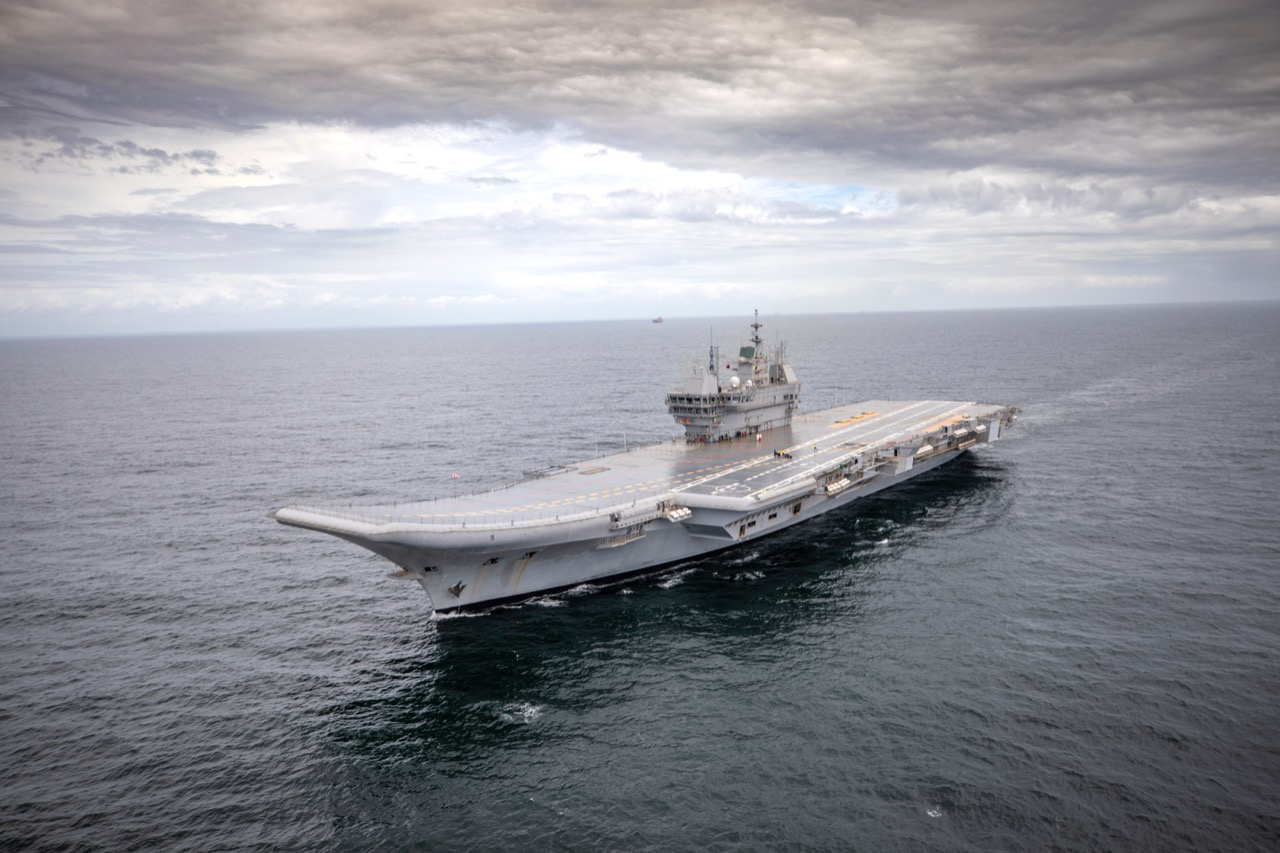
Vikrant during sea trials

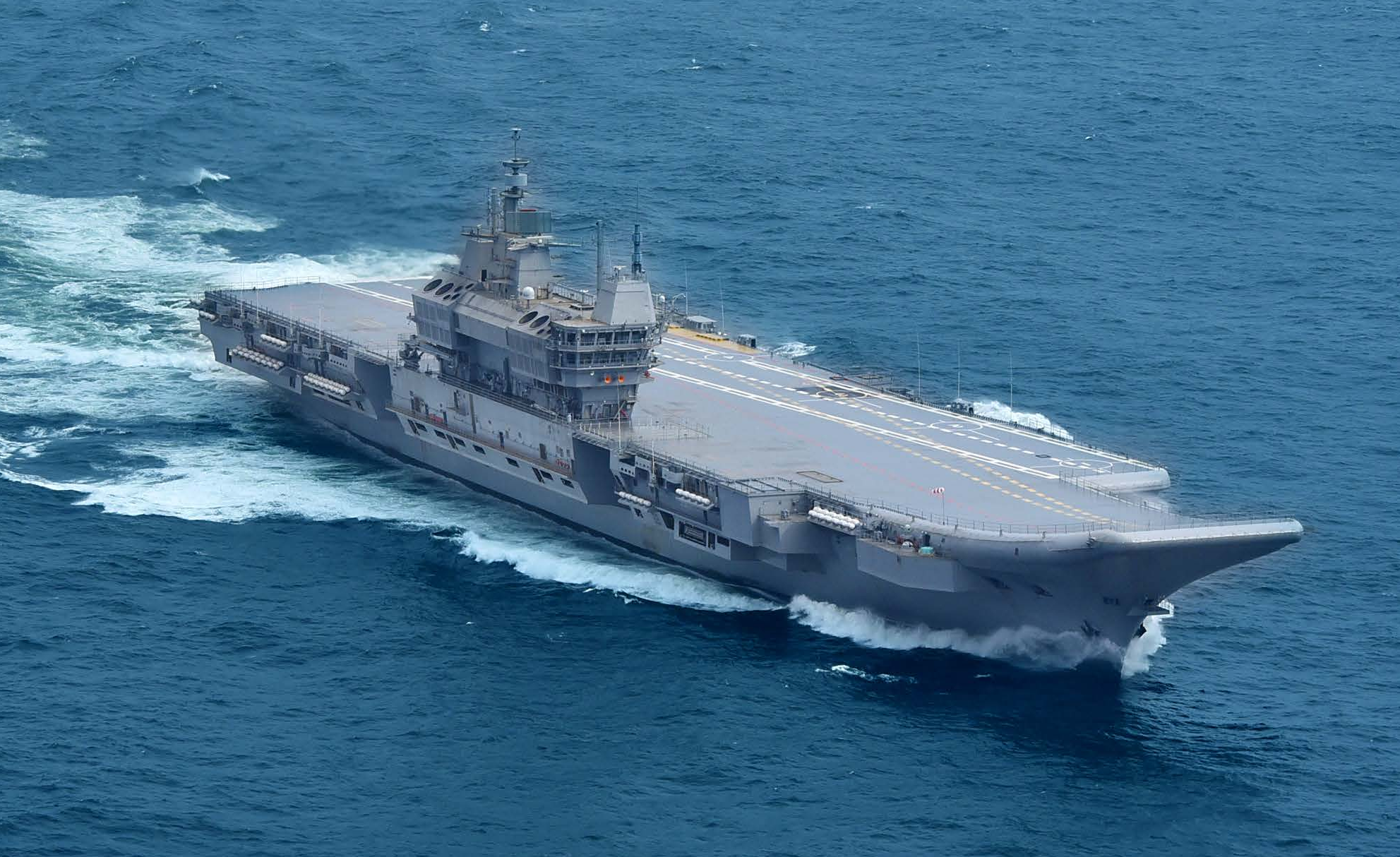
Vikrant during sea trials

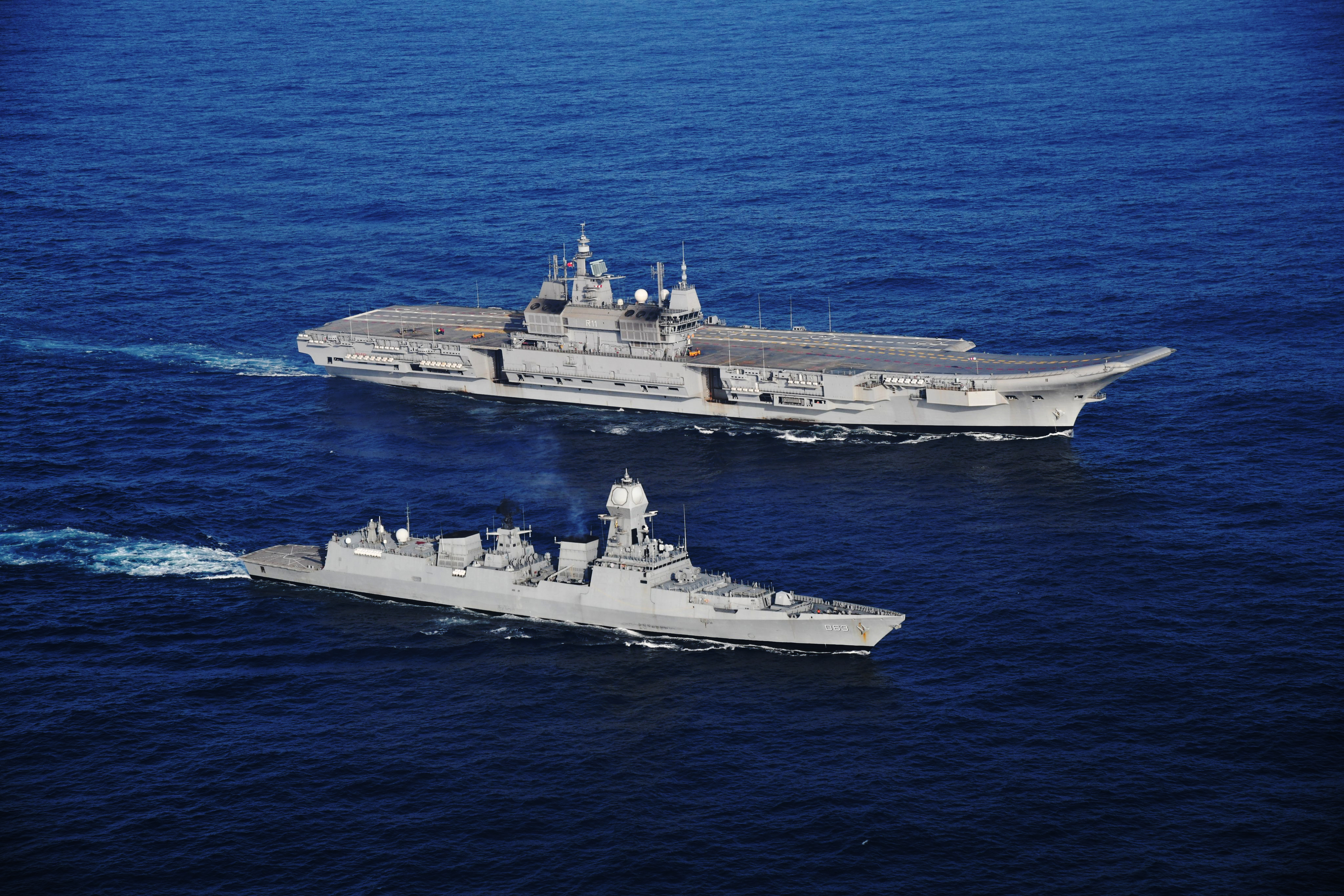
Vikrant with INS Kolkata during sea trials

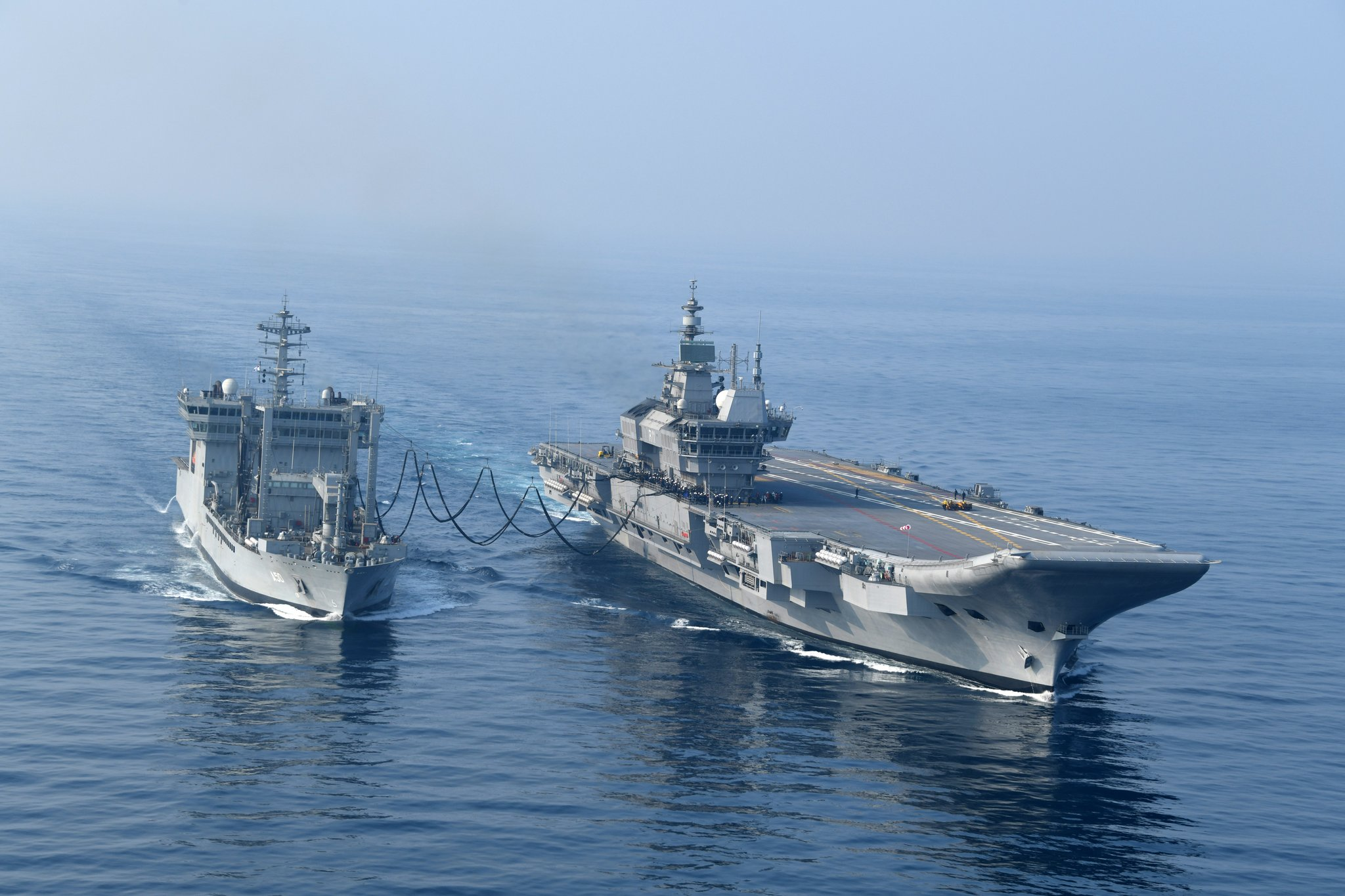
Vikrant undertaking a replenishment at sea with INS Deepak

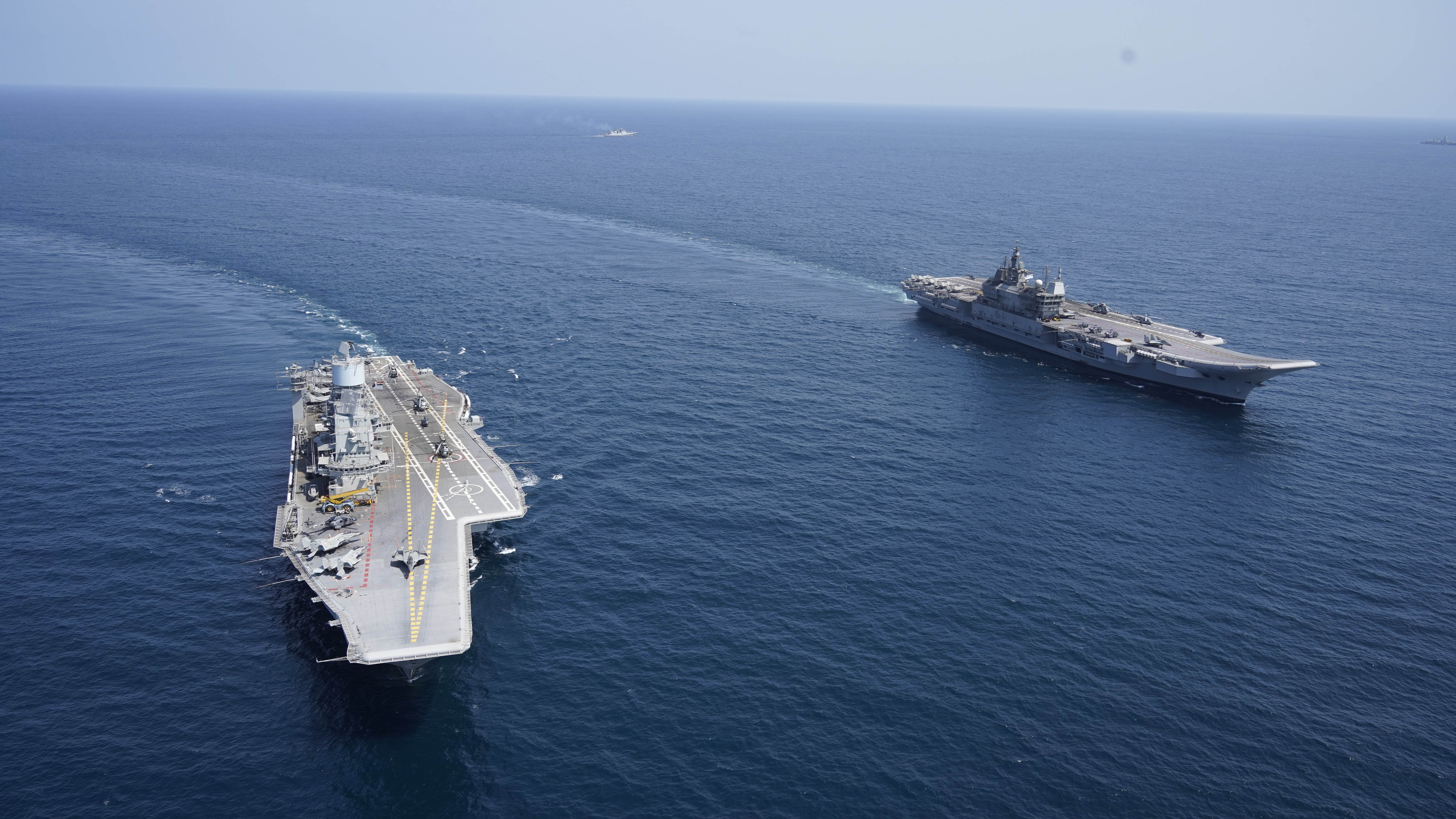
Vikrant performing manoeuvres with Vikramaditya

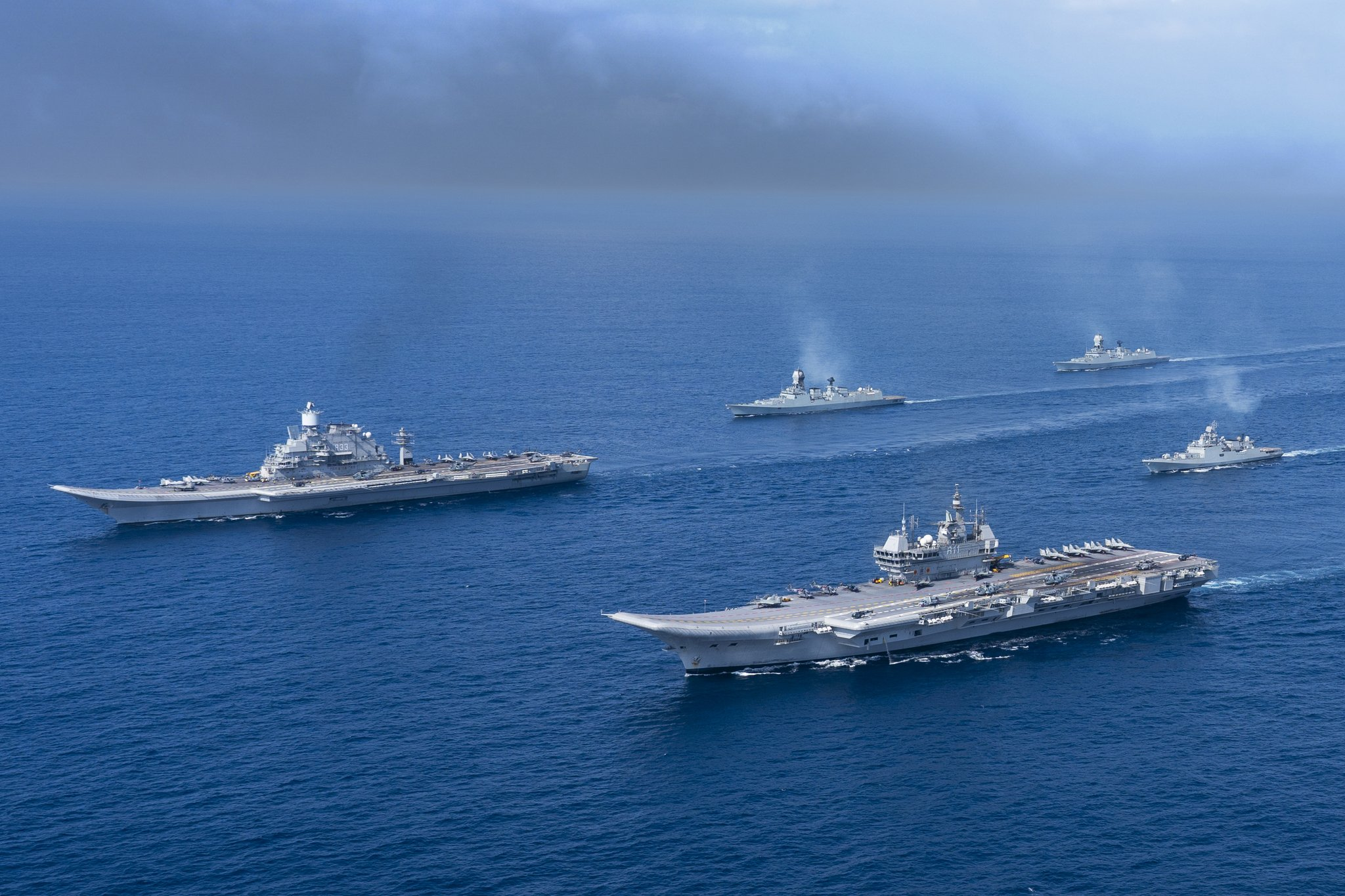
Vikrant and Vikramaditya with two Kolkata-class destroyer and a Talwar-class frigate

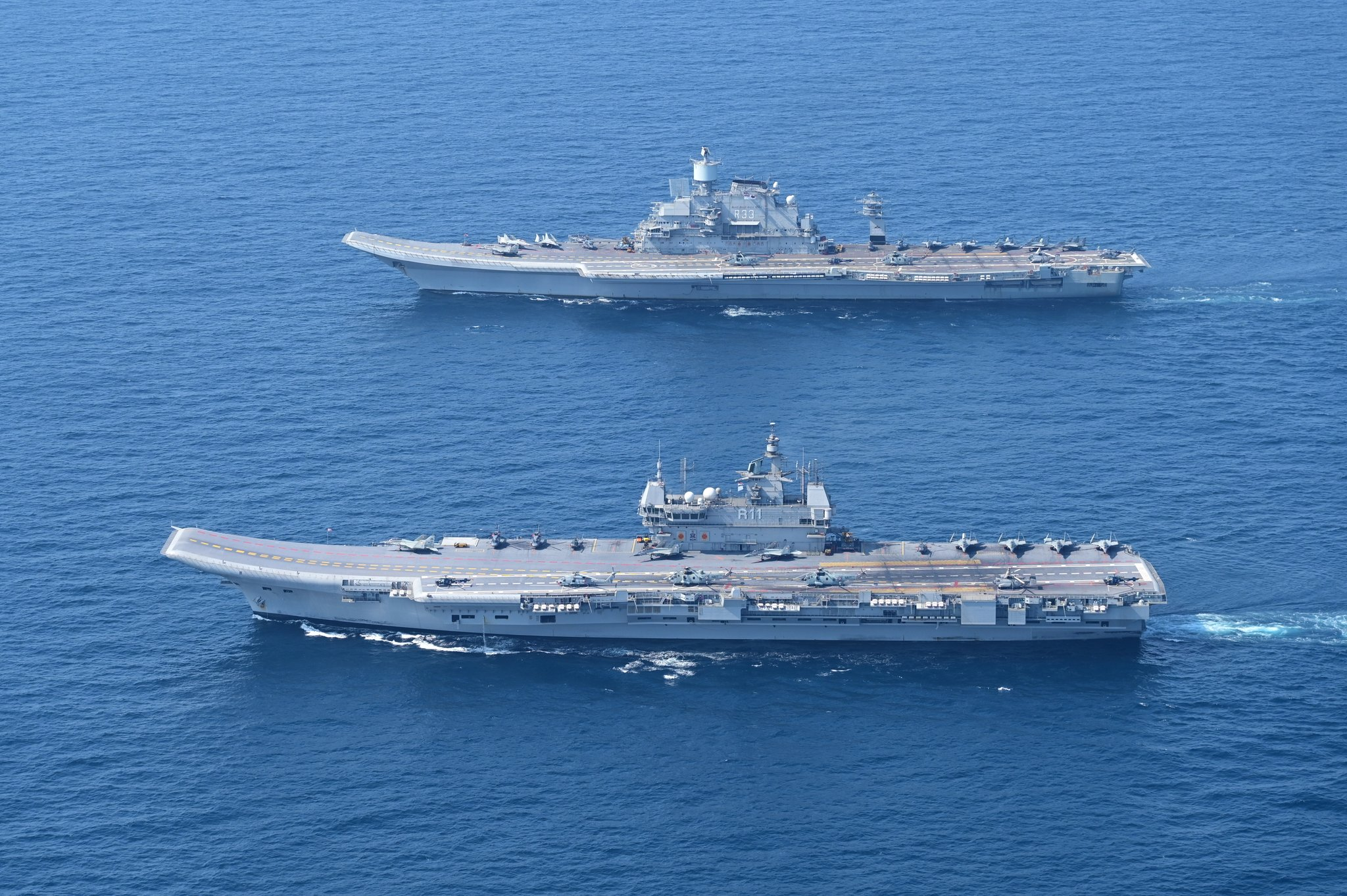
Vikrant with INS Vikramaditya undertaking joint carrier operations

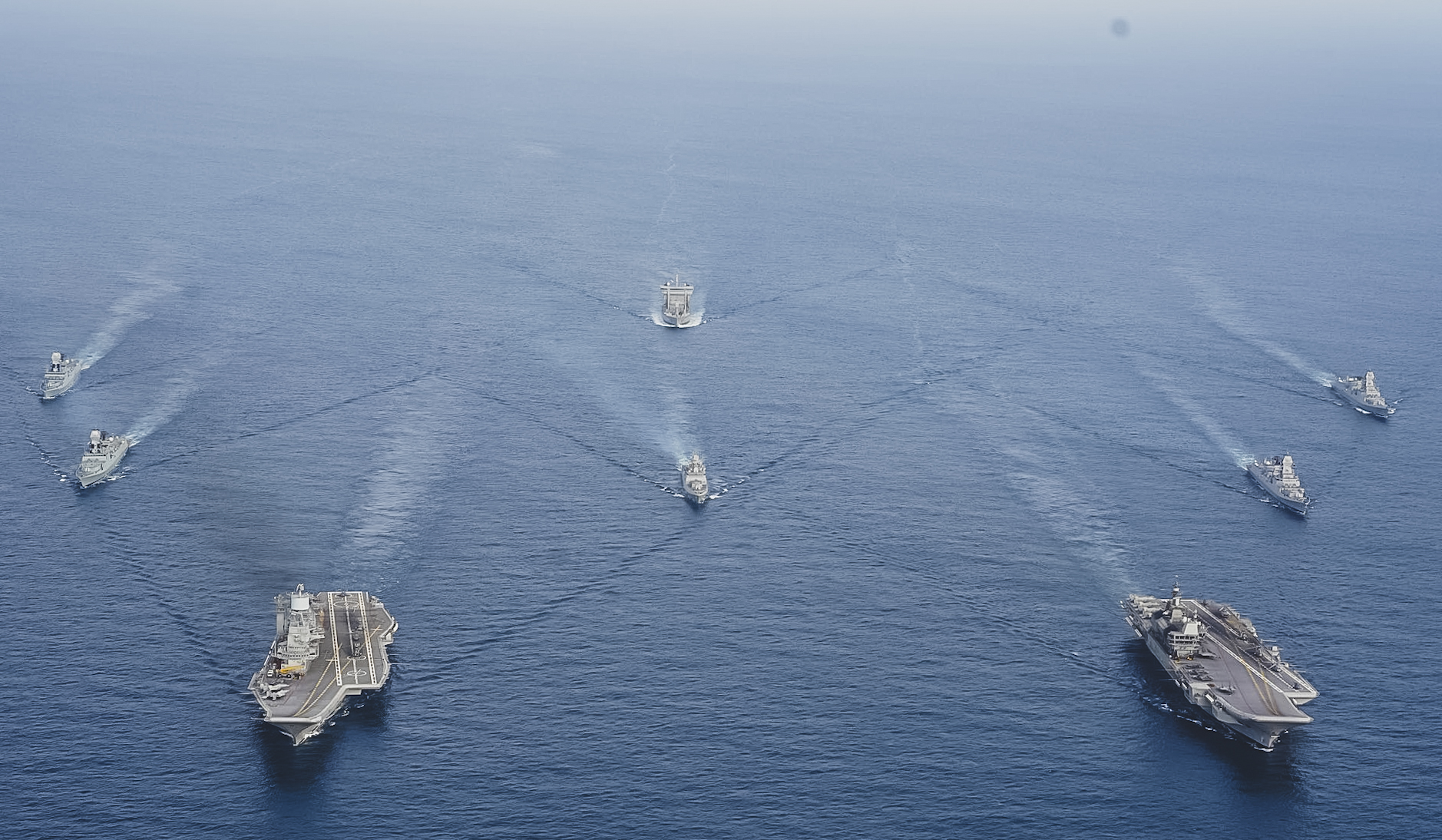
Vikrant and Vikramaditya during an exercise

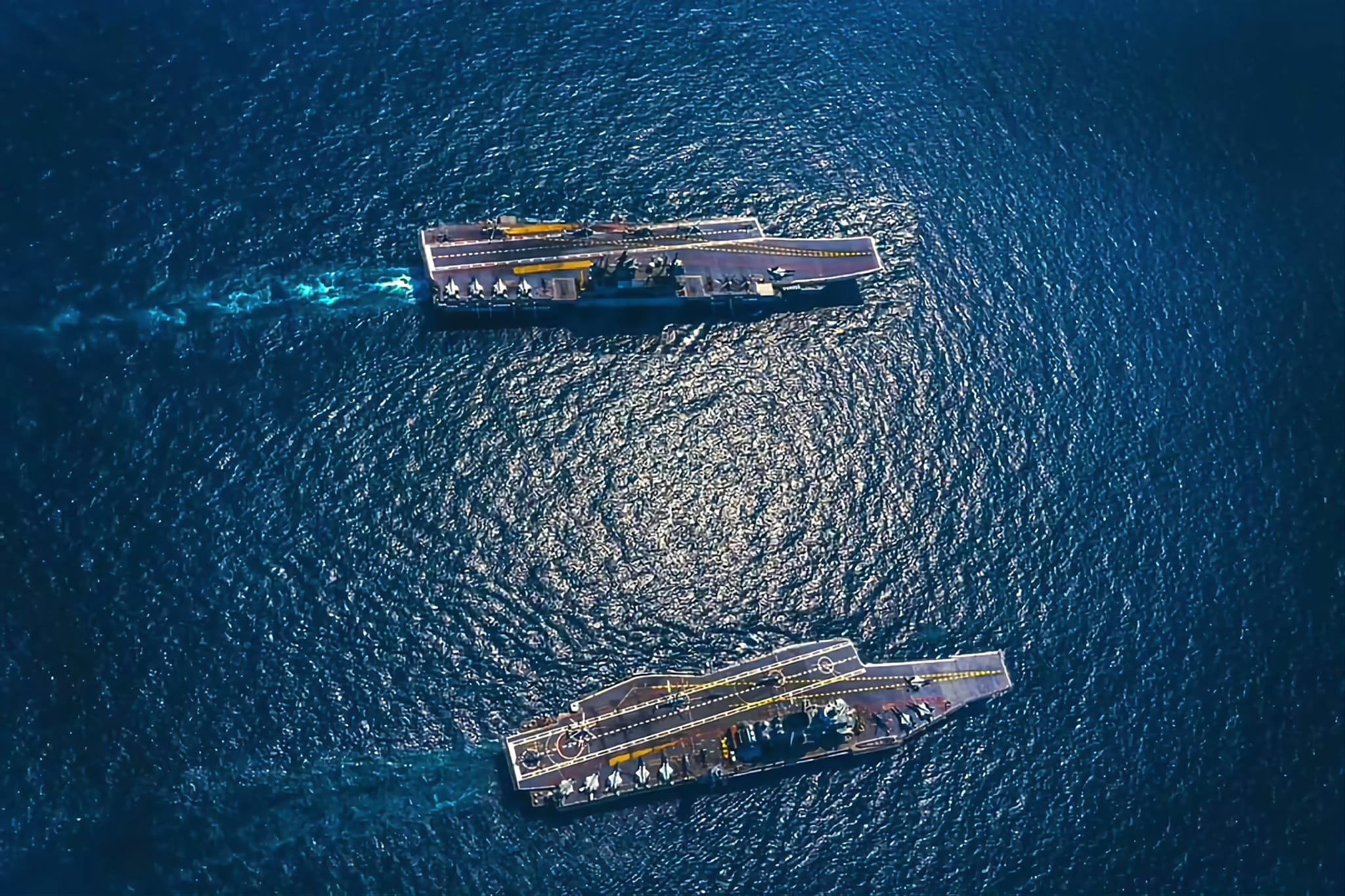
Two carrier formation

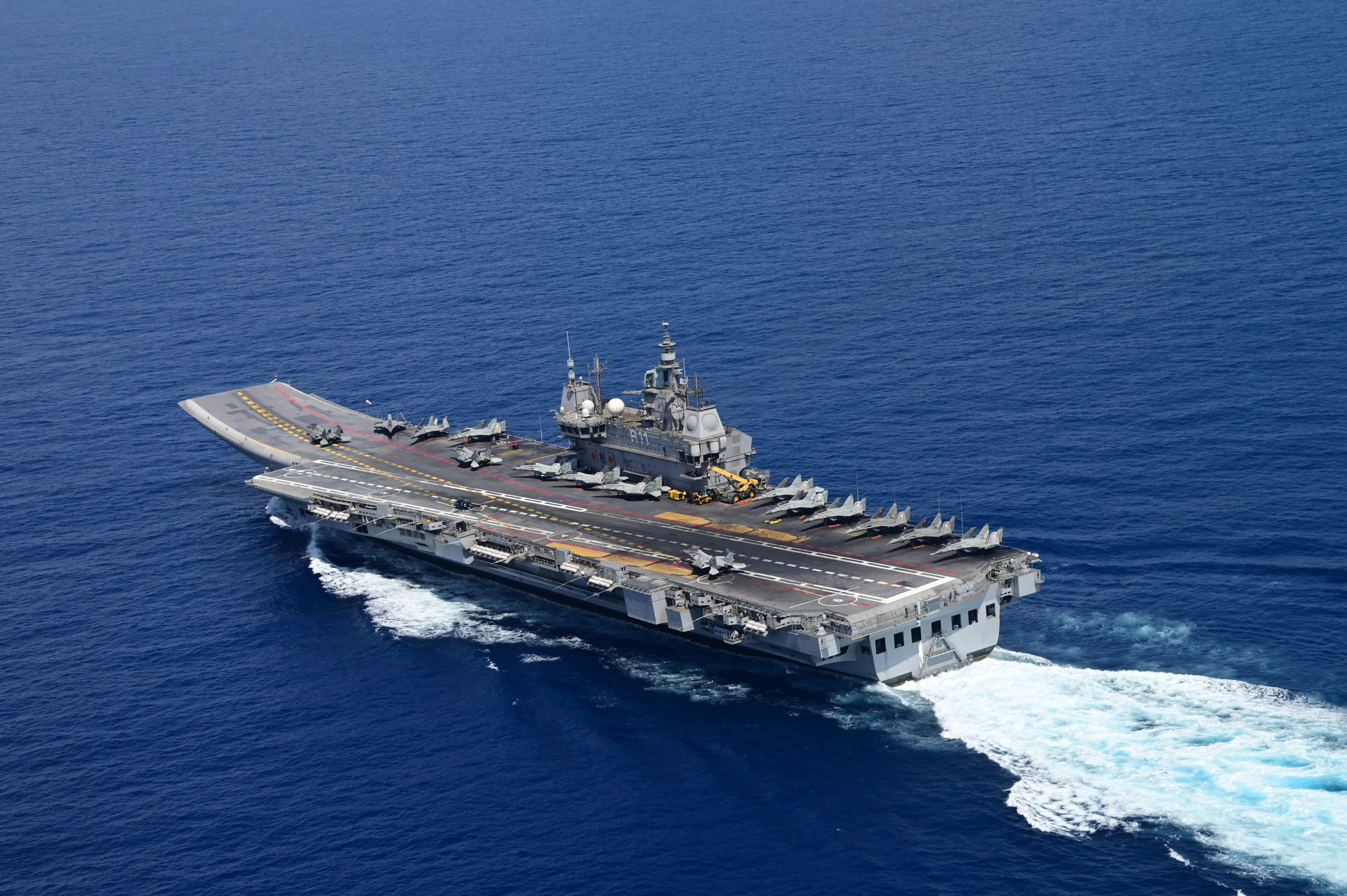
INS Vikrant with its embarked airwing.

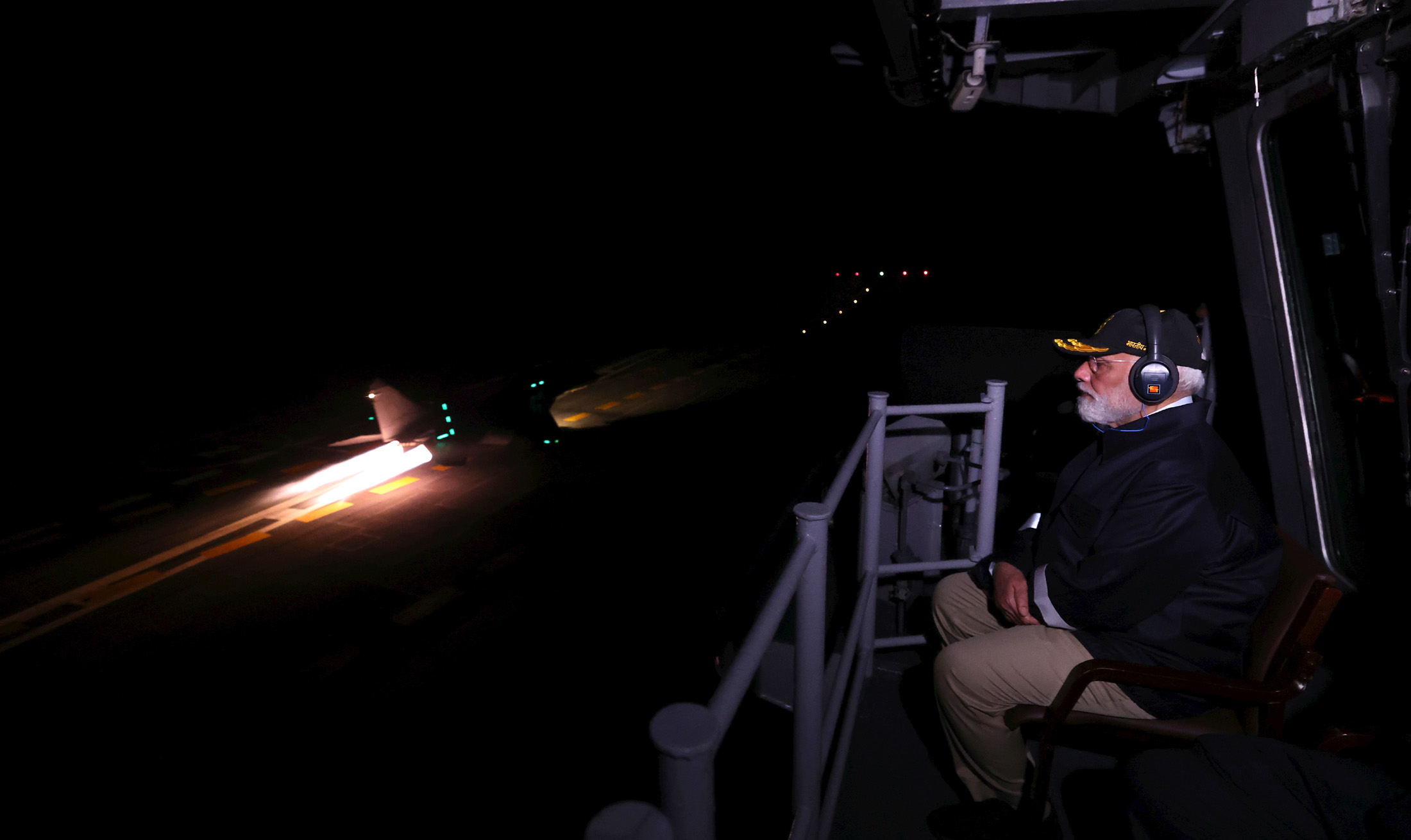
Night operations of a MiG-29K being witnessed by the Indian Prime Minister

== See also ==
- Future of the Indian Navy
- List of active Indian Navy ships
- List of aircraft carriers in service
- INS Vikramaditya
- INS Viraat
