= Elecon Engineering =

Indian conglomerate pvt ltd

Elecon Engineering Company Limited
- Type: Public
- Traded as: BSE: 505700; NSE: ELECON
- Industry: Materials Handling Equipment; Power Transmission; Power Generation; Foundry
- Founded: 1951; 75 years ago
- Founder: Ishwarbhai B. Patel
- Headquarters: Anand, Gujarat, India
- Area served: Worldwide
- Key people: Prayasvin B. Patel (chairman & MD)
- Products: Industrial gears; Material handling equipment; Mining equipment
- Revenue: ▲₹ 1,981.48 Crore (US$166.5 million) (2024)
- Net income: ▲₹ 355.58 Crore (US$42.46 million) (2024)
- Website: www.elecon.com

Elecon Engineering Company Limited is an Indian multinational company headquartered in Anand, Gujarat. The company specializes in the manufacturing of industrial gear and material handling equipment. Elecon is one of the largest Asian manufacturers of industrial gears and material handling equipment for core major sector like power, steel, cement, sugar, paper, mining, rubber and many more. Elecon group has subsidiaries such as Eimco Elecon Ltd, Elecon Hydraulics, Elecon Information Technology Ltd (EITL) and Tech Elecon Pvt. Ltd. (TEPL).

== History ==
Elecon Engineering was established in 1951 in Goregaon, Mumbai by Ishwarbhai B. Patel. The company's early focus was on engineering, procurement and construction projects in India and initially manufactured custom manufacturing conveyor systems. The company was then registered as a Private Limited company on 11 January 1960.

In May 1960, the company moved to its current location in Vallabh Vidyanagar, Gujarat (now part of Anand). Later, the company was listed on the Bombay Stock Exchange and the National Stock Exchange.

In 1976, the company established its Gear Division, specialising in power transmission equipment and industrial gears. It designs and manufactures Bucket-wheel excavator, worm drives, helical gears, planetary gears, couplings, Custom built gearboxes, loose gears and spiral bevel gears up to 1000 mm diameter. Its products target industries such as rubber, sugar, plastic, power, marine and mining industries etc.

In 2012, Elecon Engineering secured two prestigious orders from the NTPC and Tecpro Systems.

== Divisions ==
- Power Transmission, Elecon's Power Transmission product range includes Helical Gears, Worm Gears, Fluid, Geared & Flexible Couplings, Planetary Gearbox, Special Gears including Gear drive for seven roll stands in Tube Mill plant, Sheet metal un-coiler gearbox, Gear drive for piercing milling seamless tube plant, Assel mill gearbox in seamless tube plant, Drive for briquetting mill in continuous steel plant for hot strip mill, 330KW wind mill gear drive unit, Drive for sponge iron kiln, Marine gearbox for advanced offshore patrol vessel propulsion, among others.
- Materials Handling Equipment, Elecon's Materials Handling division manufactures Belt Conveyors, Idlers and Pulleys, Elevators and Chain Conveyors, Stackers, Reclaimers, Stacker-cum-Reclaimers, Barrel type Blender Reclaimers, Bridge type Bucket Wheel Reclaimer, Wagon Tipplers and Beetle Marshalling Equipment, Side Arm Chargers & Pusher Car, Ship loader and Unloaders, Crawler and Rail mounted Trippers, Wagon Loaders, Crawler mounted Bucket Wheel Excavator, Spreader, Mobile, Transfer Conveyors and other surface Mining Equipment, Specialized shiftable conveyors for open cast mines, Drive heads and long-distance conveyors, Salt Scraper and Scraper Reclaimer, Cable Reeling Drum, Apron Feeders, Paddle Feeders, Vibrating Feeders and Reciprocating Feeders, Roller Screen, Grizzly Feeders, Bin Vibrators, Impactors, Ring Granulators, Double/Single Roll Crushers, Hammer Mill Crushers, Rotary Breakers, Transfer Cars, Wind Turbine Generators.
- Foundry Division, Elecon's Foundry Division (EFD) provides casting and machining services to several other companies other than Elecon group.

== Acquisitions and subsidiaries ==
=== Acquisitions ===
In October 2010, Elecon acquired the Benzlers-Radicon Group, the power transmission division of UK-based David Brown Ltd.

=== Subsidiaries ===
- Radicon Transmission UK Limited
- Elecon Singapore pte.Limited
- Elecon Middle East FZE
- Benzler System AB -Sweden
- AB Banzlers -Sweden
- Radicon Drive System Inc. - US
- Banzlers Transmission A.S. - Denmark
- Benzlers Antriebstechnik G.m.b.h.
- Banzlers TBA B.V. -Netherlands
- OY banzlers AB-Finland

The Group of Companies

- Emtici Engineering
- Power Build Private Limited
- Vijay M. Mistry Construction Pvt. Ltd
- Modsonic Instruments Mfg. Co. (P) Ltd.
- Elecon Hydraulics

Associates

- Eimco Elecon (India) Ltd.
