= International Association for Computer Information Systems =

Nonprofit organization in the United States

The International Association for Computer Information Systems (IACIS), formerly the Society for Automation in Business Education, Society of Data Educators, and Association for Computer Educator, is a U.S.-based organization that is focused on increasing knowledge about all aspects of computer automation, including information systems, computer science, and applied education technology. It runs an annual conference, and presents a number of awards. It publishes two journals, Journal of Computer Information Systems (JCIS) and Issues in Information Systems (IIS).

== History ==
The Society for Automation in Business Education was formed in 1960, to promote the use of computers in the education of business students. In 1969 it was incorporated as the Society of Data Educators, and changed its name again to the Association for Computer Educators in 1987. In 1990 it adopted the name International Association for Computer Information Systems (IACIS).

== Description and governance ==
IACIS is a nonprofit association "dedicated to the improvement of information systems and the education of information systems and computer professionals".

The board of IACIS is headed by a president, as of February 2026 Kevin Floyd, who is associate dean at the School of Computing at Middle Georgia State University.

Former presidents include Susan Haugen-Behling (1951—2023), who was twice elected president of the organization, and also served as treasurer for 30 years.

== Conference ==
IACIS holds an annual conference each autumn, typically in Florida in October.

== Awards ==
IACIS awards a set of awards each year, which are presented at the annual conference. As of 2026 these include:

- Computer Educator of the Year Award
- Ben Bauman Award for Excellence
- Doctoral Research Award
- Best Paper Awards
- Past Student Award Recipients

== Journals ==
IACIS manages the production of two academic journals:

- Journal of Computer Information Systems (JCIS), published by Taylor & Francis six times a year
- Issues in Information Systems (IIS), published inhouse at IACIS four times a year
