= List of destroyer classes of the Indian Navy =

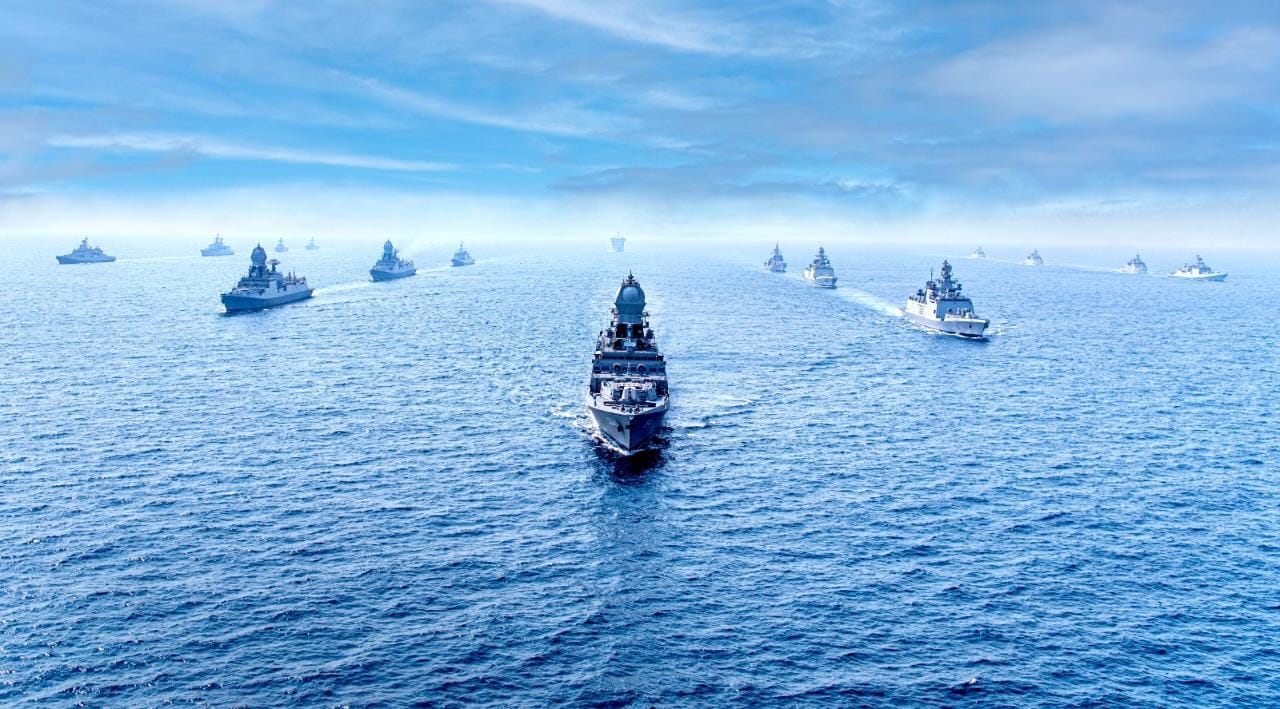
A flotilla led by destroyers of the Indian Navy during Exercise Tropex 2023

In naval terminology, a destroyer is a fast, manoueverable, long-distance warship intended to escort larger vessels in a fleet, convoy or battle group and defend them against smaller, short-range attackers. Seventeen destroyers have served, or currently serve, in the Indian Navy. The navy operates 13 guided-missile destroyers from four classes: Visakhapatnam class, Kolkata class, Delhi class, and Rajput class. Six other destroyers (three R class and three Hunt class) have been decommissioned and scrapped.

India did not have any destroyers of its own until 1949. The R-class INS Ranjit, built in the United Kingdom, was the first destroyer commissioned in the Indian Navy. Two more of the R-class were later commissioned. Three Hunt-class destroyers were commissioned in 1953 to succeed the R-class destroyers. These ships (all of which were built in the United Kingdom) were decommissioned by 1976, with the Hunt-class INS Godavari the last.

During the 1980s, India signed an agreement with the Soviet Union for five guided-missile destroyers, built as the Rajput class. The first ship -(INS Rajput - was commissioned on 30 September 1980. Four of the five Rajput-class are still in active service, Ranjit was decommissioned in 2019. The Rajput class was succeeded by the Delhi class, with INS Delhi, Mysore and Mumbai commissioned in 1997, 1999 and 2001 respectively. The Delhi-class destroyers, built in India, were succeeded by the Kolkata-class in 2014. The three Kolkata-class ships were commissioned in 2014–2016, with INS Chennai being the last. An improvement of the Kolkata-class, INS Visakhapatnam (part of the Visakhapatnam class), was commissioned in 2021. The second ship, INS Mormugao was commissioned in 2022, while the third ship INS Imphal (D68) in 2023 and the fourth ship INS Surat (D69) was commissioned in January 2025.

== Commissioned ships ==
Ten destroyers from three classes are in active service. INS Kolkata, the lead ship of the Kolkata-class destroyer with about 7,500 tonnes of displacement, is the largest. A total of three Kolkata-class ships are currently in service with the Indian Navy. The Kolkata-class destroyers were preceded by the Delhi-class destroyer which entered service with the 1997 of its lead ship, INS Delhi. The Delhi class were the first destroyers built in India. The Rajput-class destroyers, which preceded the Delhi class, consists of five ships built in the Soviet Union and were commissioned from 1980 to 1990.

=== Visakhapatnam-class ===
The Visakhapatnam class (Project 15B) is a class of stealth guided missile destroyers under construction. An improved version of the Kolkata class and ordered in 2011, the first Visakhapatnam-class ship is expected to be completed in 2018. The first vessel of this class is expected to get commissioned with INS Vikrant and INS Arighat. The class will have enhanced stealth characteristics and state-of-the-art weaponry and sensors, including the long-range Barak 8 surface-to-air missile. The first ship's keel was laid in October 2013. The Visakhapatnam class are armed with a 76 mm main gun and an AK-630 close-in anti-missile gun system.

Ship	Picture	Armament	VLS	Displacement	Service		Origin
Ship	Picture	Armament	VLS	Displacement	Laid down	Commissioned	Origin
Visakhapatnam		2 × 16-cell VLS for Barak 8 missiles (range 0.5 km (0.31 mi) to 100 km (62 mi)); 2 × 8-cell UVLM for 16 BrahMos anti-ship and land-attack cruise missiles; 76 mm Oto Melara SRGM gun; 4 × AK-630 CIWS; 4 × 533 mm torpedo tubes; 2 × RBU-6000 anti-submarine rocket launchers	48	7,500 tonnes	12 October 2013	21 November 2021	India
Mormugao		2 × 16-cell VLS for Barak 8 missiles (range 0.5 km (0.31 mi) to 100 km (62 mi)); 2 × 8-cell UVLM for 16 BrahMos anti-ship and land-attack cruise missiles; 76 mm Oto Melara SRGM gun; 4 × AK-630 CIWS; 4 × 533 mm torpedo tubes; 2 × RBU-6000 anti-submarine rocket launchers	48	7,500 tonnes	4 June 2015	18 December 2022	India
Imphal		2 × 16-cell VLS for Barak 8 missiles (range 0.5 km (0.31 mi) to 100 km (62 mi)); 2 × 8-cell UVLM for 16 BrahMos anti-ship and land-attack cruise missiles; 76 mm Oto Melara SRGM gun; 4 × AK-630 CIWS; 4 × 533 mm torpedo tubes; 2 × RBU-6000 anti-submarine rocket launchers	48	7,500 tonnes	19 May 2017	26 December 2023	India
Surat		2 × 16-cell VLS for Barak 8 missiles (range 0.5 km (0.31 mi) to 100 km (62 mi)); 2 × 8-cell UVLM for 16 BrahMos anti-ship and land-attack cruise missiles; 76 mm Oto Melara SRGM gun; 4 × AK-630 CIWS; 4 × 533 mm torpedo tubes; 2 × RBU-6000 anti-submarine rocket launchers	48	7,500 tonnes	19 July 2018	15 January 2025	India

=== Kolkata class ===
The Kolkata class (Project 15A) is a class of guided missile destroyers with stealth technology. By the year 2000, the Indian Navy had redesigned the follow-on Kolkata class to improve technology (including modern stealth characteristics) and in May of that year, approval for the construction was given. Concept and function for Project 15A was framed by the navy's Directorate of Naval Design, while the detailed design was developed by Mazagon Dock Limited (MDL). It consists of three ships (Kolkata, Kochi and Chennai), built by Mazagon Dock Limited, which are the navy's largest destroyers. Due to construction delays and a problem discovered during sea trials, the first ship's commission was postponed from 2010 to 2014.

Although the dimensions of Kolkata-class ships are similar to the previous Delhi class, their weaponry, sensors and helicopter systems have been upgraded. With a standard displacement of 6,800 t (6,700 long tons; 7,500 short tons) and a full-load displacement of 7,400 t (7,300 long tons; 8,200 short tons) (two sources reported a full-load displacement of 7,500 t (7,400 long tons; 8,300 short tons)), they are the navy's largest destroyers.

The ships' main air-defence armament is two 4 × 8-cell vertical launching systems (VLS) allowing up to 32 Barak 8 (medium- to long-range) missiles. Four AK-630 CIWS are fitted for near defence.

The Kolkata-class ships' primary offensive armament is supersonic BrahMos anti-ship and land-attack missiles. The BrahMos missiles are fitted into a 16-cell universal vertical launcher module (UVLM) allowing one missile per launch silo; all 16 missiles can be fired in salvo. A distinctive armament of the Kolkata class is its 76 mm (3.0 in) gun forward of the bridge. The 76 mm gun provides limited anti-shipping and anti-air capability in addition to naval gunfire support for land-based operations. For anti-submarine warfare, the class is equipped with a torpedo-launching system (with four torpedo tubes) and two RBU-6000 anti-submarine rocket launchers. Bharat Electronics Limited's electronic modular command and control applications (EMCCA) Mk4 provides combat management.

Ship	Picture	Armament	VLS	Displacement	Service		Origin
Ship	Picture	Armament	VLS	Displacement	Laid down	Commissioned	Origin
Kolkata		4 × 8-cell VLS for Barak 8 LR-SAM missiles; 2 × 8-cell UVLM for 16 BrahMos anti-ship and land-attack missiles; 76 mm Oto Melara SRGM gun; 4 × AK-630 CIWS; 2 × twin tube 533mm torpedo launchers; 2 × RBU-6000 anti-submarine rockets	48	7,400 tonnes	26 September 2003	16 August 2014	India
Kochi		4 × 8-cell VLS for Barak 8 LR-SAM missiles; 2 × 8-cell UVLM for 16 BrahMos anti-ship and land-attack missiles; 76 mm Oto Melara SRGM gun; 4 × AK-630 CIWS; 2 × twin tube 533mm torpedo launchers; 2 × RBU-6000 anti-submarine rockets	48	7,500 tonnes	25 October 2005	30 September 2015	India
Chennai		4 × 8-cell VLS for Barak 8 LR-SAM missiles; 2 × 8-cell UVLM for 16 BrahMos anti-ship and land-attack missiles; 76 mm Oto Melara SRGM gun; 4 × AK-630 CIWS; 2 × twin tube 533mm torpedo launchers; 2 × RBU-6000 anti-submarine rockets	48	7,500 tonnes	21 February 2006	21 November 2016	India

=== Delhi class ===
The Delhi-class vessels are the third-largest warships designed and built in India, after the Kolkata-class destroyers and the Shivalik-class frigates. They were built by Mazagon Dock Limited in Mumbai. Delhi-class design has Soviet and Western influences, incorporating elements of the Sovremenny, Rajput and Kashin-II-class destroyers and the Godavari-class frigate.

Delhi-class vessels are fitted with flag facilities, enabling them to act as command unit in task groups. The vessels are equipped to enable operation in a nuclear, biological and chemical warfare environment. For primary air defence, Delhi class is fitted with 9K-90 Uragan air-defence system comprising a pair of 3S-90 single-arm launchers and 9M38M1 Shtil missiles. One launcher is installed forward of the bridge and the other atop the dual helicopter hangar. Each launcher carries a 24 missile magazine for a total of 48 rounds. The Delhi class is being upgraded with the Rafael Barak 1 point air defence missile system. It has a pair of eight-cell vertical launch systems and missile command-to-line-of-sight (CLOS) radar guidance with a range of 10 km (6.2 mi).

The ships have a five 533 mm (21 in) torpedo tubes, which can be used to launch SET 65E active/passive homing torpedo and Type 53-65 wake homing torpedo, and is capable of hitting targets ranging from 15 km (9.3 mi) to 19 km (12 mi). They are equipped with two RBU-6000 anti-submarine rocket launchers with 12 tubes. They carry a 31 kg (68 lb) warhead and have a range of 6 km (3.7 mi).

Ship	Picture	Armament	VLS	Displacement	Service		Origin
Ship	Picture	Armament	VLS	Displacement	Laid down	Commissioned	Origin
Delhi		8 x Brahmos anti-ship and land-attack cruise missile; 32 × Barak 1 (2 × 16-cell) VLS missiles; 2 × Uragan SAM systems (48 9M38M1 Shtil missiles); 100 mm AK-100 gun; 2 × 30 mm AK-630 rotary cannons; 2 × RBU-6000 213 mm anti-submarine mortar arrays; Quintuple 533-millimetre (21 in) torpedo tubes	32	6,200 tonnes	14 November 1987	15 November 1997	India
Mysore		8 x Brahmos anti-ship and land-attack cruise missile; 32 × Barak 1 (2 × 16-cell) VLS missiles; 2 × Uragan SAM systems (48 9M38M1 Shtil missiles); 100 mm AK-100 gun; 2 × 30 mm AK-630 rotary cannons; 2 × RBU-6000 213 mm anti-submarine mortar arrays; Quintuple 533-millimetre (21 in) torpedo tubes	32	6,200 tonnes	2 February 1991	2 June 1999	India
Mumbai		8 x Brahmos anti-ship and land-attack cruise missile; 32 × Barak 1 (2 × 16-cell) VLS missiles; 2 × Uragan SAM systems (48 9M38M1 Shtil missiles); 100 mm AK-100 gun; 2 × 30 mm AK-630 rotary cannons; 2 × RBU-6000 213 mm anti-submarine mortar arrays; Quintuple 533-millimetre (21 in) torpedo tubes	32	6,200 tonnes	14 December 1992	22 January 2001	India

=== Rajput class ===
The Rajput-class guided-missile destroyers built for the Indian Navy (also known as Kashin-II class) are modified versions of Soviet Kashin-class destroyers. The ships were built in the former Soviet Union with Indian modifications to the Kashin design. These included the replacement of the helicopter pad in the original design with a flight elevator (to transports flights, aircraft, and helicopters, from hangar deck to flight deck, and changes to the electronics and combat systems. Five units were built for export to India during the 1980s.

The Rajput class inherited its anti-aircraft and anti-submarine warfare roles for aircraft carrier task-force defence against submarines, low-flying aircraft and cruise missiles from the Kashin class. They were the first ships in the Indian Navy to deploy the BrahMos supersonic cruise-missile systems, deployed during a mid-life refit of the ships. The missile system has four missiles in inclined, bow-mounted launchers (replacing two SS-N-2D Styx AShM launchers in INS Rajput) and an eight-cell VLS system replacing INS Ranvir and INS Ranvijay's aft S-125M (NATO: SA-N-1) SAM launchers. Ranvijay was deployed with an updated vertical launcher for the BrahMos missile. The Indian Navy is planning to upgrade the propulsion of Rajput-class ships with an indigenously developed Kaveri marine gas turbine (KMGT) engine. The Defence Research and Development Organisation Gas Turbine Research Establishment is developing this engine, which is currently being tested.

Ship	Picture	Armament	Displacement	Commissioned	Origin
Rana		4 × SS-N-2D Styx AShM missiles; 2 × S-125M (NATO: SA-N-1) SAM launchers; 76.2 mm main gun; 4 × 30 mm AK-230 CIWS; 16 × VL-SRSAM; 533 mm PTA quintuple torpedo tube launcher; 2 × RBU-6000 anti-submarine mortars	4,974 tonnes	28 June 1982	Soviet Union
Ranvir		8 × BrahMos aft VLS and 4 SS-N-2D Styx AShM missiles; S-125M (NATO: SA-N-1) SAM launcher; 2 × Barak SAM 8-cell launchers; 2 × 30 mm AK-630M CIWS; 533 mm PTA quintuple torpedo tube launcher; 2 × RBU-6000 anti-submarine mortars	4,974 tonnes	28 August 1986	Soviet Union
Ranvijay		8 × BrahMos aft VLS and 4 SS-N-2D Styx AShM missiles; S-125M (NATO: SA-N-1) SAM launcher; 2 × Barak SAM 8-cell launchers; 2 × 30 mm AK-630M CIWS; 533 mm PTA quintuple torpedo tube launcher; 2 × RBU-6000 anti-submarine mortars	4,974 tonnes	21 December 1987	Soviet Union

== Decommissioned ships ==
All presently decommissioned Indian Navy destroyers were built in the United Kingdom and Soviet Union. The R-class INS Ranjit was the first destroyer commissioned by the navy; two more R-class ships were later commissioned. Three Hunt-class destroyers were commissioned in 1953 to succeed the R-class destroyers. The R-class INS Rana was decommissioned on 30 June 1973, the first decommissioned destroyer. It was followed by INS Rajput in 1973, INS Ranjit, INS Gomati and INS Ganga in 1975 and INS Godavari in 1976. All the British-built ships were decommissioned by 1976. INS Ranjit became the first ship from the Rajput-class to be decommissioned. The ship was decommissioned on 6 May 2019.

=== Rajput class ===
The Rajput-class guided-missile destroyers built for the Indian Navy (also known as Kashin-II class) are modified versions of Soviet Kashin-class destroyers. The ships were built in the former Soviet Union with Indian modifications to the Kashin design. These included the replacement of the helicopter pad in the original design with a flight elevator (to transports flights, aircraft, and helicopters, from hangar deck to flight deck, and changes to the electronics and combat systems. Five units were built for export to India during the 1980s.

Ship	Picture	Armament	Displacement	Commissioned	Decommissioned	Origin	Fate
INS Ranjit (D53)		4 × SS-N-2D Styx AShM missiles; 2 × S-125M (NATO: SA-N-1) SAM launchers; 76.2 mm main gun; 4 × 30 mm AK-630M CIWS; 533 mm PTA quintuple torpedo tube launcher; 2 × RBU-6000 anti-submarine mortars	4,974 tonnes	24 September 1983	6 May 2019	Soviet Union	Decommissioned
INS Rajput (D51)		4 × BrahMos supersonic missiles and 2 SS-N-2D Styx AShM missiles; Dhanush ballistic missile; 2 × S-125M (NATO: SA-N-1) SAM launchers; 76.2 mm main gun; 4 × 30 mm AK-230 CIWS; 533 mm PTA quintuple torpedo tube launcher; 2 × RBU-6000 anti-submarine mortars	4,974 tonnes	4 May 1980	21 May 2021	Soviet Union	Decommissioned

=== R class ===
The R class was a class of sixteen War Emergency Programme destroyers ordered for the Royal Navy in 1940 as the 3rd and 4th Emergency Flotilla. The Q and R class repeated the preceding O and P class, reverting to the larger J, K and N-class hull to allow for increased top weight (maximum permissible weight). Since they had fewer main guns than the J, K and Ns, magazine space was replaced by fuel bunkers allowing for 4,675 nautical miles (8,658 km) at 20 knots (37 km/h). This compared with the 3,700 nmi (6,900 km) of the preceding classes. Like the O and P classes, they were armed with available weapons: 4.7-inch (120 mm) guns on single mountings allowing only 40° of elevation. As a result, on paper they do not compare favourably with many of their contemporaries. These ships used the Fuze Keeping Clock HA Fire Control Computer. The R class repeated the Qs, except that the officers' accommodation was moved from the traditional right aft to a more accessible location amidships.

Ship	Picture	Armament	Displacement	Service				Origin	Fate
Ship	Picture	Armament	Displacement	Laid down	Commissioned (Royal Navy)	Commissioned (Indian Navy)	Decommissioned	Origin	Fate
INS Rajput (D141) Formerly HMS Rotherham (H09)		4 × QF 4.7-inch (120-mm) Mk.IX guns, single-mount CP Mk.XVIII; 4 × QF 2-pdr Mk.VIII (40 mm L39), quad-mount Mk.VII; 6 × QF 20 mm Oerlikon, single-mount P Mk.III; 8 × 2 × 4 tubes for 21-inch (530 mm) torpedoes Mk.IX; Up to 3 throwers & racks for 45 depth charges	2,449 tonnes	10 April 1941	August 1942	27 July 1949	1976	United Kingdom	scrapped
INS Ranjit Formerly HMS Redoubt (H41)		4 × QF 4.7-inch (120-mm) Mk.IX guns, single-mount CP Mk.XVIII; 4 × QF 2-pdr Mk.VIII (40 mm L39), quad-mount Mk.VII; 6 × QF 20 mm Oerlikon, single-mount P Mk.III; 8 × 2 × 4 tubes for 21-inch (530 mm) torpedoes Mk.IX; Up to 3 throwers & racks for 45 depth charges	2,449 tonnes	19 June 1941	1 October 1942	1949	1979	United Kingdom	scrapped
INS Rana (D115) Formerly HMS Raider (H15)		4 × QF 4.7-inch (120-mm) Mk.IX guns, single-mount CP Mk.XVIII; 4 × QF 2-pdr Mk.VIII (40 mm L39), quad-mount Mk.VII; 6 × QF 20 mm Oerlikon, single-mount P Mk.III; 8 × 2 × 4 tubes for 21-inch (530 mm) torpedoes Mk.IX; Up to 3 throwers & racks for 45 depth charges	2,449 tonnes	1941	16 November 1942	1949	1976	United Kingdom	scrapped

=== Hunt class ===
The Hunt class was a class of Royal Navy escort destroyer. The first ships were ordered early in 1939 and the class saw extensive service in World War II, particularly on the British east coast and in Mediterranean convoys. The Hunts were modelled on the 1938 escort sloop Bittern. The Hunt class had three twin QF 4-inch (102 mm) Mark XVI gun with a quadruple QF 2-pounder-mount Mark VII on a hull of the same length, but with 8 feet (2 m) less beam and installed power raised to 19,000 shp (14,000 kW) to give 27 knots (50 km/h). The first twenty were ordered in March and April 1939. They were constructed to Admiralty standards (like contemporary destroyers), unlike frigates which followed mercantile practice.

Ship	Picture	Armament	Displacement	Service				Fate
Ship	Picture	Armament	Displacement	Laid down	Commissioned (Royal Navy)	Commissioned (Indian Navy)	Decommissioned	Fate
INS Godavari (D92) (Formerly HMS Bedale)		6 × 102 mm QF 4 inch Mk XVI naval guns (3 twin turrets); 4 × 40 mm QF 2-pdr; 2–4 × 20 mm antiaircraft cannons; 2 depth charge launchers; 4 depth charge throwers	1,450 tonnes	25 May 1940	27 July 1946	27 April 1953	1976	damaged beyond repair 1976. scrapped 1979
INS Gomati (D93) Formerly HMS Lamerton (L88)		6 × QF 4 in Mark XVI guns on twin mounts Mk. XIX; 4 × QF 2-pdr Mk. VIII on quad mount MK.VII; 2 × (later 4) 20 mm Oerlikons on single mounts P Mk. III; 110 depth charges, 2 throwers, 3 racks	1,450 tonnes	10 April 1940	16 August 1941	24 April 1953	1975	struck from active in 1975 scrapped
INS Ganga (D94) (Note: Formerly HMS Chiddingfold (L31).)		6 × QF 4 in Mark XVI guns on twin mounts Mk. XIX; 4 × QF 2-pdr Mk. VIII on quad mount MK.VII; 2 × (later 4) 20 mm Oerlikons on single mounts P Mk. III; 110 depth charges, 2 throwers, 3 racks	1,450 tonnes	1 March 1940	October 1941	18 June 1953	1975	struck from active in 1975. scrapped

== Future ships ==
=== Project 18-class ===
The Project 18 class is a class of stealth guided missile destroyers. The class will include 8-10 Project 18 class destroyers, as a follow-on of Visakhapatnam class. It will include 144-cell VLS missile launchers in its arsenal.

== See also ==
- List of active Indian Navy ships
- Future of the Indian Navy
- List of ships of the Indian Navy
- List of submarines of the Indian Navy
- List of frigates of the Indian Navy

== Notes ==
Footnotes

Citations
