= INS Surat =

Visakhapatnam-class destroyer of the Indian Navy

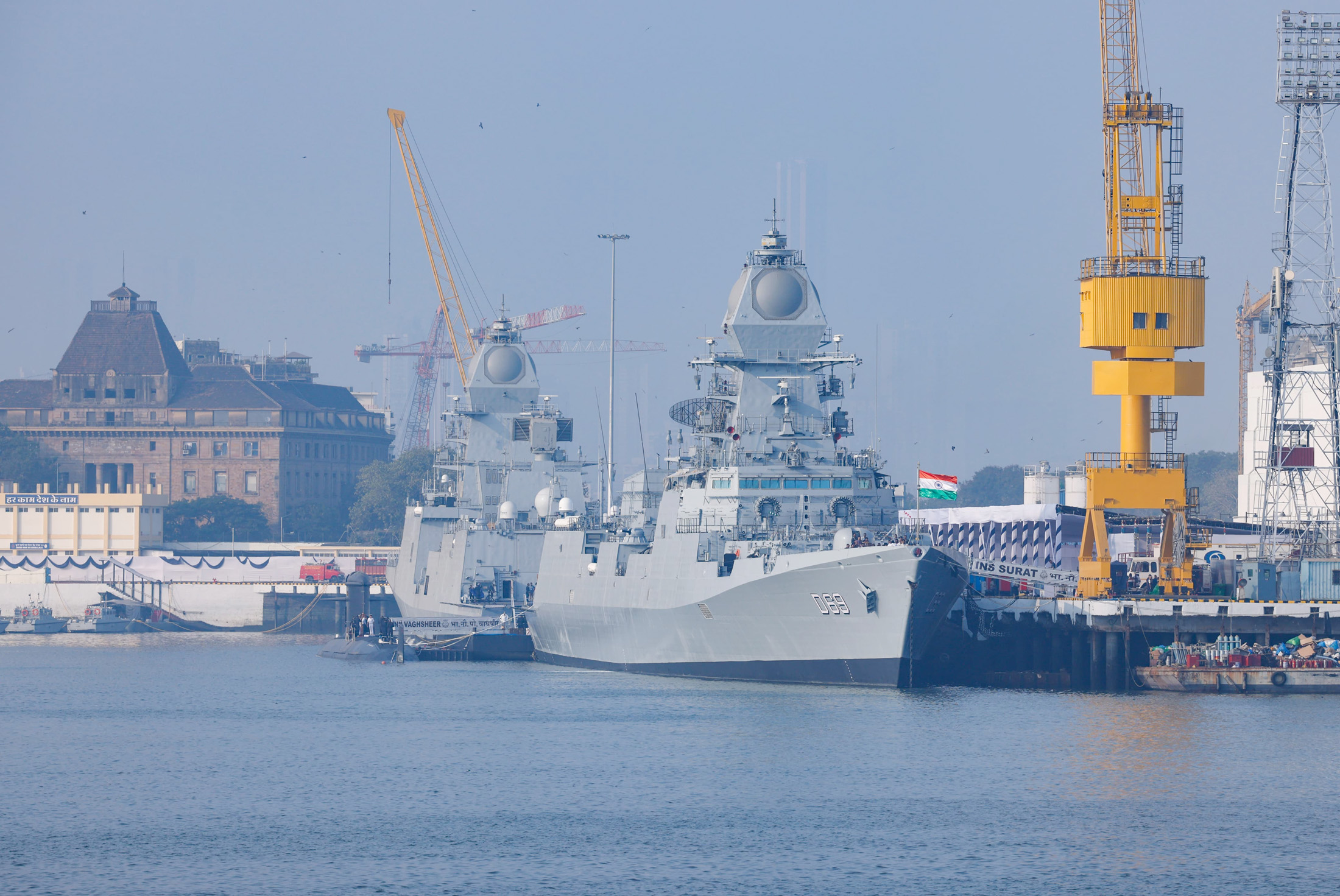
- INS Surat

History

India
- Name: Surat
- Namesake: Surat
- Operator: Indian Navy
- Builder: Mazagon Dock Limited
- Laid down: 7 November 2019
- Launched: 17 May 2022
- Completed: 15 June 2024
- Commissioned: 15 January 2025
- Identification: Pennant number: D69
- Motto: सागरे प्रचंड। "Fierce in the ocean" or "Mighty in the sea."
- Status: In active service
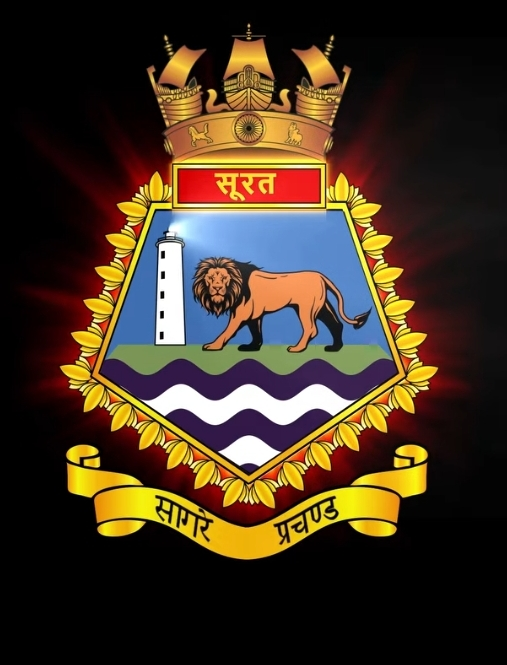
- Badge

General characteristics
- Type: Guided missile destroyer
- Displacement: 7,400 t (7,300 long tons; 8,200 short tons)
- Length: 163 m (535 ft)
- Beam: 17.4 m (57 ft)
- Draft: 6.5 m (21 ft)
- Propulsion: COGAG; 2 x Zorya M36E gas turbines, with 4 × DT-59 reversible gas turbines and 2 × RG-54 gearboxes; 2 × Bergen/GRSE KVM-diesel engines, 9,900 hp (7,400 kW) each; 4 × 1 MWe Wärtsilä WCM-1000 generator sets driving Cummins KTA50G3 engines and Kirloskar 1 MV AC generators
- Speed: In excess of 30 knots (56 km/h)
- Range: 8,000 nautical miles (15,000 km; 9,200 mi) at 18 knots (33 km/h; 21 mph)
- Endurance: 45 days
- Boats & landing craft carried: 4 x RHIB
- Crew: 300 (50 officers + 250 sailors)
- Sensors & processing systems: Radar :-; IAI EL/M-2248 MF-STAR S-Band AESA radar; BEL RAWL-02/LW-08 L-Band air-search radar; Terma/Tata Scanter-6002 X-Band surface-search radar; Sonar :-; BEL HUMSA-NG active/passive sonar; BEL "Nagin" active towed-array sonar; Combat Suite :-; "Combat Management System" (CMS)
- Electronic warfare & decoys: DRDO "Shakti" EW suite (equipped with ESM/ECM and "Radar Finger Printing System" (RFPS)); DRDO "Nayan" COMINT suite; Decoys :-; 4 x Kavach decoy launchers; 2 x Maareech torpedo-countermeasure systems
- Armament: Anti-air warfare :-; 4 × 8-cell VLS, for a total of 32 Barak 8 surface-to-air missiles; Anti-surface warfare :-; 2 x 8-cell VLS, for 16 BrahMos anti-ship missiles; Anti-submarine warfare :-; 4 × 533 mm (21 in) torpedo tubes; 2 × RBU-6000 anti-submarine rocket launchers; Guns :-; 1 × OTO Melara 76 mm naval gun; 4 x AK-630M CIWS; 2 x OFT 12.7 mm M2 Stabilized Remote Controlled Gun
- Aircraft carried: 2 × HAL Dhruv (or) Sea King Mk. 42B
- Aviation facilities: Enclosed helicopter hangar and flight deck capable of accommodating two multi-role helicopters.
- Notes: Modified derivative of the Kolkata-class destroyer.

INS Surat is the fourth ship of the Visakhapatnam-class stealth guided-missile destroyers of the Indian Navy. The ship is the last of the line of destroyers built under Project 15 which includes the Delhi-class (P-15), the Kolkata-class (P-15A) and the Visakhapatnam-class destroyer (P-15B). The commissioning commanding officer of Surat is Captain Sandeep Shourie.

Initially, the ship was speculated to be named after port city Porbandar but later it was changed to Surat. The other warships of this class are INS Visakhapatnam, INS Mormugao, INS Imphal. The ship has the distinction of being the first Artificial Intelligence-enabled warship of the Indian Navy.

== Construction ==
The keel of Surat was laid down in 2018. Built at two different geographical locations using the block construction methodology involving hull construction and joining at MDL. As the successor of P-15A destroyers, the P-15B destroyers are the next generation of stealth guided missile destroyers to be used by the Indian Navy.

The keel for Surat was laid on 9 November 2019 and was launched on 17 May 2022 by Mazagon Dock Limited. On 15 June 2024, Surat begun her Contractor Sea Trials and completed her Final Machinery Trials on 25 November 2024 taking a time of record low of 6 months. The ship was delivered to the Indian Navy on 20 December 2024. The ship was delivered within 31 months from launch which made this the fastest destroyer to be built in India. The ship was initially scheduled to be commissioned in December 2024 but the timeline was later shifted.

== Service history ==
The ship was commissioned on 15 January 2025 along with INS Nilgiri and INS Vagsheer.

On 24 April 2025, INS Surat conducted a missile test of MRSAM which intercepted a sea-skimming target in the Arabian Sea through precision cooperative engagement.

The ship arrived at Hazira Port near Surat on the occasion of Gujarat Day on 1 May 2025. Surat was involved in the rescue operations of a container vessel that had caught fire off the coast of Beypore along with the Indian Coast Guard In early June 2025. The ship later took the 18 crew members injured in the fire to Mangalore on June 9.

On 28 August 2025, Surat arrived in Jeddah Port of Saudi Arabia a day after INS Tamal.

On 28 August 2025, INS Surat undertook her maiden overseas port call at Jeddah Port of Saudi Arabia, a day after INS Tamal called at the same port, i.e., on 27 August. The ships' crew will also interact with the Royal Saudi Navy and Border Guards as part of a goodwill visit along with diplomatic talks, sports fixture and exploring "avenues for further engagement". On 7 September 2025, Surat participated in a Passage Exercise (PASSEX) with ITS Caio Duilio (D554).

=== Exercise Konkan 2025 ===
INS Vikrant (R11) and its Carrier Battle Group (CBG), including Surat, took part in the biennial Exercise Konkan 2025 with the Royal Navy's UK Carrier Strike Group 2025 (UK CSG 25), a formation centred on HMS Prince of Wales (R09), between 5 and 12 October 2025 off the Western Coast of India. This is the maiden instance of a dual carrier operation between the countries. While the UK CSG included HMS Richmond (F239) and RFA Tidespring (A136) along with HNoMS Roald Amundsen (F311) of the Royal Norwegian Navy and JS Akebono (DD-108) of the Japan Maritime Self-Defense Force, the Indian Navy's CBG included INS Kolkata (D63), INS Mormugao (D67), INS Tabar (F44), INS Teg (F45) and INS Deepak (A50). The 2021 edition, named Konkan Shakti, was the largest exercise in the series in which all three services of both countries participated. On 8 October, the Indian Air Force deployed its Su-30MKI and Jaguar aircraft for a one-day exercise with the group.

=== 2026 ===
On 16 February, INS Surat made a port visit to Bahrain, on the bylines of International Fleet Review 2026. She hosted a Staff Enhancement Training of the Combined Task Force (CTF) 154 for 23 participants on 10 nations.

Amid the Iran War, the destroyer and an Indian Navy frigate was kept deployed in the Gulf of Oman and the Gulf of Aden under Operation Sankalp. As on 2 March, India was "closely monitoring" the situation and the warships could be immediately diverted for HADR operations, as per a senior defence official. A day earlier the Prime Minister-chaired Cabinet Committee on Security, the country's highest decision-making body on security and strategic affairs, had convened a meeting to review the West Asia conflict and its implications for India. During the subsequent Operation Urja Suraksha, INS Surat rescued six Pakistani fishermen on 15th March who were stranded 170 nautical miles east of Oman’s Port of Duqm after their fishing vessel Islami had a fire accident.

On 8 July 2026, Surat conducted joint naval activities with JS Takanami of the Japan Maritime Self-Defense Force (JMSDF) after the latter completed an operational turnaround during a port call in Mumbai on 5 July. The Japanese ship is on an operational deployment in the Western Indian Ocean.

== Ship badge ==
On 6 November 2023, Chief Minister of Gujarat, Bhupendra Patel, unveiled the crest of the ship in Surat. The crest depicts the lighthouse at Hazira of Surat which is situated at the southern entrance of the Gulf of Khambhat and was built in 1836 as one of the first lighthouses in India. The state animal of Gujarat, the Asiatic Lion is also depicted in the crest of the ship.

== Gallery ==
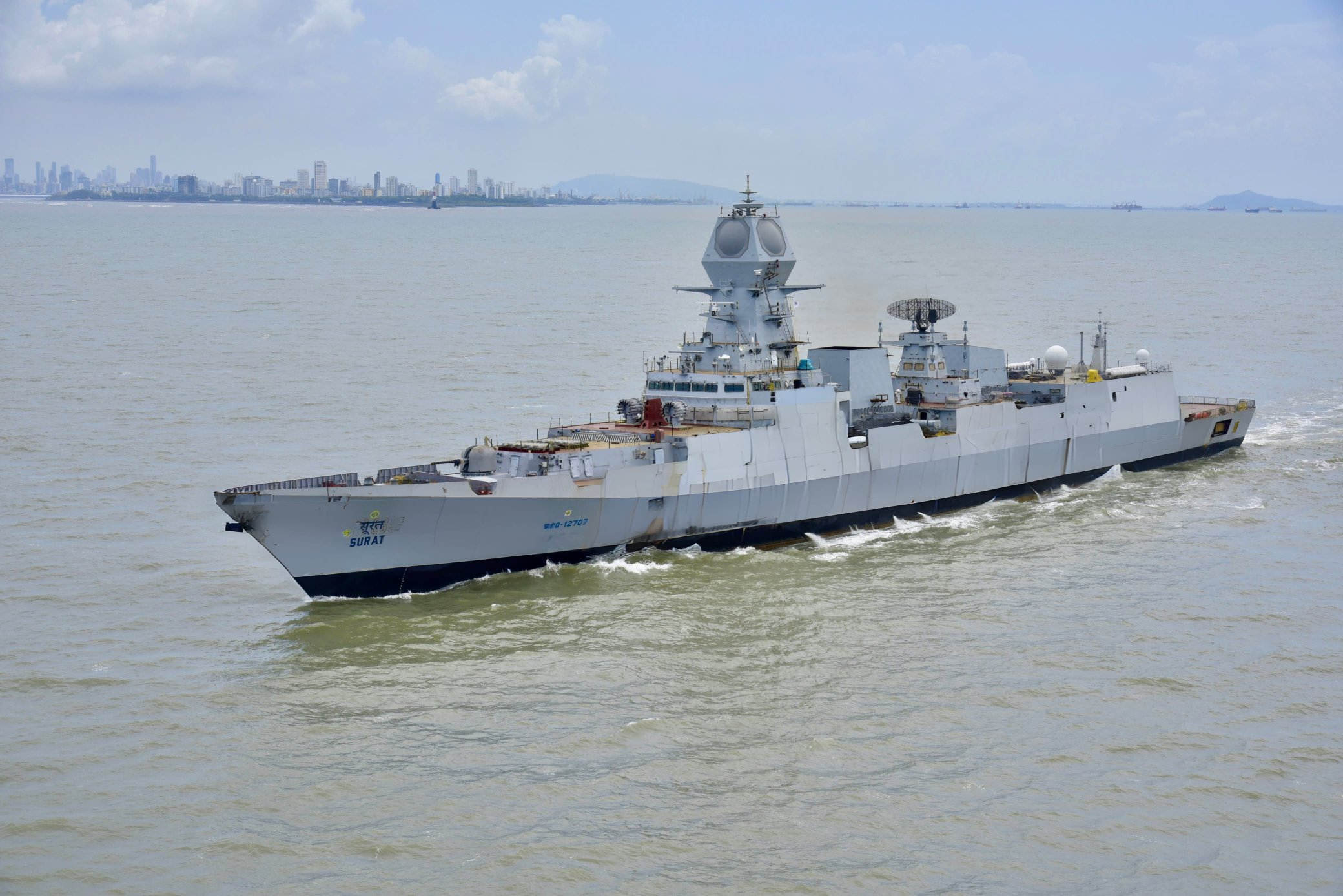
Surat during sea trials

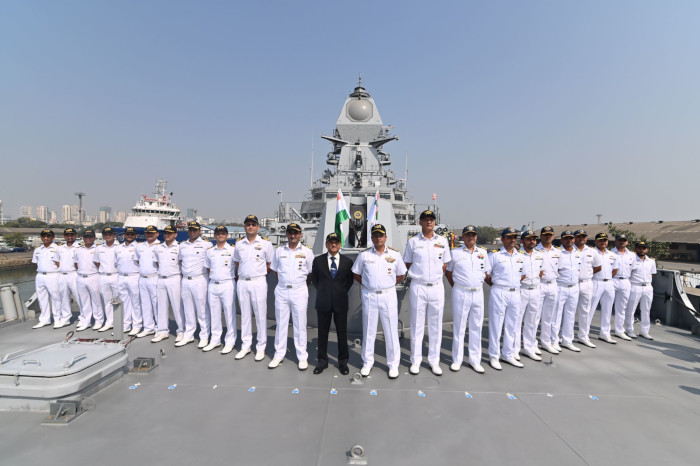
Delivery ceremony of the ship at Mazagon Dock Shipbuilders

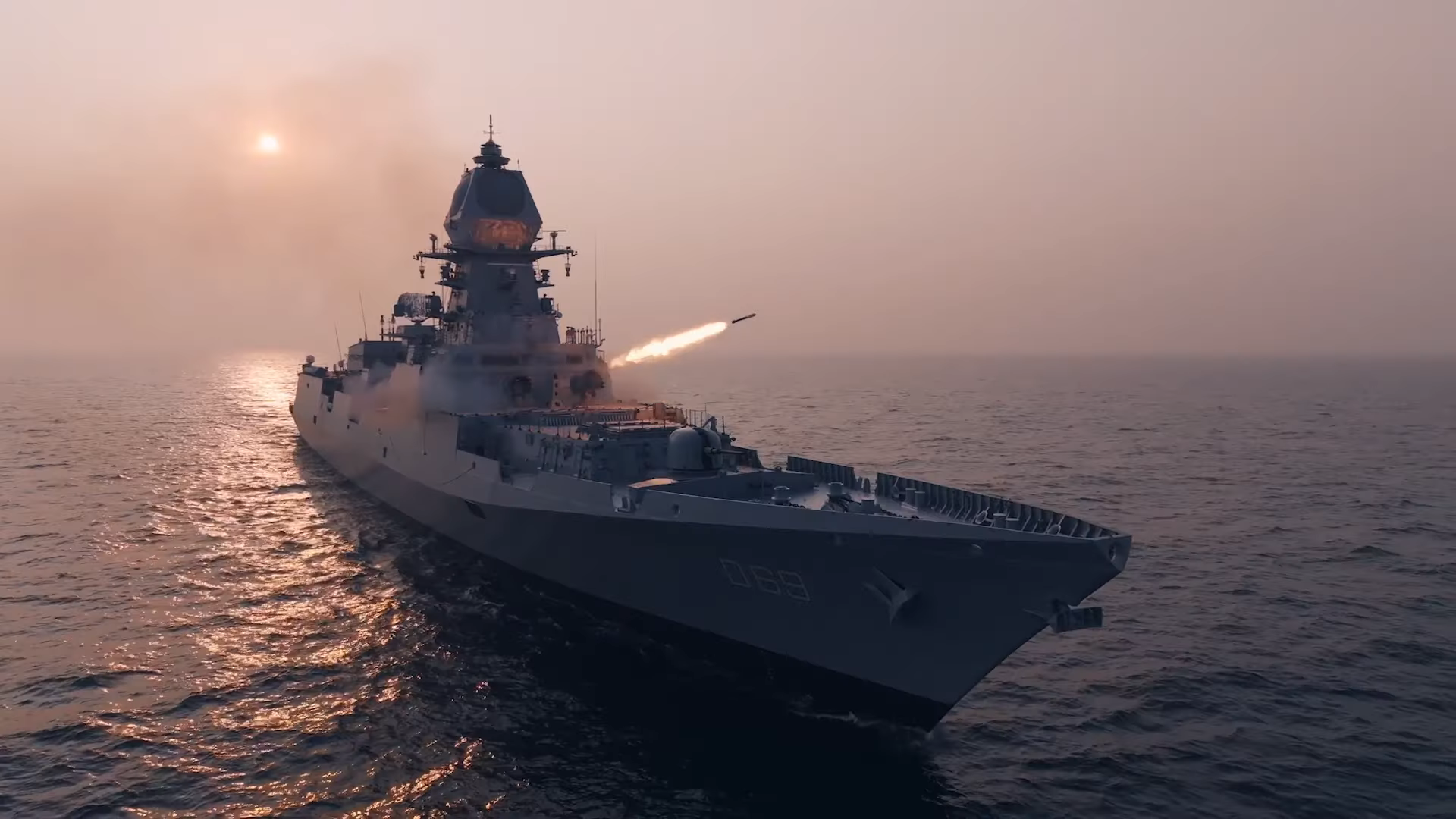
INS Surat firing one of its RBU-6000 rockets

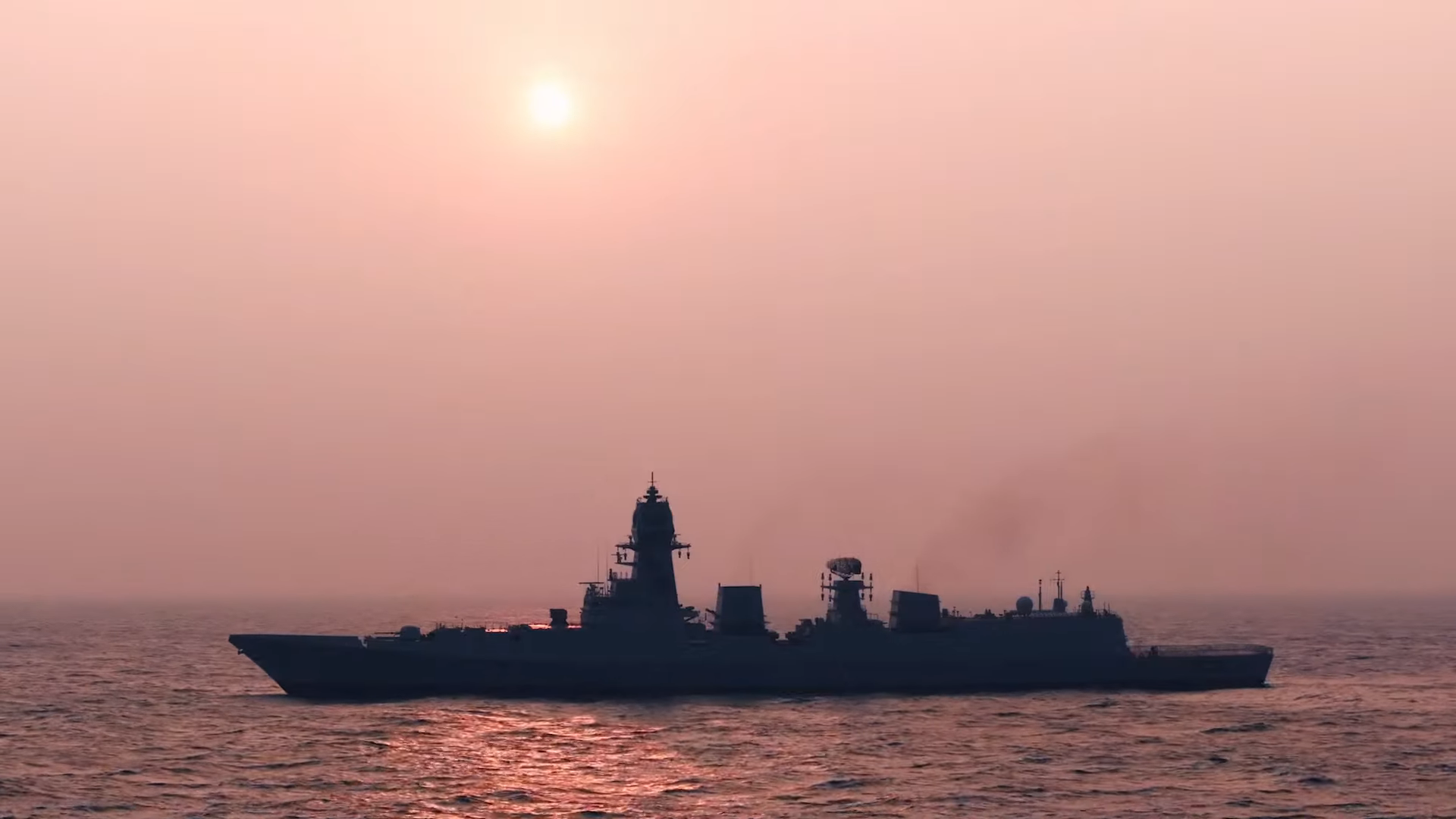
INS Surat silhouette

== See also ==
- Delhi-class destroyer
- List of active Indian Navy ships
- List of destroyers of India
- Future of the Indian Navy
