= INS Imphal =

Indian Naval destroyer

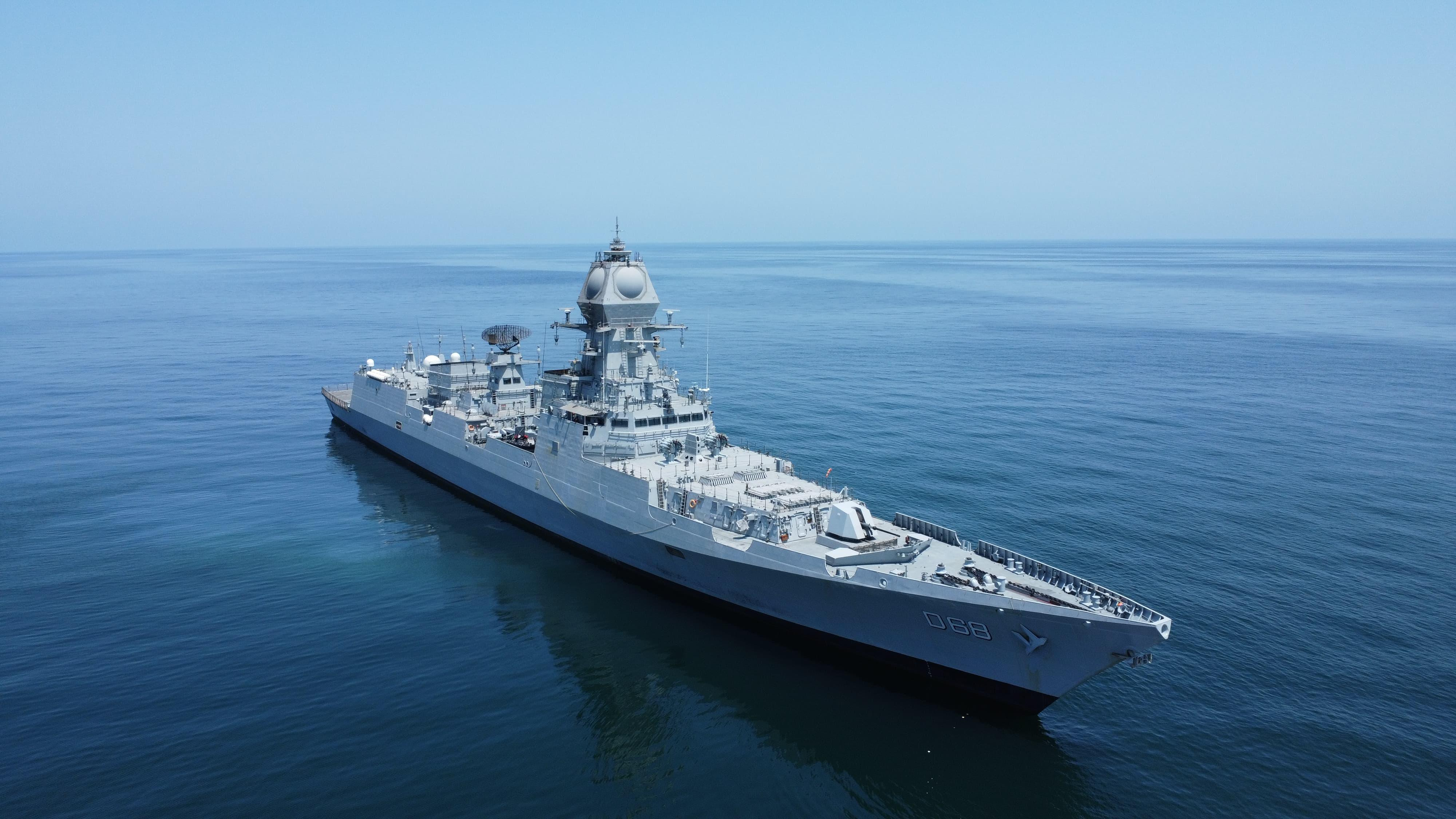
- Imphal (D68) at sea

History

India
- Name: Imphal
- Namesake: Imphal
- Owner: Indian Navy
- Operator: Indian Navy
- Builder: Mazagon Dock Limited
- Cost: Rs. 8,950 Crore (1.3 Billion USD)
- Laid down: 19 May 2017
- Launched: 20 April 2019
- Acquired: 20 October 2023
- Commissioned: 26 December 2023
- Identification: Pennant number: D68
- Status: Commissioned
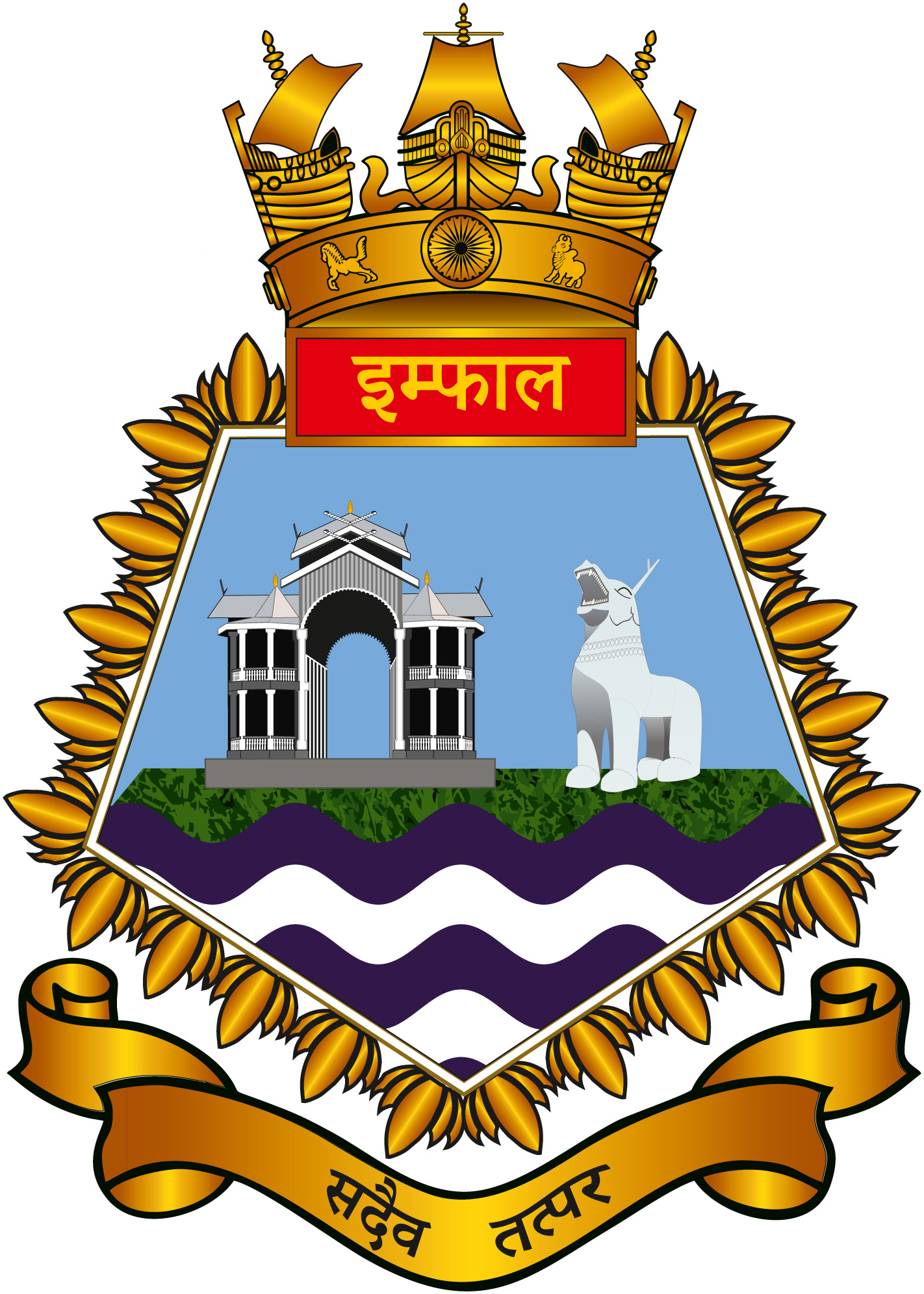
- Badge

General characteristics
- Type: Guided missile destroyer
- Displacement: 7,400 t (7,300 long tons; 8,200 short tons)
- Length: 163 m (535 ft)
- Beam: 17.4 m (57 ft)
- Draft: 6.5 m (21 ft)
- Propulsion: COGAG; 2 x Zorya M36E gas turbines, with 4 × DT-59 reversible gas turbines and 2 × RG-54 gearboxes; 2 × Bergen/GRSE KVM-diesel engines, 9,900 hp (7,400 kW) each; 4 × 1 MWe Wärtsilä WCM-1000 generator sets driving Cummins KTA50G3 engines and Kirloskar 1 MV AC generators
- Speed: In excess of 30 knots (56 km/h)
- Range: 8,000 nautical miles (15,000 km; 9,200 mi) at 18 knots (33 km/h; 21 mph)
- Endurance: 45 days
- Boats & landing craft carried: 4 x RHIB
- Crew: 300 (50 officers + 250 sailors)
- Sensors & processing systems: Radar :-; IAI EL/M-2248 MF-STAR S-Band AESA radar; BEL RAWL-02/LW-08 L-Band air-search radar; Terma/Tata Scanter-6002 X-Band surface-search radar; Sonar :-; BEL HUMSA-NG active/passive sonar; BEL "Nagin" active towed-array sonar; Combat Suite :-; "Combat Management System" (CMS)
- Electronic warfare & decoys: DRDO "Shakti" EW suite (equipped with ESM/ECM and "Radar Finger Printing System" (RFPS)); DRDO "Nayan" COMINT suite; Decoys :-; 4 x Kavach decoy launchers; 2 x Maareech torpedo-countermeasure systems
- Armament: 48 VLS; Anti-air warfare :-; 4 × 8-cell VLS, for a total of 32 Barak 8 surface-to-air missiles; Anti-surface warfare :-; 2 x 8-cell VLS, for 16 BrahMos anti-ship missiles; Anti-submarine warfare :-; 4 × 533 mm (21 in) torpedo tubes; 2 × RBU-6000 anti-submarine rocket launchers; Guns :-; 1 × OTO Melara 76 mm naval gun; 4 x AK-630M CIWS; 2 x OFT 12.7 mm M2 Stabilized Remote Controlled Gun
- Aircraft carried: 2 × HAL Dhruv (or) Sea King Mk. 42B
- Aviation facilities: Enclosed helicopter hangar and flight deck capable of accommodating two multi-role helicopters.
- Notes: Modified derivative of the Kolkata-class destroyer.

INS Imphal is the third ship of the Visakhapatnam-class stealth guided missile destroyer of the Indian Navy. She was being constructed at Mazagon Dock Limited (MDL) and was launched on 20 April 2019. The ship started sea trials on 28 April 2023, and was delivered to the Indian Navy on 20 October 2023. It was commissioned on 26 December 2023.

The ship was named in recognition of Manipur's sacrifices and contribution to India's freedom struggle including the Anglo-Manipur War of 1891 or the Indian National Army under leadership of Subhas Chandra Bose raising the Indian flag on 14 April 1944 at Moirang. It is the first Indian Navy ship named after a city in Northeast India.

== Construction ==
The keel of Imphal was laid down on 19 May 2017, and she was launched on 20 April 2019 at Mazagon Dock Limited of Mumbai. She began her sea trials on 28 April 2023. She was subsequently delivered to the Indian Navy on 20 October 2023. She was commissioned on 26 December 2023 in the presence of the Defence Minister Rajnath Singh at Mumbai. Captain Kamal Kumar Choudhury is the commissioning commanding officer.

== Ship badge ==
The badge depicts the Kangla Sanathong (Meitei for 'Kangla Golden Gate') on the left and Kanglā Shā on the right, two of the most remarkable cultural heritages of the Meitei civilization. The Kangla Palace is situated in Imphal and is an important historical and archaeological site of Manipur. It was the traditional seat of the Ningthouja dynasty. The Kanglā Shā is a mythical being from Meitei mythology and religion. Considered sacred to Meitei heritage, it has a dragon's head and lion's body, and is the guardian/protector of its people. Kanglā Shā is also the state emblem of Manipur.

== Deployment ==
The ship was deployed in the Arabian Sea immediately after commissioning as part of a task force meant to deter Houthi attacks on commercial shipping in the area.

On 10 March 2025, INS Imphal made a port visit to Port Louis, Mauritius, keeping with the tradition of Indian warships and aircraft participating in Mauritius National Day celebrations.

== Gallery ==
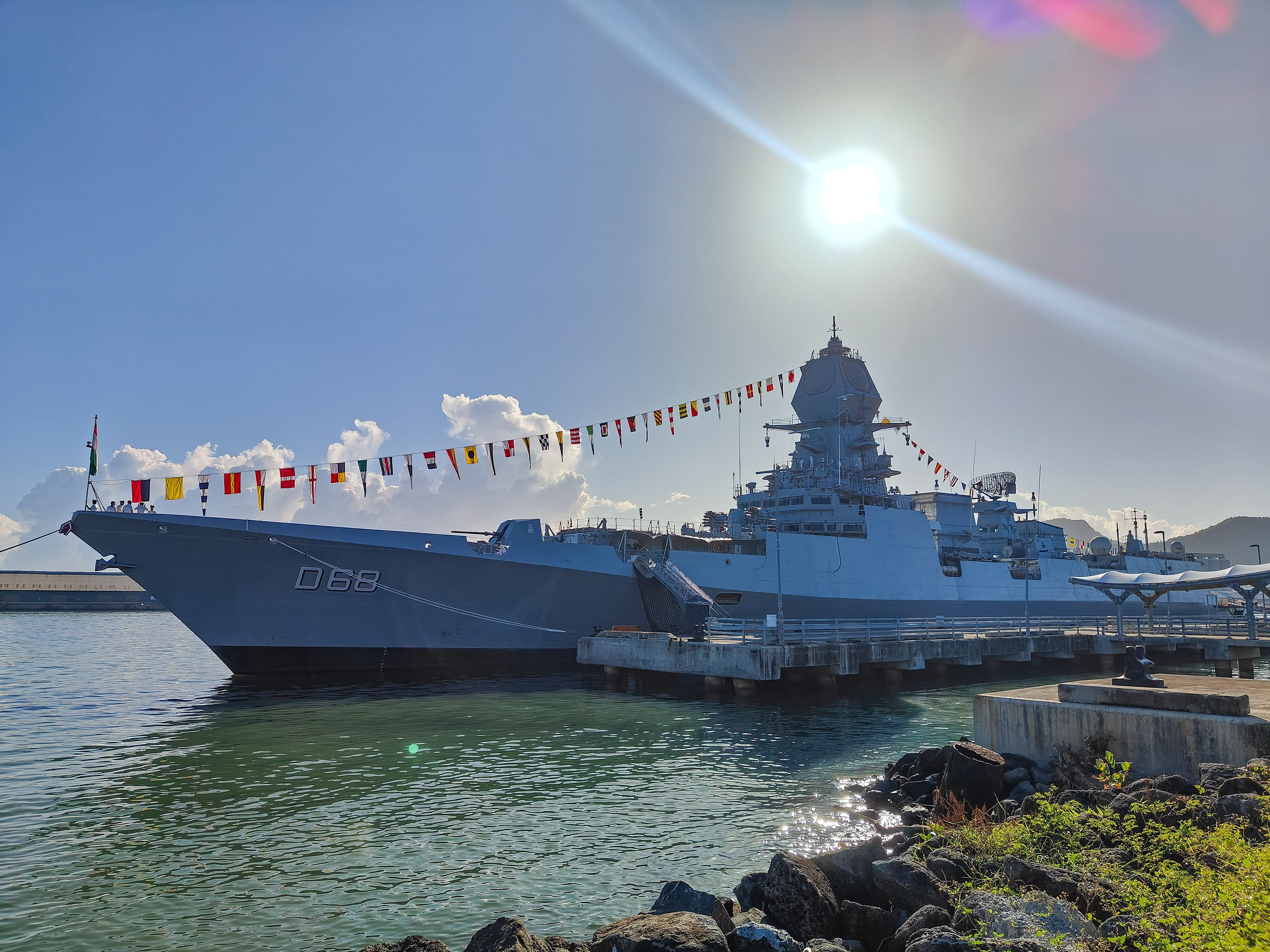
Imphal (D68) of Indian Navy at Port Louis, Mauritius.

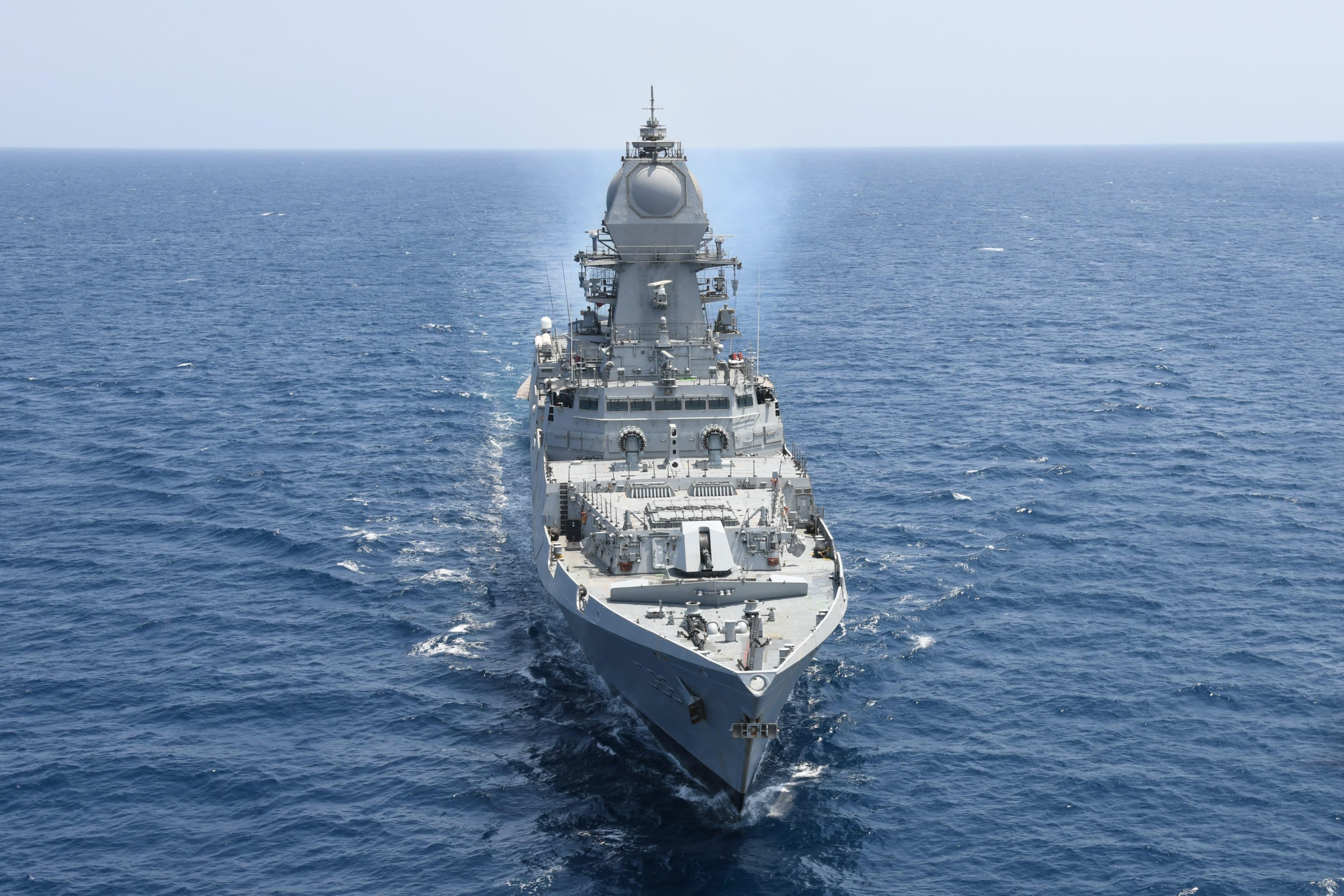
Imphal (D68) of Indian Navy's Western Fleet.

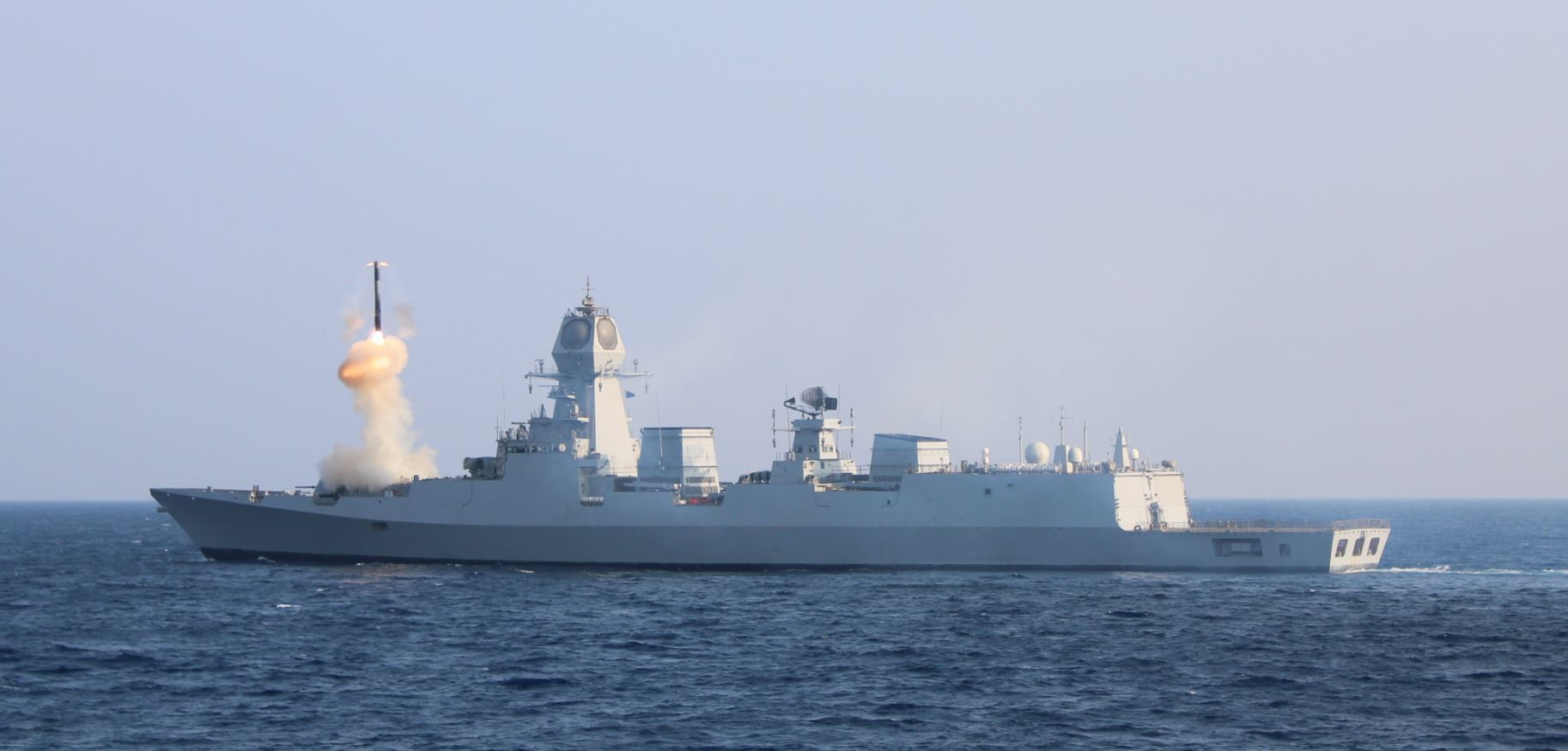
Imphal Y-12706 launching during trials.

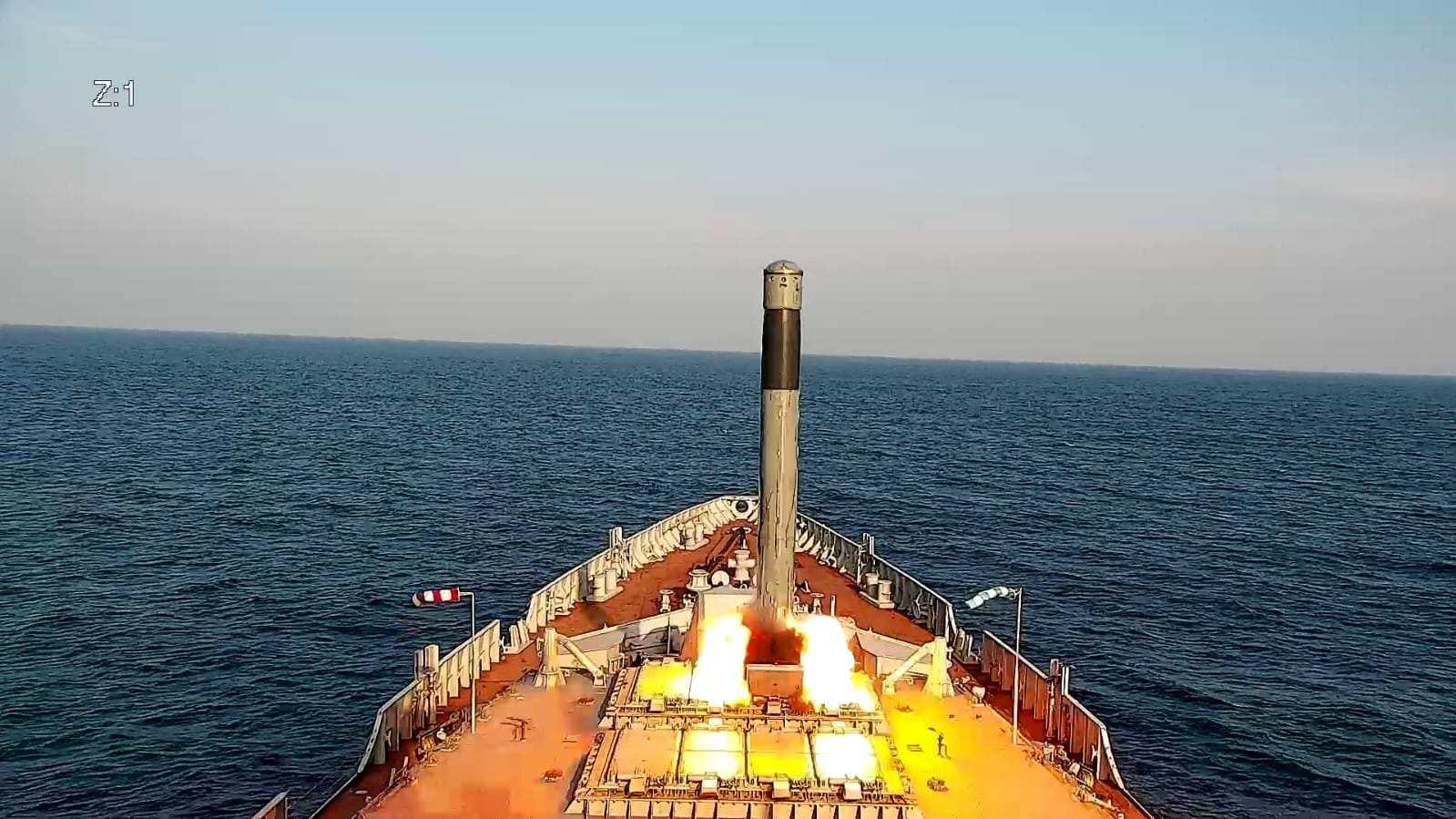
BrahMos being launched from Imphal Y-12706.

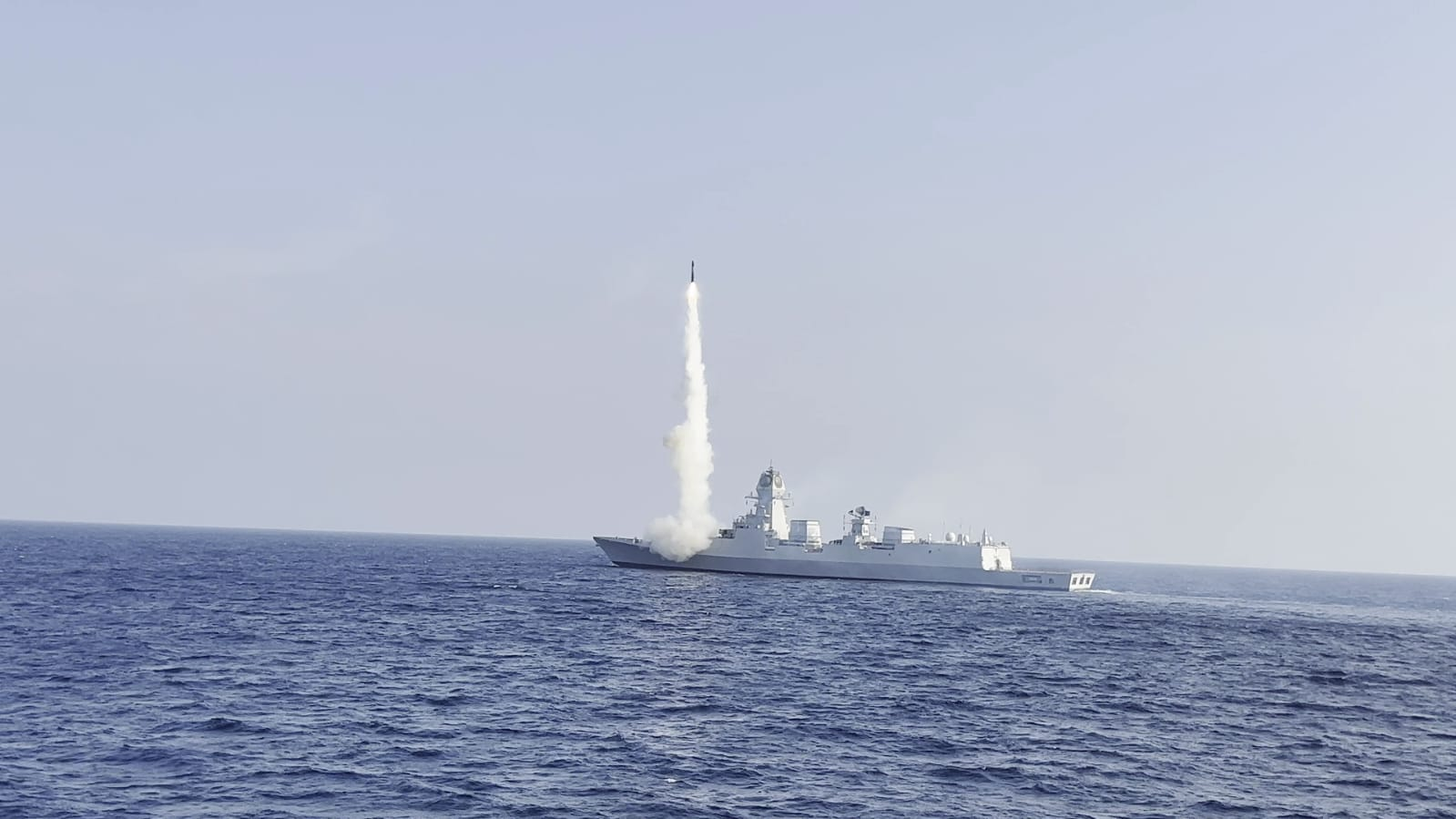
Imphal Y-12706, Visakhapatnam class launching during trials.
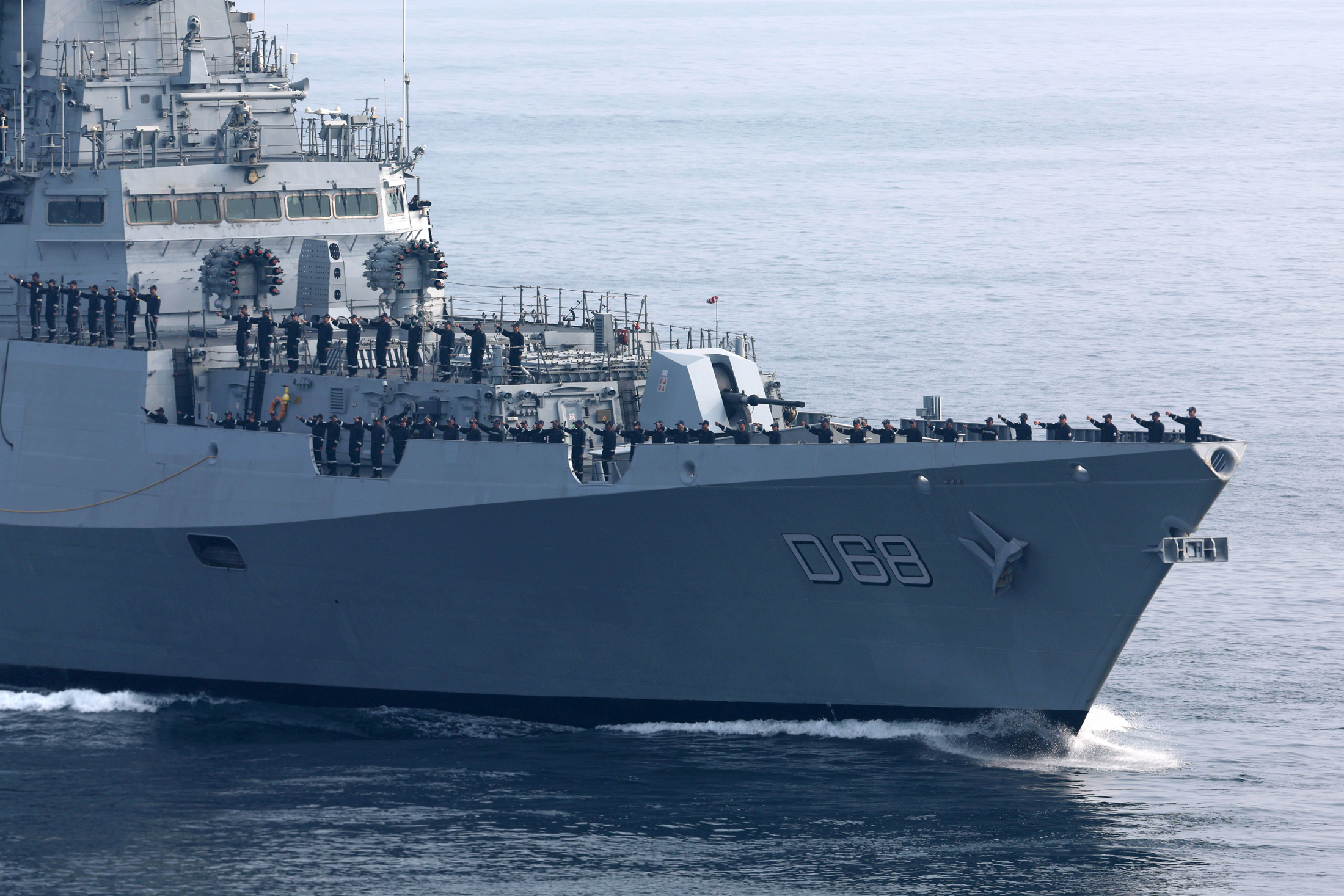

== See also ==
- Delhi-class destroyer
- Kolkata-class destroyer
- INS Surat
