= Visakhapatnam-class destroyer =

Class of stealth guided missile destroyers

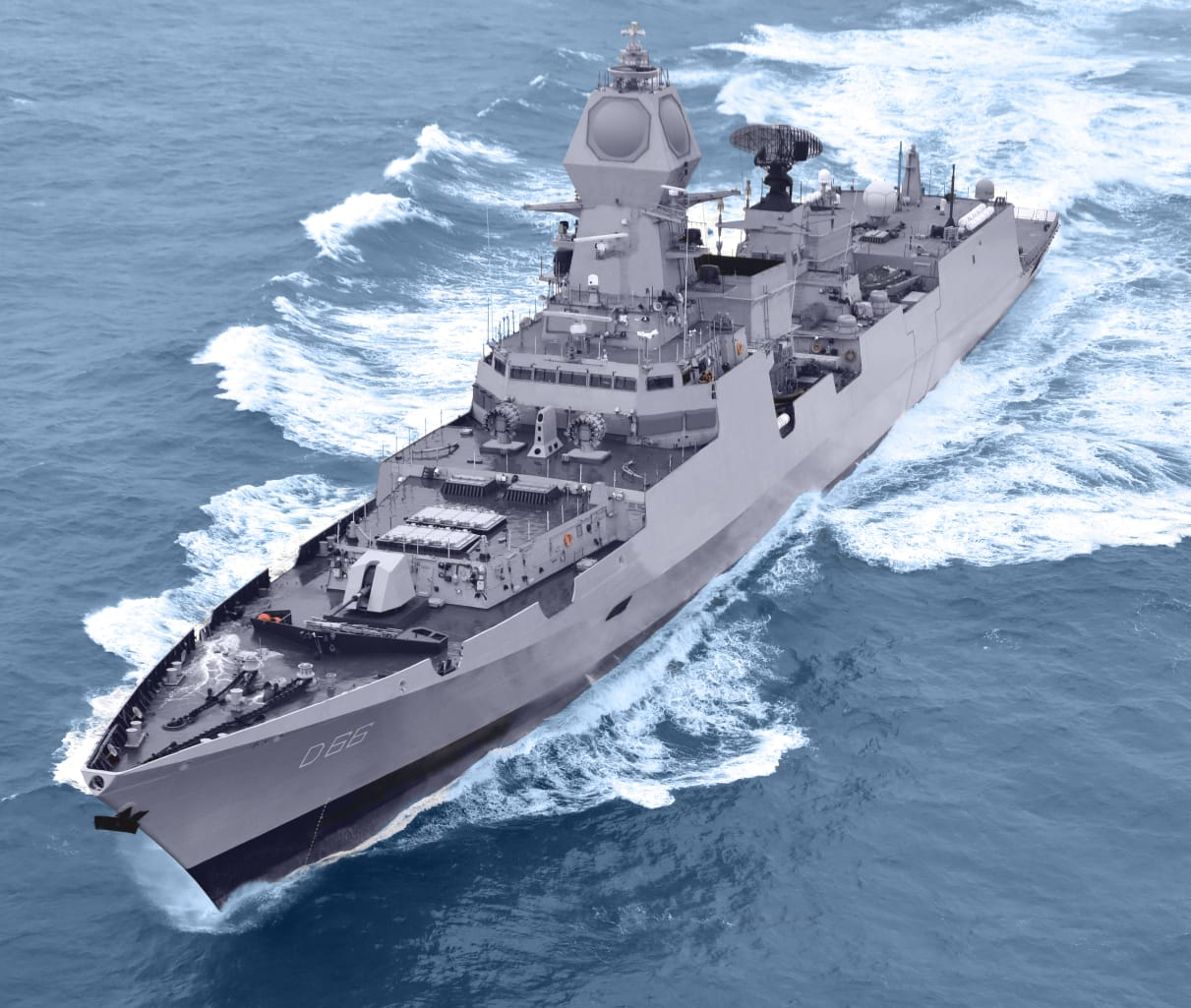
- INS Visakhapatnam, the lead ship of the class.

Class overview
- Name: Visakhapatnam-class
- Builders: Mazagon Dock Shipbuilders Limited (MDL)
- Operators: Indian Navy
- Preceded by: Kolkata class
- Succeeded by: Project 15C; Project 18A
- Cost: ₹35,800 crore (equivalent to ₹420 billion or US$4.4 billion in 2023) for four ships (FY 2020); ₹8,950 crore (equivalent to ₹110 billion or US$1.1 billion in 2023) per ship (FY 2020)
- Planned: 4
- Completed: 4
- Active: 4

General characteristics
- Type: Guided missile destroyer
- Displacement: 7,400 t (7,300 long tons)
- Length: 163 m (534 ft 9 in)
- Beam: 17.4 m (57 ft 1 in)
- Draft: 6.5 m (21 ft 4 in)
- Propulsion: COGAG; 2 × Zorya M36E gas turbines, with 4 × DT-59 reversible gas turbines and 2 × RG-54 gearboxes; 2 × Bergen/GRSE KVM-diesel engines, 9,900 hp (7,400 kW) each; 4 × 1 MWe Wärtsilä WCM-1000 generator sets driving Cummins KTA50G3 engines and Kirloskar 1 MV AC generators
- Speed: In excess of 33.5 knots (62.0 km/h; 38.6 mph)
- Range: 9,000 nmi (17,000 km; 10,000 mi) at 18 knots (33 km/h; 21 mph)
- Endurance: 55 days
- Boats & landing craft carried: 4 × RHIB
- Crew: 300 (50 officers + 250 sailors)
- Sensors & processing systems: Radar :-; IAI EL/M-2248 MF-STAR S-Band AESA radar; BEL RAWL-02/LW-08 L-Band air-search radar; Terma/Tata Scanter-6002 X-Band surface-search radar; Sonar :-; BEL HUMSA-NG active/passive sonar; BEL Nagin active towed-array sonar; Combat Suite :-; "Combat Management System" (CMS)
- Electronic warfare & decoys: DRDO Shakti EW suite (equipped with ESM/ECM and "Radar Finger Printing System" (RFPS)); DRDO Nayan COMINT suite; Decoys :-; 4 × Kavach decoy launchers; 2 × Maareech torpedo-countermeasure systems
- Armament: Anti-air warfare :-; 4 × 8-cell VLS, for a total of 32 Barak 8 surface-to-air missiles; Anti-surface warfare :-; 2 × 8-cell VLS, for 16 BrahMos anti-ship missiles; Anti-submarine warfare :-; 4 × 533 mm (21 in) torpedo tubes; 2 × RBU-6000 anti-submarine rocket launchers; Guns :-; 1 × OTO Melara 76 mm naval gun; 4 × AK-630M CIWS; 4 × OFT 12.7 mm M2 Stabilized Remote Controlled Gun
- Aircraft carried: 2 × HAL Dhruv, Sikorsky SH-60 Seahawk or Sea King Mk. 42B
- Aviation facilities: Enclosed helicopter hangar and flight deck capable of accommodating two multi-role helicopters.
- Notes: Modified derivative of the Kolkata-class destroyer.

The Visakhapatnam-class destroyers, also classified as the P-15 Bravo class, or simply P-15B, is a class of guided-missile destroyers currently being built for the Indian Navy. The Visakhapatnam class is an upgraded derivative of its predecessor, the Kolkata class, with improved features of stealth, automation and ordnance.

Designed by the Warship Design Bureau (WDB), a total of four ships are being built by Mazagon Dock Limited (MDL), under the Make in India initiative. The first vessel of the class, INS Visakhapatnam was commissioned on 21 November 2021. The final ship of the class, INS Surat, was commissioned on 15 January 2025.

== Design ==
=== Development ===
The destroyers were designed by the Warship Design Bureau, a branch of the Navy responsible for designing the service's warships, several among them including the Arihant-class submarines - India's first indigenously designed nuclear-powered ballistic missile submarines, INS Vikrant - India's first indigenously designed aircraft carrier, and the Kolkata-class destroyers.

The destroyer was designed under the codename Project 15B. The project was initiated to develop a class of destroyers that are more advanced than the Kolkata-class destroyers (P-15A), but with only several, yet incremental alterations. This was done to minimize its development costs and time.

The design plans of the four vessels were completed by the WDB in mid-2013.

=== Comparison to the Kolkata-class destroyers ===
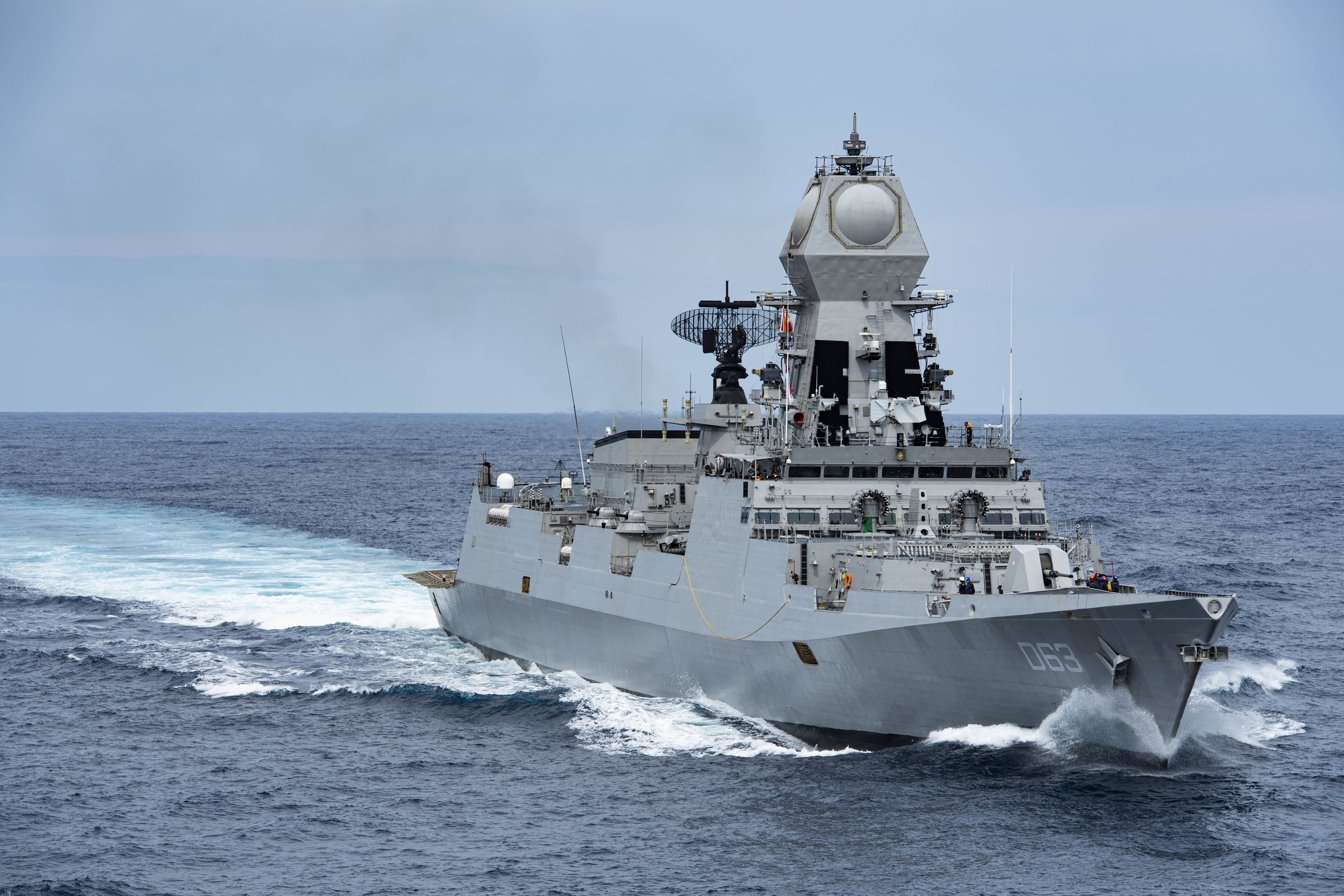
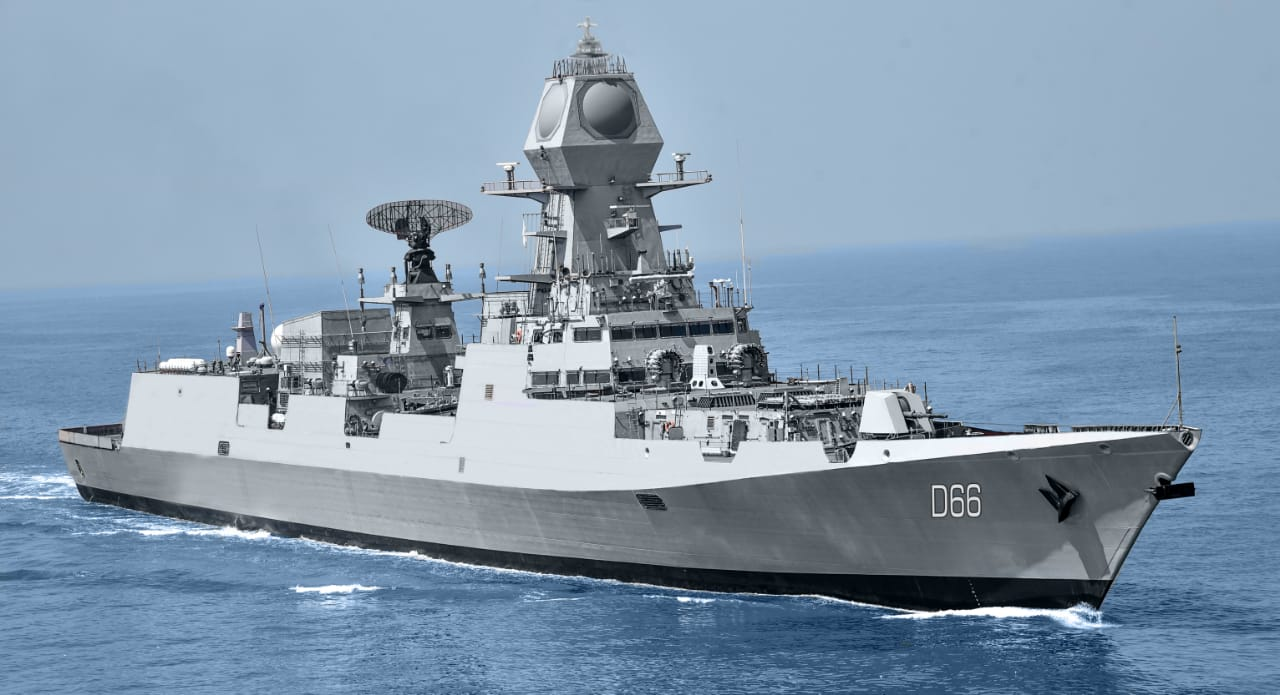
A comparison of the Vishakapatnam-class and the Kolkata-class destroyers, with their design differences clearly visible.

The P-15B is a derivative of the Kolkata-class destroyers (P-15A), a class of three stealth guided-missile destroyers, which currently serve as the IN's frontline destroyers; both classes feature several differences, with regard to their respective designs. Some of the known changes are as follows :-

- Observed as one of the most distinctive features, the P-15B and the P-15A feature different bridge layouts; the P-15B's bridge was designed to minimize the vessel's radar cross-section (RCS) and enhance resilience.
- Unlike the P-15A, the P-15B features a "rail-less" helicopter traversing system meant for securing the vessel's helicopter, in the event of adverse weather conditions.
- The P-15B features a network-centric layout, equipped with a Ship Data Network (SDN), an Automatic Power Management System (APMS), as well as a Combat Management System (CMS).

=== Features ===
- The destroyers are equipped with a "Total Atmosphere Control System" (TAC), which allows them to operate in regions of nuclear fallout. Additionally, the destroyers are also equipped with nuclear, biological and chemical warfare (NBC) protective equipment, with its entire requirement of air being filtered through NBC filters.
- An estimated 72% of the destroyers' components are indigenously sourced, as compared to 59% for the Kolkata-class destroyers and 42% for the Delhi-class destroyers.
- The destroyers feature multiple fire zones, battle damage control systems and distributional power systems for improved survivability and reliability in emergent conditions.
- The destroyers feature ergonomically designed accommodations based on modular concepts, which ensures a significant amount of crew comfort.

=== Naming ===
In accordance with naval traditions, the P-15B destroyers were christened after major Indian cities with historical and cultural connections, namely, Visakhapatnam, Mormugao, Imphal and Surat - representing the Indian states of Andhra Pradesh, Goa, Manipur and Gujarat. Notably, INS Imphal and INS Mormugao were the first two destroyers to be christened as namesakes of important cities from the regions of Northeastern India and Goa, respectively.

== Instrumentation ==
=== Armament ===
- Anti-surface warfare

For its anti-surface warfare (ASuW) capabilities, the class features sixteen Brahmos anti-ship cruise missiles, capable of speeds of up to Mach 3. Manufactured by BrahMos Aerospace. The BrahMos is widely regarded as one of the most formidable anti-ship missiles currently in service, given the missile's extreme versatility and maneuverability.

Additionally, the vessels of the class are equipped with one OTO Melara 76 mm naval gun manufactured by Bharat Heavy Electricals Limited at their Haridwar facility. Originally, the IN had planned to install the Mk-45 127 mm (5 in) naval gun, manufactured by BAE; however, this plan was scrapped in 2021, on account of financial constraints.

- Anti-air warfare

As part of its anti-air warfare (AAW) capabilities, the class features thirty-two Barak 8 surface-to-air missiles, with sixteen missiles present in four "2 x 4" VLS configurations - with two placed at the bow and two placed aft. The launchers were manufactured by Bharat Electronics at their Bangalore facility.

The Barak 8, also classified as the LR-SAM, is designed to neutralize various aerial threats, including fighter aircraft, helicopters, anti-ship missiles, cruise missiles, ballistic missiles and unmanned aerial vehicles (UAV); the new variant is expected to feature a range of about 150 km (93 mi).

For point defense, the vessels are equipped with four AK-630M close-in weapon systems (CIWS), with two systems on either side of the superstructure.

- Anti-submarine warfare

For its anti-submarine warfare (ASW) capabilities, the class features two twin torpedo launchers, designed to launch heavyweight torpedoes - such as the Varunastra heavyweight torpedo, developed by the Defence Research and Development Organization (DRDO). The class also features two RBU-6000 (RPK-8) anti-submarine rocket launchers, capable of firing ASW projectiles to depths of up to 1,000 m (3,300 ft). Both the RBU-6000 and torpedo tubes were manufactured by Larsen & Toubro's Mumbai facility.

- Aviation facilities

As part of its aviation facilities, the class is equipped with a flight deck and an enclosed aviation hangar, capable of two medium-sized helicopters – primarily the HAL Dhruv, or the Westland Sea King Mk. 42B. Additionally, the ships are equipped with a "rail-less" helicopter traversing system, meant for securing the helicopter in case of adverse weather conditions at sea.

- Decoys

As for the class' defensive abilities, each destroyer is equipped with two Kavach anti-missile decoy systems for neutralizing incoming aerial threats at short ranges.

=== Sensors ===
- Radar

The class features the IAI EL/M-2248 MF-STAR S band active electronically scanned array radar, as its primary radar suite. The EL/M-2248 is a multi-function, phased-array radar system featuring an azimuth of 360^{o}, with the capability to track both aerial and surface targets - at a range of over 450 km (280 mi).

The class further features the Thales LW 08 (BEL RAWL-02) as its secondary radar suite. The LW-08 is a solid-state, two-dimensional, long-range D band surveillance radar, meant for providing target acquisition against aerial and surface threats. It is capable of operating in a cluttered electronic environment, equipped with an instrumental range of 270 km (170 mi), with the capability to track both cruise missiles and fighter aircraft.

- Sonar

The class is equipped with the BEL HUMSA-NG sonar, a hull-mounted "active cum passive" integrated sonar system developed by the DRDO. The HUMSA-NG is capable of detecting, classifying and tracking sub-surface targets in both active and passive modes, with the capability to simultaneously track up to eight targets. The destroyers are also equipped with the BEL Nagin active towed array sonar.

- Electronic warfare

For electronic warfare (EW), the destroyers are equipped with the DRDL Shakti EW suite, designed to provide Indian warships an electronic layer of defence against modern radars and anti-ship missiles. Shakti is equipped with wideband electronic support measures (ESM) and electronic countermeasures (ECM), meant for intercepting, classifying and jamming both conventional and modern radars. Additionally, the suite is also equipped with an in-built radar fingerprinting and data recording replay feature for post-mission analysis and evaluation.

== History ==
=== Background ===
In March 2009, the Defence Acquisition Council (DAC), the arms-procurement wing of India's Ministry of Defence, approved the procurement of four 6,800 t destroyers, to be built by Mazagon Dock Shipbuilders (MDL).

Designed as a "follow-on" project to the Kolkata-class destroyers, the new destroyers were envisaged to feature only incremental changes to the former, in order to minimize developmental time and costs. At the time of the project's approval, the four new destroyers were envisaged to be more cheaper than other destroyer classes being built at the time, namely, the Hobart-class destroyers, the Daring-class destroyers and the Akizuki-class destroyers.

No competitive bidding was conducted for the development of the vessels, since MDL was the only Indian shipyard capable of building destroyers at the time.

The contract for the four warships was signed on 28 January 2011, at an estimated cost of ₹29,643.74 crore (equivalent to ₹610 billion or US$6.3 billion in 2023).

=== Construction ===
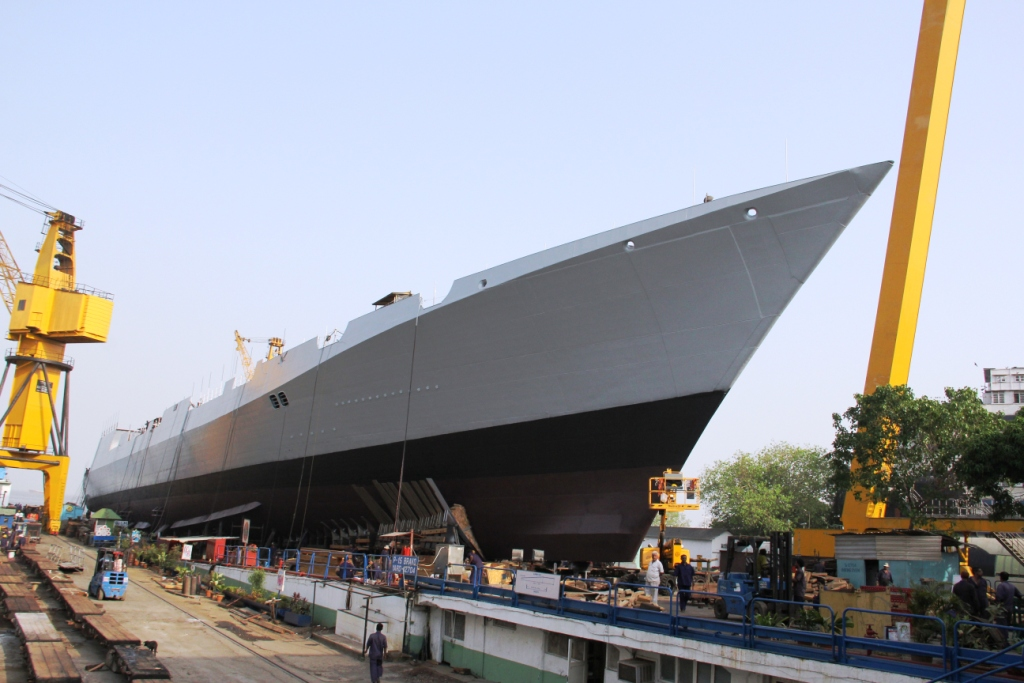
The unfinished hull of INS Visakhapatnam, on the day of its launch

The keel of the first vessel, INS Visakhapatnam, was laid by MDL in October 2013 and the ship was launched on 20 April 2015, in a ceremony attended by then-Indian naval chief Robin K. Dhowan. Originally slated to enter service in 2018, the delivery of the vessel was delayed by three years, owing to delays in the supply of the vessel's sensors and ordnance by foreign vendors.

In July 2019, a minor fire broke aboard the unfinished-Visakhapatnam, leaving one contract worker dead and another two injured. Irrespectively, the fire was noted to have not caused any hindrance to the vessel's construction schedule; the shipyard's construction activities subsequently resumed without delay.

Visakhapatnam completed its basin trials in December 2020 and subsequently proceeded for its sea trials in 2021. Initially scheduled to be delivered in April 2021, the vessel was delivered on October 28, owing to delays caused by the COVID-19 pandemic. On 21 November 2021, Visakhapatnam was commissioned into the IN.

The second vessel of the class, Mormugao, was laid in June 2015 and launched in September of that year. Completing its basin trials in early-December 2021, the destroyer proceeded on its maiden sea sortie on 19 December, coinciding with the 60th anniversary of Goa Liberation Day. Mormugao was delivered to the IN almost a year later, on 24 November 2022 and was commissioned on 18 December 2022.

Construction work on the third vessel, INS Imphal, began with the laying of its keel in May 2017; the hull was later launched on 20 April 2019, in a ceremony attended by then-Indian naval chief Sunil Lanba, and commenced sea trials on 28 April 2023. The ship was delivered to the Indian Navy on 20 October 2023, and was commissioned on 26 December 2023.

Construction on the final vessel of the class, INS Surat, began in July 2018; the hull was subsequently launched 17 May 2022, in a ceremony coinciding with the launch of INS Udaygiri, a Nilgiri-class frigate. On 18 June 2024, Surat begun her sea trials and shall be commissioned in the latter half of 2024. Surat was commissioned on 15 January 2025.

== Operational history ==
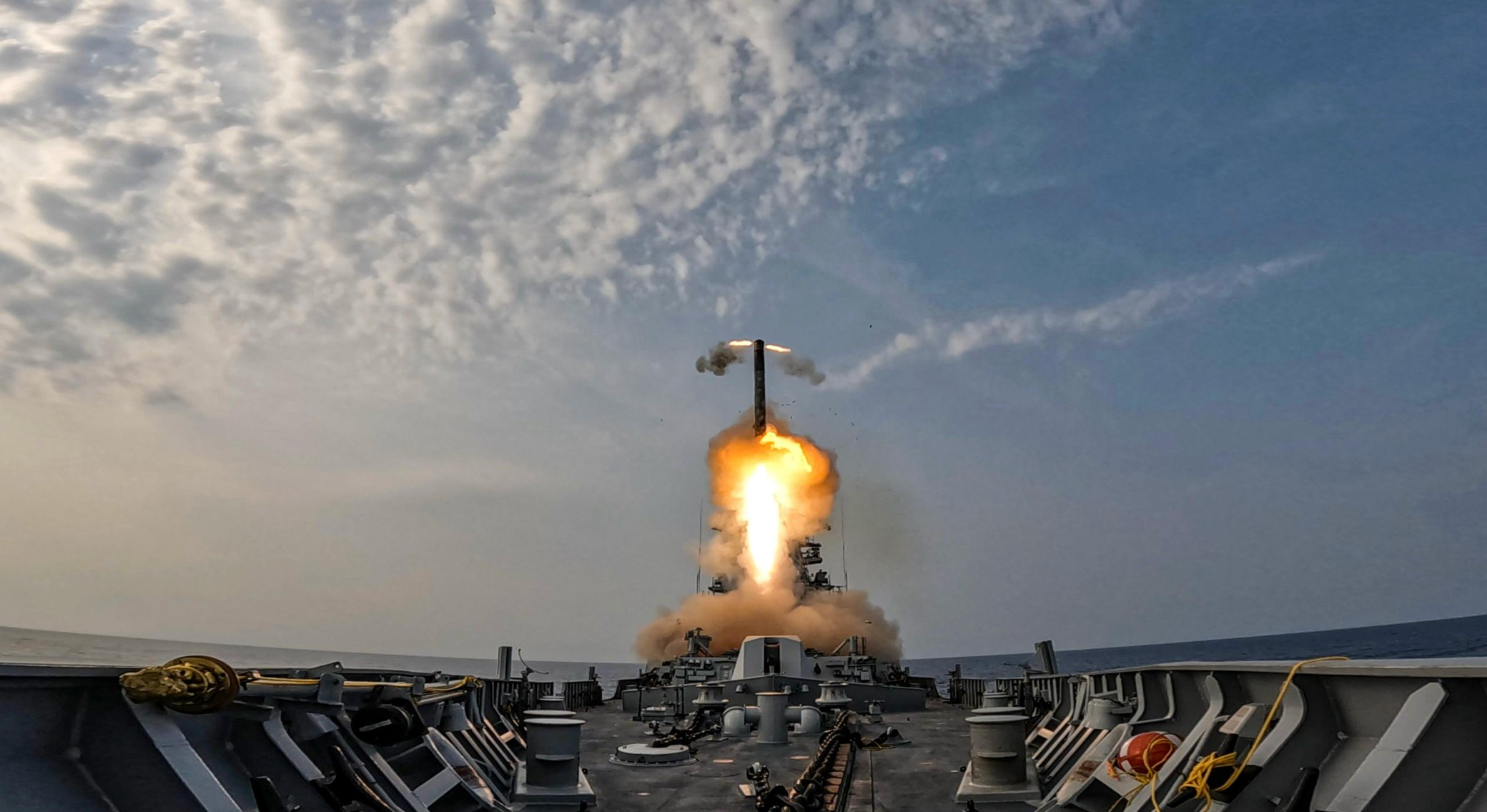
BrahMos Launch during Operation Sindoor

On 11 January 2022, only two months after its commissioning, Visakhapatnam successfully test-fired an upgraded variant of the BrahMos anti-ship missile, which was subsequently followed by another successful test-fire on 18 February. The destroyer later took part in the 12th edition of the IN's "Presidential Fleet Review" on 21 February 2022, an event which was attended by Indian president Ram Nath Kovind and Indian naval chief R. Hari Kumar.

On 14 May 2023, INS Mormugao successfully fired BrahMos Supersonic cruise missile. It successfully carried out the engagement of a sea-skimming supersonic target with its MRSAM missile on 23 May 2023.

== Ships in the class ==
Name	Pennant	Yard No	Laid down	Launched	Commissioned	Status
Visakhapatnam	D66	12704	12 October 2013	20 April 2015	21 November 2021	Active
Mormugao	D67	12705	4 June 2015	17 September 2016	24 December 2022	Active
Imphal	D68	12706	19 May 2017	20 April 2019	26 December 2023	Active
Surat	D69	12707	19 July 2018	17 May 2022	15 January 2025	Active

== Gallery ==
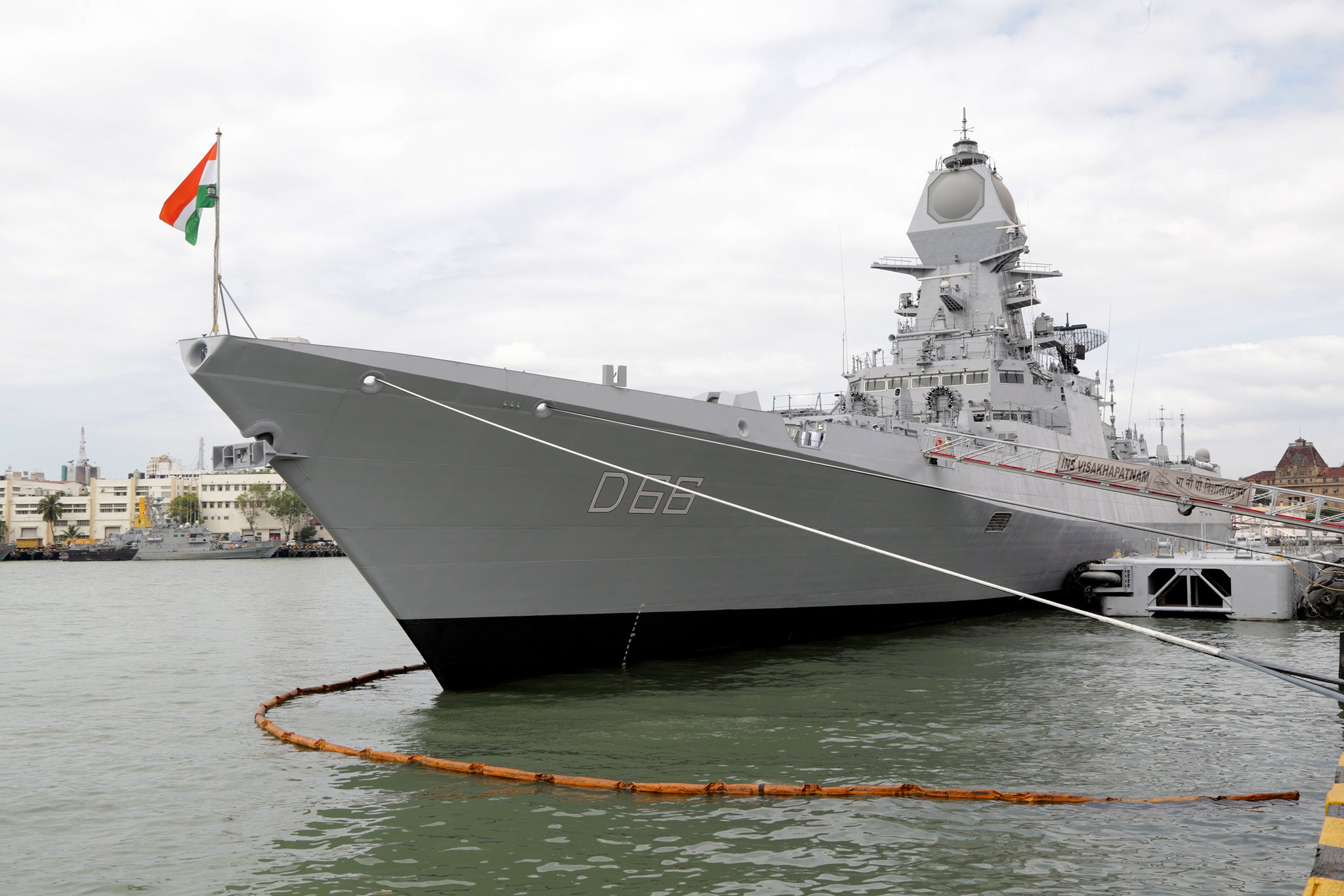
INS Visakhapatnam, on the eve of its commissioning.

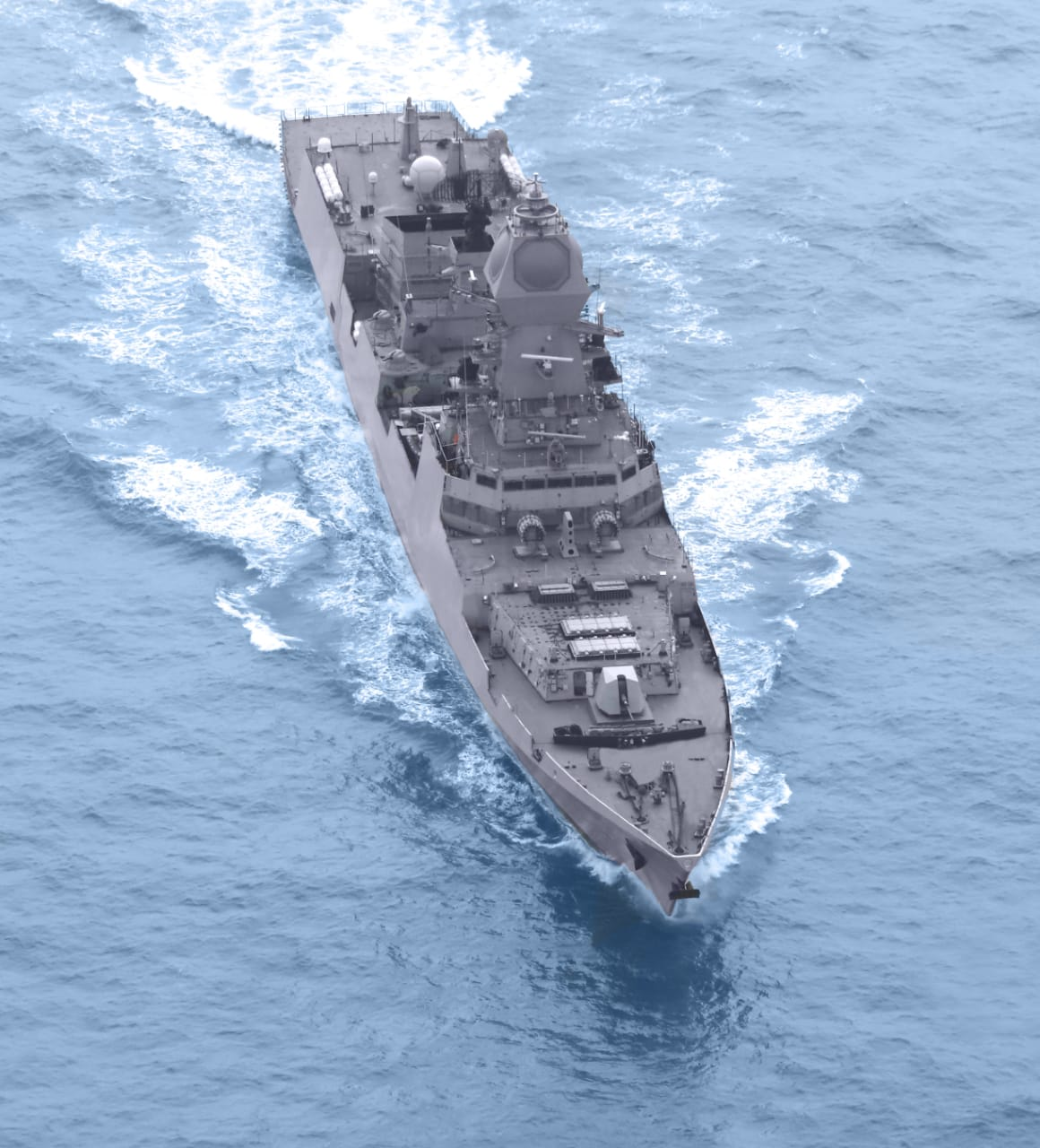
A overhead view of Visakhapatnam, with its weaponry and sensors clearly visible.

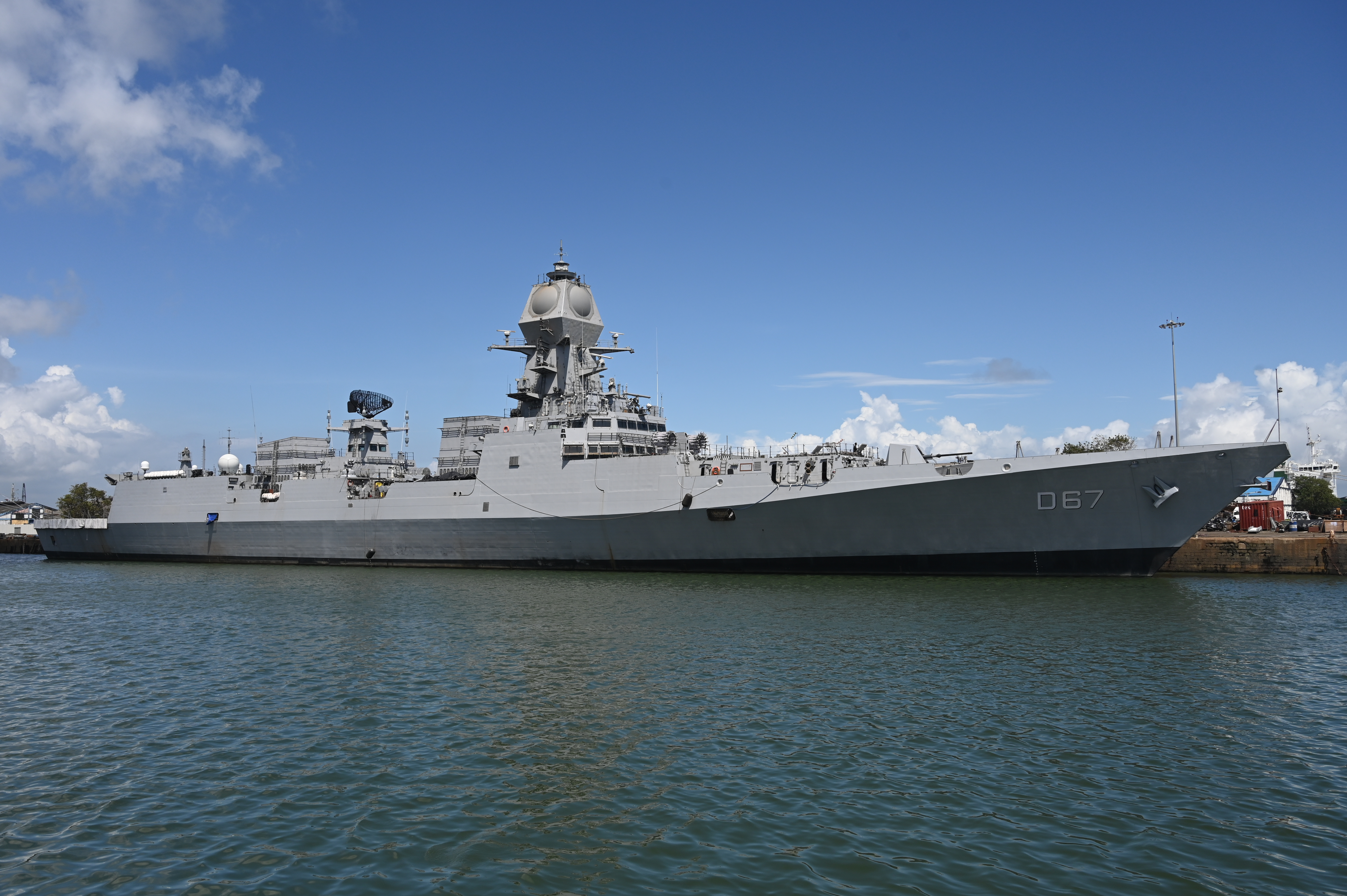
Mormugao - Y12705, second ship of Project 15B stealth guided missile destroyer.

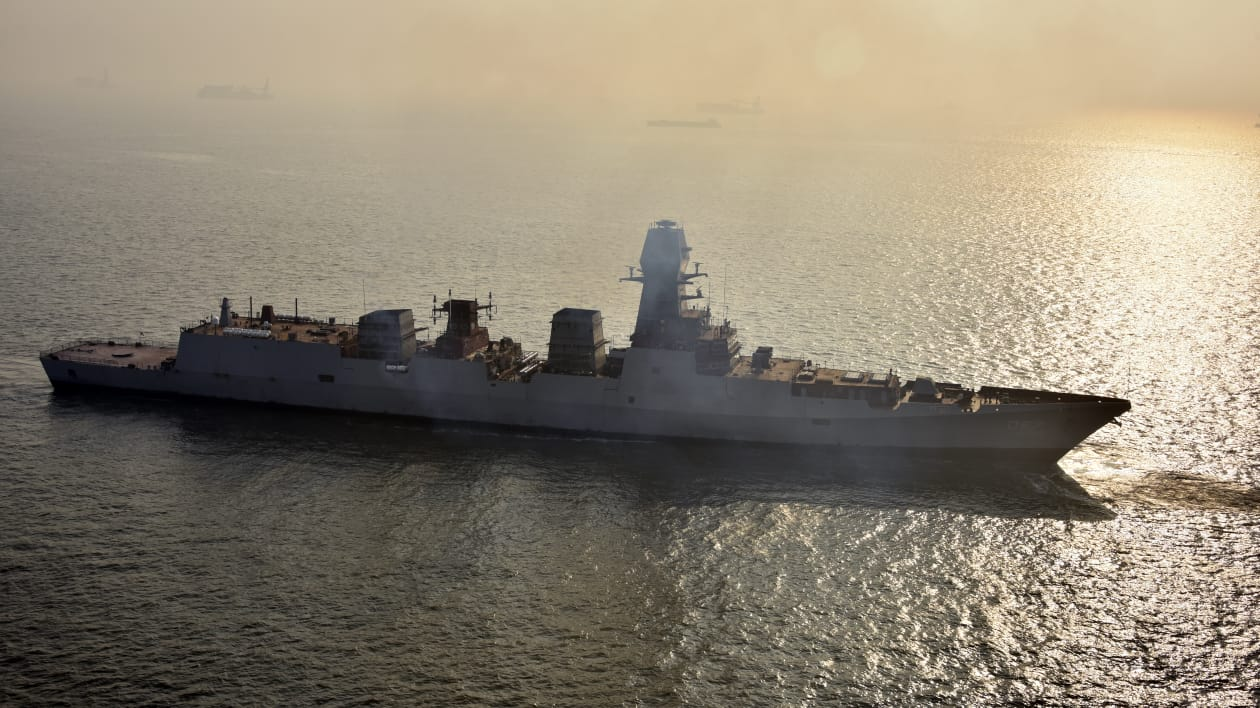
Mormugao - the second vessel of the class, photographed during its maiden sea trials.

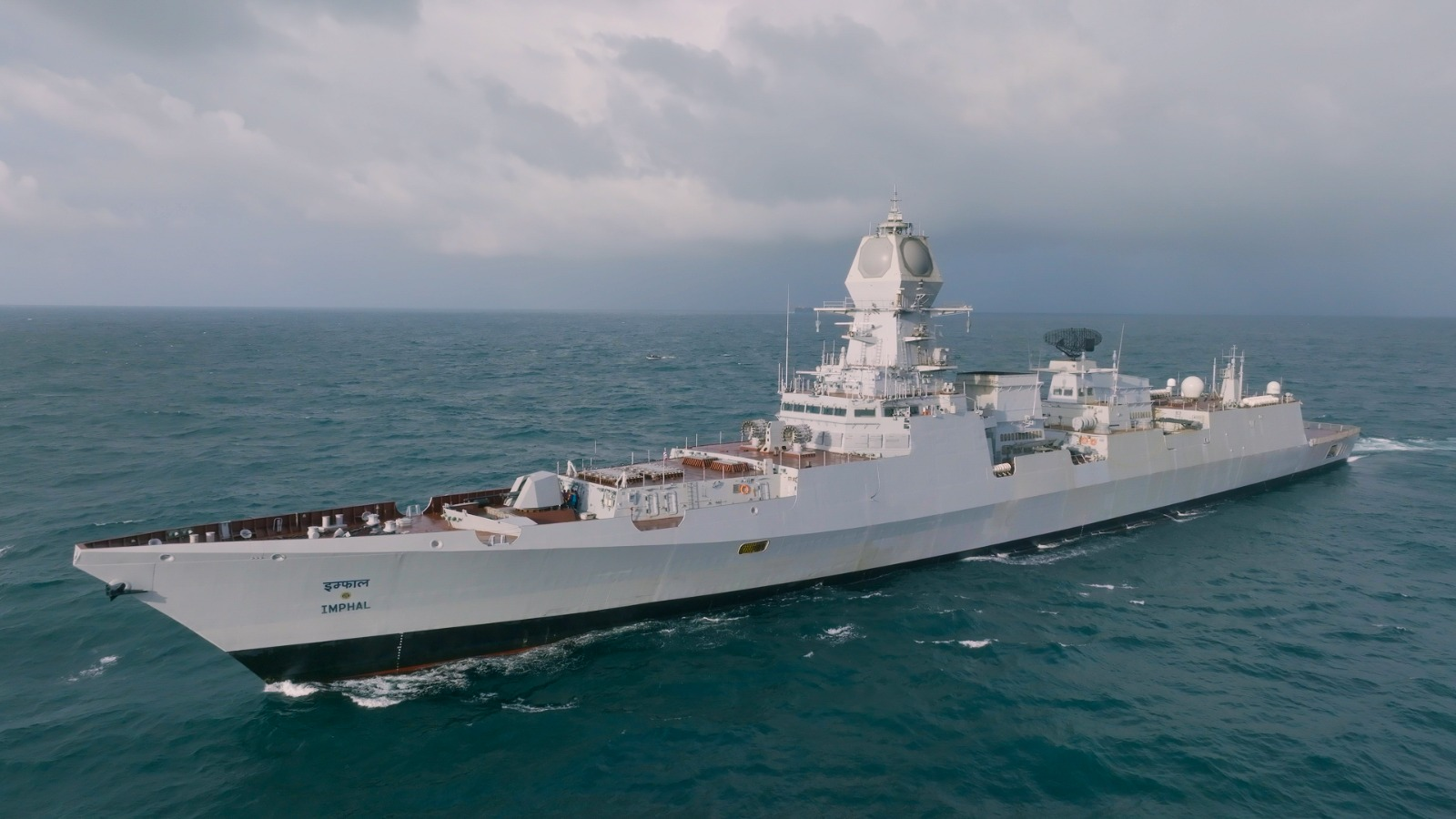
Imphal, the third ship of the class, on sea trials.

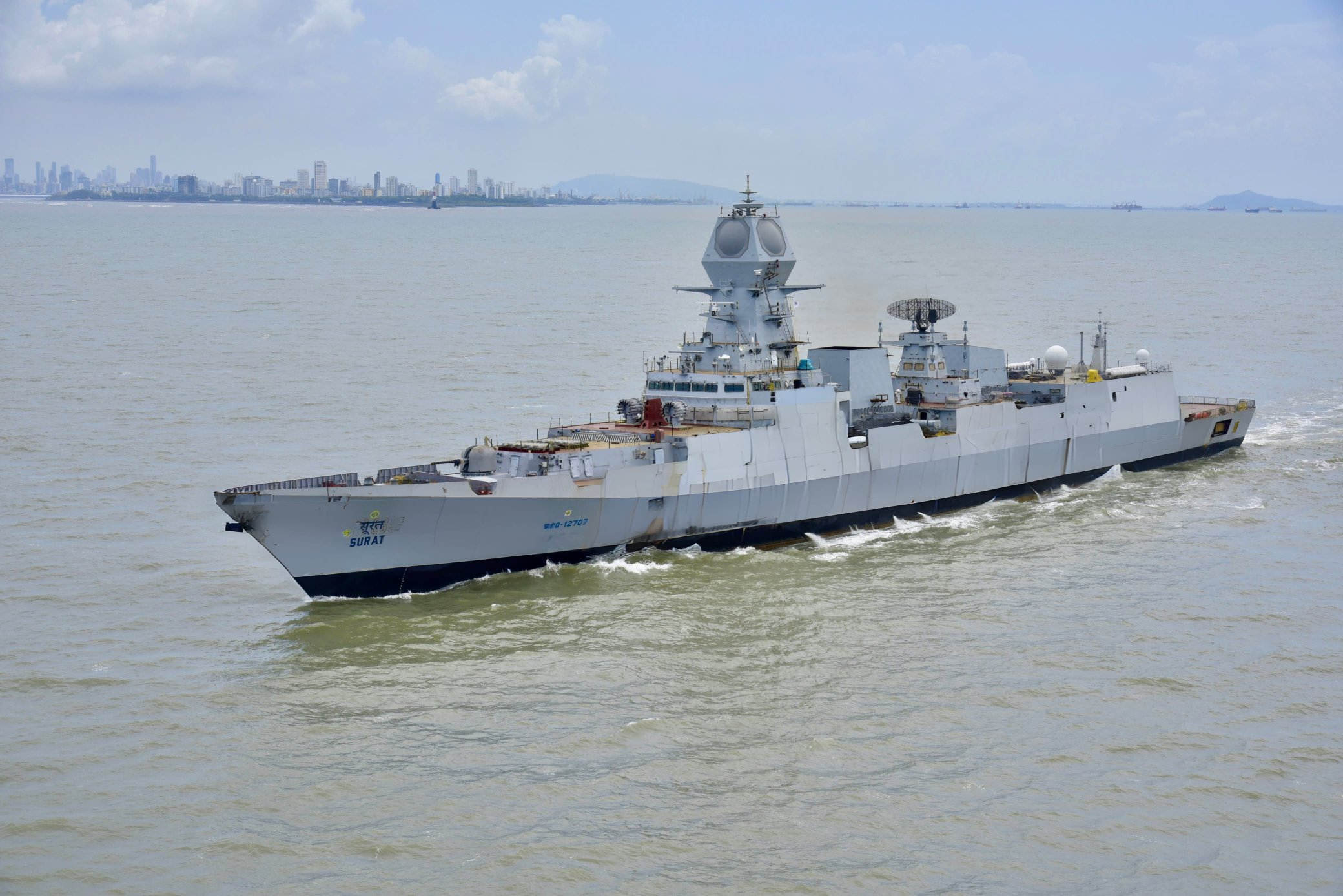
Surat, the fourth ship of the class, on sea trials.

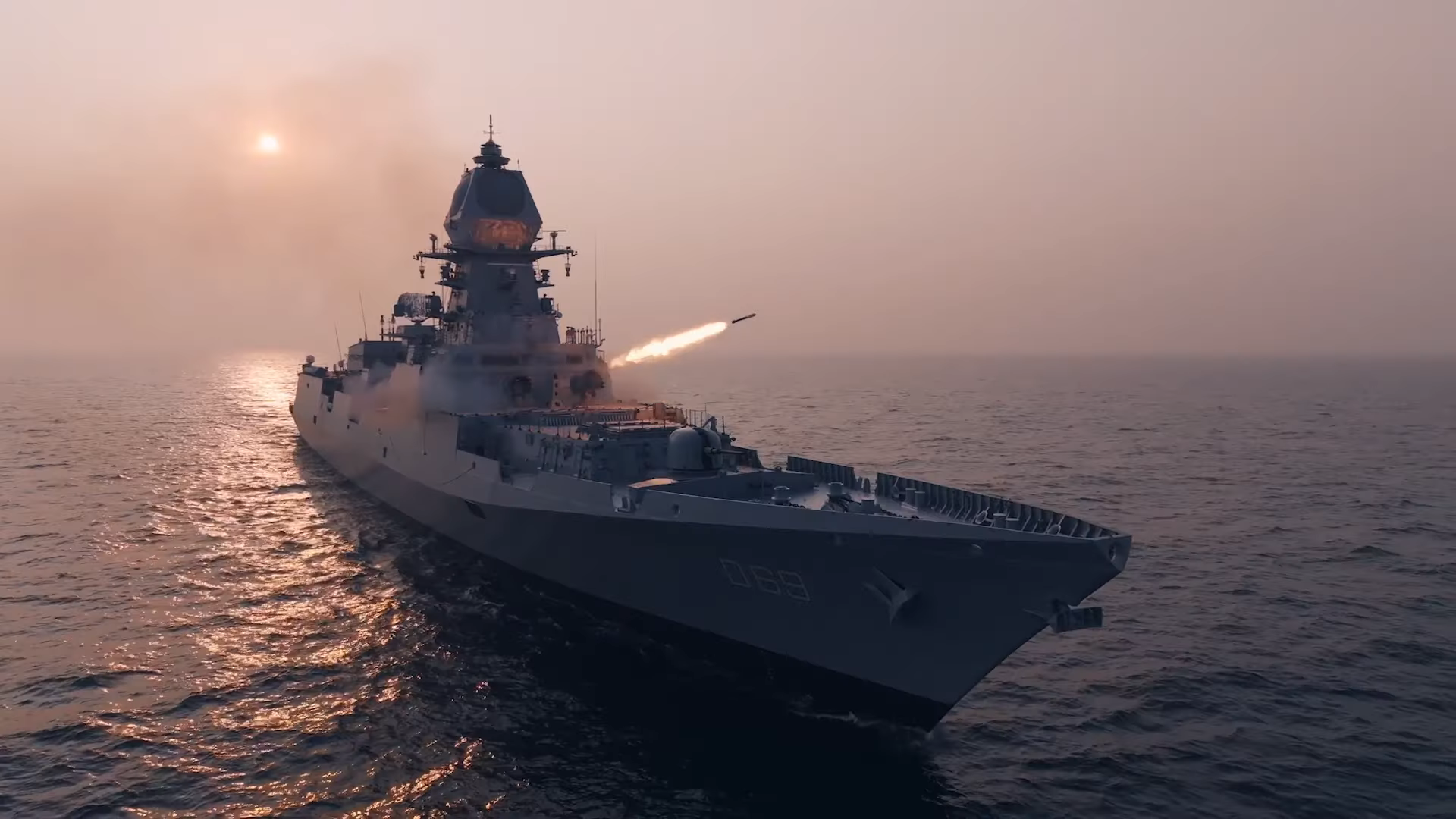
INS Surat, firing ASW rockets.

== Follow-on project ==
In December 2023, the then Vice Chief of Naval Staff, Vice Admiral Sanjay Jasjit Singh revealed that a class of advanced Next Generation Destroyers (NGD) was being designed by the Warship Design Bureau (WDB) which would follow the Project 15B destroyers. However, a report in November 2025 indicated the possibility of a Project 15C before the NGD programme, which will feature a clean slate design.

A report by NDTV in July 2026 confirmed that both the NGD, referred to as the Project 18A destroyers, and the Project 15C are advancing. The latter will comprise of four warships at a cost of ₹50,000 crore (US$5.2 billion). The request for proposal (RFP) is expected in 2027 with construction expected to start within three years of releasing the RFP.

== See also ==
- Future of the Indian Navy
- List of destroyer classes in service

Equivalent destroyers of the same era

- Hobart class
- Asahi class
- Choe Hyon class
