= Rahul Vilas Gokhale =

Indian Navy Admiral

Vice Admiral Rahul Vilas Gokhale YSM, NM
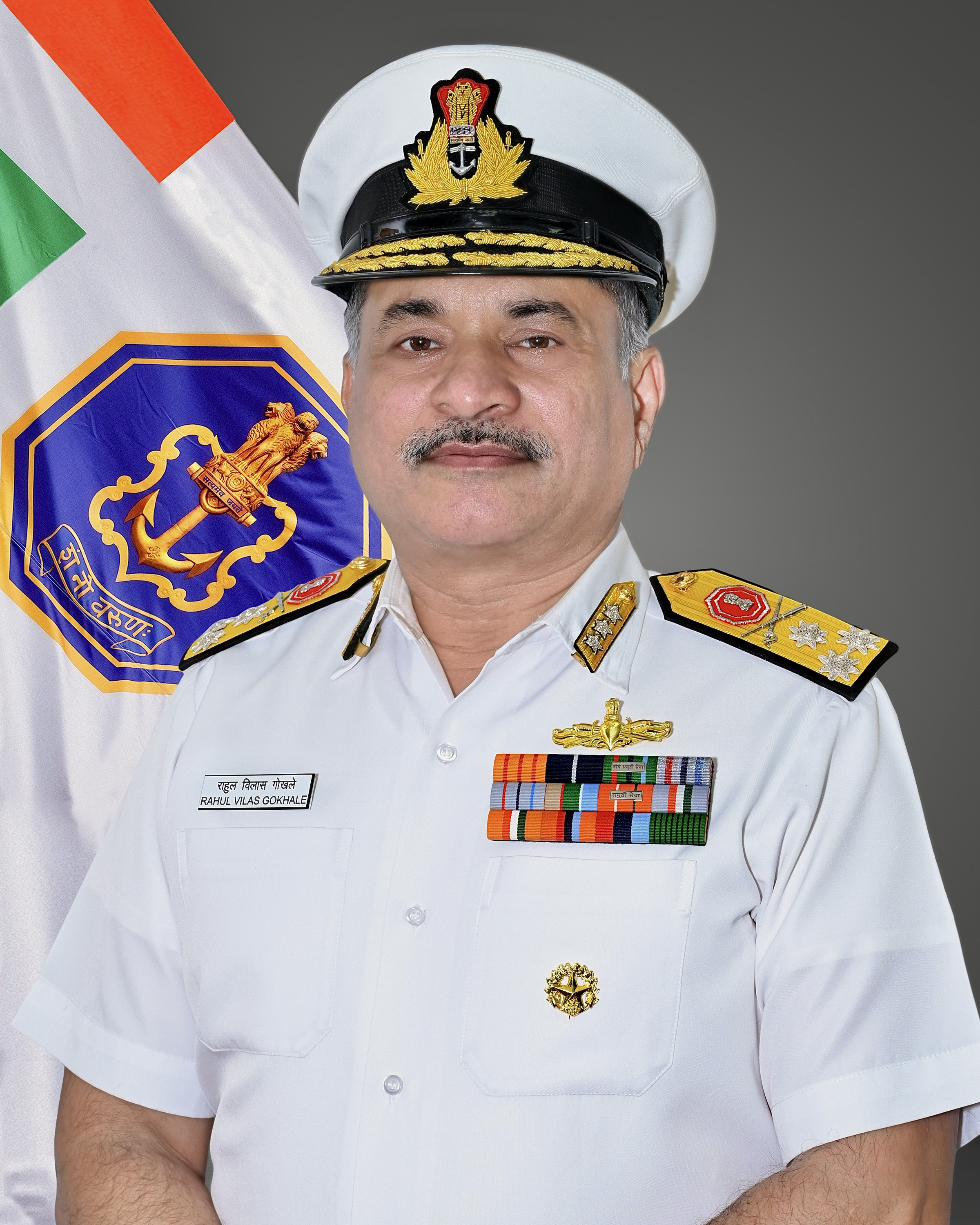
- Education: Indian Naval Academy
- Military career
- Allegiance: India
- Branch: Indian Navy
- Service years: 1 January 1992 – present
- Rank: Vice Admiral
- Service number: 03857-R
- Commands: Western Fleet; INS Circars; INS Kolkata (D63); INS Khukri (P49)
- Awards: Yudh Seva Medal; Nao Sena Medal

Vice Admiral Rahul Vilas Gokhale, YSM, NM is a serving flag officer in the Indian Navy. He currently serves as the chief of staff, Western Naval Command. He was the flag officer commanding Western Fleet during Operation Sindoor for which he was awarded the Yudh Seva Medal. He earlier commandedal base INS Circars and the guided missile destroyer INS Kolkata (D63).

== Naval career ==
Gokhale attended the National Defence Academy and was commissioned into the Indian Navy on 1 January 1992. He later specialized in Navigation and Direction. He has served on board, as the navigating officer, the Sukanya-class patrol vessel INS Subhadra (P51), the Nilgiri-class frigate INS Udaygiri (F35), the Kora-class corvette INS Kirch (P62) and the Godavari-class frigate INS Gomati (F21).

Gokhale served as the executive officer of the Kora-class corvette INS Kora (P61) and commanded the lead ship of her class of corvettes, INS Khukri (P49). He attended the Defence Services Staff College, Wellington. He was the navigating officer of her class of guided missile destroyers INS Delhi (D61).

Gokhale attended the Naval higher command course at the Naval War College, Goa. He served as the director of personnel policy at naval headquarters. He also served as the naval advisor at the High Commission of India, Islamabad. He also attended the Australian Defence College, Canberra. He commanded the lead ship of her class of stealth guided-missile destroyers, INS Kolkata (D63). During his tenure as commanding officer, Kolkata sailed on a two-month deployment to the Western Indian Ocean and called on multiple African ports to promote maritime security in the Indian Ocean Region.

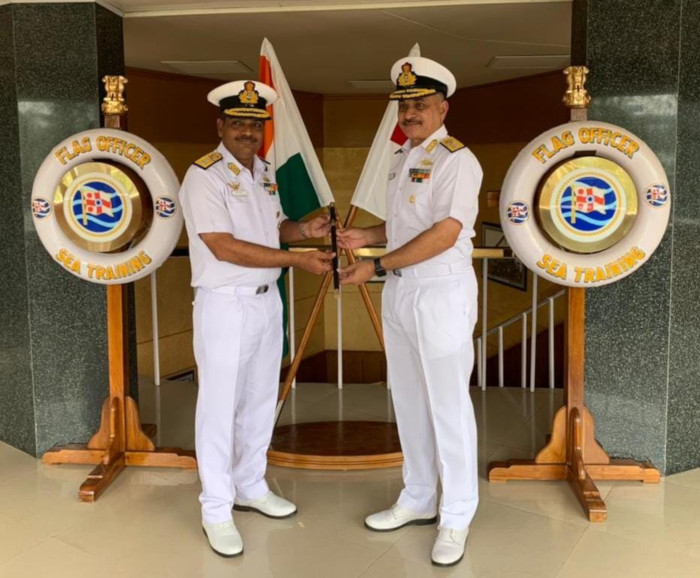
RAdm Gokhale taking over as FOST from RAdm Rajesh Dhankhar.

As a commodore, Gokhale served as the fleet operations officer (FOO) of the Eastern Fleet. On 29 May 2020, he took over as the 23rd commanding officer of the naval base INS Circars and as the station commander, Visakhapatnam. The oldest naval establishment on East Coast, Circars is the base depot ship providing administrative and logistics support to the Headquarters of the Eastern Naval Command and a large number of units based in and around Visakhapatnam. On 26 January 2021, he was awarded the Nao Sena Medal for devotion to duty.

=== Flag rank ===
Gokhale was promoted to flag rank in May 2022 and was appointed flag officer sea training (FOST), at Kochi. As FOST, his charter included the conduct of the operational sea training of all ships of the Indian Navy and the Indian Coast Guard. After a year-long tenure, he relinquished charge and handed over to Rear Admiral Susheel Menon. He then moved to naval headquarters as the assistant chief of personnel (HRD) (ACOP HRD). On 23 August, he took over as the Flag Officer Commanding Western Fleet from Rear Admiral C. R. Praveen Nair. He led the Western Fleet during Operation Sindoor in the aftermath of the 2025 Pahalgam attack. Within 96 hours of the attack, Western Fleet ships deployed at sea and carried out firings of surface-to-surface & surface-to-air missiles and torpedoes on the western coast. The carrier battle group was led by INS Vikrant and had around 36 warships and submarines operating together. The Pakistani naval fleet was reported to have remained confined within Karachi Harbour, unable to respond effectively due to the fleet's overwhelming presence. The heightened risk even led to international commercial vessels re-routing to avoid the tense waters around Karachi. For his command of the fleet, he was awarded the Yudh Seva Medal in 2025. He relinquished command of the Western Fleet and handed over to Rear Admiral Vivek Dahiya on 27 September 2025.

On 1 October, he was promoted to the rank of vice admiral and appointed chief of staff of the Western Naval Command.

== Awards and decorations ==
Gokhale was awarded the Nao Sena Medal (Devotion to duty) in 2021 and the Yudh Seva Medal in 2025.

Yudh Seva Medal	Nao Sena Medal	Samanya Seva Medal	Operation Vijay Star
Operation Vijay Medal	Operation Parakram Medal	Sainya Seva Medal	75th Independence Anniversary Medal
50th Independence Anniversary Medal	30 Years Long Service Medal	20 Years Long Service Medal	9 Years Long Service Medal

== See also ==
- Flag Officer Commanding Western Fleet
- Western Fleet

Military offices
Preceded by K. A. Bopanna	Commanding officer INS Circars; 2020 – 2022	Succeeded by A. S. Dadwal
Preceded by Rajesh Dhankhar	Flag Officer Sea Training; 2022 – 2023	Succeeded by Susheel Menon
Preceded by C. R. Praveen Nair	Flag Officer Commanding Western Fleet; 2024 – 2025	Succeeded by Vivek Dahiya
Preceded by Ajay Kochhar	Chief of Staff; Western Naval Command; 2025 - Present	Incumbent
