= Vivek Dahiya (admiral) =

Indian Navy Admiral

Vice Admiral Vivek Dahiya NM
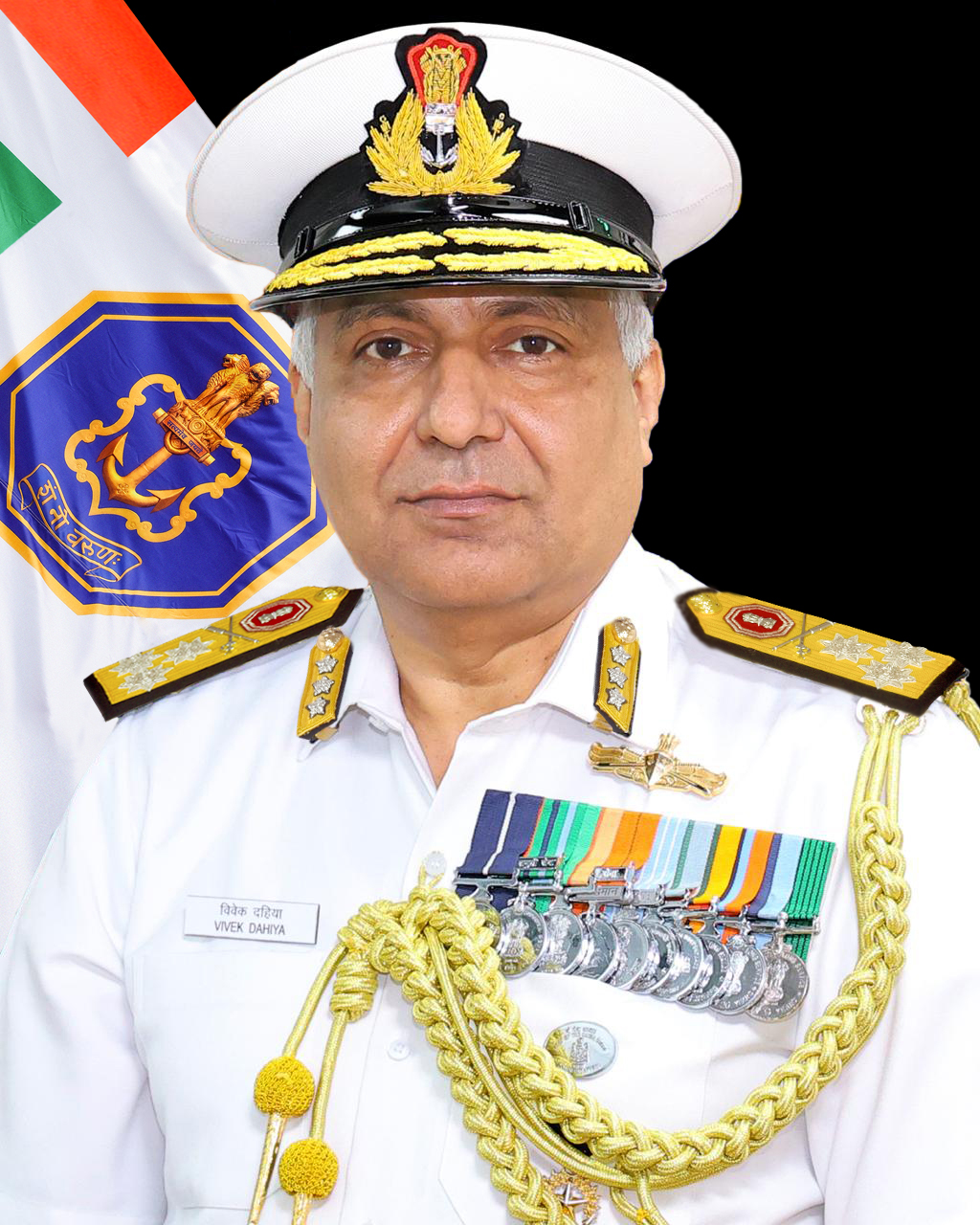
- Education: Indian Naval Academy
- Military career
- Allegiance: India
- Branch: Indian Navy
- Service years: 1 July 1993 – present
- Rank: Vice Admiral
- Commands: Western Fleet; INS Chennai (D65); INS Karmuk (P64)
- Awards: Nao Sena Medal

Vivek Dahiya, NM is a serving flag officer in the Indian Navy. He currently serves as the Director General Project Seabird. He earlier served as the Flag Officer Commanding Western Fleet.

== Naval career ==
Dahiya attended the Naval Academy, Goa and was commissioned into the Indian Navy on 1 July 1993. He later specialised in Navigation and Direction. He has served as the Navigating Officer of the Kora-class corvette INS Kora (P61), the Delhi-class destroyer INS Delhi (D61), the Godavari-class frigate INS Godavari (F20), the Delhi-class destroyer INS Mumbai (D62) and the aircraft carrier INS Viraat (R22).

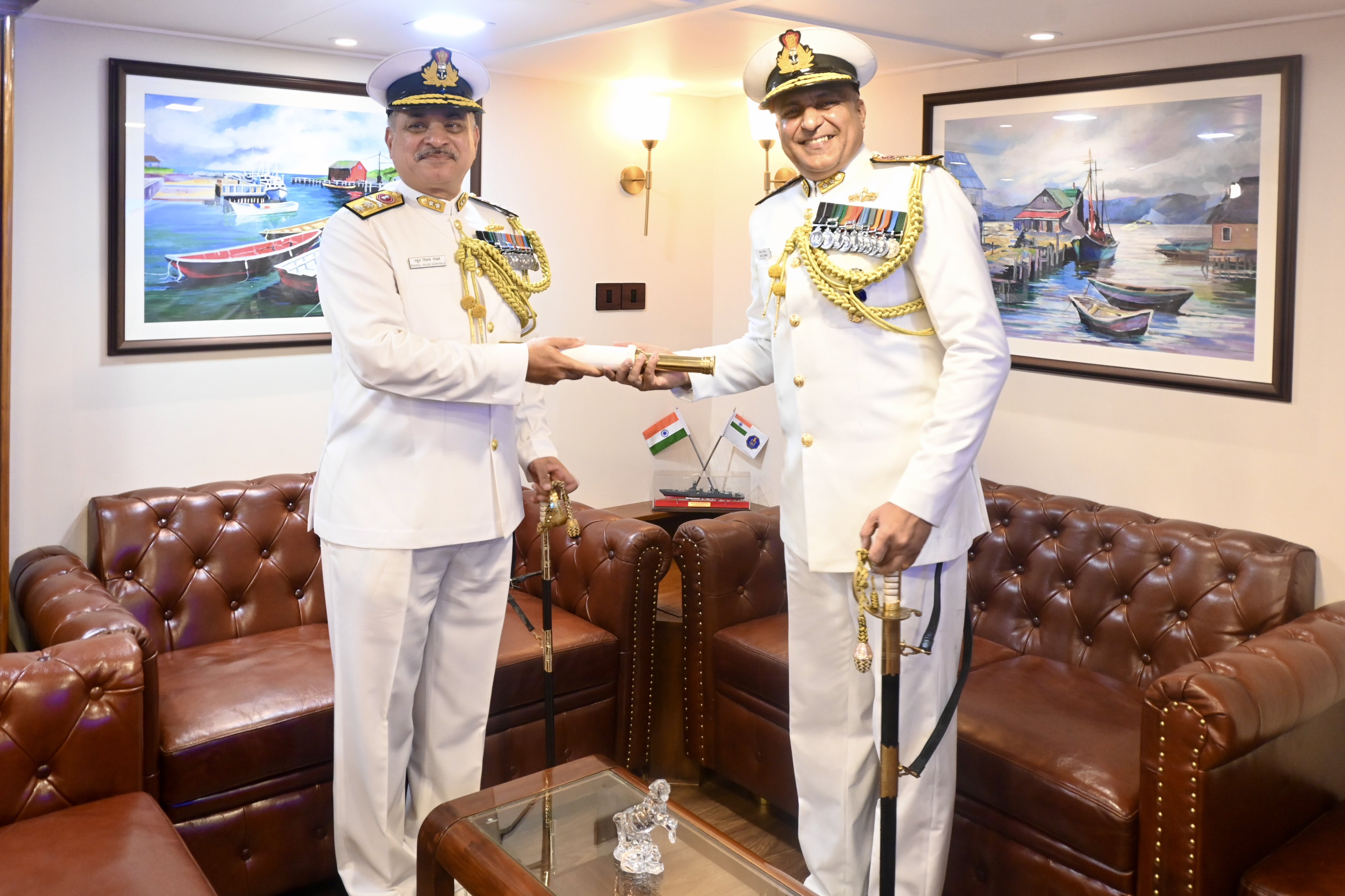
Rear Admiral Rahul Vilas Gokhale (left) hands over command of Western Fleet to Rear Admiral Dahiya

In 2005, Dahiya was selected to attend the Advanced Command and Staff Course at the Joint Services Command and Staff College (JSCSC), Shrivenham in the United Kingdom. He served in the Directorate of Operations at naval headquarters. He commanded the Kora-class corvette INS Karmuk (P64). As a commander, he served as the Fleet Navigation Officer (FNO) of the Western Fleet.

Dahiya attended the naval higher command course at Naval War College, Goa where he was awarded the FOC-in-C South Silver Medal. In April 2016, he took over as the Officer-in-charge of his alma mater, the Navigation and Direction School. He also served as the Command Plans Officer of the Eastern Naval Command as well as the Naval Assistant (NA) to the Flag Officer Commanding-in-Chief Eastern Naval Command.

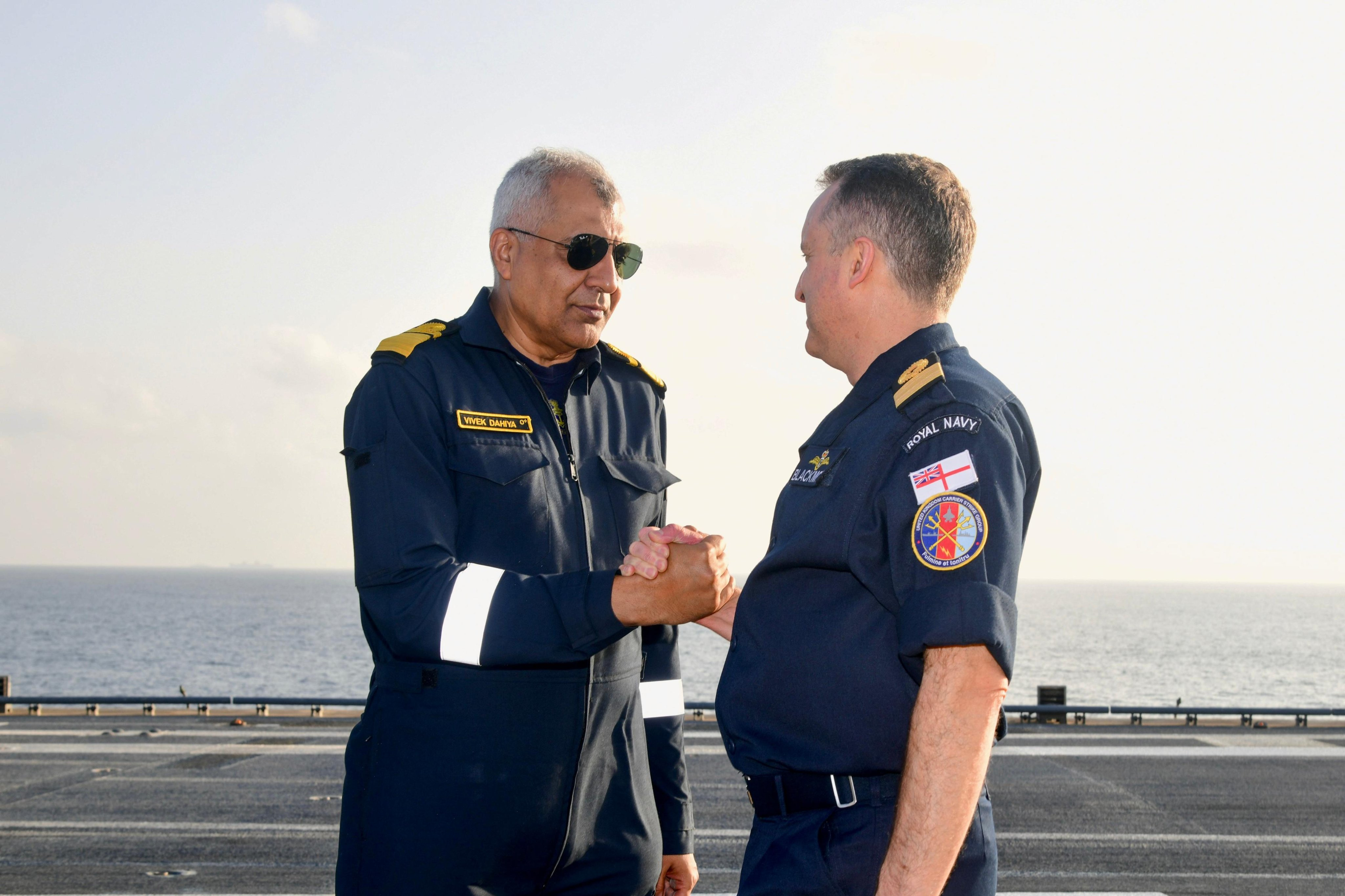
RAdm Dahiya with COMUKCSG Cmde James Blackmore during Exercise Konkan 2025.

In 2018, Dahiya was appointed commanding officer of the Kolkata-class guided-missile destroyer INS Chennai (D65). During his command tenure, Chennai was adjudged the Best Ship of the Western Fleet. As a Commodore, Dahiya served as the Commodore Workup at the Indian Naval Workup Team, and as the Chief Staff Officer to the Flag Officer Sea Training (FOST). FOST's charter includes the conduct of the operational sea training of all ships of the Indian Navy and the Indian Coast Guard. It also includes enhancing crew proficiency in all aspects, including safe navigation practices, damage control and firefighting drills, weapon firings as well as seamanship training.

In 2021, Dahiya was selected to attend the National Defence College. He also served as the Commodore (Staff Requirements) at NHQ.

=== Flag rank ===
Dahiya was promoted to flag rank in November 2023 and was appointed Assistant Chief of the Naval Staff (Staff Requirements) at NHQ. On 27 September 2025, he took command of the Western Fleet as the Flag Officer Commanding Western Fleet from Rear Admiral Rahul Vilas Gokhale. Within a week of taking over as FOCWF, he led the Western Fleet in Exercise Konkan, the biennial bilateral maritime exercise between the Indian Navy and the Royal Navy. He was promoted to the rank of Vice Admiral on 1 June 2026. He relinquished command of the Western Fleet on 29 July 2026, handing over to Rear Admiral Srinivas Maddula. On 1 August, he took over as the Director General Project Seabird in the rank of Vice Admiral.

== Awards and decorations ==
Dahiya was awarded the Nao Sena Medal (Devotion to duty) in 2024.

Nao Sena Medal	Samanya Seva Medal	Operation Parakram Medal	Sainya Seva Medal
Videsh Seva Medal	75th Independence Anniversary Medal	50th Independence Anniversary Medal	30 Years Long Service Medal
	20 Years Long Service Medal	9 Years Long Service Medal	

== See also ==
- Flag Officer Commanding Western Fleet
- Western Fleet

Military offices
Preceded by Rahul Vilas Gokhale	Flag Officer Commanding Western Fleet; 2025 – 2026	Succeeded by Srinivas Maddula
Preceded by Rajesh Dhankhar	Director General Project Seabird; 2026 – Present	Incumbent
