= Kirpal Singh (admiral) =

Indian Navy officer (1925–2021)

Rear Admiral Kirpal Singh AVSM
- Born: 5 September 1925; Beawar, Ajmer, Ajmer-Merwara, British India (now in Rajasthan)
- Died: 10 August 2021 (aged 95)
- Military career
- Allegiance: British India; India
- Branch: Royal Indian Navy; Indian Navy
- Service years: 1943–1977
- Rank: Rear-Admiral
- Commands: Western Fleet; INS Vikrant (1961)
- Conflicts: Second World War
- Awards: Ati Vishisht Seva Medal

Rear Admiral Kirpal Singh, AVSM (5 September 1925 – 10 August 2021) was a flag officer in the Indian Navy and founder of Dolphin Offshore Enterprises, one of India's first offshore technology firms. As a philanthropist, he formed the Dolphin Foundation, dedicated to providing grants and fellowships in the offshore and marine industry.

== Early life and education ==
Singh was born to Partap Singh and Laj Wanti, on 5 September 1925 in Beawar, in the district of Ajmer, Rajasthan. His father was a junior level Police Officer in the Opium Contraband Control Department during the British Raj. Singh grew up in very modest circumstances. In 1930, when Partap Singh retired prematurely at the age of 42, the family moved to Rawalpindi in North-West Punjab (now in Pakistan).

Singh received his early education at Khalsa High School in Rawalpindi. In 1939, he was selected for a scholarship to join the Indian Mercantile Marine Training Ship Dufferin at Bombay. Singh initially trained as a cadet for the Merchant Navy from 1940 to 1942, the first of many occasions when he was awarded an Extra First Class or First Class Certificate.

== Naval career ==
Japan's entry in the Second World War and its swift occupation of the Indian territory of the Andaman and Nicobar Islands abruptly changed Singh's career path.

=== World War II ===
Singh served as a midshipman during World War II on board the battleship, HMS Anson from January 1944 to June 1944, escorting Allied convoys from the Atlantic across the Arctic Ocean to Murmansk, Russia. Thereafter he was transferred to HMS King George V on board which he participated in military operations in the Mediterranean and the Dutch East Indies (now Indonesia). Later, as part of British Pacific Fleet, his ship survived the constant threat of the Japanese Kamikaze pilots in Okinawa. During his tenure on these battleships, Singh came into contact with his mentor, Admiral Bruce Fraser, 1st Baron Fraser of North Cape. He also benefited from programs for overseas officers organised by the Victoria League.

After the war, from September 1945 to March 1946, Singh attended technical courses as a Sub Lieutenant with the Royal Navy. A year later, he was sent to the UK to specialize in Gunnery at the Royal Navy's Gunnery School at HMS Excellent.

=== Post-Independence ===
In 1949, Singh served as Aide-de-camp (ADC) to the last Governor-General of India, C. Rajagopalachari at Rashtrapati Bhawan, the President's official address. During this formative time of India's Independence, he came in close contact with several of the nation's leaders like Vallabhbhai Patel and Jawaharlal Nehru.

Singh held many positions during his naval career. He commanded various ships and establishments, including the aircraft carrier INS Vikrant and the Western Fleet. On 28 March 1973, he was promoted to his final rank of rear admiral.

In April 2017, Singh attended the second reunion of the AsDC (Aides-de-Camp), hosted by President Pranab Mukherjee.

== Business career ==
Singh's post-naval career began with the establishment of a small ship repair firm with three other partners. He also represented Balfour Beatty Engineering Ltd in India. In early 1978, he met a senior general manager in the state owned Oil and Natural Gas Corporation (ONGC), which had discovered oil and gas at Bombay High. At the ONGC executive's suggestion, that India urgently needed to develop its underwater technology capabilities, Singh attended the Offshore Technology Conference (Houston) in May 1978. There he persuaded the business leadership of Taylor Diving and Salvage Co., a subsidiary of Brown and Root and the Halliburton group, to jointly bid for work on ONGC contracts. On 17 May 1979, Singh, along with Shavax Lal, with whom he had become acquainted during his tenure as C. Rajagopalachari's aide-de-camp, launched Dolphin Offshore Enterprises with the objective of providing supply vessels, diving and marine engineering services to India's nascent offshore oil and gas industry. In 1994, Dolphin Offshore Enterprises made its initial public offering. The company is listed on the Bombay and National Stock Exchange of India. Singh served as Chairman of Dolphin Offshore Enterprises.

== Philanthropy ==
Singh provided a grant for the launch of the Maritime Museum in Kochi. Through the Dolphin Foundation, he provided grants for individuals in the offshore and maritime industry in India. In 2006, he launched a scholarship program for the children of sailors in the Indian Navy. He and his wife Manjit Kirpal Singh were Trustees and Advisory board members of the Anad Foundation, dedicated to advancing the values of humanism through spiritual music. He was dedicating his time to launching a technical institute to train young Indians for the offshore energy and maritime industry.

== Personal life ==
Kirpal Singh married Manjit Kaur Dugal in New Delhi on 20 September 1953. She is the daughter of Uttam Singh Dugal and Balwant Kaur.

Kirpal and Manjit collaborated closely, and the Development Initiative For Self-reliance and Human Advancement (DISHA). She was the first Director of Finance for Dolphin Offshore. She recently resigned as a Director of the company, after serving on the Board for 32 years.

He died on 10 August 2021, at the age of 95.

Military offices
Preceded by Elenjikal Chandy Kuruvila	Commanding Officer INS Vikrant; 1969–1971	Succeeded by S L Sethi
Preceded by Elenjikal Chandy Kuruvila	Flag Officer Commanding Western Fleet; 1973–1973	Succeeded by Swaraj Parkash
