= Flag Officer Commanding Western Fleet =

Indian Naval appointment

Flag Officer Commanding Western Fleet (FOCWF)
- Flag of the FOCWF (Rear Admiral's flag)

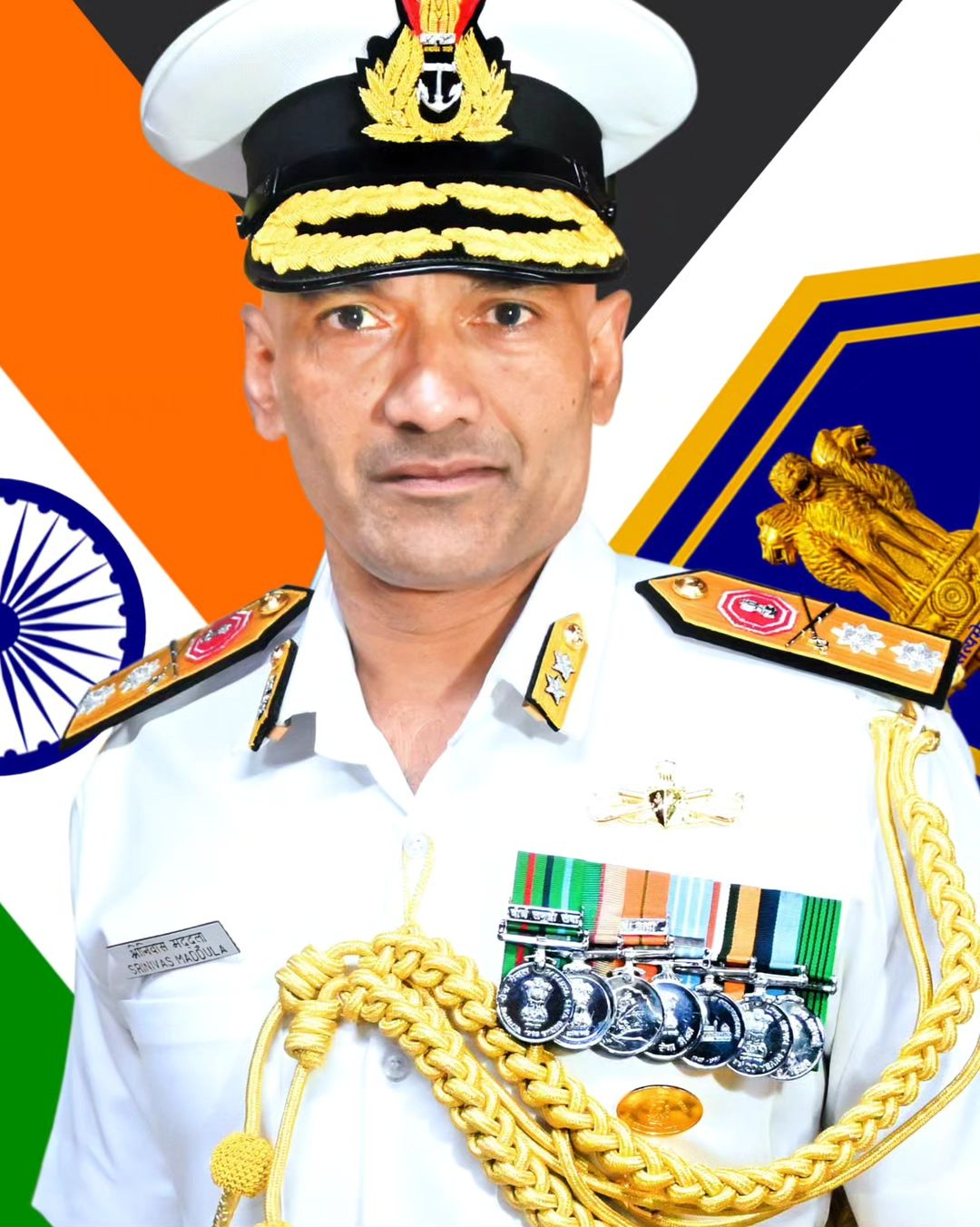
- Incumbent; Rear Admiral Srinivas Maddula VSM since 29 July 2026
- Indian Navy
- Abbreviation: FOCWF
- Reports to: Flag Officer Commanding-in-Chief Western Naval Command
- Seat: Mumbai
- First holder: Rear Admiral Sourendra Nath Kohli, PVSM (as FOCWF)

Flag Officer Commanding Western Fleet (FOCWF) is the title of the Indian Navy Officer who commands the Western Fleet, headquartered in Mumbai, Maharashtra. The FOCWF is a two star admiral holding the rank of Rear Admiral. The appointment is considered to be an important and a coveted one. The Current FOCWF is Rear Admiral Srinivas Maddula, who assumed office on 29 July 2026.

== History ==
After the independence and the partition of India on 15 August 1947, the ships and personnel of the Royal Indian Navy were divided between the Dominion of India and the Dominion of Pakistan. The Chief of the Royal Indian Navy was designated Flag officer Commanding Royal Indian Navy (FOCRIN). Serving under him was the Commodore Commanding Indian Naval Squadron (COMINS), the precursor to the Fleet Commander. In 1951, the appointment was upgraded to Two-star rank and was designated Rear Admiral Commanding Indian Naval Squadron (RACINS). In 1952, with the increase in number of naval vessels, the appointment was designated Flag Officer (Flotillas) Indian Fleet (FOFIF) and Flag Officer Commanding Indian Fleet (FOCIF) in 1957.

With the establishment of the Eastern Naval Command on 1 March 1968, the Indian Fleet was renamed as the Western Fleet and the Commander was designated Flag Officer Commanding Western Fleet (FOCWF).

The designations over time:

- 1947 – 1951 – Commodore Commanding Indian Naval Squadron (COMINS)
- 1951 – 1952 – Rear Admiral Commanding Indian Naval Squadron (RACINS)
- 1952 – 1957 – Flag Officer (Flotillas) Indian Fleet (FOFIF)
- 1957 – 1968 – Flag Officer Commanding Indian Fleet (FOCIF)
- 1968 – present – Flag Officer Commanding Western Fleet (FOCWF)

== Organisation ==
The FOCWF is assisted by the fleet staff, headed by the Fleet Operations Officer (FOO), a one-star appointment. The Fleet Communications & Electronic Warfare Officer (FCO), Fleet Gunnery Officer (FGO), Fleet Navigation Officer (FNO), Fleet Anti-Submarine Warfare Officer (FASWO), Fleet Nuclear, Biological and Chemical Damage Control Officer (FNBCDO), Fleet Armament Officer (FARMO), Fleet Naval Architecture Officer (FNAO), Fleet Medical Officer (FMO), Fleet Engineering Officer (FEO) and Fleet Electrical Officer (FLO) make up the rest of the fleet staff.

== List of Commanders ==
S.No.	Name	Assumed office	Left office	Notes
Commodore Commanding Indian Naval Squadron (COMINS)
1	Commodore John Talbot Savignac Hall CIE	August 1948	April 1949	
2	Commodore H. N. S. Brown	April 1949	16 March 1950	Seconded from the Royal Navy.
3	Commodore Geoffrey Barnard CBE, DSO & Bar	16 March 1950	1 June 1951	Seconded from the Royal Navy, later promoted Vice Admiral.
Rear Admiral Commanding Indian Naval Squadron (RACINS)
4	Rear Admiral Geoffrey Barnard CBE, DSO & Bar	1 June 1951	4 October 1951	Seconded from the Royal Navy, later promoted Vice Admiral.
5	Rear Admiral N. V. Dickinson DSO & Bar, DSC	5 October 1951	30 April 1952	Seconded from the Royal Navy.
Flag Officer (Flotillas) Indian Fleet (FOFIF)
5	Rear Admiral N. V. Dickinson DSO & Bar, DSC	1 May 1952	26 November 1953	Seconded from the Royal Navy.
6	Rear Admiral F. A. Ballance	27 November 1953	19 April 1955	Seconded from the Royal Navy.
7	Rear Admiral Sir St John Tyrwhitt Bt, CB, DSO, DSC	20 April 1955	2 October 1956	Seconded from the Royal Navy, later promoted Admiral.
8	Rear Admiral Ram Dass Katari	2 October 1956	30 December 1957	First Indian flag officer and first Indian appointee. Later first Indian Chief of the Naval Staff.
Flag Officer Commanding Indian Fleet (FOCIF)
8	Rear Admiral Ram Dass Katari	30 December 1957	2 April 1958	Later First Indian Chief of the Naval Staff.
9	Rear Admiral Ajitendu Chakraverti	3 April 1958	16 April 1960	
10	Rear Admiral Bhaskar Sadashiv Soman	17 April 1960	22 May 1962	Later Chief of the Naval Staff.
11	Rear Admiral Adhar Kumar Chatterji	22 May 1962	7 January 1964	Later Chief of the Naval Staff.
12	Rear Admiral Benjamin Abraham Samson	8 January 1964	31 May 1966	Later Chief executive officer of Mazagon Dock Shipbuilders.
13	Rear Admiral Sardarilal Mathradas Nanda PVSM, AVSM	1 June 1966	20 December 1967	Later Chief of the Naval Staff, during the Indo-Pakistani War of 1971.
14	Rear Admiral Sourendra Nath Kohli PVSM, AVSM	21 December 1967	29 February 1968	Later Chief of the Naval Staff.
Flag Officer Commanding Western Fleet (FOCWF)
14	Rear Admiral Sourendra Nath Kohli PVSM, AVSM	1 March 1968	1 January 1969	Later Chief of the Naval Staff.
15	Rear Admiral V. A. Kamath PVSM	2 January 1969	2 November 1970	Later served as the First Director General of the Indian Coast Guard.
16	Rear Admiral Elenjikal Chandy Kuruvila PVSM, AVSM	2 November 1970	27 March 1973	Fleet Commander during the Indo-Pakistani War of 1971.
17	Rear Admiral Kirpal Singh PVSM, AVSM	March 1973	November 1973	Became a successful businessman after leaving the navy. Founded Dolphin Offshore Enterprises.
18	Rear Admiral Swaraj Parkash MVC, AVSM	November 1973	22 April 1974	Captain of INS Vikrant during the Indo-Pakistani War of 1971. Later Director General of the Indian Coast Guard.
19	Rear Admiral Nar Pati Datta AVSM	22 April 1974	9 October 1975	Later Deputy Chief of Naval Staff
20	Rear Admiral R. K. S. Ghandhi VrC	20 October 1975	2 March 1976	Also commanded the Eastern Fleet. Later Flag Officer Commanding-in-Chief Western Naval Command.
21	Rear Admiral M. R. Schunker	3 March 1976	2 February 1977	Later Flag Officer Commanding-in-Chief Eastern Naval Command.
22	Rear Admiral Manohar Prahlad Awati VrC	3 August 1977	4 March 1979	Later served as Commandant of the National Defence Academy and Flag Officer Commanding-in-Chief Western Naval Command
23	Rear Admiral Radhakrishna Hariram Tahiliani AVSM	4 March 1979	12 May 1980	Later Chief of the Naval Staff.
24	Rear Admiral Subimal Mookerjee AVSM	12 May 1980	30 May 1981	Later Vice Chief of the Naval Staff.
25	Rear Admiral Jayant Ganpat Nadkarni NM, VSM	30 May 1981	11 August 1982	Later Chief of the Naval Staff.
26	Rear Admiral K. K. Nayyar AVSM	11 August 1982	28 March 1983	Later Vice Chief of the Naval Staff.
27	Rear Admiral I. J. S. Khurana	28 March 1983	12 February 1985	Later Director General of the Indian Coast Guard.
28	Rear Admiral S. C. Chopra AVSM	12 February 1985	26 February 1986	Later Flag Officer Commanding-in-Chief Eastern Naval Command.
29	Rear Admiral Vijai Singh Shekhawat AVSM, VrC	26 February 1986	9 July 1987	Later Chief of the Naval Staff.
30	Rear Admiral KASZ Raju AVSM, NM	9 July 1987	7 March 1989	Later Flag Officer Commanding-in-Chief Western Naval Command.
31	Rear Admiral Inderjit Bedi AVSM	7 March 1989	12 September 1990	Later Fortress Commander, Andaman and Nicobar Islands.
32	Rear Admiral K. K. Kohli AVSM	12 September 1990	31 October 1991	Later Director General of the Indian Coast Guard.
33	Rear Admiral A. R. Tandon AVSM	31 October 1991	8 October 1992	Later Flag Officer Commanding-in-Chief Western Naval Command.
34	Rear Admiral Madhvendra Singh AVSM	8 October 1992	11 January 1994	Later Chief of the Naval Staff.
35	Rear Admiral R. N. Ganesh AVSM, NM	11 January 1994	28 April 1995	Later Fortress Commander, Andaman and Nicobar Islands, Director General of the Indian Coast Guard and Flag Officer Commanding-in-Chief Southern Naval Command.
36	Rear Admiral John Colin De Silva AVSM	29 April 1995	18 September 1996	Later Vice Chief of the Naval Staff.
37	Rear Admiral Madan Jit Singh AVSM	19 September 1996	16 October 1997	Later Flag Officer Commanding-in-Chief Western Naval Command.
38	Rear Admiral Yashwant Prasad AVSM	17 October 1997	20 October 1998	Later Vice Chief of the Naval Staff.
39	Rear Admiral Sureesh Mehta AVSM	20 October 1998	1 April 2000	Later Chief of the Naval Staff.
40	Rear Admiral Sangram Singh Byce AVSM	1 April 2000	10 September 2001	Later Flag Officer Commanding-in-Chief Western Naval Command.
41	Rear Admiral Jagjit Singh Bedi AVSM, VSM	10 September 2001	15 January 2003	Later Flag Officer Commanding-in-Chief Western Naval Command.
42	Rear Admiral Vijay Shankar AVSM	15 January 2003	3 May 2004	Later Commander-in-Chief, Andaman and Nicobar Command and Commander-in-Chief, Strategic Forces Command.
43	Rear Admiral Pratap Singh Byce AVSM	3 May 2004	11 May 2005	
44	Rear Admiral R. F. Contractor AVSM, NM	11 May 2005	15 March 2006	Later Director General of the Indian Coast Guard.
45	Rear Admiral Anup Singh AVSM, NM	15 March 2006	13 March 2007	Later Flag Officer Commanding-in-Chief Eastern Naval Command.
46	Rear Admiral Shekhar Sinha NM & bar	14 March 2007	24 January 2008	Later Chief of Integrated Defence Staff and Later Flag Officer Commanding-in-Chief Western Naval Command.
47	Rear Admiral Anil Chopra AVSM	24 January 2008	27 November 2008	Later Flag Officer Commanding-in-Chief Eastern Naval Command and Flag Officer Commanding-in-Chief Western Naval Command.
48	Rear Admiral Surinder Pal Singh Cheema AVSM, NM	27 November 2008	31 August 2009	Later served as the Flag Officer Commanding-in-Chief Southern Naval Command, Commander-in-Chief, Strategic Forces Command, Chief Of Integrated Defence Staff and Flag Officer Commanding-in-Chief Western Naval Command.
49	Rear Admiral Rama Kant Pattanaik YSM	1 September 2009	17 January 2011	Later served as the Deputy Chief of the Naval Staff.
50	Rear Admiral Girish Luthra AVSM, VSM	18 January 2011	25 May 2012	Later Flag Officer Commanding-in-Chief Western Naval Command.
51	Rear Admiral Abhay Raghunath Karve AVSM	25 May 2012	15 August 2013	Later Flag Officer Commanding-in-Chief Southern Naval Command.
52	Rear Admiral Anil Kumar Chawla NM, VSM	15 August 2013	30 September 2014	Later Flag Officer Commanding-in-Chief Southern Naval Command.
53	Rear Admiral R. Hari Kumar VSM	1 October 2014	12 October 2015	Later Chief of the Naval Staff.
54	Rear Admiral Ravneet Singh NM	12 October 2015	15 October 2016	Later Deputy Chief of the Naval Staff.
55	Rear Admiral R. B. Pandit	15 October 2016	22 January 2018	Later Commander-in-Chief, Strategic Forces Command .
56	Rear Admiral M A Hampiholi AVSM, NM	22 January 2018	22 March 2019	Later Flag Officer Commanding-in-Chief Southern Naval Command.
57	Rear Admiral Sanjay Jasjit Singh NM	22 March 2019	14 February 2020	Later Flag Officer Commanding-in-Chief Western Naval Command.
58	Rear Admiral Krishna Swaminathan VSM	14 February 2020	24 February 2021	Current Chief of the Naval Staff.
59	Rear Admiral Ajay Kochhar NM	24 February 2021	27 December 2021	Current Vice Chief of the Naval Staff.
60	Rear Admiral Sameer Saxena NM	27 December 2021	15 November 2022	Current Flag Officer Commanding-in-Chief Southern Naval Command.
61	Rear Admiral Vineet McCarty	16 November 2022	10 November 2023	Current Commander-in-Chief, Andaman and Nicobar Command.
62	Rear Admiral C. R. Praveen Nair NM	10 November 2023	23 August 2024	Current Controller of Personnel Services.
63	Rear Admiral Rahul Vilas Gokhale YSM, NM	23 August 2024	27 September 2025	Current Chief of Staff, Western Naval Command.
64	Rear Admiral Vivek Dahiya NM	27 September 2025	27 July 2026	Current Director General Project Seabird
65	Rear Admiral Srinivas Maddula VSM	27 July 2026	Present	Current FOCWF.

== See also ==
- Western Fleet
- Flag Officer Commanding Eastern Fleet
