= Vivek Dahiya =

Vivek Dahiya may refer to:

- Vivek Dahiya (admiral), Rear Admiral in the Indian Navy
- Vivek Dahiya (actor), Indian television actor
