= Rajesh Dhankhar =

Indian Navy Admiral

Vice Admiral Rajesh Dhankhar AVSM, NM
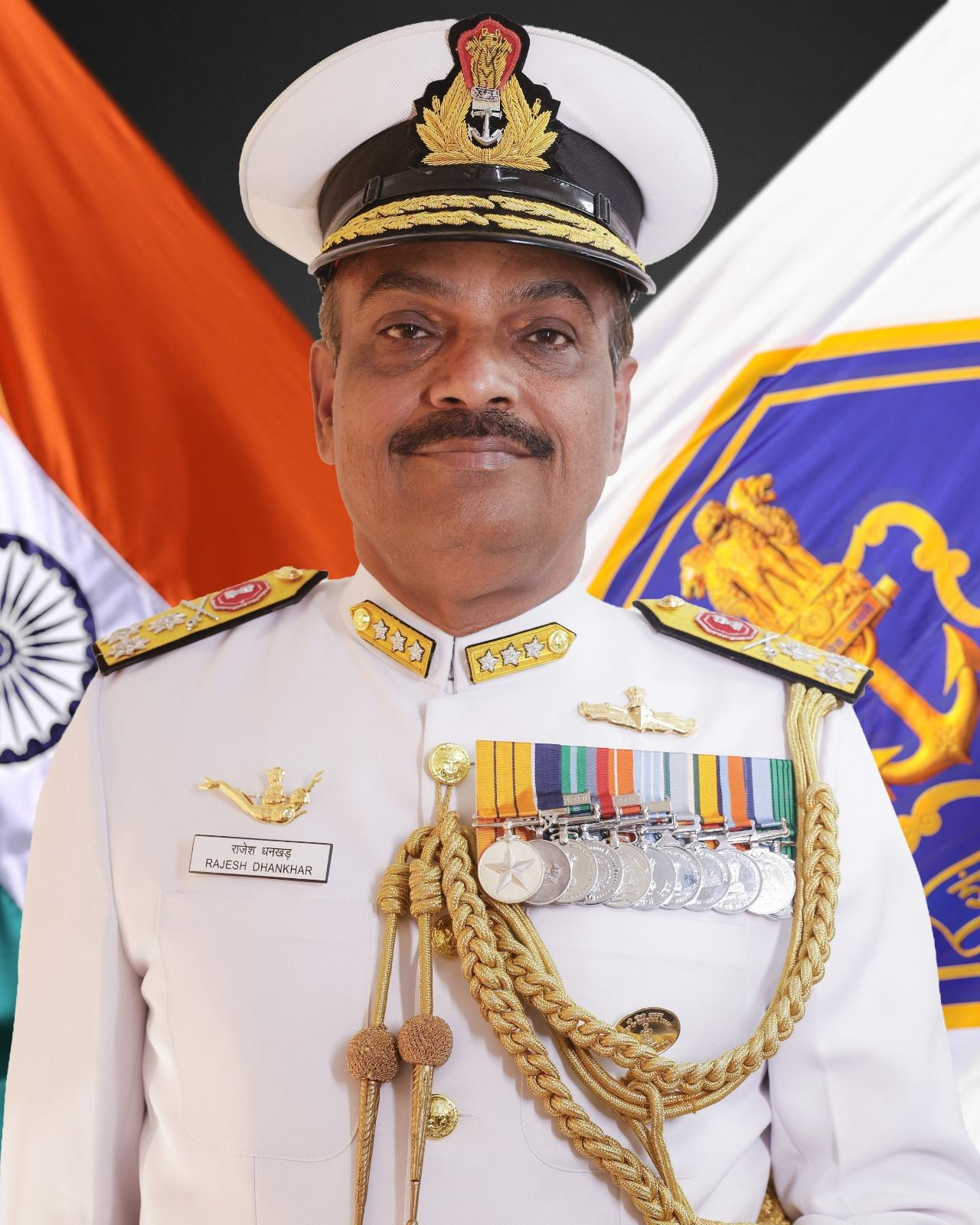
- Education: Indian Naval Academy
- Military career
- Allegiance: India
- Branch: Indian Navy
- Service years: 1 July 1990 – present
- Rank: Vice Admiral
- Commands: Project Seabird; Eastern Fleet; INS Vikramaditya (R33); INS Mumbai (D62); INS Gharial (L23)
- Awards: Ati Vishisht Seva Medal; Nao Sena Medal

Vice Admiral Rajesh Dhankhar, AVSM, NM is a serving Flag officer in the Indian Navy. He currently serves as the Deputy Chief of the Integrated Defence Staff (Doctrine, Organisation & Training). He earlier served as the Director General Project Seabird, Flag Officer Commanding Eastern Fleet, Commandant of the Naval War College, Goa, Flag Officer Sea Training and commanded the aircraft carrier INS Vikramaditya (R33) from 2019 to 2020.

== Naval career ==
Dhankhar was commissioned into the Indian Navy on 1 July 1990. He is a specialist in Navigation and Direction. He spent his early years onboard frontline warships as the navigating and operations officer. He has served as an instructor at the Project 15 training team in Mumbai. He attended the Defence Services Staff College, Wellington. He also served as an instructor at the Mids Wing of the Officer Cadet School in Singapore and at the Navigation and Direction School in Kochi.

Dhankar commanded the Magar-class amphibious warfare vessel INS Gharial (L23). In 2011, he attended the Higher Command Course at the Japan Maritime Self Defense Force Command and Staff College in Tokyo. He served as the executive officer and the principal warfare officer of the lead ship of her class of guided missile destroyers INS Delhi (D61).

He then commanded Delhi's sister ship INS Mumbai (D62). Mumbai was deployed as part of Operation Raahat to provide protection and support to Indian ships and aircraft involved in the evacuation of Indian citizens from Yemen during the Saudi-led military intervention. For this operation, he was awarded the Nao Sena Medal for gallantry. As a staff officer, he served in the Directorate of Naval Plans at Naval headquarters. In September 2019, Dhankar took over as the 5th commanding officer of the aircraft carrier INS Vikramaditya (R33). He subsequently served as the Principal Director of Personnel at NHQ, in the rank of commodore.

=== Flag rank ===
Dhankar was promoted to flag rank in February 2021 and was appointed Chief Staff Officer (Training) (CSO (Trg)) at the Southern Naval Command headquarters in Kochi. After a short stint, he took over as the Flag Officer Sea Training (FOST) also at Kochi. As FOST, his charter included the conduct of the operational sea training of all ships of the Indian Navy and the Indian Coast Guard. On 18 May 2022, he was appointed Commandant of the Naval War College, Goa. He took over from Rear Admiral Sai Venkat Raman. After an eighteen-month tenure, he was appointed Flag Officer Commanding Eastern Fleet. He took over from Rear Admiral Gurcharan Singh on 10 November 2023. He was succeeded by Rear Admiral Susheel Menon on 21 August 2024.

On 28 August 2024, after being promoted to the rank of vice admiral, he was appointed as the Director General Project Seabird, which is being undertaken at Karwar Naval Base at INS Kadamba. He took over from Vice Admiral Tarun Sobti. He was awarded the Ati Vishisht Seva Medal on 26 January 2025. He moved to the Integrated Defence Staff as the DCIDS (Doctrine, Organisation & Training) on 1 June 2026, succeeding Vice Admiral Vineet McCarty.

== Awards and decorations ==

Ati Vishisht Seva Medal	Nao Sena Medal	Samanya Seva Medal	Special Service Medal
Sainya Seva Medal	Videsh Seva Medal	75th Independence Anniversary Medal	50th Independence Anniversary Medal
30 Years Long Service Medal	20 Years Long Service Medal		9 Years Long Service Medal

== See also ==
- Flag Officer Sea Training

Military offices
Preceded by Puruvir Das	Commanding officer INS Vikramaditya; 2019 – 2020	Succeeded by C. R. Praveen Nair
Preceded by Rajesh Pendharkar	Flag Officer Sea Training; 2021 – 2022	Succeeded by Rahul Vilas Gokhale
Preceded by S. Venkat Raman	Commandant Naval War College, Goa; 2022 – 2023	Succeeded by Arjun Dev Nair
Preceded by Gurcharan Singh	Flag Officer Commanding Eastern Fleet; 2023 – 2024	Succeeded by Susheel Menon
Preceded by Tarun Sobti	Director General Project Seabird; 2024 – 2026	Succeeded by Vivek Dahiya
Preceded by Vineet McCarty	Deputy Chief of the Integrated Defence Staff (Doctrine, Organisation & Training); 2026 - Present	Incumbent
