= Srinivas Maddula =

Indian Navy Admiral

Rear Admiral Srinivas Maddula VSM
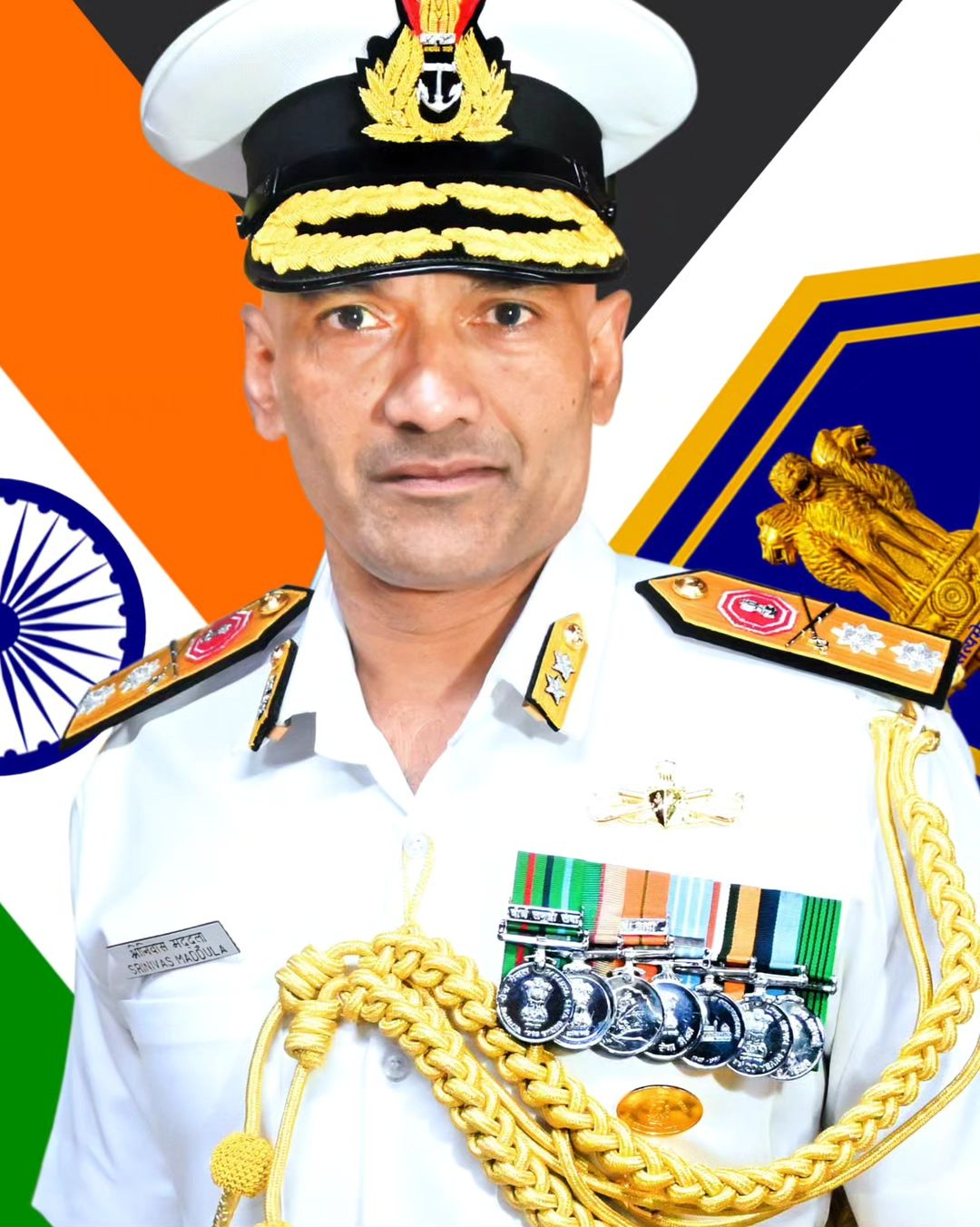
- Military career
- Allegiance: India
- Branch: Indian Navy
- Service years: 1993 – present
- Rank: Rear Admiral
- Commands: Western Fleet; INS Trikand (F51); INS Ganga (F22); INS Godavari (F20); INS Nipat (K86); INFAC T-80
- Awards: Vishisht Seva Medal

Rear Admiral Srinivas Maddula, VSM is a serving Flag officer in the Indian Navy. He currently serves as the Flag Officer Commanding Western Fleet. He earlier served as the Assistant Chief of Naval Staff (Foreign Cooperation and Intelligence) and as the Flag Officer Sea Training.

== Early life and education ==
Maddula grew up in Kolkata and Hyderabad and was schooled at the St. Xavier's Collegiate School and The Hyderabad Public School, Begumpet (HPS) respectively. He was part of the batch of 1989 at HPS. He then joined and graduated from the National Defence Academy, Khadakvasla.

== Naval career ==
Maddula was commissioned into the Indian Navy in Jan 1994. In June 1998, the Fast attack craft (FAC) T-80 was commissioned at Mumbai. It was built in collaboration with Israel Aerospace Industries and Goa Shipyard Limited. As a young lieutenant, Maddula was the commissioning commanding officer of the FAC.

Maddula attended the United States Marine Corps Command and Staff College at Quantico, USA where he completed the staff course. He commanded the Vidyut-class missile boat INS Nipat (K86), part of the 22nd Missile Vessel Squadron (Killer squadron). He later commanded the lead ship of the Godavari class of guided-missile frigates INS Godavari (F20), and her sister ship INS Ganga (F22).

Maddula attended the Naval War College, Goa, following which he tenanted the billet of Principal Director, Network Centric Operations at the Naval Headquarters, New Delhi. He was then appointed commanding officer of the Talwar-class stealth guided-missile frigate INS Trikand (F51). Under his command, Trikand participated in Exercise Cutlass Express in early 2019. The exercise is conducted in the Western Indian Ocean by the United States Naval Forces Europe and Africa. Maddula also commanded the Indian Navy's shore establishment INS Kadamba at Karwar.

Promoted to the rank of Commodore, Maddula moved to naval headquarters as Commodore (Intelligence). In this appointed, he headed the Directorate of Naval Intelligence, under the Assistant Chief of the Naval Staff (Foreign Cooperation and Intelligence). In April 2024, he represented India at the Maritime Security Conference at Bahrain. The conference was organised by the Combined Maritime Forces, Bahrain.

=== Flag rank ===
Maddula was promoted to flag rank in August 2024 and was appointed Flag Officer Sea Training (FOST) at Kochi. The FOST functions under the operational and administrative jurisdiction of Flag Officer Commanding-in-Chief Southern Naval Command. As FOST, his charter included the conduct of the operational sea training of all ships and submarines of the Indian Navy and the Indian Coast Guard. It includes enhancing crew proficiency in all aspects, including safe navigation practices, damage control and firefighting drills, weapon firings as well as seamanship training.

Maddula took over as the Assistant Chief of Naval Staff (Foreign Cooperation and Intelligence) in November 2025. As ACNS (FCI), he was responsible for foreign cooperation, intelligence, and diplomatic outreach. As a recognition of his distinguished service during his naval career, he was awarded the Vishisht Seva Medal on 26 January 2026. On 29 July 2026, Maddula took command of the Western Fleet as the Flag Officer Commanding Western Fleet from Vice Admiral Vivek Dahiya.

== Awards and decorations ==

Vishisht Seva Medal	Samanya Seva Medal	Operation Parakram Medal	Sainya Seva Medal
Videsh Seva Medal	75th Independence Anniversary Medal	50th Independence Anniversary Medal	30 Years Long Service Medal
20 Years Long Service Medal		9 Years Long Service Medal	

== See also ==
- Flag Officer Sea Training

Military offices
Preceded by Susheel Menon	Flag Officer Sea Training; 2024 - 2025	Succeeded by Vidhyadhar Harke
Preceded by Nirbhay Bapna	Assistant Chief of Naval Staff (Foreign Cooperation and Intelligence); 2025 - 2026	Succeeded by Sachin Reuben Sequeira
Preceded by Vivek Dahiya	Flag Officer Commanding Western Fleet; 2026 - Present	Incumbent
