= INS Circars =

Indian navy establishment

INS Circars
- Visakhapatnam in India
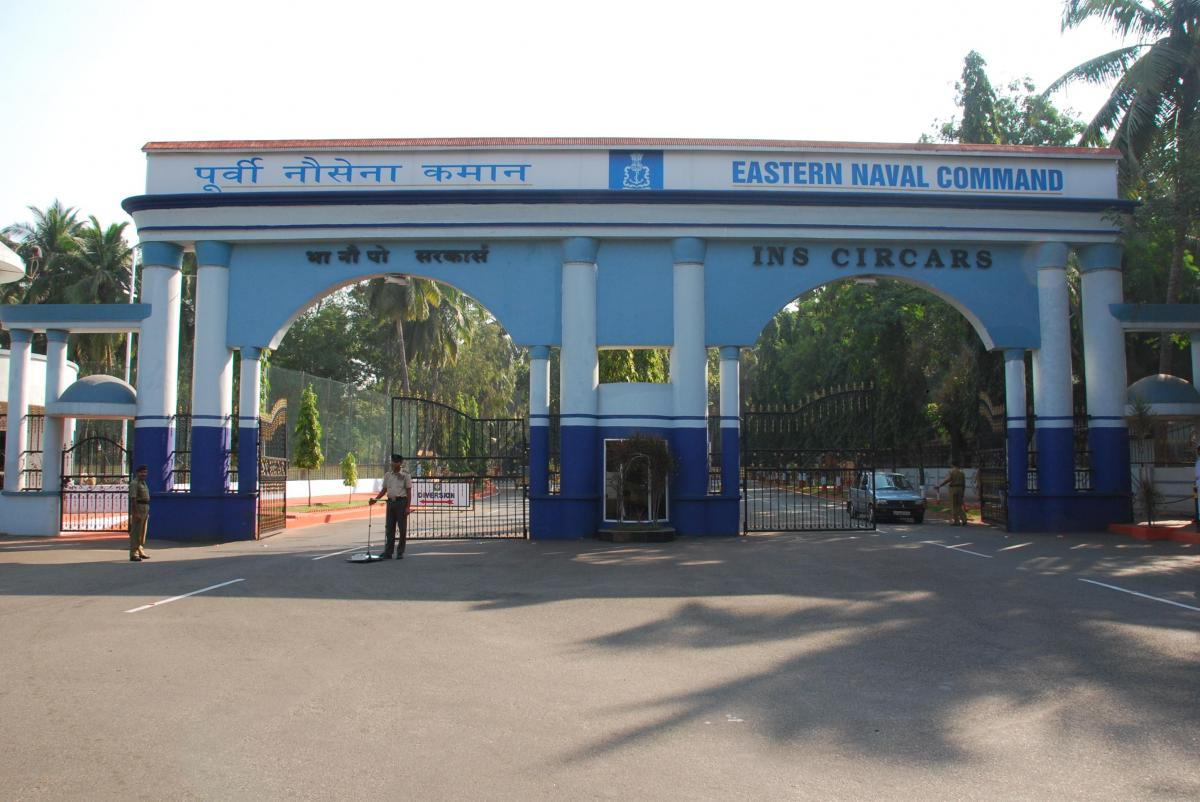
- INS Circars, the base depot ship of the Eastern Naval Command

Site information
- Type: Naval shore establishment
- Owner: Ministry of Defence
- Operator: Indian Navy
- Condition: Operational

Site history
- In use: 1939 – present

Garrison information
- Current commander: Commodore Commodore Kartik Murthy, VSM
- Past commanders: K. P. Gopal Rao

INS Circars is a naval base of the Indian Navy in Visakhapatnam. It is the shore-based logistics and administrative support establishment of the Eastern Naval Command. The stone frigate is also the base depot ship of the Command and is the oldest naval establishment on the Eastern seaboard.

== History ==
During the British Raj, Visakhapatnam was identified as an important convoy assembly point for military operations. Shortly after the outbreak of the Second World War, a small naval base was commissioned on 12 December 1939 as the seat of the Senior Naval Officer, Visakhapatnam. Lieutenant Commander H. E. Passmore, RN was the first SNO. On 12 April 1942, the base was converted into a refitting and operational establishment and christened HMIS Circars. Later that year, the establishment and the Visakhapatnam harbour were bombed by the Japanese. During the war, the base was used as an advance base and developed to meet the needs of the Fourteenth Army, and later for the Coastal Forces.

After the Partition of India, the Indian Navy was left without a sailors training establishment. A temporary training establishment was set up at HMIS Akbar in Mumbai before moving to Circars in December 1947. The base continued to be the primary sailor training establishment until 1980 when it moved to INS Chilka. Circars then became the base depot ship of the Eastern Naval Command.

== Today ==
The base today provides logistics and administrative support to 52 units with a strength of over 3500 personnel. It also provides accommodation facilities to sailors of Circars and additional units. Apart from this, it also caters to accommodation, mess facility and other logistics support of ships undergoing refit at the Hindustan Shipyard Limited and to cells formed prior to commissioning of ships on the East Coast. The commanding officer (CO) of the establishment is also the station commander of Visakhapatnam and is a one-star officer with the rank of Commodore.

== Crest ==
The crest of INS Circars has a naval anchor with a circle in the centre with white and green stripes.

== See also ==
- List of Indian Navy bases
- List of active Indian Navy ships
- Stone frigate

== Bibliography ==
- Singh, Rear Admiral Satyindra (1986), Under two ensigns: the Indian Navy, 1945–1950, Oxford & IBH Pub. Co., ISBN 978-8-120400-94-8
- Singh, Rear Admiral Satyindra (1992), Blueprint to Bluewater: the Indian Navy, 1951–65, Lancer International, ISBN 978-8-170621-48-5
- Hiranandani, Gulab Mohanlal (2000), Transition to Triumph: History of the Indian Navy, 1965–1975, Lancer Publishers LLC, ISBN 978-1-897829-72-1
