= Director General Project Seabird =

Senior appointment in the Indian Navy

- Flag of the DG Seabird (Vice Admiral's flag)

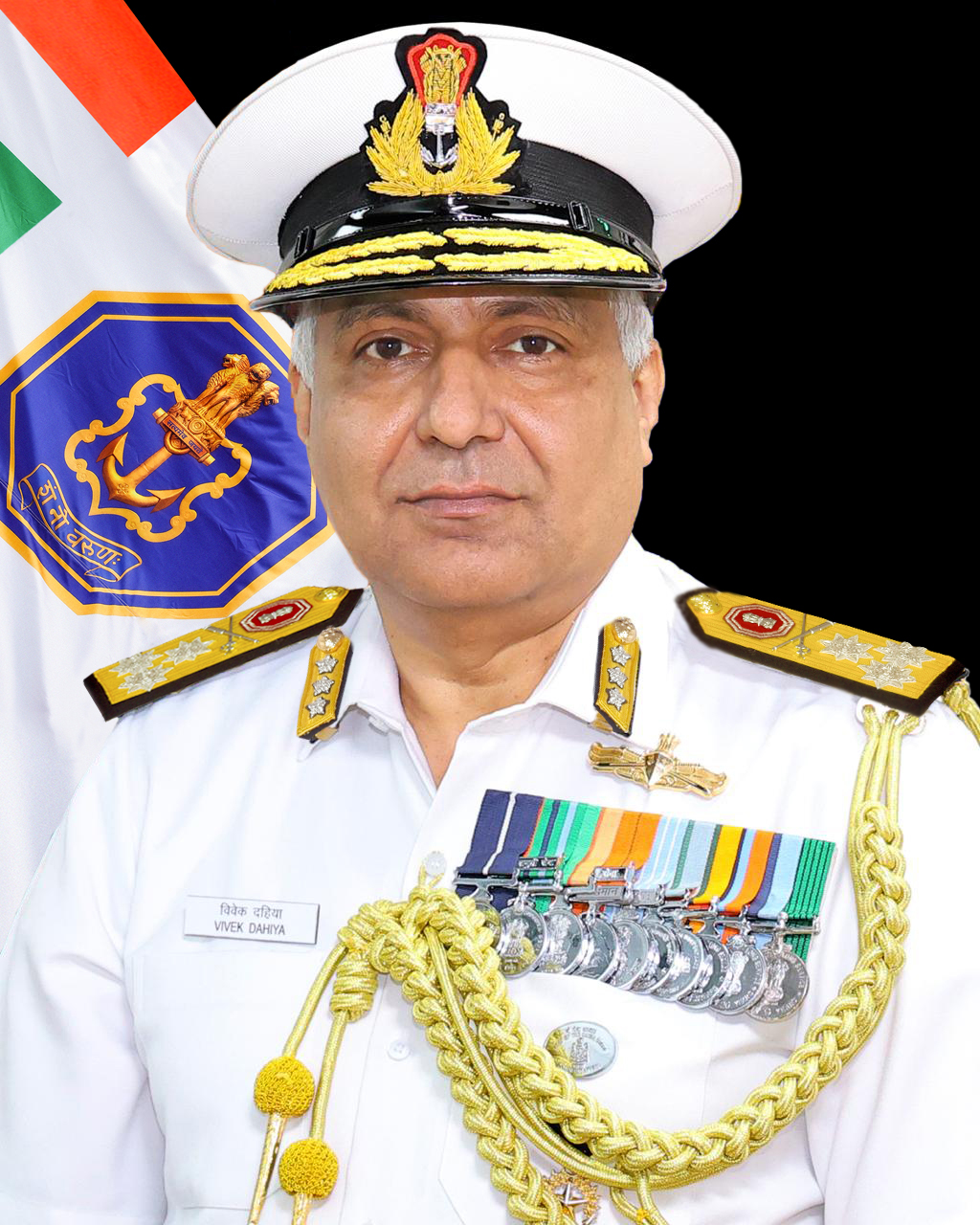
- Incumbent; Vice Admiral Vivek Dahiya NM
- Indian Navy
- Abbreviation: DG Seabird
- Reports to: Vice Chief of the Naval Staff
- Seat: New Delhi
- First holder: Rear Admiral S. K. Chand, AVSM

The Director General of Project Seabird (DG Seabird) is a senior appointment in the Indian Navy with the rank of Vice Admiral. The DG heads the Seabird Project with a charter to oversee the largest defence infrastructure project progressing at the Karwar Naval Base. The current DG is Vice Admiral Vivek Dahiya who took over on 1 August 2026.

== Background ==
In the early 1980s, then Chief of the Naval Staff Admiral Admiral Oscar Stanley Dawson conceived of a naval base sandwiched between the hills of the Western Ghats and the Arabian Sea near Karwar in Karnataka state. Located south of the naval bases in Mumbai and Goa and north of Kochi, the location had advantages as being very close to the world's busiest shipping route between the Persian Gulf and east Asia and out of range of most strike aircraft from neighbouring countries. It offered a natural deep-water harbour and significant land area for expansion, allowing larger aircraft carriers to berth. However, due to a variety of reasons, including the 1991 economic crisis, development was delayed.

=== Project Seabird ===
In 1999, following Pokhran-II, then Defence Minister George Fernandes approved Project Seabird to pursue the construction of the new naval base at Karwar. Larsen & Toubro was the lead contractor for the marine works on the harbour, in partnership with Hochtief, Ballast Nadem Dredging of the Netherlands, Radisson of Australia and Nedeco of The Netherlands. Over five km (3.1 mi) of breakwater was constructed using over 4.4 million cubic metres of rock to protect the harbour. The Binaga Bay was dredged and its rock outcrops blasted to allow even large aircraft carriers to turn inside the bay. Anjadip Island is one of the two islands to which the breakwaters are linked for reinforcement. A second channel will be added to the base to allow warships to simultaneously enter and exit the port .

== List of Directors General ==
Director General Project Seabird
S.No.	Name	Assumed office	Left office	Notes
1	Vice Admiral S. K. Chand, AVSM	19 March 1986 (Note: Appointed as rear admiral, promoted to the rank of vice admiral on 18 April 1990.)	24 August 1991	
2	Rear Admiral P. S. Das, UYSM	24 August 1991	1 October 1992	Later Flag Officer Commanding-in-Chief Eastern Naval Command.
3	Rear Admiral V. K. Malhotra, VSM	1 October 1992	31 October 1994	Later Flag Officer Commanding Maharashtra Naval Area
4	Rear Admiral M. Raman	31 October 1994	9 November 1995	
5	Rear Admiral O. P. Bansal	9 November 1995	15 November 1996	Later Flag Officer Commanding-in-Chief Eastern Naval Command.
6	Rear Admiral S. V. Gopalachari, AVSM, VSM	15 November 1996	13 October 1997	Later Deputy Chief of the Naval Staff.
7	Vice Admiral Raman Puri, PVSM, AVSM, VSM	13 October 1997 (Note: Appointed as rear admiral, promoted to the rank of vice admiral on 22 April 1998.)	9 March 1999	Later Flag Officer Commanding-in-Chief Eastern Naval Command and Chief of Integrated Defence Staff.
8	Rear Admiral S. R. Sampath Gopal, AVSM, NM	9 March 1999	30 April 2003	Earlier Flag Officer Commanding Eastern Fleet.
9	Rear Admiral K. Mohanrao	1 May 2003	31 December 2005	
10	Commodore P. C. Agrawal	1 January 2006	26 March 2006	
12	Vice Admiral Sanjeev Bhasin, AVSM, VSM	26 March 2006 (Note: Appointed as rear admiral, promoted to the rank of vice admiral on 1 November 2006.)	18 January 2007	Later Flag Officer Commanding-in-Chief Western Naval Command.
13	Rear Admiral B. R. Rao, NM, VSM			Later Chief Hydrographer to Government of India.
14	Rear Admiral A. R. Radhakrishnan			
15	Rear Admiral C. S. Murthy, NM			
16	Vice Admiral Karambir Singh, AVSM			Later Chief of the Naval Staff.
17	Vice Admiral Murlidhar Sadashiv Pawar, AVSM, VSM			Later Deputy Chief of the Naval Staff.
18	Vice Admiral Ravneet Singh, AVSM, NM			Later Deputy Chief of the Naval Staff.
19	Vice Admiral Srikant, AVSM	December 2019	December 2020	Earlier Commandant of the National Defence College.
20	Vice Admiral Puneet Kumar Bahl, AVSM, VSM	1 January 2021	24 December 2021	Later Commandant of Indian Naval Academy.
21	Vice Admiral Tarun Sobti, VSM	24 December 2021	1 October 2023	Later Deputy Chief of the Naval Staff.
22	Vice Admiral Rajesh Dhankhar, NM	28 August 2024	31 May 2026	Current Deputy Chief of Integrated Defence Staff (Doctrine, Organization & Training)
23	Vice Admiral Vivek Dahiya , NM	1 August 2026	Incumbent	Current DG Project SeaBird

== See also ==
- INS Kadamba
