= INS Delhi (D61) =

Indian warship

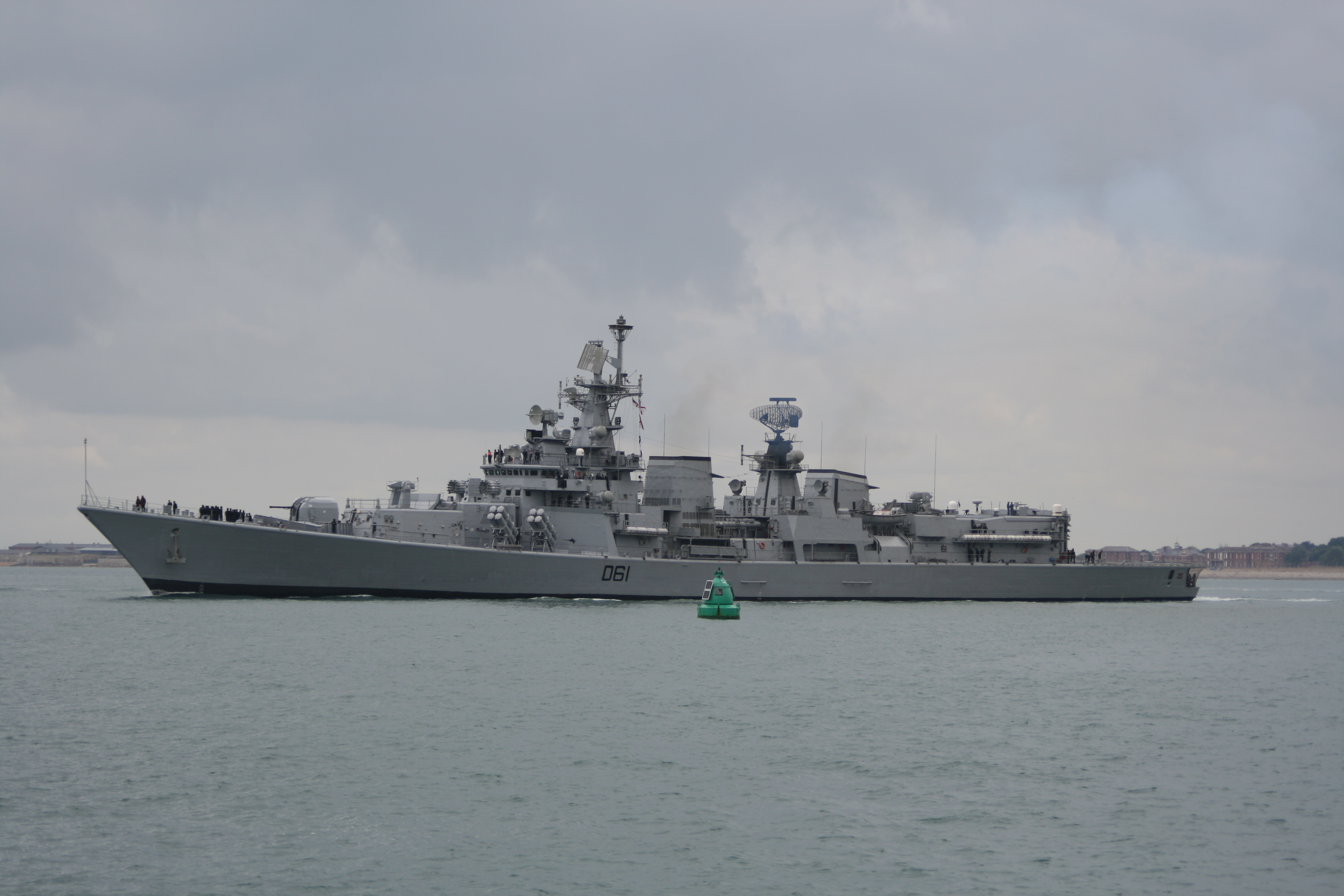
- INS Delhi

History
- Name: Delhi
- Namesake: Delhi
- Owner: Indian Navy
- Operator: Indian Navy
- Ordered: 20 March 1992
- Builder: Mazagon Dock Limited, India
- Laid down: 12 December 1992
- Launched: 20 March 1995
- Commissioned: 15 November 1997
- Identification: Pennant number: D61
- Status: Active
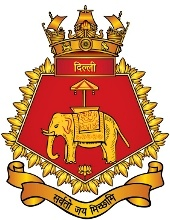
- Badge

General characteristics
- Class & type: Delhi-class guided-missile destroyer
- Displacement: 6,200 tonnes (full)
- Length: 163 m (535 ft)
- Beam: 17 m (56 ft)
- Draught: 6.5 m (21 ft)
- Propulsion: 4 × Zorya-Mashproekt DT-59 gas turbines 82,820 hp (61,760 kW); 2 shafts with cp props
- Speed: 32 knots (59 km/h; 37 mph)
- Range: 4,500 mi (7,200 km) at 18 knots (33 km/h; 21 mph)
- Complement: 350 (incl 40 officers)
- Sensors & processing systems: Fregat M2EM E-band air & surface search radar(300 Km) Replaced from MR-755 MAE.; BEL RAWL (Signaal LW08) D-band air search radar; 3 × MR-212/201 I-band navigation radars; 6 × MR-90 Orekh G-band fire-control radars (FCR); BEL Lynx U2 FCR Replaced from MR-184 I/J-band; 2 × EL/M-2221 FCR for Barak 1; BEL HUMVAD hull-mounted sonar
- Electronic warfare & decoys: BEL Ellora MK2 Replaced from BEL Ajanta Mk 2 ESM; Kavach (anti-missile system); Towed decoys
- Armament: 8 × BrahMos (Replaced from 16 × Kh-35E); 32 × Barak 1; 2 × Shtil SAM systems (48 missiles); 1 × OTO Melara 76 mm naval gun; Replaced AK-100; 2 × 30 mm AK-630M; 2 × RBU-6000 Launchers; Quintuple 533mm torpedo tubes; 2 rails of depth charges
- Aircraft carried: 2 × Sea King Mk 42B helicopters
- Aviation facilities: Helipad

INS Delhi is the lead ship of her class of guided-missile destroyers of the Indian Navy. She was built at the Mazagon Dock Limited in Mumbai and commissioned on 15 November 1997. This class is among the largest warships to be designed and built in India.

As of December 2021, Delhi was transferred to the Eastern Naval Command to replace the ageing Rajput-class destroyers and form the future Carrier Battle Group of INS Vikrant.

The ship completed its mid life upgrade in early 2022 and was back in service by April of the same year. She was back with new sensor upgrades and new 'Modular Launcher' for Brahmos Missile as a replacement for Kh 35E.

Delhi is the second vessel of the Indian Navy to bear the name. She inherits the mantle from the Leander-class cruiser of the same name, previously HMS Achilles of Battle of the River Plate fame.

The badge of INS Delhi contains an elephant carrying a 'howdah' carried from royal rides of Mughal Sulatnate rulers of India.

== Service history ==
During May–July 2009, INS Delhi led the Indian Navy task force on deployment to Europe. During this deployment, the task force participated in joint-exercises with the Royal Navy and the French Navy. Exercise Konkan-09 with the Royal Navy, was conducted off the coast of the United Kingdom. Exercise Varuna 2009 with the French Navy was off the coast of France.

As of 2020, Delhi was undergoing a mid-life refit that includes upgrades for several weapons and sensors. The Kh-35E Uran missiles has been replaced by BrahMos missiles, which was originally sanctioned in 2015. The Shtil-1 air defence system will replace the 9K-90 Uragan, with Fregat M2EM radar replacing the Fregat-MAE. The Kite Screech fire control system of the AK-100 is being replaced by BEL Lynx U2. The electronics warfare system will be upgraded to Ellora Mk II, with Kavach decoy launchers. Atlas Elektronik ACTAS towed-array sonar will also be installed. The BrahMos integration was validated with a test firing on 19 April 2022.

In May 2024, The INS Delhi along with INS Shakti (A57) and INS Kiltan (P30) was a part of the three-ship flotilla led by Rear admiral Rajesh Dhankar, the FOCEF. On 6 May 2024, the flotilla reached Singapore for a three-day visit as a part of operational deployment of the Navy's Eastern Fleet to the South China Sea. The flotilla will then proceed to Malaysia and Philippines, respectively. On 12 May, INS Delhi and INS Shakti reached Kota Kinabalu in Malaysia and will later participate in the Maritime Partnership Exercise with the Royal Malaysian Navy. On 20 May, INS Delhi, INS Kiltan and INS Shakti arrived at Manila, Philippines under the command of Rear Admiral Rajesh Dhankar. During the visit, the navies will take part in an exercise and other activities like "subject expert matter exchange, cross deck visits, cultural visits, collaborative community outreach programmes." On 23 May, the flotilla completed its visit to Philippines which was a part of the Operational Deployment of the Eastern fleet to the South China Sea.

The ship participated in Exercise Malabar 2024 which was held from 8 to 18 October.

INS Delhi took part in the Maritime Partnership Exercise (MPX) with the German Navy's Frigate Baden-Württemberg and Tanker Frankfurt am Main from 21 to 23 October 2024 in the Bay of Bengal and the Indian Ocean.

In July 2025, INS Delhi was again deployed in the South East Asia as part of the four-ship flotilla under the command of Rear admiral Susheel Menon, the FOCEF. The flotilla included INS Satpura (F48), INS Shakti (A57) and INS Kiltan (P30). The flotilla called on Singapore from 16 to 19 July. On 24 July, Delhi, Shakti and Kiltan called on Da Nang Port, Vietnam. The fleet was welcomed by the Vietnam People's Navy. On 1 August, the three ships arrived at Manila Port, Philippines. The ships also conducted the maiden joint sail and naval exercise with Philippine Navy on 3 and 4 August. The ships concluded their port call to Manila on 5 August.
