= Delhi-class destroyer =

Indian class of warships

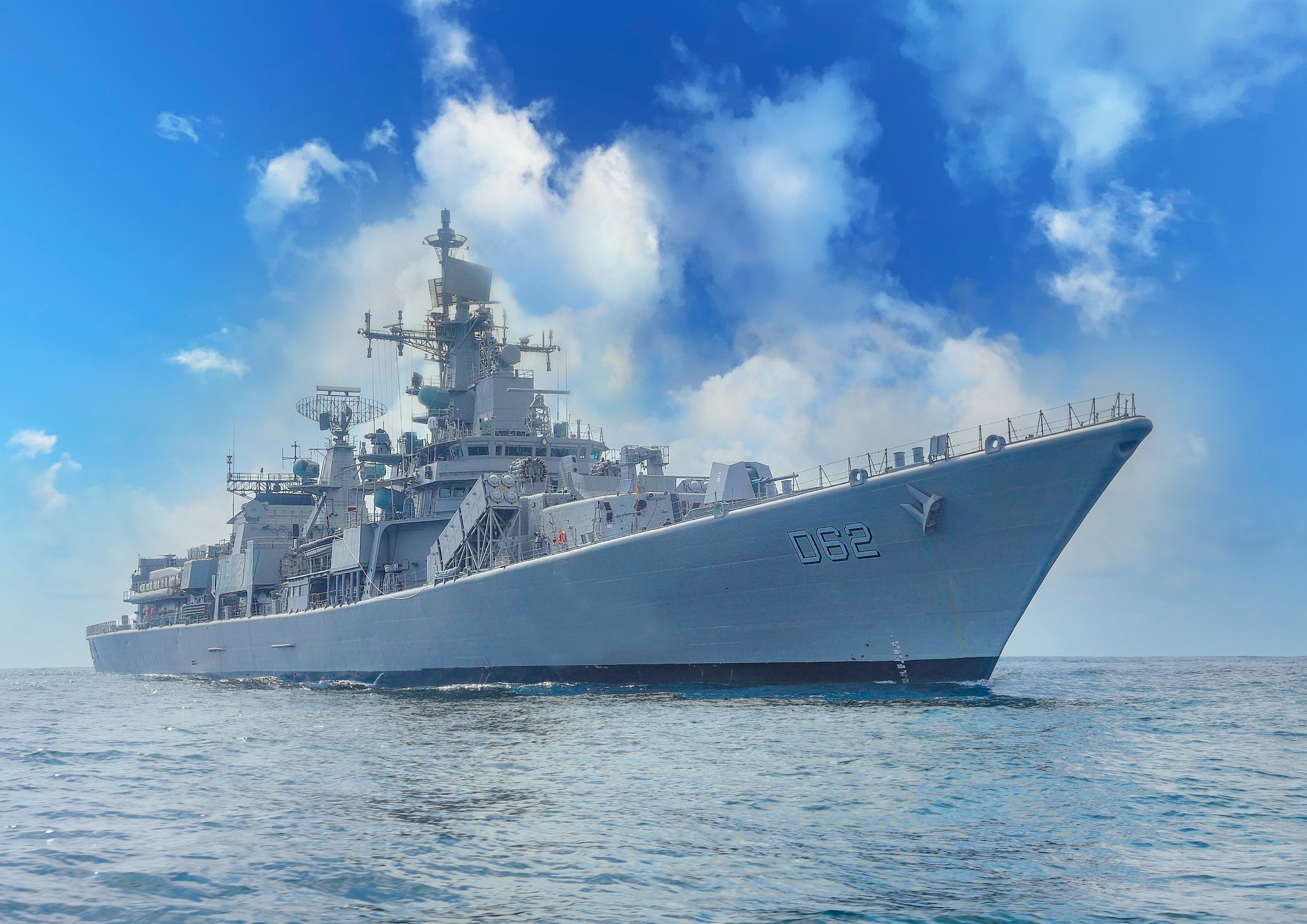
- INS Mumbai at sea

Class overview
- Name: Delhi class
- Builders: Mazagon Dock Limited
- Operators: Indian Navy
- Preceded by: Rajput class
- Succeeded by: Kolkata class
- Built: 1987–2001
- In commission: 1997–present
- Planned: 3
- Completed: 3
- Active: 3

General characteristics
- Type: Guided-missile destroyer
- Displacement: 6,200 tonnes (full)
- Length: 163 m (535 ft)
- Beam: 17 m (56 ft)
- Draught: 6.5 m (21 ft)
- Propulsion: 2 × Zorya-Mashproekt M36E propulsion plants with DT-59 gas turbines 82,820 hp (61,760 kW); 2 shafts with cp props
- Speed: 32 knots (59 km/h; 37 mph)
- Range: 4,500 mi (7,200 km) at 18 knots (33 km/h; 21 mph)
- Complement: 350 (incl 40 officers)
- Sensors & processing systems: MR-755-MAE Fregat E-band air and surface search radar; BEL RAWL (Signaal LW-08) D-band air search radar (INS Delhi, INS Mumbai); Indra (TASL) Lanza-N L-band air surveillance radar (INS Mysore, after refit); Fregat M2EM E-Band (After Mid Life Refit; to replace MR-755-MAE); 3 × MR-212/201 I-band navigation radars; 6 × MR-90 Orekh G-band fire-control FCR (for Shtil-1); MR-184 I/J-band FCR (INS Mysore; for AK-100); BEL Lynx U2 FCR (INS Delhi, INS Mumbai; for OTO Melara 76 mm); 2 × EL/M-2221 FCR (for Barak 1); 2 × MR-123-02 I/J-band FCR (for AK-630); Granit Garpun B FCR; BEL HUMVAD hull-mounted sonar (INS Delhi, INS Mysore); BEL HUMSA hull-mounted sonar (INS Mumbai); Thales Advanced Towed Array Sonar (INS Mumbai)
- Electronic warfare & decoys: BEL Ajanta Mk 2 ESM; BEL Ellora MK2 ESM(After Mid life Refit); Elettronica TQN-2 jammer; 2 PK2 chaff launchers; Kavach (anti-missile system) (After Mid life Refit); Towed decoys
- Armament: 8 × BrahMos (slant launchers) anti-ship missiles; 48 × Shtil-1 single-arm surface-to-air missile launchers forward & Aft.; 32 × Barak 1 point-defence surface-to-air missiles (VLS launched); 1 × OTO Melara 76 mm naval gun (replaced AK-100 naval gun); 2 × AK-630 CIWS; 2 × RBU-6000 rocket launchers; Quintuple 533mm torpedo tubes; 2 rails of depth charges
- Aircraft carried: 2 × Sea King Mk 42B helicopters

The Delhi-class destroyers, also known Project 15 are a class guided-missile destroyers of the Indian Navy. Three ships of this class are in active service. The Delhi-class vessels were the largest vessels to be built in India at the time of their commissioning. The ships were built by Mazagon Dock Limited (MDL) at a cost of ₹750 crore (equivalent to ₹35 billion or US$370 million in 2026) each.

== Development ==
The design and development of the ship class began as "Project 15" in 1980. Initially, the ships were planned to be follow-on frigates of the Godavari class with the addition of RBU-6000 ASW rocket launchers and gas turbine propulsion. A Soviet offer in 1983 for reversible gas turbines and modern weapon systems forced a redesign of the ships from 3,500-tonne frigates to 6,300-tonne destroyers. The Directorate of Naval Design completed the design around the mid 1980s. Model tests were carried out at SSPA, Sweden in 1985 and parallelly at Krylov Institute, Soviet Union in 1986. Severnoye Design Bureau provided design inputs for weapons and propulsion packages. The mutual interface suppression system for electromagnetic compatibility was supplied by the Soviets. The break-up of the Soviet Union affected the supply of weapon systems, contributing to a three-year delay in the construction of vessels.

== Design and description ==
The Delhi class has been described as a stretched Rajput class with some elements incorporated from Godavari-class frigates and Sovremennyy-class destroyers. The fore funnel is placed on the port side, while the aft funnel is placed on the starboard. The propulsion system consists of two Zorya-Mashproekt M36E gas turbine plants driving two controllable-pitch propellers. Each gas turbine plant comprises two DT-59 reversible gas turbines connected to an RG-54 gearbox in a combined gas and gas system and is placed in a separate engine room. The vessels are equipped for operation in a nuclear, biological and chemical warfare environment. Delhi-class vessels are fitted with flag facilities, enabling them to act as command unit in task groups. INS Mysore features better air conditioning facilities to correct heat dissipation issues encountered while operationalising INS Delhi.

=== Armament ===
For air defence role, Delhi class is fitted with 9K-90 Uragan (NATO: SA-N-7 Gadfly) air-defence system comprising a pair of 3S-90 single-arm launchers and 9M38M1 Shtil missiles. One launcher is installed forward of the bridge and the other atop the dual helicopter hangar. Each launcher carries a 24 missile magazine for a total of 48 rounds. The missiles have 35–40 kilometres (22–25 mi) range and feature semi-active radar homing. MR-775 Fregat-MAE (NATO: Half Plate) radar provides target designation and six MR-90/3R-90 Orekh (NATO: Front Dome) illuminators are used for fire control. The system can track twelve targets and engage a maximum of six tracked targets simultaneously. Last-ditch missile defence is provided by AK-630-based close-in weapon system. As of 2024, all three vessels of the class have been upgraded with an additional IAI/Rafael Barak 1 point defence missile system. Originally four AK-630 rotary cannons surrounding the aft mast, which are guided by two MR-123-02 (NATO: Bass Tilt) fire-control radars were installed but after Midlife Refit, the two AK-630 mounts ahead of the aft mast have each been replaced by pair of eight-cell Barak 1 vertical launch systems, for a total of 32 missiles. The missiles have a range of 10 km (6.2 mi) and use command line-of-sight guidance provided by a pair of EL/M-2221 fire-control radars that replace MR-123-02 fire-control radars on upgraded ships. A Signaal LW08 radar license produced by BEL as RAWL provides long range air search capability.

The surface missile battery of Delhi class includes 16 Kh-35E Uran missiles placed in four quadruple sloped launchers. The missiles feature active radar homing and are guided by a Granit Garpun B (NATO: Plank Shave) fire-control radar. They have a maximum range of 130 kilometres (81 mi) and are capable of sea skimming. The missile battery was initially intended to be eight 3M80E Moskit cruise missiles as evidenced by large blast deflectors present on the lead ship, INS Delhi. A single AK-100 gun guided by MR-184/MR-145 fire-control system (NATO: Kite Screech), which comprises T-91E radar and Kondensor electro-optical sights, was originally fitted to the ships. The three ships have replaced the 100mm guns with OTO Melara 76 mm naval gun during refits in the early 2020s.

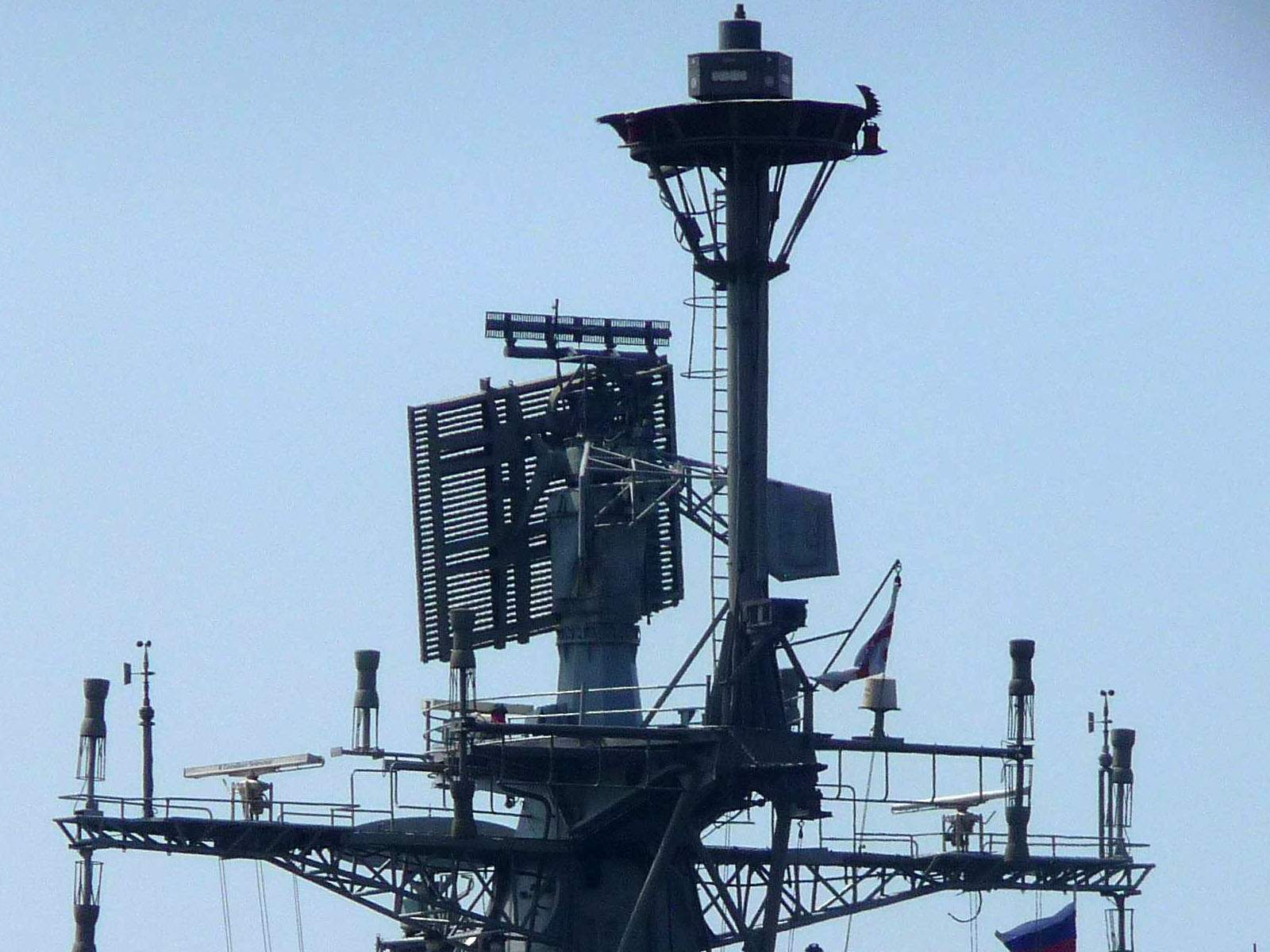
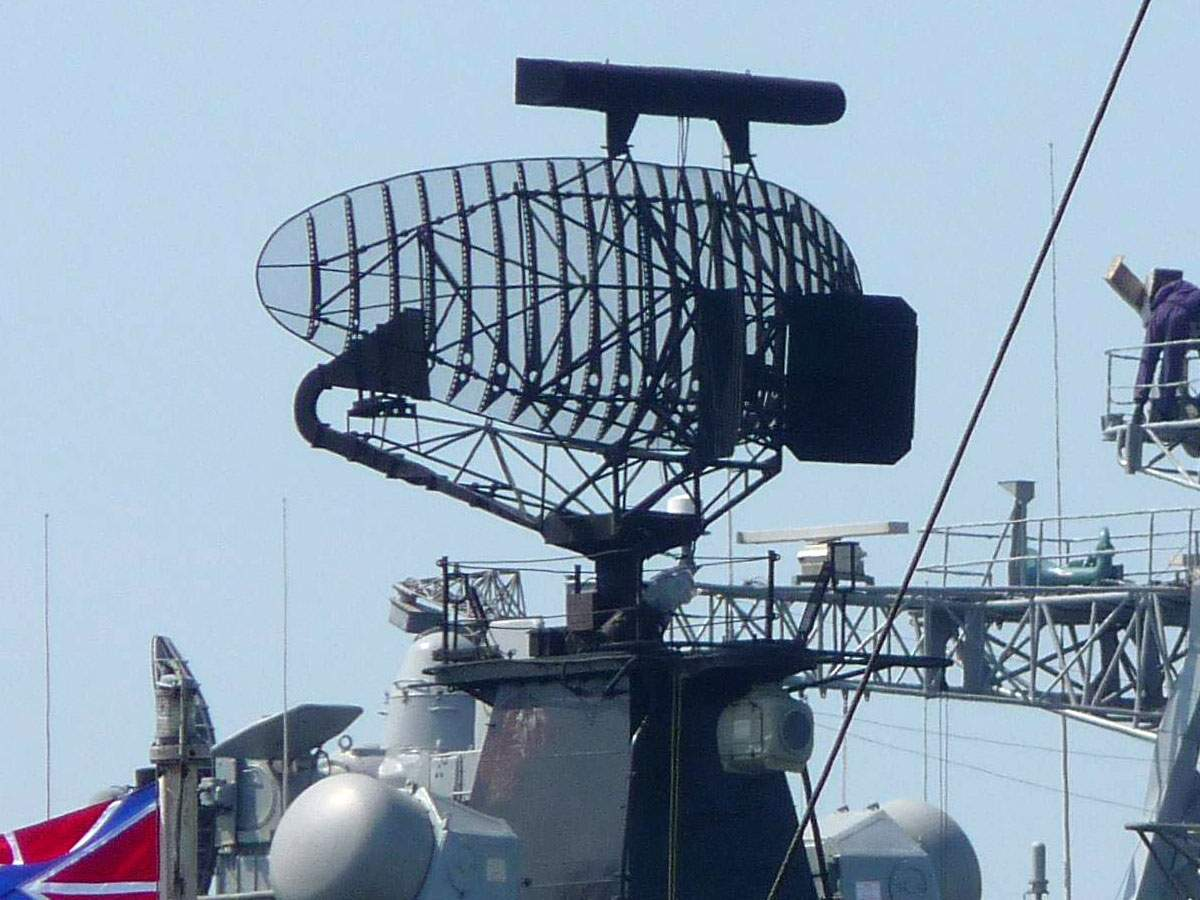
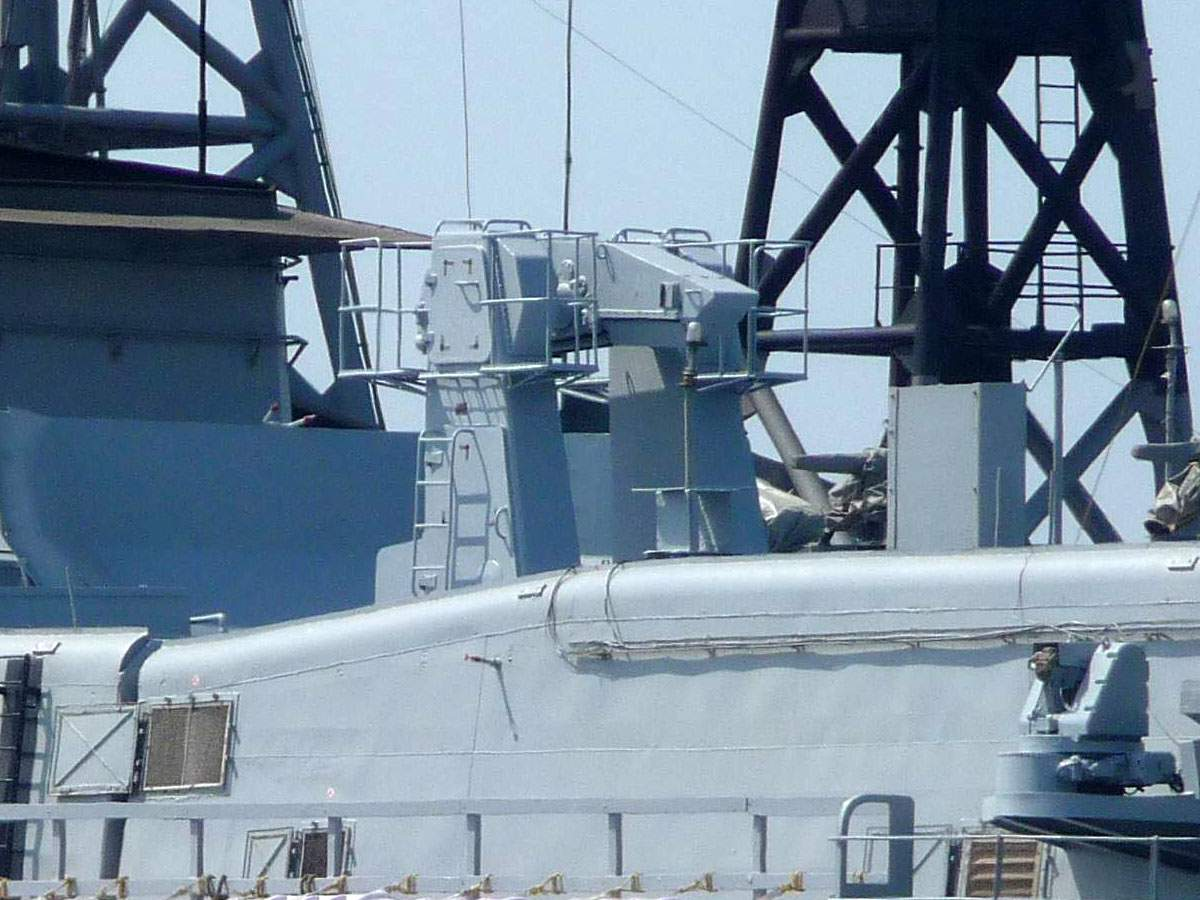
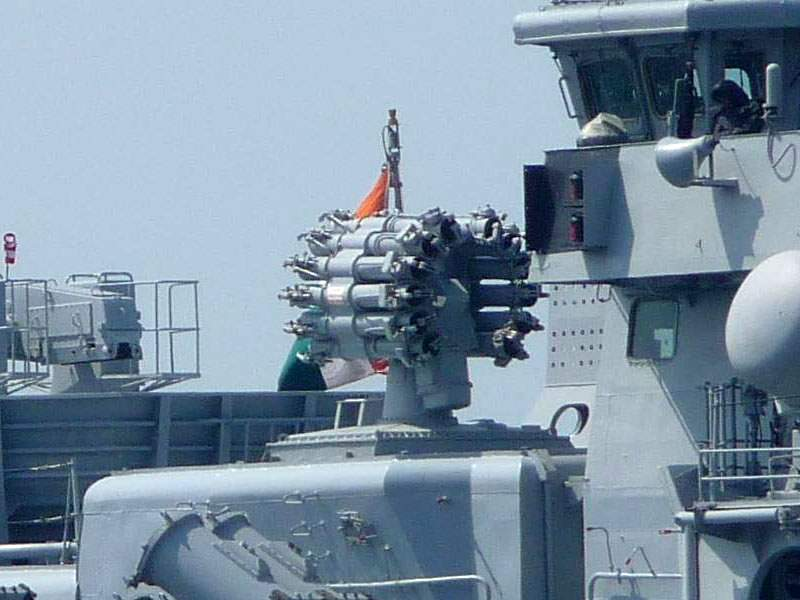
Weapons and sensors fitment on Delhi-class.
(top) Fregat-MAE E-band radar, BEL RAWL LW08, Shitil-1 SAM system, L&T RBU-6000 ASW rocket launcher.

A quintuple 533-millimetre (21 in) trainable torpedo launcher capable of firing SET 65E active/passive homing torpedo and Type 53–65 wake homing torpedo is placed in between the funnels. A pair of 12-tubed RBU-6000 213mm anti-submarine rocket launchers fitted in front of the bridge can engage submarines up to a range of 6 km (3.7 mi). Detection is provided by BEL HUMVAD, an indigenous hull-mounted sonar with a variable depth transducer that offers better performance in the waters around India. An Indal Model 15-750 handling system manufactured by GRSE is used to deploy the variable depth sonar of HUMVAD. The final ship of the class, INS Mumbai, is fitted with an improved ASW suite consisting of BEL HUMSA hull-mounted sonar and Thales ATAS towed array sonar.

The electronic warfare suite originally consisted of BEL Ajanta Mk 2 for electronic support measures, Elettronica TQN-2 jammer and two PK-2 chaff launchers of Russian origin. The Ajanta Mk 2 system was later replaced by Ellora, which has an additional capability to provide electronic countermeasures. BEL Shikari combat display and management system, a derivative of Italian IPN-10, integrates weapon systems of diverse origin. Each vessel can carry two Westland Sea King Mk 42B helicopters. The helicopters carry a surface search radar, a dipping sonar, A244-S lightweight torpedoes and Sea Eagle anti-ship missiles. Samahé helicopter handling system is fitted on all vessels.

=== Modernisation ===
In May 2015, the Defence Acquisition Council of the Indian Ministry of Defence cleared the procurement of nine systems of BrahMos cruise missiles to equip three of the Delhi-class destroyers as well as the first batch of Talwar-class frigates at a cost of ₹2,700 crore (equivalent to ₹44 billion or US$460 million in 2026).

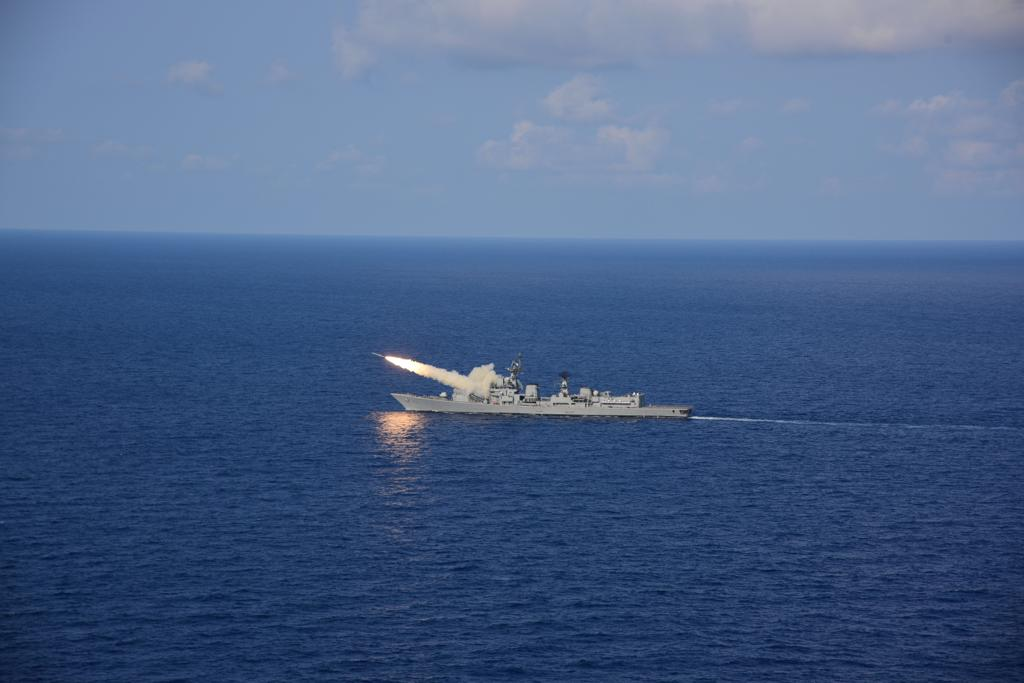
INS Delhi fires BrahMos missile

As of January 2024, INS Delhi (D61) and INS Mumbai (D62) has completed their mid-life refit that includes upgrades for several weapons and sensors. The Kh-35E Uran missiles has been replaced by BrahMos missiles, which was originally sanctioned in 2015 for two ships of this class. The primary radar has been replaced with Fregat M2EM radar from the older MR-755 Fregat-MAE. The AK-100 main gun has been replaced by OTO Melara 76 mm along with BEL Lynx U2 FCR. The electronics warfare system is upgraded to Ellora Mk II, with Kavach decoy launchers. Atlas Elektronik ACTAS towed-array sonar will be installed on all three ships. In April 2022, Brahmos missile was tested from INS Delhi with new modular slant launcher design.

=== Relocation ===
The Delhi-class destroyers will be re-based to the Eastern Naval Command, Visakhapatnam. Along with Nilgiri class, these will form a part of the carrier battle group of INS Vikrant. Mysore had reached its new base by December 2021 and was undergoing refit.

== Ships of the class ==
Name	Pennant	Builder	Laid Down	Launched	Commissioned	Homeport	Status
Delhi	D61	Mazagon Dock Limited	14 November 1987	1 February 1991	15 November 1997	Visakhapatnam	Active
Mysore	D60	Mazagon Dock Limited	2 February 1991	4 June 1993	2 June 1999	Visakhapatnam	Active
Mumbai	D62	Mazagon Dock Limited	14 December 1992	20 March 1995	22 January 2001	Visakhapatnam	Active

== Gallery ==
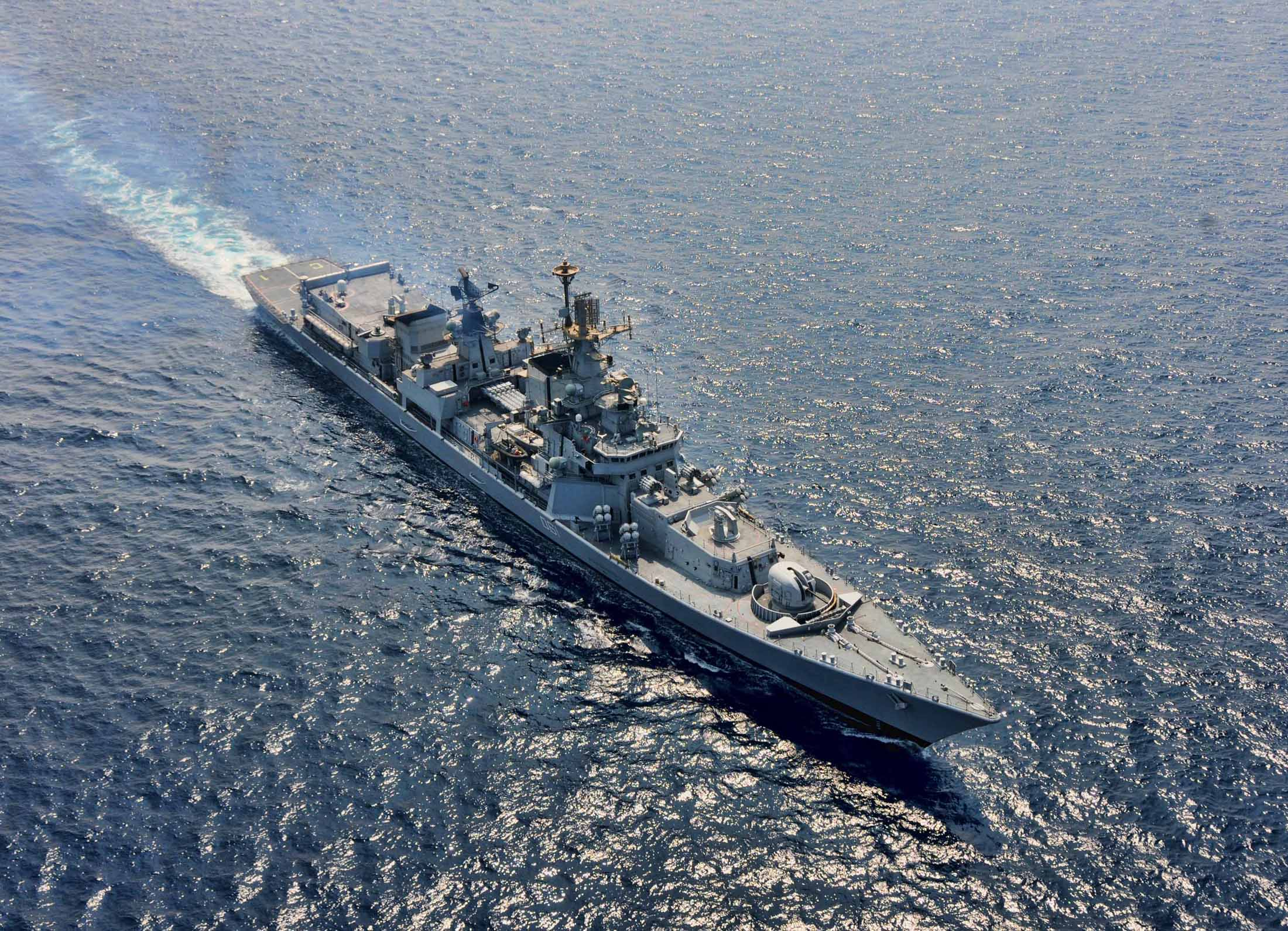
Delhi during Defence of Gujarat in 2013.

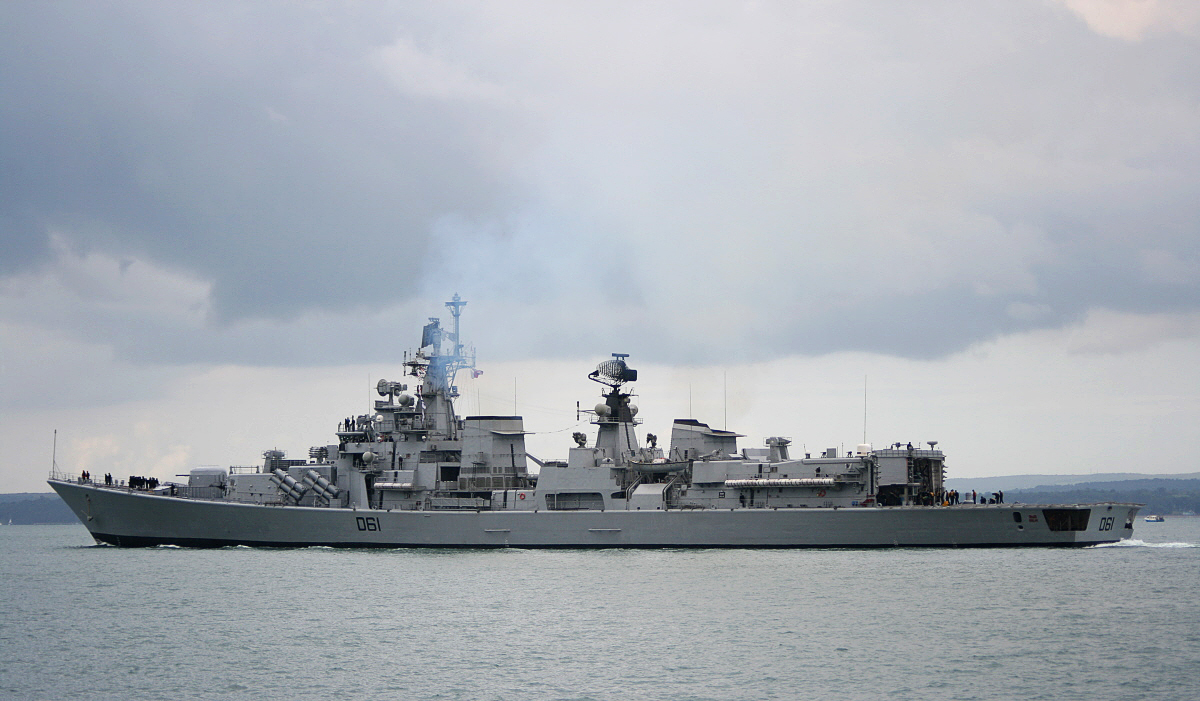
Delhi departing Portsmouth Naval Base, UK, 2009.

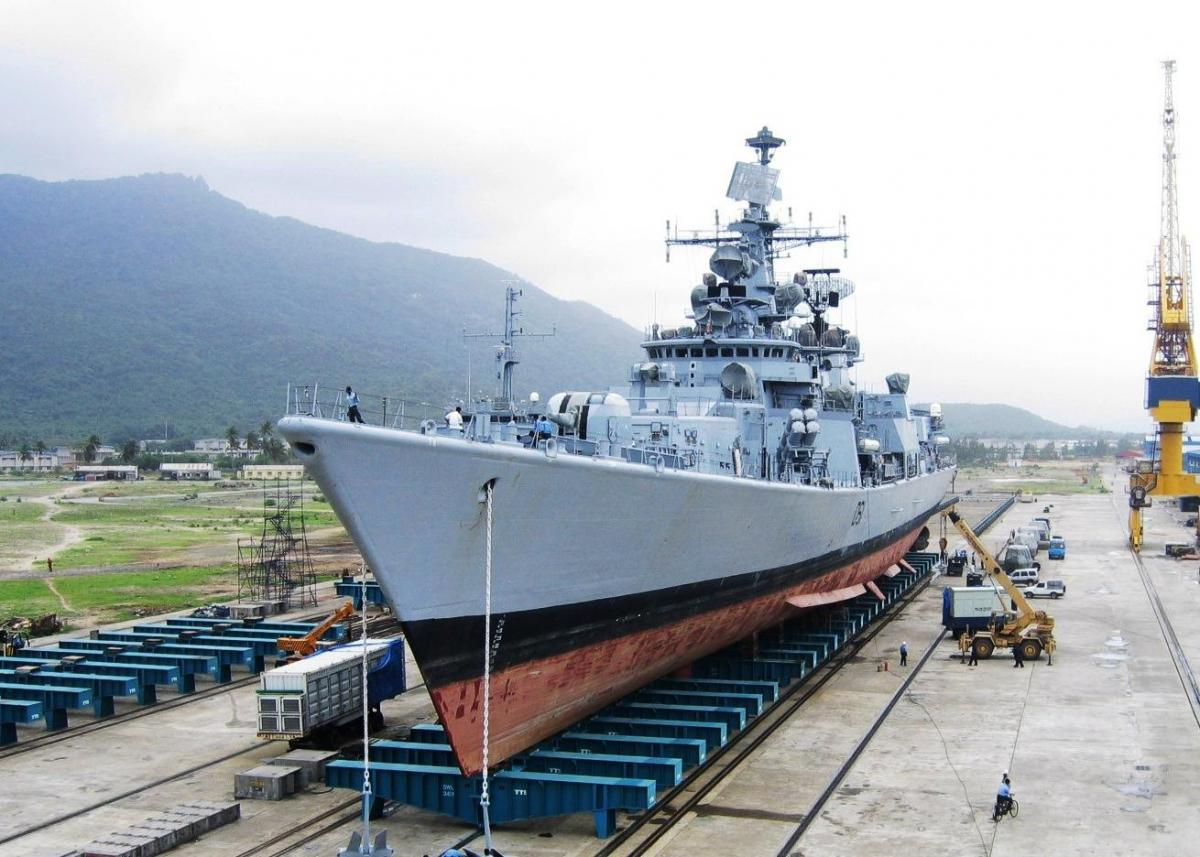
Delhi docked using the shiplift system at Naval Ship Repair Yard at INS Kadamba (Karwar).

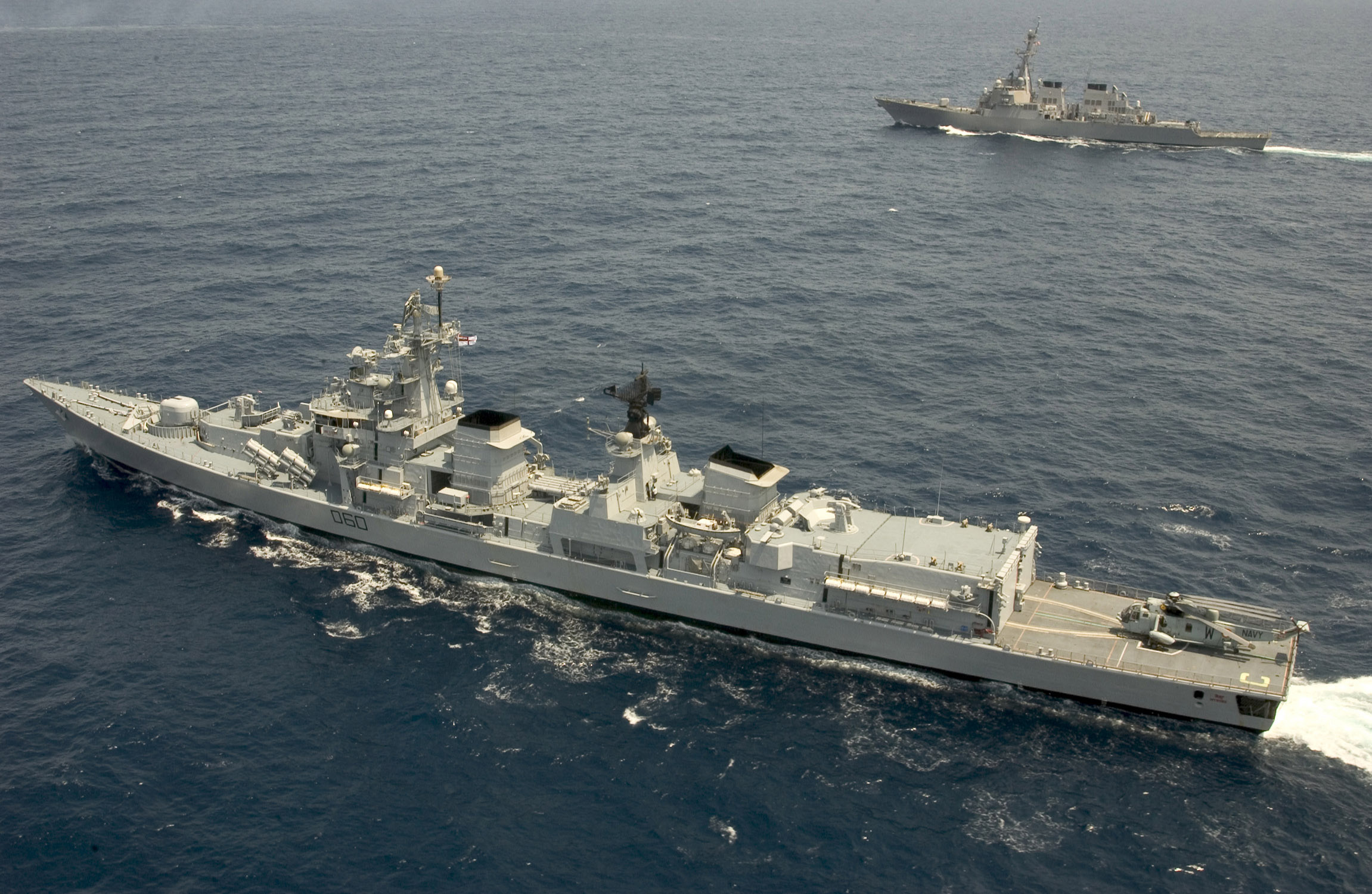
Mysore and USS Fitzgerald transit in formation during Malabar.

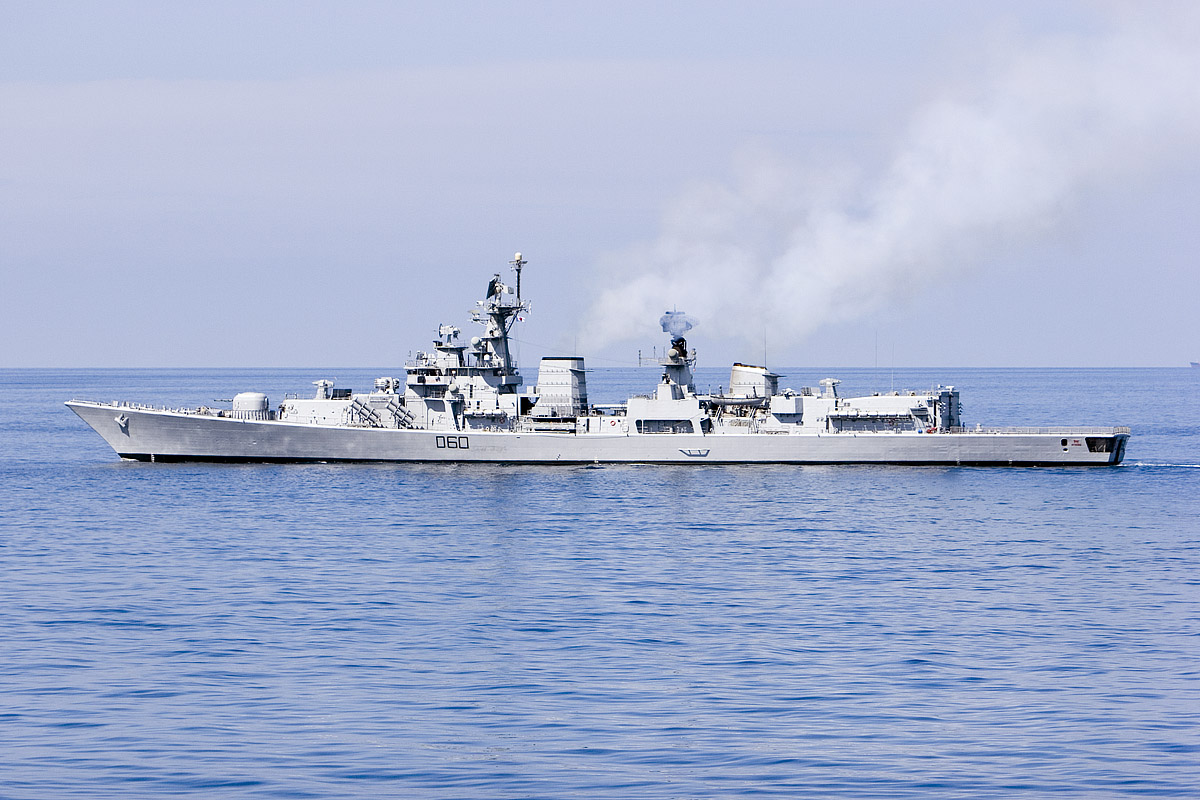
Mysore during IMDEX 2007.

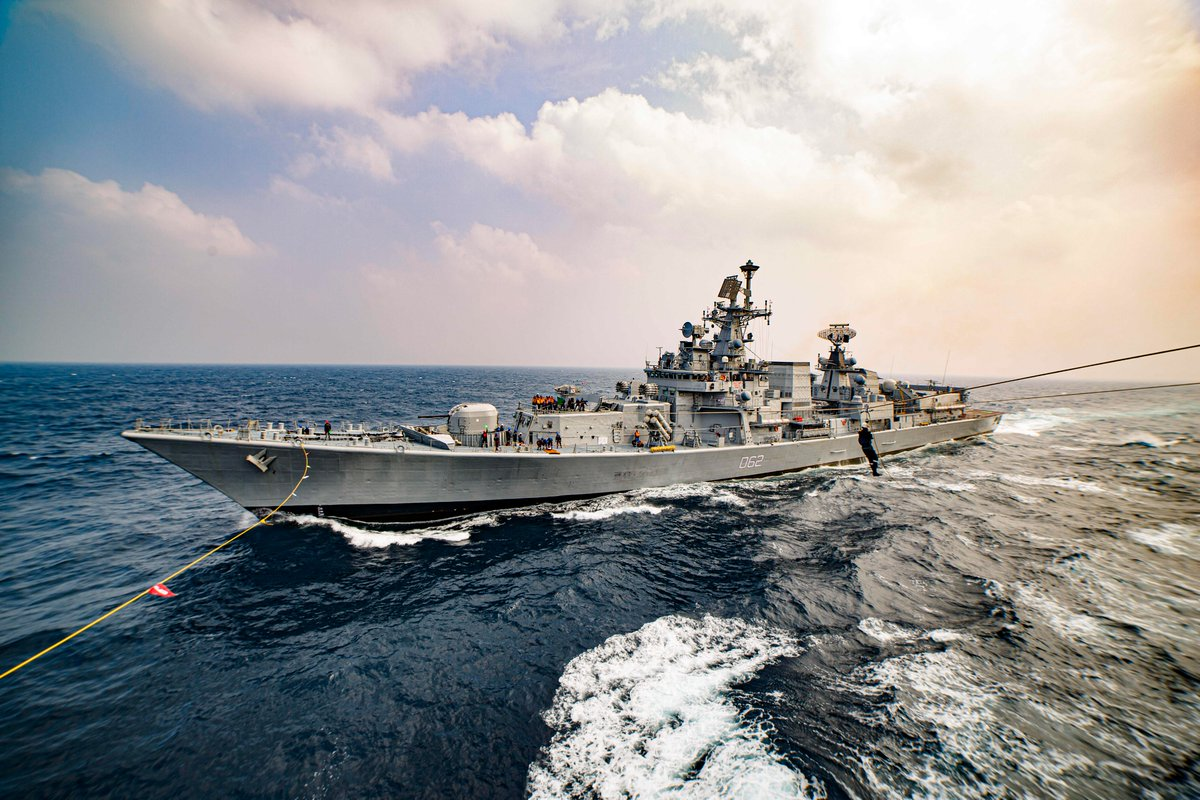
Mumbai (D62) performing transfer of personnel at sea.

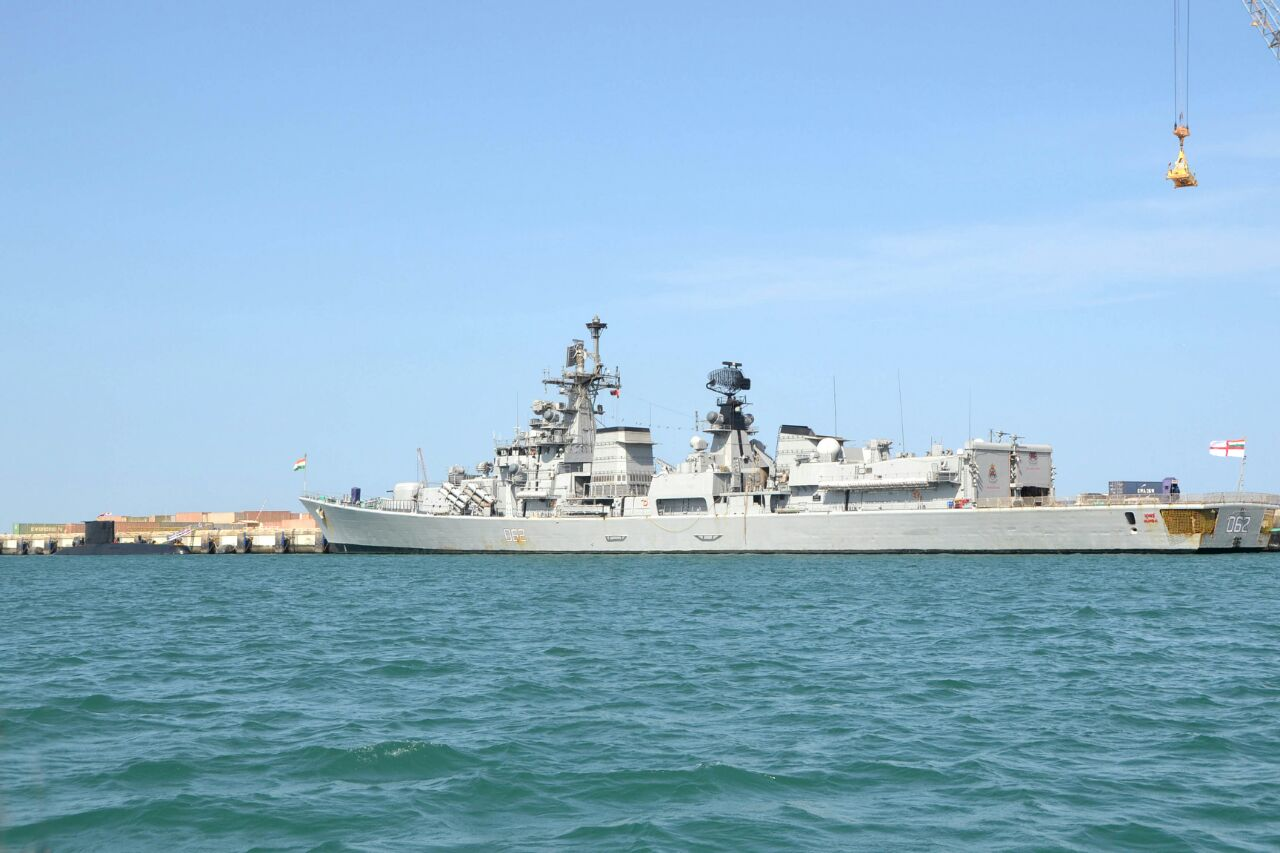
Mumbai enters Port of Duqm in Oman.

== See also ==
- List of destroyer classes in service

Equivalent destroyers of the same era

- Murasame class
- Type 051B
- Gwanggaeto the Great class
