= Western Fleet (India) =

Naval fleet of the Indian Navy

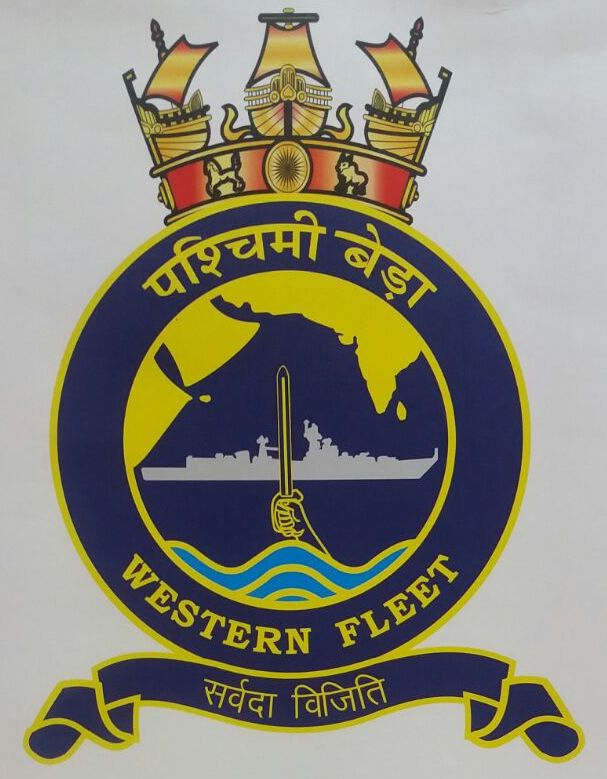
- Founded: 1 March 1968
- Country: India
- Branch: Indian Navy
- Type: Fleet
- Part of: Western Naval Command
- Headquarters: Mumbai
- Nickname: Sword Arm

Commanders
- FOCWF: Rear Admiral Srinivas Maddula, VSM
- Notable commanders: Rear Admiral E C Kuruvila, PVSM, AVSM

The Western Fleet is a Naval fleet of the Indian Navy. It is known as the 'Sword Arm' of the Indian Navy. It is headquartered at Mumbai, Maharashtra, on the west coast of India. It is a part of the Western Naval Command and is responsible for the naval forces in the Arabian Sea and parts of the Indian Ocean.

The Western Fleet was formally constituted on 1 March 1968. The Fleet is commanded by a two-star flag officer of the rank of rear admiral with the title Flag Officer Commanding Western Fleet (FOCWF). Rear Admiral Srinivas Maddula is the current FOCWF, who took over on 29 July 2026. The current flagship of the Western Fleet is the aircraft carrier INS Vikramaditya (R33). The newer IAC-1, INS Vikrant, has also joined the Western Fleet's carrier battle group.

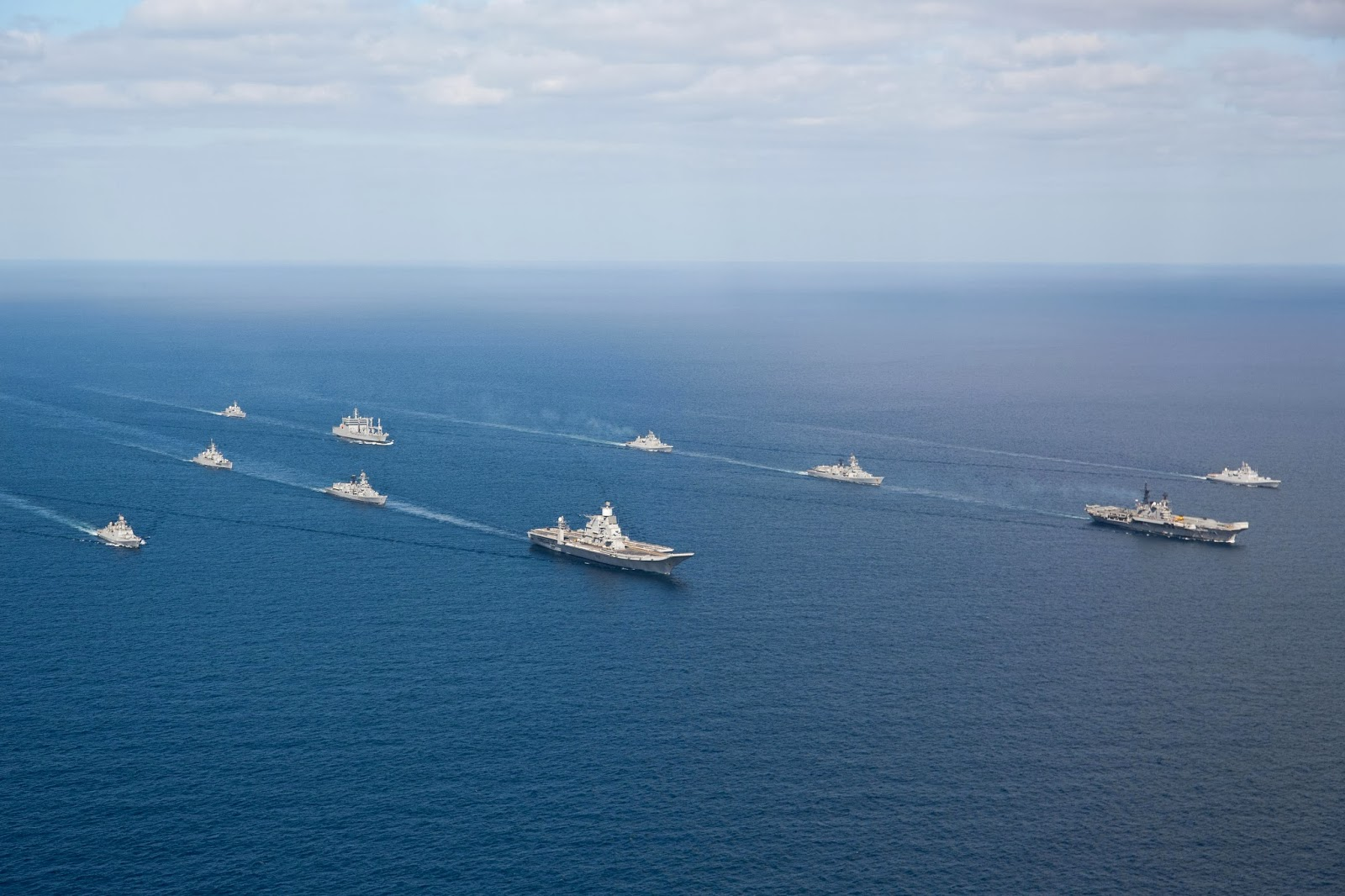
The Western Fleet in 2014 with the aircraft carriers INS Vikramaditya (R33) (flagship) and INS Viraat (R22) in the Arabian Sea

== History ==
After the independence and the Partition of India on 15 August 1947, the ships and personnel of the Royal Indian Navy were divided between the Dominion of India and the Dominion of Pakistan. The division of the ships was on the basis of two-thirds of the fleet to India, one third to Pakistan.

This was then called the Indian Fleet. After her commissioning in 1948, HMIS Delhi (later called INS Delhi) became the flagship of the Indian Fleet. The fleet commander was styled as Flag Officer Commanding Indian Fleet (FOCIF). In 1956, Rear Admiral Ram Dass Katari became the first Indian flag officer, and was appointed the first Indian commander of the fleet on 2 October, when he took over from Rear Admiral Sir St John Tyrwhitt. In 1957, INS Mysore was commissioned and the flag of Rear Adm Katari was transferred from INS Delhi to INS Mysore, thus making it the flagship of the Indian Fleet. The first aircraft carrier of the Indian Navy, INS Vikrant was commissioned in 1961 and became the flagship of the Indian Fleet.

On 1 March 1968, the Eastern Naval Command was established and the Indian Fleet was renamed as the Western Fleet.

== Indo-Pakistani War of 1971 ==
At the outbreak of war, the Western Fleet was commanded by Rear Admiral E C Kuruvilla, PVSM, AVSM. In mid 1971, The aircraft carrier INS Vikrant, along with the frigates INS Brahmaputra and INS Beas were moved from the Western Fleet to the Eastern Naval Command. Due to this, INS Mysore, once again, became the flagship of the Western Fleet.

According to Admiral Sourendra Nath Kohli, the then commander-in-chief Western Naval Command,

The Western Fleet was given a broad directive to seek and destroy enemy warships, protect our merchant shipping, deny sealanes to enemy shipping and render ineffective the maritime line of communication between West Pakistan and East Pakistan to prevent any reinforcements from reaching the beleaguered Pakistani forces at that end.

=== ORBAT ===
The order of battle of the Western Fleet in 1971 was:
Fleet commander: Rear Admiral Elenjikal Chandy Kuruvila, PVSM

Flagship INS Mysore – Captain RKS Gandhi, VrC

15th Frigate Squadron

- INS Trishul – Captain KMV Nair, VrC
- INS Talwar – Commander SS Kumar, VrC

14th Frigate Squadron

- INS Khukri – Captain Mahendra Nath Mulla, MVC
- INS Kirpan – Commander RR Sood, VrC, NM
- INS Kuthar – Commander UC Tripathi, NM

31 Patrol Squadron

Patrol Vessels

- INS Kiltan – Commander KP Gopal Rao, MVC, VSM
- INS Katchall – Commander KN Zadu, VrC
- INS Kadmatt – Commander Sukhmal Jain, NM

Frigates

- INS Cauvery – Commander IK Erry
- INS Kistna – Commander RAJ Anderson, VSM
- INS Tir – Commander M Pratap

Destroyer

- INS Ranjit – Commander RN Singh

Submarines

- INS Karanj – Commander Vijai Singh Shekhawat, VrC
- INS Kursura – Commander Arun Auditto, NM

OSA Class Patrol Boats 25 K Squadron – Commander Babru Bhan Yadav, MVC

251K Division

- INS Nashak – Lieutenant Commander RB Suri
- INS Nipat – Lieutenant Commander BN Kavina, VrC
- INS Nirghat – Lieutenant Commander J Sharma, AVSM, VrC
- INS Nirbhik – Lieutenant Commander SC Issacs

252 K Division

- INS Vijeta – Commander AK Parti
- INS Vinash – Lieutenant Commander Vijay Jerath, VrC
- INS Veer – Lieutenant Commander OP Mehta, VrC, NM
- INS Vidyut – Lieutenant Commander BB Singh

=== Operation Trident and Operation Python ===
On 4 December, the fleet successfully executed Operation Trident, a devastating attack on the Pakistan Naval Headquarters at Karachi that sank a minesweeper, a destroyer and an ammunition supply ship. The attack also irreparably damaged another destroyer and oil storage tanks at the Karachi port. To commemorate this, 4 December is celebrated as the Navy Day. This was followed by Operation Python on 8 December 1971, further deprecating the Pakistan Navy's capabilities.

In the war, The Indian frigate INS Khukri, commanded by Captain Mahendra Nath Mulla, MVC was sunk by PNS Hangor, while INS Kirpan was damaged on the west coast.

== Kargil War ==
The Indian Navy launched Operation Talwar on 25 May 1999. The entire Western Fleet had sailed from Mumbai to the North Arabian Sea to increase surveillance and adopt a deterrent posture. Elements of the Eastern Fleet joined the Western Fleet in the Arabian Sea later. The joint Western and Eastern Fleets blockaded the Pakistani ports (primarily the Karachi port). They began aggressive patrols and threatened to cut Pakistan's sea trade. This exploited Pakistan's dependence on sea-based oil and trade flows. Later, then-Prime Minister of Pakistan, Nawaz Sharif disclosed that Pakistan was left with just six days of fuel to sustain itself if a full-scale war had broken out.

== Op Sindoor ==
In the aftermath of the 2025 Pahalgam attack, India launched Operation Sindoor. Within 96 hours of the attack, the Western Fleet ships deployed at sea and carried out firings of surface-to-surface & surface-to-air missiles and torpedoes on the western coast. The carrier battle group was led by INS Vikrant and had around 36 warships and submarines operating together. The Pakistani naval fleet was reported to have remained confined within Karachi Harbour, unable to respond effectively due to the fleet's overwhelming presence. The heightened risk even led to international commercial vessels re-routing to avoid the tense waters around Karachi.

== Fleet commander ==
The fleet commander is titled Flag Officer Commanding Western Fleet (FOCWF). The appointment has been known by several titles since 1947:

- 1947 – 1951 – Commodore Commanding Indian Naval Squadron (COMINS)
- 1951 – 1952 – Rear Admiral Commanding Indian Naval Squadron (RACINS)
- 1952 – 1957 – Flag Officer Commanding (Flotillas) Indian Fleet (FOCFIF)
- 1957 – 1968 – Flag Officer Commanding Indian Fleet (FOCIF)
- 1968–present – Flag Officer Commanding Western Fleet (FOCWF)

== See also ==
- Western Naval Command
- Flag Officer Commanding Western Fleet
- Eastern Fleet
