= Krishna Swaminathan =

27th chief of the naval staff (India)

Admiral Krishna Swaminathan PVSM AVSM VSM
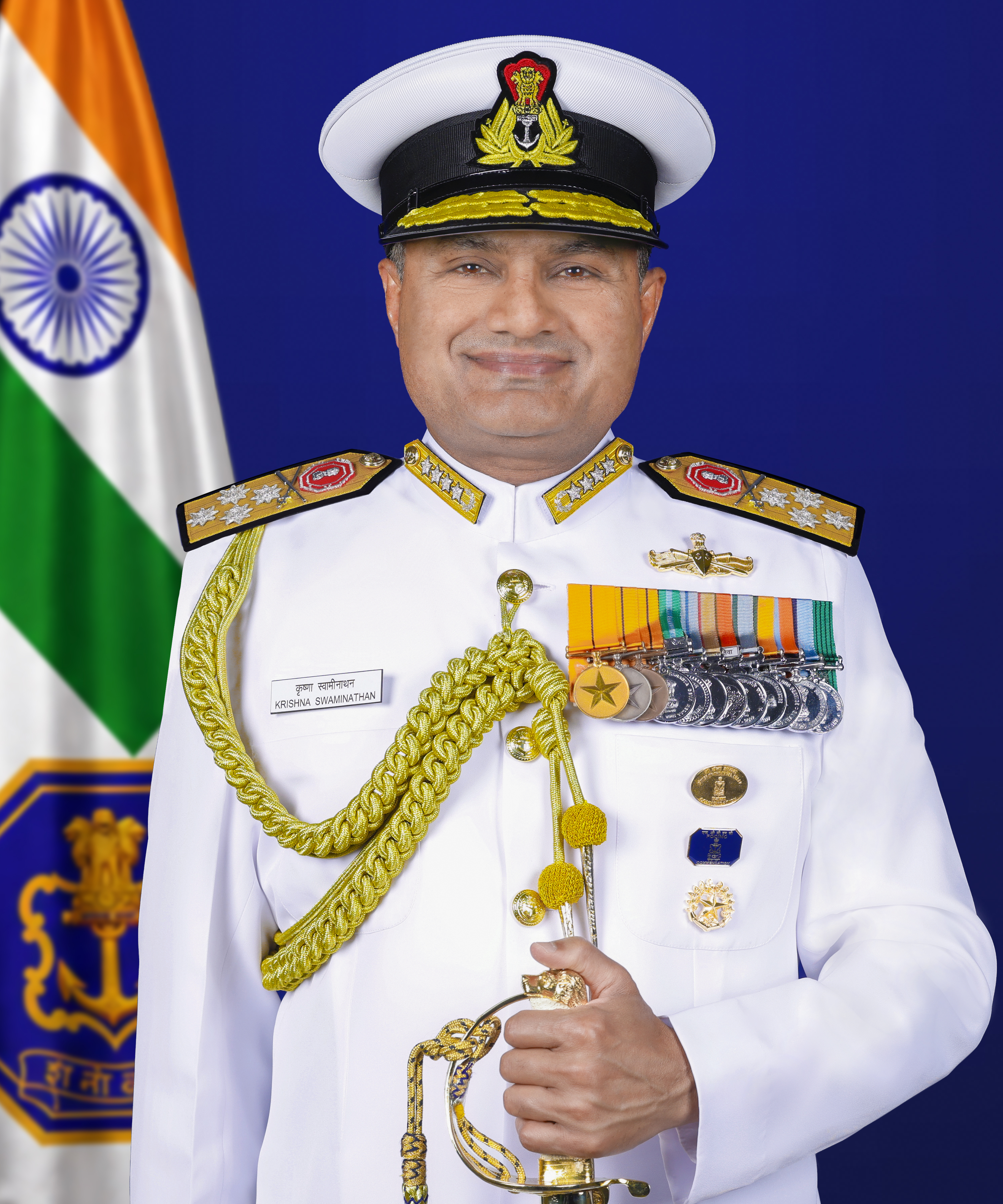
- Official portrait, 2026

27th chief of the naval staff
- Incumbent
- Assumed office 31 May 2026
- President: Droupadi Murmu
- Minister of Defence: Rajnath Singh
- Preceded by: Dinesh Kumar Tripathi

Flag Officer Commanding-in-Chief Western Naval Command
- In office 1 August 2025 – 30 May 2026
- Chief of Naval Staff: Dinesh Kumar Tripathi
- Preceded by: Sanjay Jasjit Singh
- Succeeded by: Sanjay Vatsayan

46th Vice Chief of the Naval Staff
- In office 1 May 2024 – 31 July 2025
- President: Droupadi Murmu
- Chief of Naval Staff: Dinesh Kumar Tripathi
- Preceded by: Dinesh Kumar Tripathi
- Succeeded by: Sanjay Vatsayan

Personal details
- Born: Bangalore, Karnataka
- Spouse: Laila Swaminathan

Military service
- Allegiance: India
- Branch/service: Indian Navy
- Years of service: July 1987 - present
- Rank: Admiral
- Commands: Western Naval Command; Western Fleet; INS Vikramaditya (R33); INS Mysore (D60); INS Kulish (P63); INS Vidyut (K48)
- Service Number: 03221-W
- Awards: Param Vishisht Seva Medal; Ati Vishisht Seva Medal; Vishisht Seva Medal

Admiral Krishna Swaminathan, PVSM, AVSM, VSM is a serving four-star flag officer in the Indian Navy. He is the current and the 27th chief of the naval staff. He previously served as the Flag Officer Commanding-in-Chief Western Naval Command and as the 46th vice chief of naval staff. His flag appointments include chief of personnel, controller of personnel services and chief of staff, Western Naval Command. He was the second commanding officer of the aircraft carrier INS Vikramaditya.

== Early life and education ==
Krishna was born to D. Swaminathan and Shanta Swaminathan, both teachers, in Bangalore. The Swaminathans resided in NR Colony in Basavanagudi. He attended the Bishop Cotton Boys' School until the age of 11. He then attended the Sainik School, Vijayapura, formerly Bijapur. While at Sainik School, he attended the Himalayan Mountaineering Institute course for young leaders and topped the course. He was also the school vice-captain. He subsequently joined the National Defence Academy, Pune as part of the 70th course. At NDA, he did well in academics and sports and was the Squadron Cadet Captain (SCC) of the Charlie squadron.

== Naval career ==
Krishna was commissioned into the Indian Navy on 1 July 1987. He spent his early years in Mumbai, receiving his watchkeeping ticket on the Pondicherry-class minesweeper INS Alleppey (M65). He subsequently served as the Missile Gunnery Officer of the lead ship of her class of missile boats, INS Chamak (K95). In the early 1990s, he served as the aide-de-camp to the governor of Uttar Pradesh. After a three-year tenure as ADC, he specialized in communication and electronic warfare, attending the Long C course at Signal School, Kochi.

Krishna then served as the electronic warfare officer of the aircraft carrier INS Viraat (R22), signal communications officer of the Khukri-class corvette, INS Khukri (P49) and back to Viraat as the signal communications officer. After the stints as specialist officer, he took over as the executive officer (EXO) of the Veer-class corvette, INS Vidyut (K48), part of the Killer Squadron. The next year, he was appointed commanding officer of Vidyut. After a short stint, he took command of her sister ship INS Vinash (K47).

In 2000, Krishna was selected to attend the Advanced Command and Staff Course at the Joint Services Command and Staff College (JSCSC), Shrivenham in the United Kingdom. He topped the course as the best International student. After returning to India, he served on the staff of the Western Fleet, as the Fleet Electronic Warfare Officer (FEWO). He was promoted to the rank of commander in June 2002 while serving as FEWO. The next year, he moved to the Defense Services Staff College, Wellington as a directing staff. After a year as DS, he was selected to serve as naval assistant (NA) to the Flag Officer Commanding-in-Chief Southern Naval Command, Vice Admiral SCS Bangara.

Krishna then commanded the Kora-class corvette INS Kulish (P63), part of the Eastern Fleet. After this command tenure, he moved to the Directorate of Naval Signals at naval headquarters. Promoted to the rank of captain in 2008, he attended the naval higher command course (NHCC) at the College of Naval Warfare in Mumbai. After completing the NHCC, he was selected to attend the Naval War College, Newport, Rhode Island in the United States. He was awarded the US Naval War College Foundation Award for academic excellence.

On his return, he was appointed NA to the chief of the naval staff, Admiral Nirmal Kumar Verma. After his stint as NA, he took command of the guided missile destroyer INS Mysore (D60). He was in command of Mysore during the President's fleet review in 2011. Under his command, the ship participated in INDRA - the joint naval exercise with Russia, in late 2012.

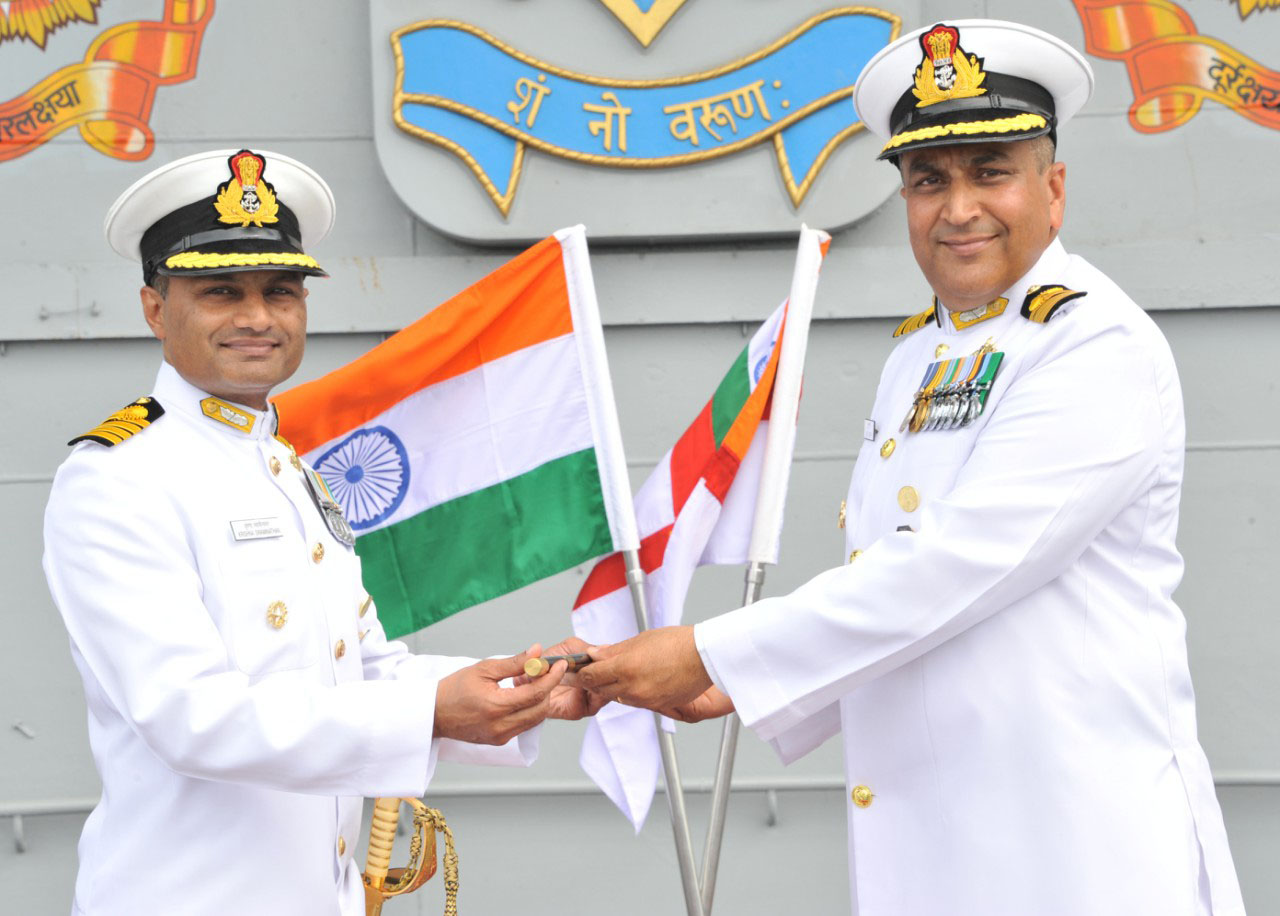
Krishna (left) takes command of INS Vikramaditya from Captain Suraj Berry.

As a commodore, Krishna served as the principal director naval signals at NHQ and had a second stint as NA to CNS, this time to Admiral Robin K. Dhowan. On 2 November 2015, Krishna took command of the flagship of the Indian Navy, the aircraft carrier INS Vikramaditya (R33) as its second commanding officer. He commanded the carrier during the International Fleet Review 2016. During his command tenure, Vikramaditya was adjudged the Best Ship of the Western Fleet.

=== Flag rank ===
Krishna was promoted to flag rank in 2016 and took over as the Chief Staff Officer (Training) (CSO (Trg)) at the Southern Naval Command, the training command of the Indian Navy, at Kochi. As CSO (Trg), he played a key role in the conduct of all training in the Navy. He was also instrumental in raising the Indian Navy Safety Team (INST) that oversees operational safety across all verticals of the Navy. During this tenure, he also served as CSO (Safety), a new vertical that the Navy had just created to streamline doctrinal and training aspects of safety. On 18 March 2019, he assumed the office of Flag Officer Sea Training (FOST), also at Kochi. As FOST, his charter included the conduct of the operational sea training of all ships and submarines of the Indian Navy and the Indian Coast Guard. It included enhancing crew proficiency in all aspects, including safe navigation practices, damage control and firefighting drills, weapon firings as well as seamanship training.

Krishna then took over command of the Western Fleet on 14 February 2020 as the Flag Officer Commanding Western Fleet. He was in command of the fleet during the COVID-19 pandemic. In February 2021, he relinquished command of the Western Fleet and was appointed Flag Officer Defence Advisory Group and took over from Rear Admiral Ravindra Jayant Nadkarni. He was the FODAG during the extremely severe Cyclone Tauktae, which impacted off-shore oil operations.

On 4 November 2021, Krishna was promoted to the rank of vice admiral and assumed the appointment of chief of staff, Western Naval Command. In April 2023, he was appointed controller of personnel services at Naval headquarters, New Delhi. After a short stint as CPS, on 6 October 2023 he was appointed as the chief of personnel. On 1 May 2024, he took over as the 46th vice chief of naval staff, succeeding Vice Admiral Dinesh K Tripathi upon his elevation as the chief of the naval staff. On 31 July 2025, he took over as the Flag Officer Commanding-in-Chief, Western Naval Command succeeding Vice Admiral Sanjay Jasjit Singh.

=== Chief of Naval Staff ===
On 9 May 2026, the Government of India appointed Vice Admiral Krishna Swaminathan as the next chief of the naval staff succeeding Admiral Dinesh Kumar Tripathi who superannuated on 31 May. On 31 May 2026, he took over as the 27th chief of the naval staff.

== Personal life ==
He is married to Mrs. Laila Swaminathan. The couple have two daughters.

== Awards and decorations ==
During his career, Krishna has been awarded the Param Vishisht Seva Medal in 2026, the Ati Vishisht Seva Medal in 2021 and the Vishisht Seva Medal in 2017.

Param Vishisht Seva Medal	Ati Vishisht Seva Medal	Vishisht Seva Medal	Samanya Seva Medal
Operation Vijay Medal	Operation Parakram Medal	Sainya Seva Medal	75th Independence Anniversary Medal
50th Independence Anniversary Medal	30 Years Long Service Medal	20 Years Long Service Medal	9 Years Long Service Medal

== See also ==
- Flag officer commanding Western Fleet
- Western Fleet
- INS Vikramaditya

Military offices
Preceded by Suraj Berry	Commanding Officer INS Vikramaditya; 2015 - 2017	Succeeded by Ajay Kochhar
Preceded by Sanjay Jasjit Singh	Flag Officer Sea Training; 2019 - 2020	Succeeded by Rajesh Pendharkar
Preceded by Sanjay Jasjit Singh	Flag Officer Commanding Western Fleet; 14 February 2020 – 24 February 2021	Succeeded by Ajay Kochhar
Preceded by Ravindra Jayant Nadkarni	Flag Officer Defence Advisory Group; February 2021 - November 2021	Succeeded by Mahesh Singh
Preceded by R. B. Pandit	Chief of Staff, Western Naval Command; November 2021 - March 2023	Succeeded by Sanjay Bhalla
Preceded by Suraj Berry	Controller of Personnel Services; April 2023 - October 2023	Succeeded by Gurcharan Singh
Preceded by Suraj Berry	Chief of Personnel; October 2023 - April 2024	Succeeded by Sanjay Bhalla
Preceded by Dinesh K Tripathi	Vice Chief of the Naval Staff; 1 May 2024 - 31 July 2025	Succeeded by Sanjay Vatsayan
Preceded by Sanjay Jasjit Singh	Flag Officer Commanding-in-Chief Western Naval Command; 1 August 2025 - 30 May 2026	Succeeded by Sanjay Vatsayan
Preceded by Dinesh K Tripathi	Chief of the Naval Staff; 31 May 2026 - Present	Incumbent
