= Sanjay Vatsayan =

Indian Navy Vice Admiral

Vice Admiral Sanjay Vatsayan PVSM AVSM NM
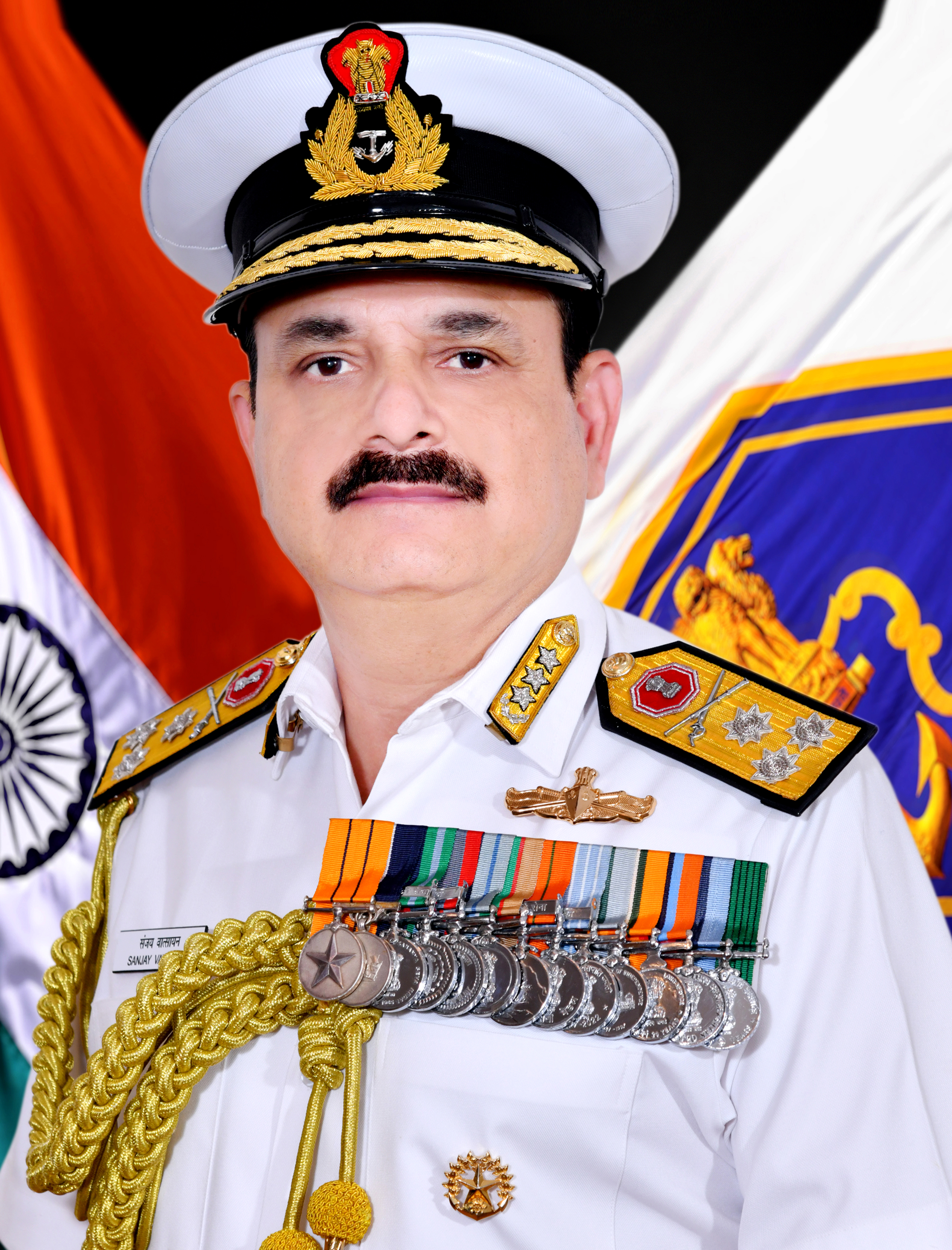
- Official Portrait, 2026

Flag Officer Commanding-in-Chief Western Naval Command
- Incumbent
- Assumed office 30 May 2026
- Chief of Naval Staff: Krishna Swaminathan
- Preceded by: Krishna Swaminathan

47th Vice Chief of the Naval Staff
- In office 1 August 2025 – 29 May 2026
- Chief of Naval Staff: Dinesh Kumar Tripathi
- Preceded by: Krishna Swaminathan
- Succeeded by: Ajay Kochhar

Personal details
- Education: National Defence Academy; Indian Naval Academy

Military service
- Allegiance: India
- Branch/service: Indian Navy
- Years of service: 1 January 1988 – present
- Rank: Vice Admiral
- Commands: Western Naval Command; Eastern Fleet; INS Sahyadri (F49); INS Kuthar (P46); INS Nashak (K83); INS Vibhuti (K45)
- Service Number: 03295-N
- Awards: Param Vishisht Seva Medal; Ati Vishisht Seva Medal; Nao Sena Medal

Vice Admiral Sanjay Vatsayan, PVSM, AVSM, NM is a serving flag officer of the Indian Navy. He currently serves as the Flag Officer Commanding-in-Chief, Western Naval Command. He previously served as the 47th Vice Chief of the Naval Staff. He also served as the Deputy Chief of Integrated Defence Staff (Policy Planning & Force Development), as the Deputy Chief of Integrated Defence (Operations) and as chief of staff, Eastern Naval Command.

== Early life and education ==
He is an alumnus of the 71st Course of the National Defence Academy, Khadakwasla and the Indian Naval Academy, Ezhimala. He is also an alumnus of the Defence Services Staff College, Wellington, the Naval War College, Goa and the National Defence College, New Delhi.

== Naval career ==
The flag officer was commissioned into the Indian Navy on 1 January 1988. In a career spanning over three decades, he has tenanted numerous staff and command appointments. He has a specialisation in Gunnery & missile systems and has vast experience at sea and ashore. He has served on the Samar-class offshore patrol vessel ICGS Sangram and was part of the commissioning crew of the Delhi-class Guided missile destroyer INS Mysore (D60). He has commanded the Coast Guard Ship C-05 the Veer-class missile boats INS Vibhuti (K45) and INS Nashak (K83), the Khukri-class corvette INS Kuthar (P46) and was the commissioning commanding officer of the Shivalik-class Guided missile frigate INS Sahyadri (F49). His staff appointments include serving as the joint director of personnel, director of personnel (policy), as the director naval plans (perspective planning) and the principal director naval plans at the Naval HQ.

=== Flag rank ===
On promotion to flag rank in February 2018, Vatsayan took over as the assistant chief of naval staff (policy and plans). On 10 February 2020, he assumed the appointment as the Flag Officer Commanding Eastern Fleet. In February 2021, he relinquished command of the Eastern Fleet and was appointed as the deputy commandant of the National Defence Academy, Khadakwasla.

After getting promoted to the rank of vice admiral, he assumed the appointment of chief of staff, Eastern Naval Command on 16 December 2021. After a stint of over eighteen months as COS, he moved to the Integrated Defence Staff headquarters. On 9 August 2023, he assumed the appointment of Deputy Chief of Integrated Defence (Operations) and was subsequently moved as the Deputy Chief of Integrated Defence Staff (Policy Planning & Force Development) on 1 December 2023.

On 1 August 2025, Vice Admiral Sanjay Vatsayan took over as the 47th vice chief of the naval staff, succeeding Vice Admiral Krishna Swaminathan, who moved to Western Naval Command as its FOCinC. On 30 May 2026, he was appointed the flag officer commanding-in-chief Western Naval Command, taking over again from Vice Admiral Krishna Swaminathan.

== Awards and decorations ==
Vatsayan has been awarded the Param Vishisht Seva Medal in 2026, the Ati Vishisht Seva Medal in 2021 and the Nao Sena Medal in 2017.

Param Vishisht Seva Medal	Ati Vishisht Seva Medal	Nau Sena Medal	Samanya Seva Medal
Special Service Medal	Operation Vijay Medal	Operation Parakram Medal	Sainya Seva Medal
Videsh Seva Medal	75th Anniversary of Independence Medal	50th Anniversary of Independence Medal	30 Years Long Service Medal
	20 Years Long Service Medal	9 Years Long Service Medal	

Military offices
Preceded by Suraj Berry	Flag Officer Commanding Eastern Fleet; 2020–2021	Succeeded by Tarun Sobti
Preceded by Biswajit Dasgupta	Chief of Staff, Eastern Naval Command; 16 December 2021 – 8 August 2023	Succeeded by Sameer Saxena
Preceded by Rajesh Pendharkar	Deputy Chief of the Integrated Defence Staff (Operations); 9 August 2023 - 30 November 2023	Succeeded by Jeetendra Mishra
Preceded by Manjinder Singh	Deputy Chief of the Integrated Defence Staff (Policy Planning & Force Development); 1 December 2023 - 31 July 2025	Succeeded by Vineet McCarty
Preceded by Krishna Swaminathan	Vice Chief of the Naval Staff; 1 August 2025 - 29 May 2026	Succeeded by Ajay Kochhar
Preceded by Krishna Swaminathan	Flag Officer Commanding-in-Chief Western Naval Command; 30 May 2026 - Present	Incumbent
