= R. B. Pandit =

Former Senior officer in the Indian Navy

Vice Admiral R. B. Pandit PVSM, AVSM
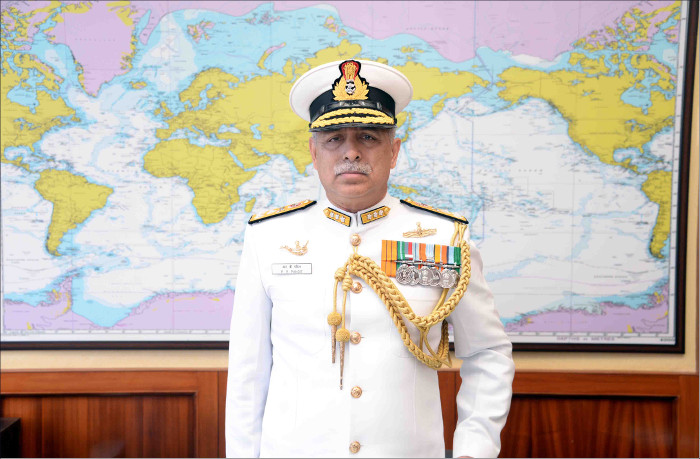
- Military career
- Allegiance: India
- Branch: Indian Navy
- Service years: July 1984 - September 2023
- Rank: Vice Admiral
- Service number: 02746-R
- Commands: Western Fleet; 22nd Missile Vessel Squadron; INS Jalashwa; INS Vindhyagiri; INS Nirghat
- Awards: Param Vishisht Seva Medal; Ati Vishisht Seva Medal

Vice Admiral Ravindra Bhartruhari Pandit, PVSM, AVSM is a former Flag Officer of the Indian Navy. He last served as the Commander-in-Chief, Strategic Forces Command. He assumed the position from Air Marshal Rajesh Kumar. He earlier served as the Chief of Staff of the Western Naval Command, as Commandant of Indian Naval Academy and as the Flag Officer Commanding Western Fleet.

== Career ==
Pandit graduated from the National Defence Academy and was commissioned into the Executive Branch of the Navy in July 1984. He is an Anti-submarine warfare specialist.

During his career, he has attended the Defence Services Staff College, Wellington, College of Naval Warfare, Mumbai and the Royal College of Defence Studies, London. Pandit has commanded the Veer-class corvette INS Nirghat, the Nilgiri-class frigate INS Vindhyagiri and the only Amphibious transport dock of the Indian Navy - the INS Jalashwa. He has also commanded the 22nd Missile Vessel Squadron.

=== Flag rank ===
After promotion to the flag rank of Rear Admiral, Pandit commanded the Western Fleet.

Ashore, he has served as the Naval Advisor at the High Commission of India, Islamabad in Pakistan, the Assistant Chief of Naval Staff (Foreign Cooperation and Intelligence) at the Naval Headquarters and the Chief of Staff, Southern Naval Command.

In the rank of Vice Admiral, he has served as the Commandant of the Indian Naval Academy, Ezhimala before taking over as the Chief of Staff, Western Naval Command. On 26 January 2018, he was awarded the Ati Vishisht Seva Medal for distinguished service of a high order. He was appointed Commander-in-Chief, Strategic Forces Command on 31 August 2021. On 26 January 2023, he was awarded the Param Vishisht Seva Medal for distinguished service of the most exceptional order.

== Awards and decorations ==
Pandit was awarded the Ati Vishisht Seva Medal in 2018 and the Param Vishisht Seva Medal in 2023.

Param Vishisht Seva Medal	Ati Vishisht Seva Medal	Samanya Seva Medal	Special Service Medal
Operation Vijay Medal	Sainya Seva Medal	Videsh Seva Medal	50th Anniversary of Independence Medal
	30 Years Long Service Medal	20 Years Long Service Medal	9 Years Long Service Medal

Military offices
Preceded by Rajesh Kumar	Commander-in-Chief, Strategic Forces Command; 31 August 2021 - 30 September 2023	Succeeded by Suraj Berry
Preceded by Ajendra Bahadur Singh	Chief of Staff, Western Naval Command; June 2019 - August 2021	Succeeded by Krishna Swaminathan
Preceded by S. V. Bhokare	Commandant, Indian Naval Academy; February 2018 - June 2019	Succeeded by Dinesh K Tripathi
Preceded by Ravneet Singh	Flag Officer Commanding Western Fleet; October 2016 - January 2018	Succeeded by M A Hampiholi
