= Ajay Kochhar =

48th Vice Chief of Naval Staff (India)

Vice Admiral Ajay Kochhar PVSM AVSM NM
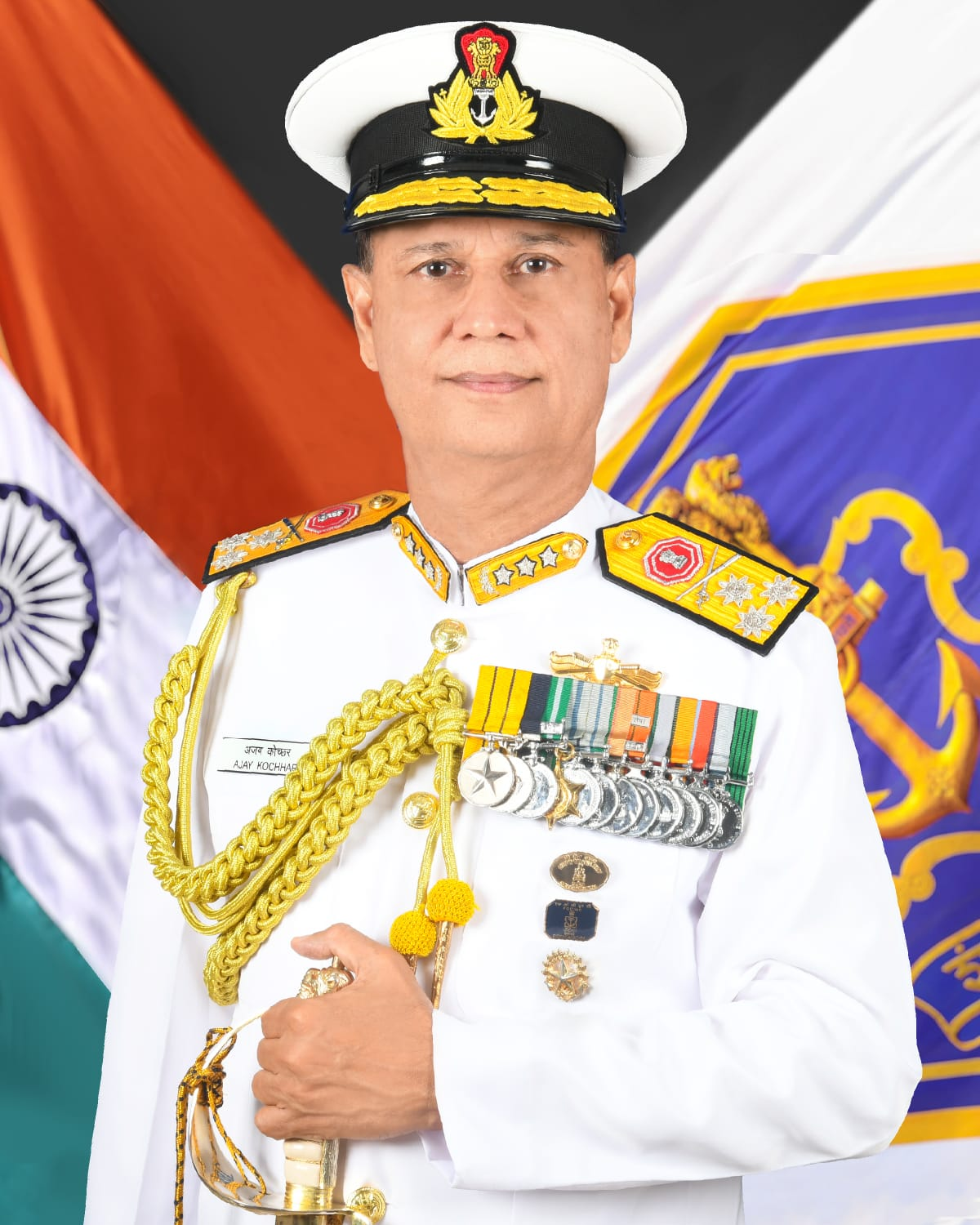
- Official portrait, 2026

48th Vice Chief of the Naval Staff
- Incumbent
- Assumed office 29 May 2026
- Preceded by: Sanjay Vatsayan

Commander-in-Chief Andaman and Nicobar Command
- In office 1 October 2025 – 25 May 2026
- Chief of Defence Staff: Anil Chauhan
- Preceded by: Dinesh Singh Rana
- Succeeded by: Vineet McCarty

Military service
- Allegiance: India
- Branch/service: Indian Navy
- Years of service: 1 July 1988 - present
- Rank: Vice Admiral
- Commands: Andaman and Nicobar Command; National Defence Academy; Western Fleet; INS Vikramaditya (R33); INS Trikand (F51)
- Service number: 03326-H
- Awards: Param Vishisht Seva Medal; Ati Vishisht Seva Medal; Nao Sena Medal

Vice Admiral Ajay Kochhar, PVSM, AVSM, NM is a serving flag officer in the Indian Navy who is currently serving as the 48th Vice Chief of the Naval Staff since 2026. He previously served as the Commander-in-Chief, Andaman and Nicobar Command. He earlier served as the Chief of Staff, Western Naval Command, as the Commandant of the National Defence Academy , and as the Flag Officer Commanding Western Fleet.

== Early life and education ==
Kochhar is an alumnus of the National Defence Academy, Khadakwasla, the Defence Service Staff College, Wellington and the Naval War College, Mumbai. He is also an alumnus of Royal College of Defence Studies, United Kingdom.

== Naval career ==
Kochhar was commissioned into the Indian Navy on 1 July 1988. He is a specialist in Gunnery and Missile Warfare. He has commanded five warships. He commanded the Veer-class missile boats INS Nashak (K83) and INS Vibhuti (K45). He served as the Joint Director at Naval Plans at naval headquarters. He also commanded the Khukri-class corvette, INS Kirpan (P44) as a Commander.

As a Captain, on 29 June 2013, as the commissioning commanding officer of the Talwar-class stealth guided missile frigate INS Trikand (F51), he commissioned the ship in Kaliningrad, Russia. He also served as the Director of Staff Requirements at NHQ and as the third Commanding officer of aircraft carrier INS Vikramaditya (R33). During his tenure as CO Vikramaditya, the carrier successfully completed the integration and operationalisation of its air wing. In the rank of Commodore, he served as Principal Director DSCT at NHQ.

=== Flag rank ===
On elevation to Flag rank in 2018, Kochhar assumed the charge of Assistant Controller Carrier Project (ACCP) and as Assistant Controller of Warship Production and Acquisition (ACWP&A) at Naval headquarters, New Delhi. As the ACCP, he oversaw the construction of the indigenous aircraft carrier. On 24 February 2021, he took over as the Flag Officer Commanding Western Fleet succeeding Rear Admiral Krishna Swaminathan. After a short stint, he relinquished the command Western Fleet on 27 December 2021 and was appointed Project Director (Operations and Training) of the Advanced Technology Vessel Project (ATVP).

After promotion to the rank of Vice Admiral, on 1 April 2022, Kochhar took over as the Commandant of the National Defence Academy succeeding Air Marshal Sanjeev Kapoor.After a two-year stint, he assumed the appointment of Chief of Staff, Western Naval Command on 25 May 2024 succeeding Vice Admiral Sanjay Bhalla.

On 1 October 2025, Kochhar took over as the Commander-in-Chief, Andaman and Nicobar Command succeeding Lieutenant General Dinesh Singh Rana who moved as Commander-in-Chief, Strategic Forces Command. He relinquished the appointment of CINCAN on 25 May 2026. After a short stint, on 29 May 2026, he took over as the 48th Vice Chief of the Naval Staff succeeding Vice Admiral Sanjay Vatsayan who moved to Western Naval Command as its FOCinC.

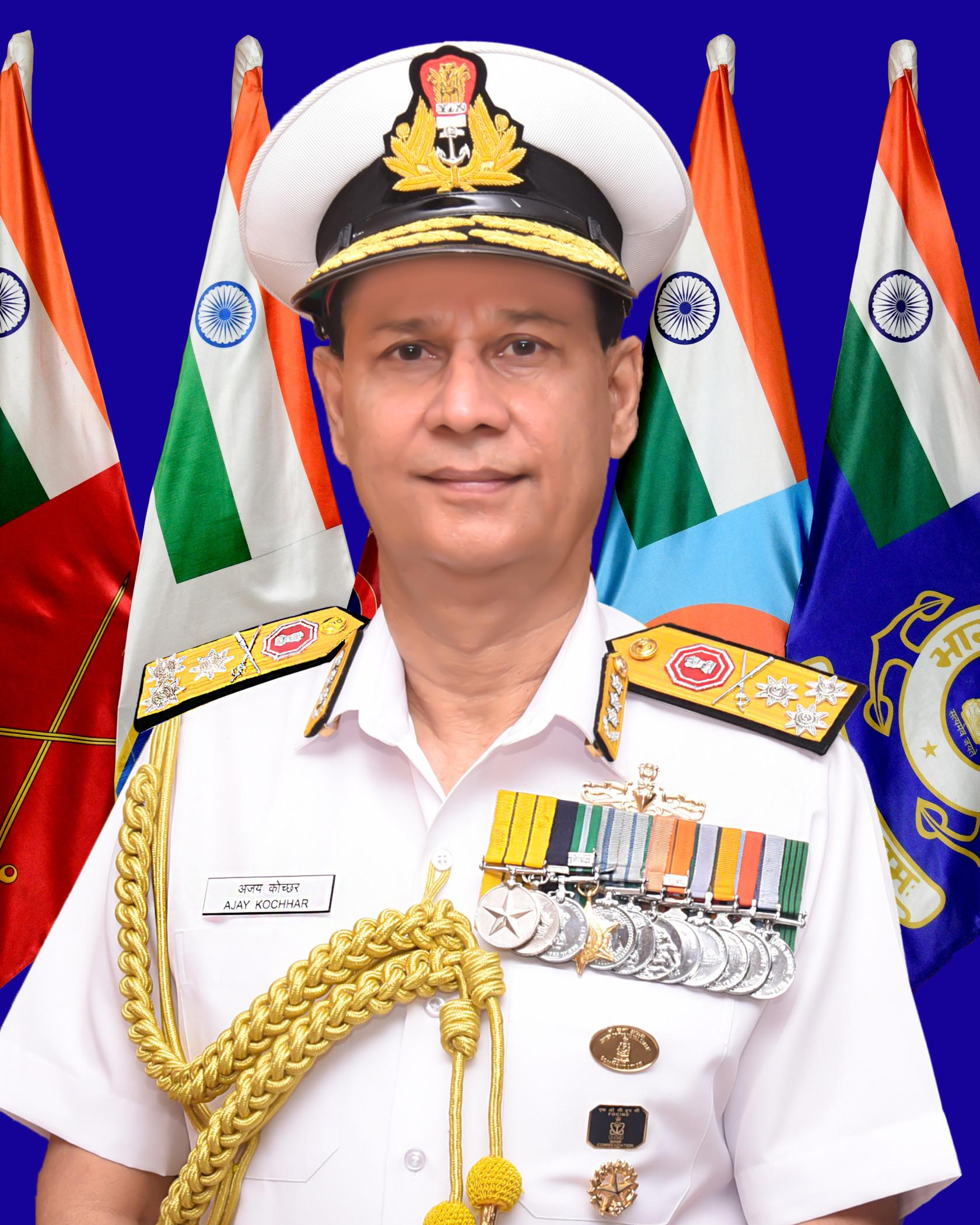
VAdm Ajay Kochhar as C-in-C Andaman and Nicobar Command

== Personal life ==
Kochhar is married to Reyman, an artist. The couple has two children.

== Awards and decorations ==
Kochhar was awarded the Param Vishisht Seva Medal in 2026, the Ati Vishisht Seva Medal in 2022 and the Nao Sena Medal.

Param Vishisht Seva Medal	Ati Vishisht Seva Medal	Nao Sena Medal	Samanya Seva Medal
Operation Vijay Star	Operation Vijay Medal	Operation Parakram Medal	Sainya Seva Medal
75th Independence Anniversary Medal	50th Independence Anniversary Medal		30 Years Long Service Medal
	20 Years Long Service Medal	9 Years Long Service Medal	

== See also ==
- Flag Officer Commanding Western Fleet
- Western Fleet
- INS Vikramaditya

Military offices
Preceded by Krishna Swaminathan	Commanding Officer, INS Vikramaditya; 2017 - 2018	Succeeded by Puruvir Das
Preceded by Krishna Swaminathan	Flag Officer Commanding Western Fleet; 2021 - 2021	Succeeded by Sameer Saxena
Preceded by Sanjeev Kapoor	Commandant of the National Defence Academy; 2022 - 2024	Succeeded by Gurcharan Singh
Preceded by Sanjay Bhalla	Chief of Staff, Western Naval Command; 25 May 2024 - 30 September 2025	Succeeded by Rahul Vilas Gokhale
Preceded by Dinesh Singh Rana	Commander-in-Chief, Andaman and Nicobar Command; 1 October 2025 - 28 May 2026	Succeeded by Vineet McCarty
Preceded by Sanjay Vatsayan	Vice Chief of the Naval Staff; 29 May 2026 - Present	Incumbent
