= K. M. Ramakrishnan =

Indian Navy Admiral

Rear Admiral K. M. Ramakrishnan VSM
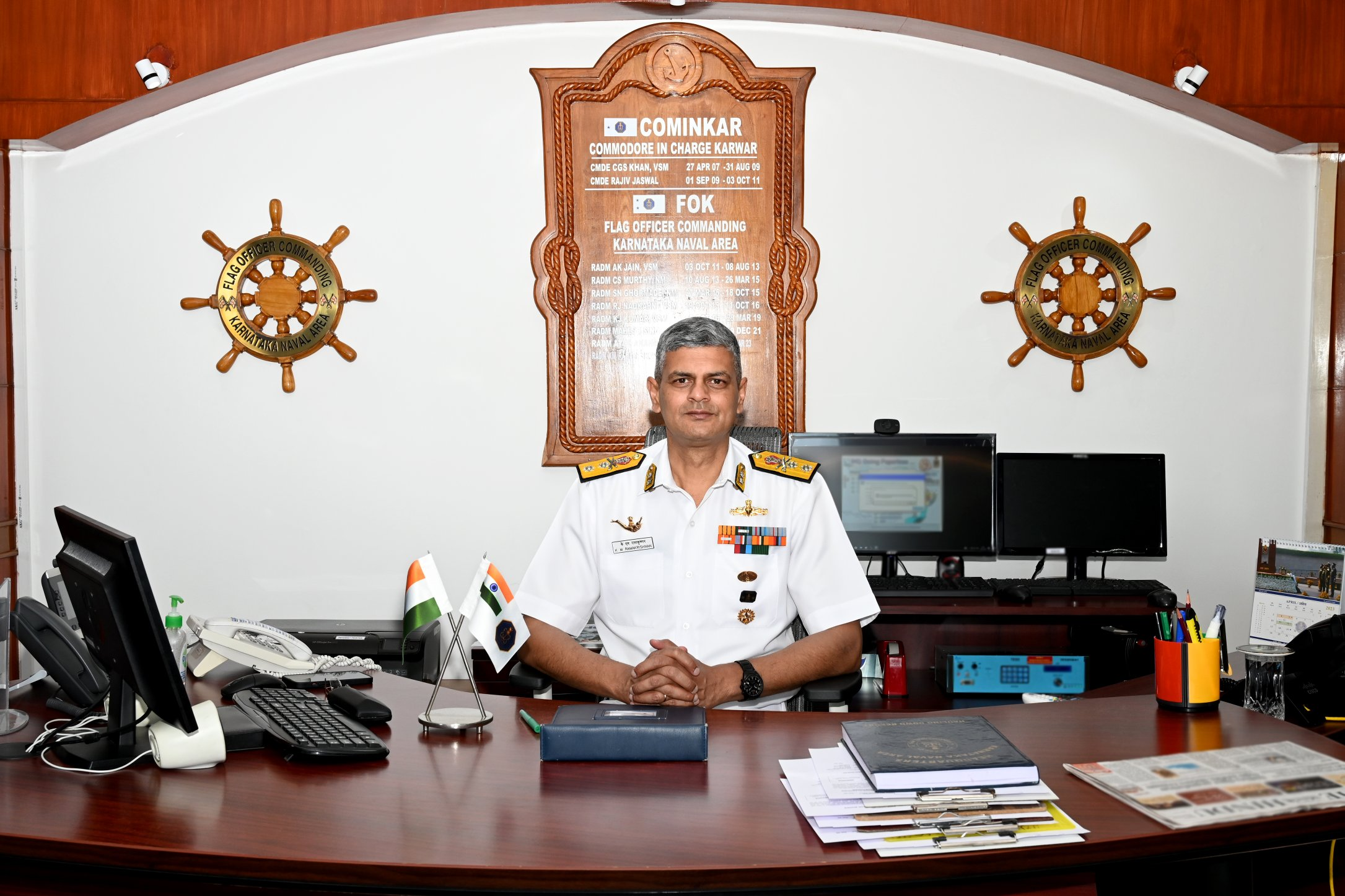
- Alma mater: Indian Naval Academy
- Military career
- Allegiance: India
- Branch: Indian Navy
- Service years: 1991 – 2026
- Rank: Rear Admiral
- Commands: Karnataka Naval Area; INS Betwa (F39); INS Subhadra (P51); INS Nirbhik (K41)
- Other work: A deep-tech enthusiast, after his premature retirement from Indian Navy, he is working with StartUps, SMEs and MSMEs to indigenise technologies and enable early absorption into Defence and Aerospace sectors.

Rear Admiral Kunnisery Mallath Ramakrishnan, VSM is a serving Flag officer in the Indian Navy. He earlier served as the Flag Officer Commanding Karnataka Naval Area and as the Assistant Chief of Naval Staff (Communication, Space, Network Centric Operations) at Naval Headquarters.

== Naval career ==
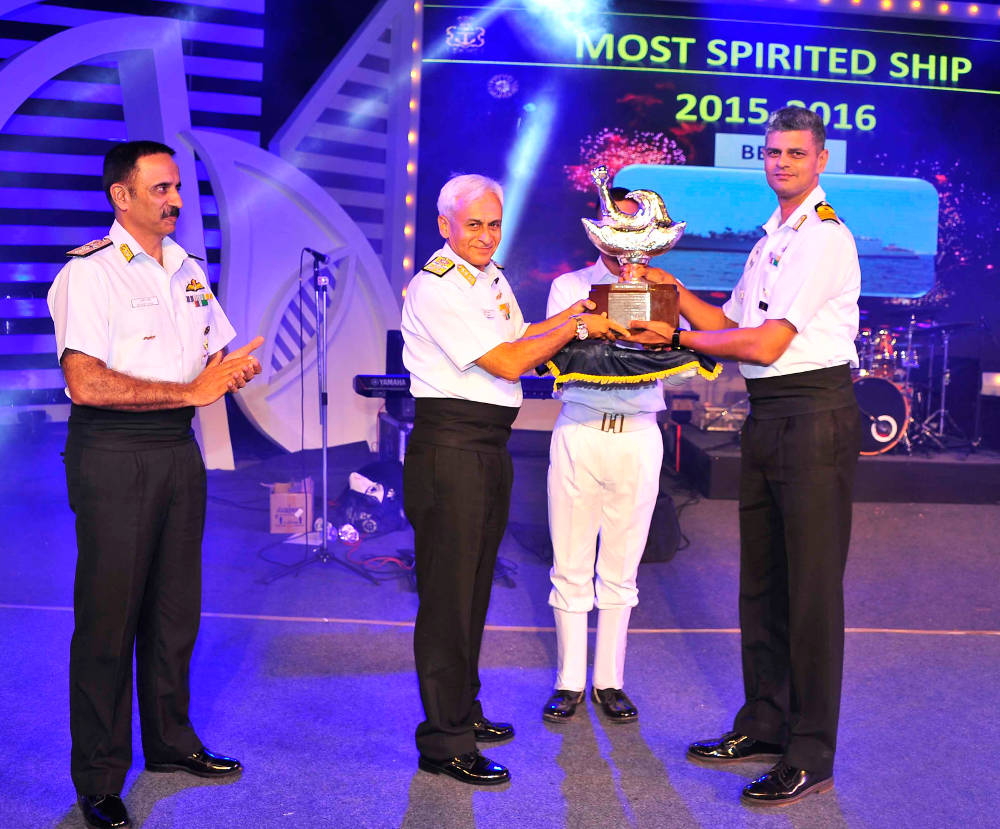
Ramakrishnan (right), as CO INS Betwa, receiving the 'Most Spirited Ship' trophy from FOC-in-C VAdm Sunil Lanba with FOCWF RAdm Ravneet Singh watching on.

Ramakrishnan graduated from the National Defence Academy, Khadakwasla, and was commissioned into the Indian Navy on 1 January 1991. He is a specialist in Navigation and Direction. After his specialisation, he served as the Navigating Officer of the Sukanya-class patrol vessel INS Sharda (P55), the Khukri-class corvette INS Kuthar (P46), the Rajput-class destroyer INS Rana (D52), the training ship INS Krishna (F46), and the lead ship of Talwar-class frigates INS Talwar (F40).

Ramakrishnan attended the Defence Services Staff College, Wellington, and the Army War College, Mhow. He holds an MPhil in Defence & Management, an M.Phil in Defence Studies, an M.Sc in Defence Studies and a Masters in Human Resource Management. In his staff appointments, Ramakrishnan has served as Directing staff at his alma mater Defence Services Staff College. He also served as the Fleet Navigation Officer of the Eastern Fleet and as the Command Plans Officer of the Western Naval Command.

Ramakrishnan has commanded the Veer-class missile vessel INS Nirbhik (K41) and the Sukanya-class patrol vessel INS Subhadra (P51). He subsequently commanded the Brahmaputra-class guided missile frigate INS Betwa (F39). During his command tenure, Betwa was adjudged the 'Most Spirited Ship' of the Western Fleet in 2016.

As a Commodore, Ramakrishnan served as the Commodore in charge of the Kochi Workup Team. During this tenure, he was awarded the Vishisht Seva Medal on 26 January 2018. He then moved to naval headquarters as Commodore (Network Centric Operations). As the Commodore (NCO), he represented India at the 2019 Trilateral Indian Ocean Maritime Security workshop in Fremantle, Australia.

=== Flag rank ===
Ramakrishnan was promoted to flag rank and was appointed Assistant Chief of Naval Staff (Communication, Space, Network Centric Operations) (ACNS (CSNCO)) at the naval headquarters. ACNS (CSNCO) is an Assistant Principal Staff Officer appointment reporting into the Director General of Naval Operations. As On 1 April 2023, he was appointed Flag Officer Commanding Karnataka Naval Area (FOK). As FOK, he was responsible for the operations and administration of all units and establishments in Karnataka, including the Naval Base Karwar.

== Awards and decorations ==

Vishisht Seva Medal	Samanya Seva Medal	Operation Vijay Star	Operation Vijay Medal
Sainya Seva Medal	75th Independence Anniversary Medal	50th Independence Anniversary Medal	30 Years Long Service Medal
	20 Years Long Service Medal	9 Years Long Service Medal	

Military offices
Preceded by Atul Anand	Flag Officer Commanding Karnataka Naval Area; 2023 – Present	Incumbent
