= Admiral Berry =

Admiral Berry may refer to:

- Edward Berry (1768–1831), British Royal Navy rear admiral
- John Berry (Royal Navy officer) (1635–1689 or 1690), British Royal Navy admiral
- Suraj Berry (fl. 1980s–2020s), Indian Navy vice admiral
