= Suraj Berry =

Officer in the Indian Navy

Vice Admiral Suraj Berry PVSM, AVSM, NM, VSM
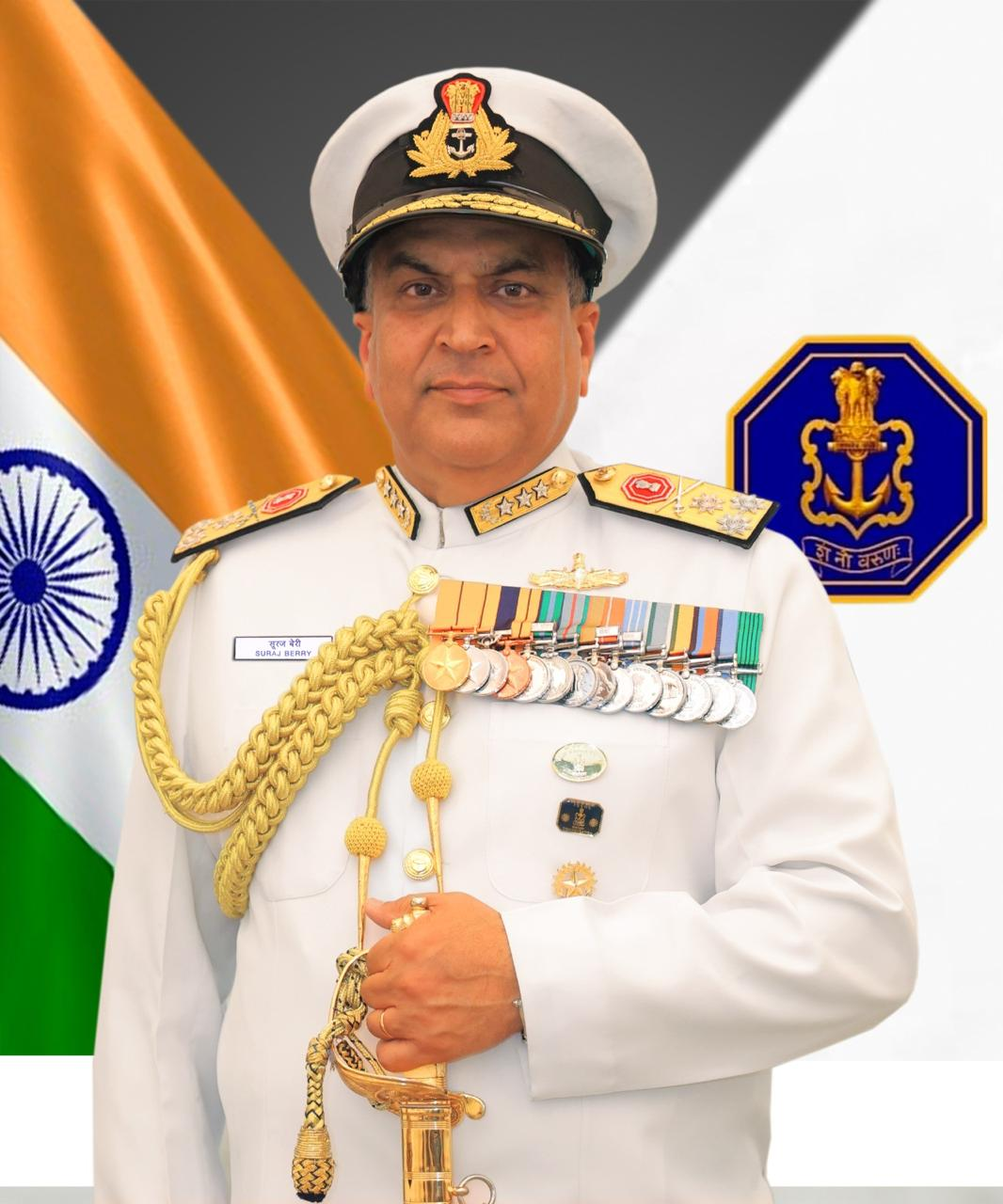
- Alma mater: Indian Naval Academy
- Military career
- Allegiance: India
- Branch: Indian Navy
- Service years: 01 January 1987 – 30 September 2025
- Rank: Vice admiral
- Service number: 03101Y
- Commands: INS Nirbhik; INS Karmuk; INS Talwar; INS Vikramaditya; Eastern Fleet; Strategic Forces Command
- Awards: Ati Vishisht Seva Medal; Nao Sena Medal; Vishisht Seva Medal

Vice Admiral Suraj Berry, PVSM, AVSM, NM, VSM is a former flag officer in the Indian Navy. He last served as the Commander-in-Chief, Strategic Forces Command. He previously served as the chief of personnel, as the Controller of Personnel Services and as chief of staff of the Andaman and Nicobar Command. He has also commanded the Eastern Fleet and was the commissioning commanding officer of the aircraft carrier INS Vikramaditya.

== Naval career ==
Berry was commissioned in the Indian Navy on 1 January 1987. He is a specialist in Gunnery and Missile Warfare. He served on board the Sukanya-class patrol vessel INS Subhadra (P51), the Veer-class corvette INS Pralaya (K91), and the Rajput-class destroyers INS Ranjit (D53) and INS Ranvir (D54), and the lead ship of her class of destroyers INS Delhi (D61).

He has also served as the flag lieutenant to the Flag Officer Commanding-in-Chief Western Naval Command, as the operations officer of a Mobile Missile Coastal Battery, and as the fleet gunnery officer of the Western Fleet.

Berry has commanded the Veer-class missile vessel INS Nirbhik (K88), the Kora-class missile corvette INS Karmuk (P64) and the Talwar-class stealth guided missile frigate INS Talwar (F40). He served as the defence advisor to the High Commissioner of India to Sri Lanka and Maldives. In the rank of captain, he also served as a director at the Directorate of Staff Requirement at Naval Headquarters.

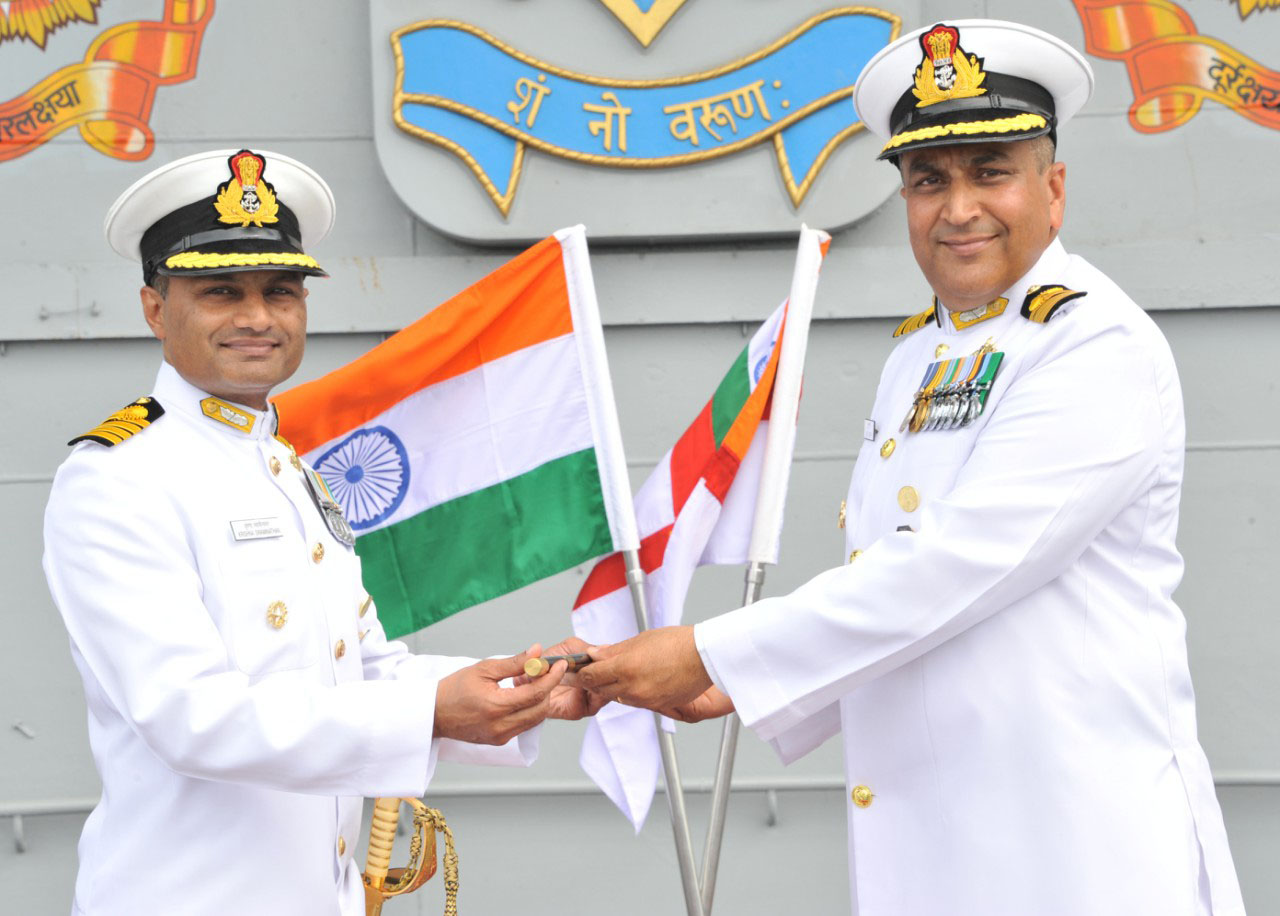
Berry (right) hands over command of INS Vikramaditya to Capt. Krishna Swaminathan in 2015.

As a commodore, he served as naval advisor (NA) to the chief of naval staff Admiral Nirmal Kumar Verma. He then was appointed the commissioning commanding officer of the aircraft carrier INS Vikramaditya (R33). As CO, he commissioned Vikramaditya on 16 November 2013 at Severodvinsk in Russia and brought her home to Karwar. He then moved to naval headquarters as the principal director strategy, concepts and transformation at NHQ.

=== Flag rank ===
In October 2016, Berry was promoted to the rank of rear admiral and appointed assistant chief of personnel (human resource development) (ACOP HRD) at Naval HQ. After a two-and-a-half year stint, he was appointed Flag Officer Commanding Eastern Fleet (FOCEF) on 30 March 2019. For his tenure as the FOCEF, he was awarded the Ati Vishisht Seva Medal on 26 January 2020. In February 2020, he moved to Port Blair as the chief of staff of the Andaman and Nicobar Command.

On 2 August 2021, he was promoted to the rank of vice admiral and appointed controller of personnel services (CPS) at NHQ, succeeding Vice Admiral Sanjay Jasjit Singh On 1 April 2023, he was appointed chief of personnel. After a short stint as COP, he was appointed Commander-in-Chief, Strategic Forces Command (C-inC SFC) on 6 October 2023. The SFC is responsible for the management and administration of the country's tactical and strategic nuclear weapons stockpile. He retired from the Navy on 30 September 2025, after 38 years of service.

== Awards and decorations ==
Berry was awarded the Vishist Seva Medal in 2006 for services during the tsunami relief operations in Sri Lanka and Maldives. He is also the recipient of the Nao Sena Medal in 2015 (awarded for devotion to duty). He was awarded the Ati Vishisht Seva Medal in 2020. He has also been awarded the Chief of Naval Staff Commendation card once and the FOC‑in‑C Western Naval Command commendation card twice.

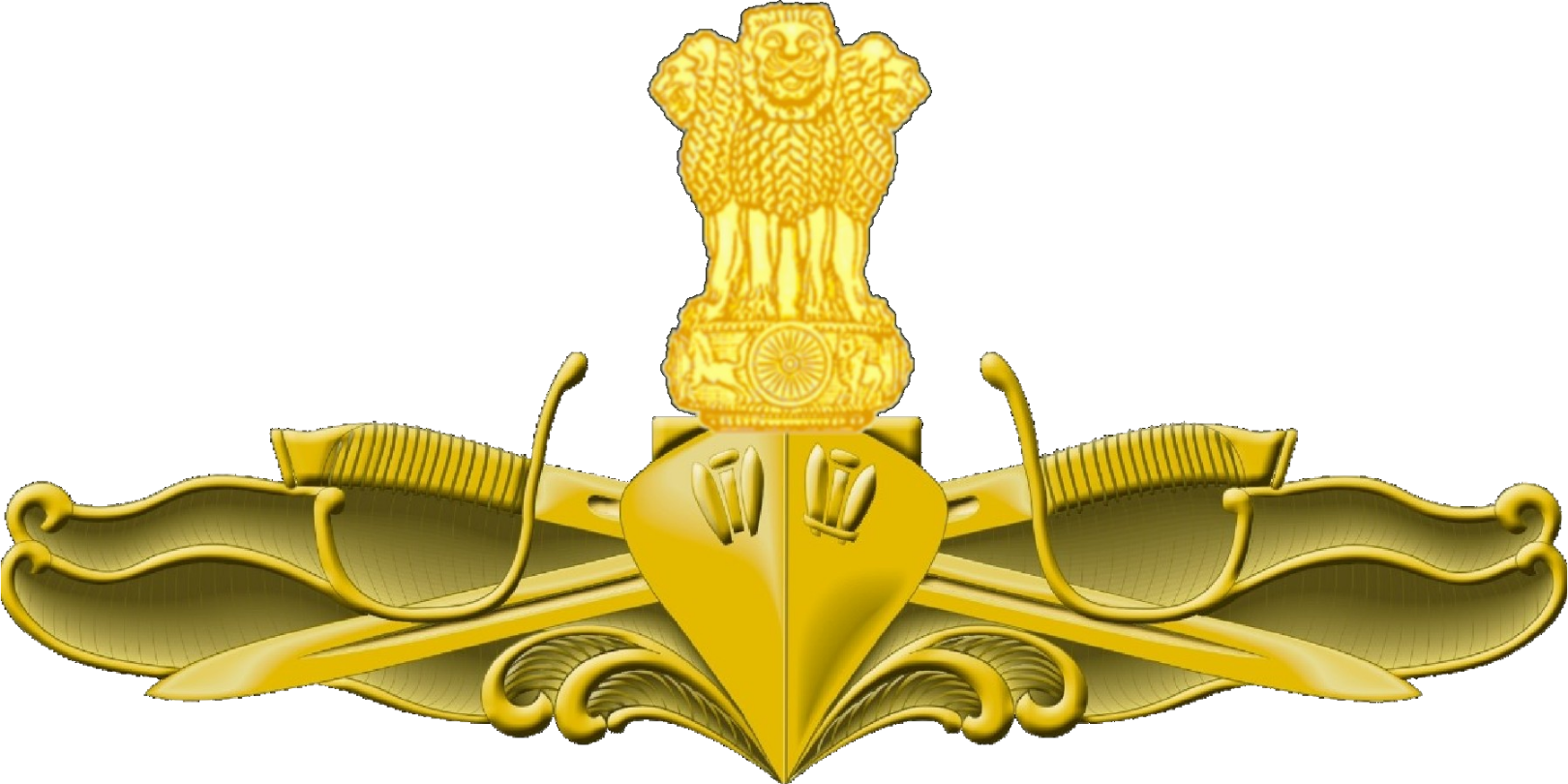

Surface Warfare Badge
1st Row	Param Vishisht Seva Medal	Ati Vishisht Seva Medal	Nau Sena Medal	Vishisht Seva Medal
2nd Row	Samanya Seva Medal	Operation Vijay Medal	Operation Parakram Medal	Sainya Seva Medal
3rd Row	Videsh Seva Medal	75th Anniversary of Independence Medal	50th Anniversary of Independence Medal	30 Years Long Service Medal
4th Row	20 Years Long Service Medal		9 Years Long Service Medal	

== Personal life ==
Berry is married to Kangana Berry. The couple have two children.

== See also ==
- Eastern Fleet
- INS Vikramaditya

Military offices
New title First holder	Commanding officer, INS Vikramaditya; 2013 – 2015	Succeeded by Krishna Swaminathan
Preceded by Dinesh K Tripathi	Flag Officer Commanding Eastern Fleet; 2019 – 2020	Succeeded by Sanjay Vatsayan
Preceded by Major General Beji Mathews	Chief of Staff, Andaman and Nicobar Command; 2020 - 2021	Succeeded by Rear Admiral D. S. Gujral
Preceded by Sanjay Jasjit Singh	Controller of Personnel Services; 2021 – 2023	Succeeded by Krishna Swaminathan
Preceded by Dinesh K Tripathi	Chief of Personnel; 2023 – 2023	Succeeded by Krishna Swaminathan
Preceded by R. B. Pandit	Commander-in-Chief, Strategic Forces Command; 2023 – 30 September 2025	Succeeded by Dinesh Singh Rana
