= Flag Officer Commanding Karnataka Naval Area =

Flag Officer Commanding Karnataka Naval Area (FOK)
- Flag of the FOK (Rear Admiral's flag)

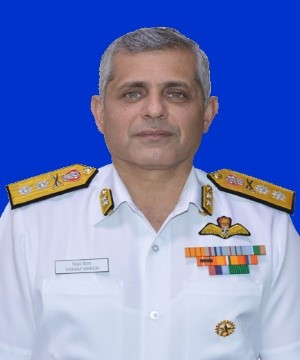
- Incumbent; Rear Admiral Vikram Menon VSM since 21 August 2025
- Indian Navy
- Abbreviation: FOK
- Reports to: Flag Officer Commanding-in-Chief Western Naval Command
- Seat: Karwar
- First holder: Commodore K. P. Ramachandran (as COMINKAR)

Flag Officer Commanding Karnataka Naval Area (FOK) is a senior appointment in the Indian Navy. One of the five area commanders of the Indian Navy, the FOK is a two star admiral holding the rank of rear admiral. The FOK is responsible for the operations and administration of all units and establishments in Karnataka, including the Naval Base Karwar. The Current FOK is Rear Admiral Vikram Menon, VSM, who assumed office on 21 August 2025.

== History ==
In 1999, following Pokhran-II, then defence minister George Fernandes approved Project Seabird to pursue the construction of the new naval base at Karwar in the state of Karnataka. The first phase of construction of the base was completed in 2005 and the base was commissioned on 31 May 2005.

Headquarters Karnataka Naval Area (HQKNA) thus came into being on 31 May 2005. Commodore K. P. Ramachandran, VSM was appointed the first commodore-in-charge Karwar (COMINKAR). The COMINKAR also discharged the duties of naval officer-in-charge Karnataka (NOIC (KTK)) and commanding officer INS Kadamba. After three incumbents serving as COMINKAR, the billet was upgraded to two-star rank and rechristened Flag Officer Commanding Karnataka Naval Area (FOK) in 2011. Rear Admiral Atul Kumar Jain was the first FOK who took over on 3 October 2011.

== Organisation ==
The FOK is assisted by the NOIC (KTK), a one-star appointment. The NOIC (KTK) also serves as the chief staff officer at Headquarters Karnataka Naval Area (HQKNA). The FOK is responsible to the Flag Officer Commanding-in-Chief Western Naval Command for the operations and administration of all units and establishments in Karnataka. This includes all ships and submarines based at the Karwar Naval Base as well. The establishments under the FOK include:

- The Naval Base Karwar INS Kadamba
- The naval hospital INHS Patanjali
- The missile and ammunition base INS Vajrakosh
- Naval Ship Repair Yard (NSRY) Karwar
- Sagar Prahari Bal, Karwar

== List of commanders ==
S.No.	Name	Assumed office	Left office	Notes
Commodore-in-Charge Karwar (COMINKAR)
1	Commodore K. P. Ramachandran VSM	31 May 2005	26 April 2007	First COMINKAR.
2	Commodore C. G. Silar Khan VSM	27 April 2007	31 August 2009	
3	Commodore Rajiv Jaswal	1 September 2009	3 October 2011	
Flag Officer Commanding Karnataka Naval Area (FOK)
4	Rear Admiral Atul Kumar Jain VSM	3 October 2011	8 August 2013	First FOK. Later Flag Officer Commanding-in-Chief Eastern Naval Command and Chief of Integrated Defence Staff.
5	Rear Admiral C. S. Murthy NM	10 August 2013	26 March 2015	
6	Rear Admiral Satishkumar Namdeo Ghormade NM	27 March 2015	18 October 2015	Later Vice Chief of the Naval Staff.
7	Rear Admiral Ravindra Jayant Nadkarni VSM	19 October 2015	11 October 2016	Later Flag Officer Defence Advisory Group.
8	Rear Admiral K. J. Kumar VSM	11 October 2016	29 March 2019	Later Flag Officer Commanding Tamil Nadu & Puducherry Naval Area.
9	Rear Admiral Mahesh Singh NM	30 March 2019	19 December 2021	Later Flag Officer Defence Advisory Group.
10	Rear Admiral Atul Anand VSM	20 December 2021	30 March 2023	Current Additional Secretary of the Department of Military Affairs.
11	Rear Admiral K. M. Ramakrishnan VSM	1 April 2023	20 August 2025	
12	Rear Admiral Vikram Menon VSM	21 August 2025	Present	Current FOK.

== See also ==
- INS Kadamba

== Bibliography ==
- Doraibabu, M; Godbole, Amrut (2023), A Decade of Transformation: The Indian Navy 2011-2021, Harper Collins Publishers India, ISBN 9789394407909
