= Ravindra Jayant Nadkarni =

Officer in the Indian Navy

Rear Admiral R J Nadkarni AVSM, VSM
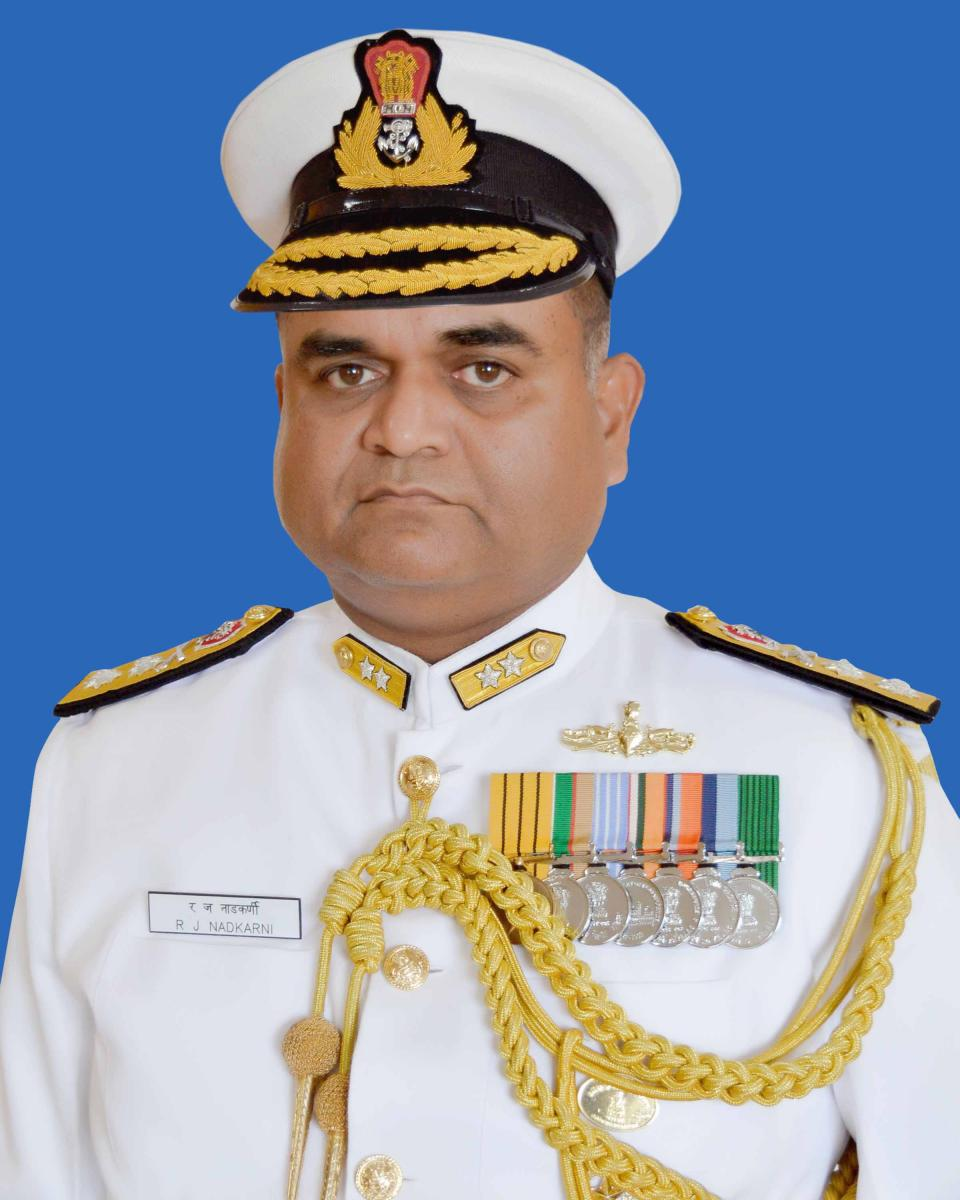
- Relatives: Admiral Jayant Ganpat Nadkarni (father)
- Military career
- Allegiance: India
- Branch: Indian Navy
- Service years: 1983 - 2021
- Rank: Rear Admiral
- Commands: INS Cuddalore; INS Himgiri; INS Betwa
- Awards: Ati Vishisht Seva Medal; Vishisht Seva Medal

Rear Admiral Ravindra Jayant Nadkarni, AVSM, VSM is a former flag officer in the Indian Navy. He last served as the Flag Officer Defence Advisory Group (FODAG). He previously served as the Flag Officer Commanding Karnataka Naval Area.

== Early life ==
Nadkarni was born to Admiral Jayant Ganpat Nadkarni, an officer in the Indian Navy who rose to become the 12th Chief of the Naval Staff, and Vimal Nadkarni.

== Education ==
Nadkarni did his undergraduate studies at the National Defence Academy, Khadakvasla. He went on to graduate from the staff course at the Defence Services Staff College in Wellington. He also attended the College of Naval Warfare in Karanja and the National Defence College in New Delhi.

== Career ==
He was commissioned in the Indian Navy on 1 July 1983. As a lieutenant, he commanded a Coast Guard interceptor boat CGS C-05. As a lieutenant commander, he commanded a minesweeper INS Cuddalore. Later, as a commander, he commanded the frigate INS Himgiri. The last ship he commanded was as a captain, INS Betwa. From 15 October 2016 to 10 January 2020, he was the chief of staff of the Southern Naval Command, which is the training command of the Indian Navy.

== Military awards and aecorations ==
Nadkarni was a recipient of the Vishisht Seva Medal in 2014 and the Ati Vishist Seva Medal in 2019.

Ati Vishist Seva Medal	Vishisht Seva Medal	Samanya Seva Medal	Operation Parakram Medal
Sainya Seva Medal	Videsh Seva Medal	50th Anniversary of Independence Medal	30 Years Long Service Medal
20 Years Long Service Medal		9 Years Long Service Medal	

Military offices
Preceded by Satishkumar Namdeo Ghormade	Flag Officer Commanding Karnataka Naval Area; 2015 – 2016	Succeeded by K. J. Kumar
