= Sanjay Jasjit Singh =

Indian Navy admiral

Vice Admiral Sanjay Jasjit Singh SYSM, PVSM, AVSM, NM
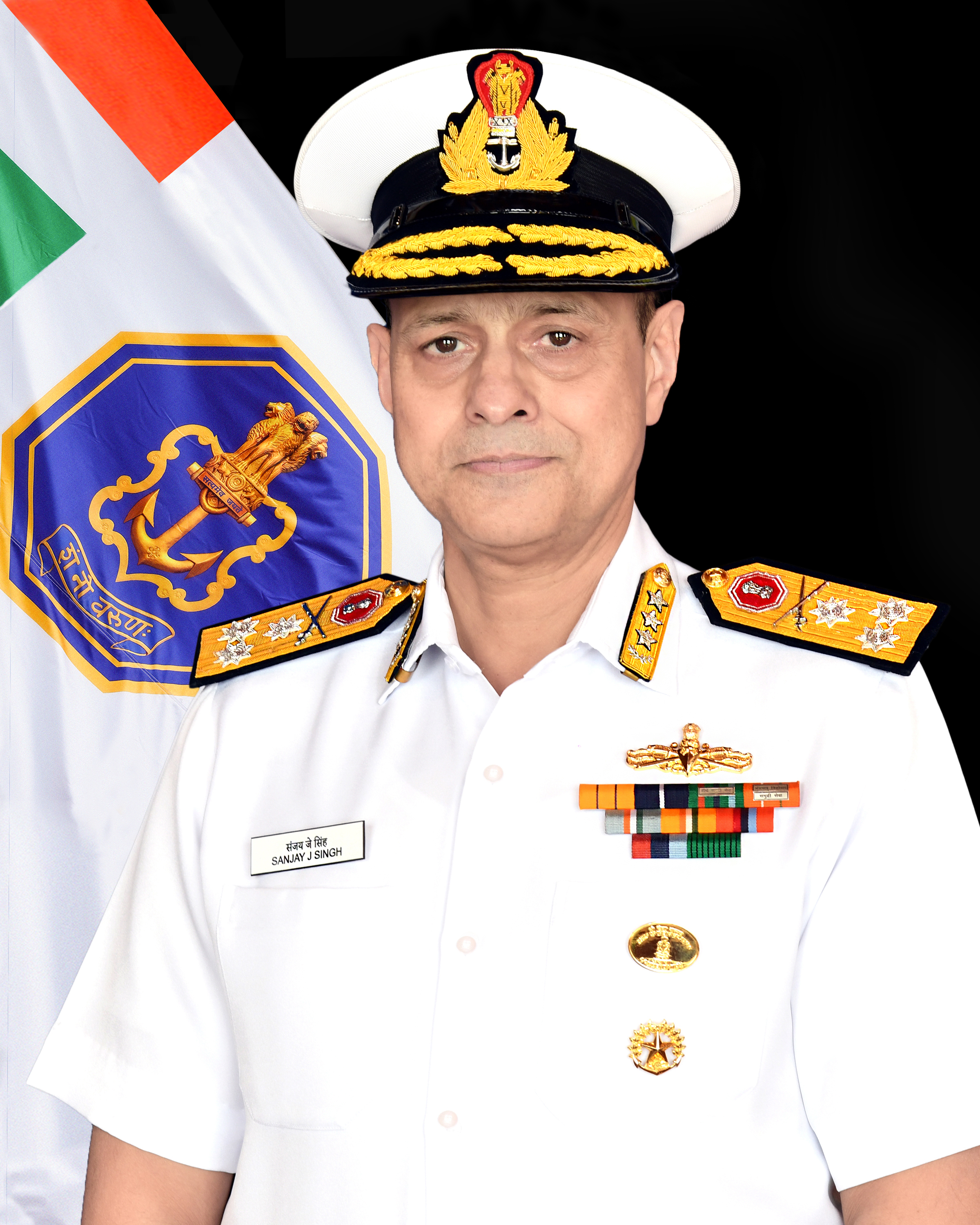
- Singh as FOCinC WNC

Flag Officer Commanding-in-Chief Western Naval Command
- In office 3 January 2024 – 31 July 2025
- Preceded by: Dinesh K Tripathi
- Succeeded by: Krishna Swaminathan

37th Vice Chief of the Naval Staff
- In office 1 April 2023 – 31 December 2023
- President: Droupadi Murmu
- Chief of Naval Staff: R. Hari Kumar
- Preceded by: Satishkumar Namdeo Ghormade
- Succeeded by: Dinesh K Tripathi

Personal details
- Born: July 1965 (age 61)
- Relations: Air Commodore Jasjit Singh (father)
- Education: Indian Naval Academy

Military service
- Allegiance: India
- Branch/service: Indian Navy
- Years of service: 01 July 1986 - 31 July 2025
- Rank: Vice Admiral
- Commands: Western Naval Command; Western Fleet; INS Trishul (F43); INS Taragiri (F41)
- Awards: Sarvottam Yudh Seva Medal; Param Vishisht Seva Medal; Ati Vishisht Seva Medal; Nao Sena Medal

Vice Admiral Sanjay Jasjit Singh, SYSM, PVSM, AVSM, NM is a retired flag officer in the Indian Navy. He served as the Flag Officer Commanding-in-Chief Western Naval Command during Operation Sindoor. He became the first Naval recipient of the Sarvottam Yudh Seva Medal, India's highest wartime distinguished service decoration. He previously served as the 37th Vice Chief of the Naval Staff.

He is currently the director general of the United Service Institution, New Delhi, India’s oldest think tank on defence and security.

== Early life and education ==
Singh was born in an Armed Forces family and is a third-generation officer. His father, Air Commodore Jasjit Singh, AVSM, VrC, VM was an officer in the Indian Air Force. Jasjit Singh, as a fighter pilot in No. 3 Squadron IAF, was awarded the Vir Chakra for gallantry in the Indo-Pakistani War of 1971. After retiring from the IAF, he headed the think tank Institute for Defence Studies and Analyses (later Manohar Parrikar Institute for Defence Studies and Analyses), from 1987 to 2001. In 2001, he founded the think tank Centre for Air Power Studies (CAPS). He served as the director general of CAPS till his death in 2013.

Singh graduated from the National Defence Academy, Pune where he was adjudged the best naval cadet. He was awarded the Binoculars as the Best Sea Cadet as well as the Sword of Honour as a midshipman.

== Naval career ==
Singh was commissioned into the Indian Navy on 1 July 1986. After serving in the Andamans and in Mumbai in his early years, he specialised in Navigation and Direction, topping the Long ND course in 1992. He has served as the navigation officer on most classes of ships - the Khukri-class corvette INS Kuthar, the aircraft carrier INS Viraat (R22) and the Godavari-class frigate INS Gomati (F21). He was also the commissioning navigation officer of the lead ship of her class of guided missile destroyers, INS Delhi (D61).

In early 1999, Singh was appointed staff officer ND of the P-15 Training Team, at Mumbai. Later that year, he was selected to attend the Advanced Command and Staff Course at the Joint Services Command and Staff College (JSCSC), Shrivenham in the United Kingdom. He graduated from JSCSC in 2000, as the Best Overseas Student amongst 90 Army, Navy and Air Force officers from about 50 countries. After returning to India, he was appointed Joint Director of Personnel (JDOP) at naval headquarters. He was promoted to the rank of commander in May 2001. After a three-year tenure as JDOP, he was appointed naval attaché (NA) at the Embassy of India at Tehran, Iran. The Ambassador of India to Iran during his tenure as NA was Krishan Chander Singh.

After his return to India, Singh commanded the Nilgiri-class ASW and UAV-control frigate INS Taragiri (F41). He was promoted to the rank of captain on 1 July 2008. In mid-2008, he took over as the officer-in-charge, Local Work Up Team (West). As OIC-LWT(W), he was responsible for operational sea training of ships. After a short stint, he attended the naval higher command course at the College of Naval Warfare (CNW) in Mumbai. During these stints, he was the lead drafter for the Indian Navy’s Maritime Doctrine, 2009, for which he was awarded Commendation by the chief of the naval staff. For his command of the Taragiri, he was awarded the Nao Sena Medal on 26 January 2009. After graduating from CNW, in June 2009, he took over as the officer-in-charge of his alma mater, the Navigation Direction School.

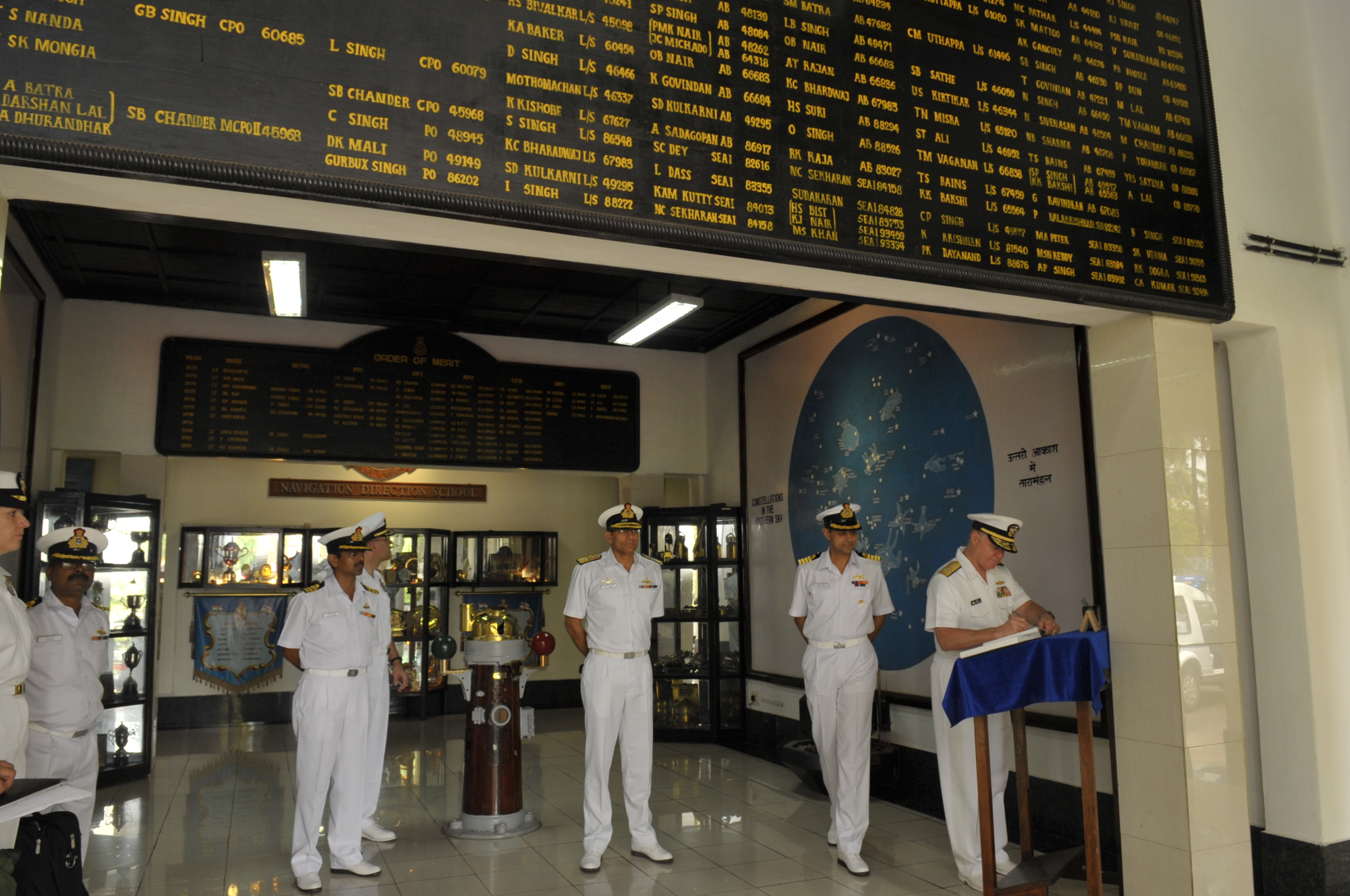
Singh as the OIC ND School during the visit of USN CNO Adm Gary Roughead.

In mid-2010, Singh was appointed commanding officer of the Talwar-class guided missile frigate INS Trishul (F43). After about eighteen months in command, he was selected to attend National Defence College, New Delhi as part of the 52nd course, in the rank of commodore. After completing the year-long course, he was appointed Principal Director Naval Operations at NHQ. Subsequently, he was appointed Principal Director Strategy, Concepts and Transformation (PDSCT), also at NHQ. As the PDSCT, he was the lead drafter of the Strategic Guidance to Transformation, 2015, and the Indian Maritime Security Strategy, 2015.

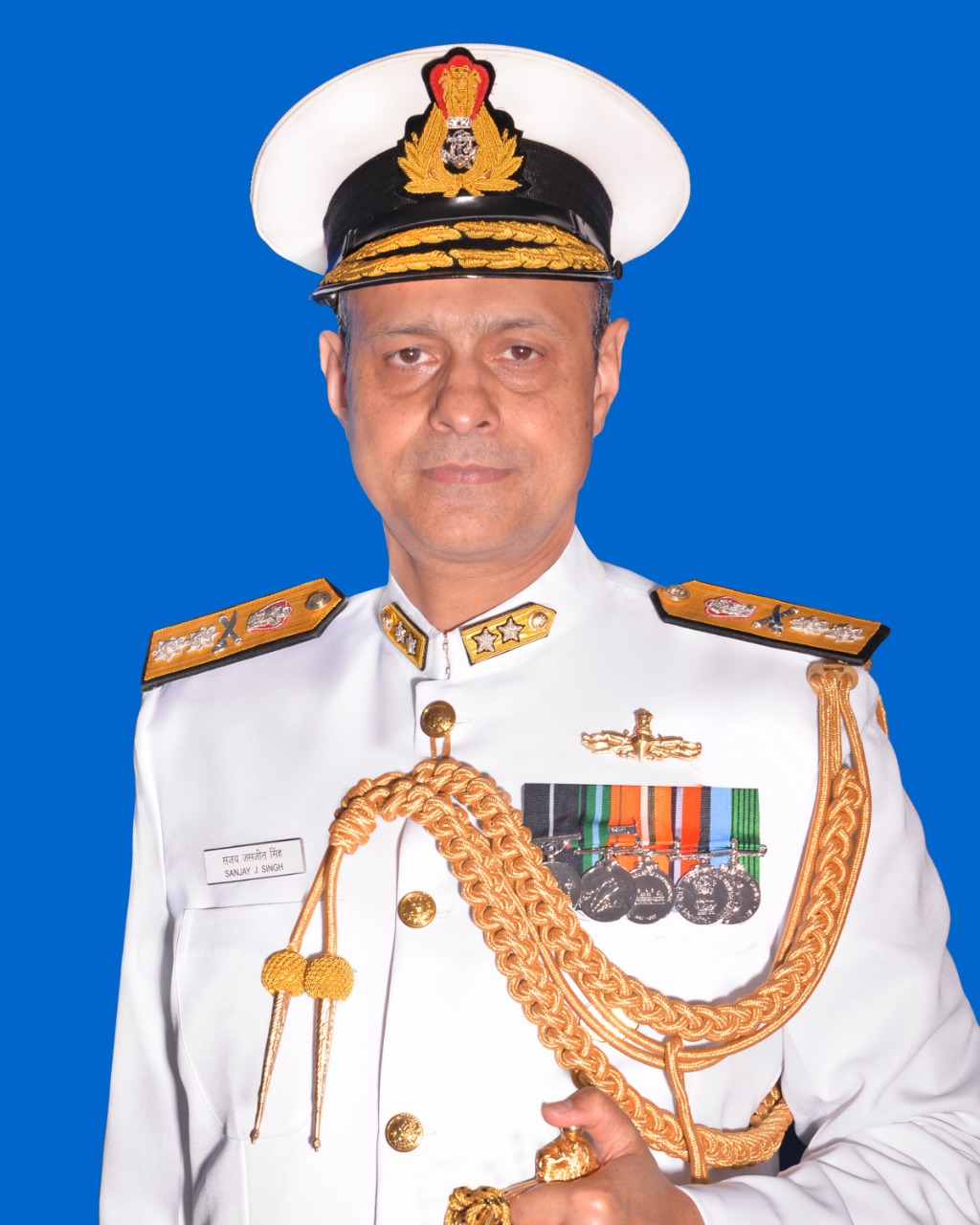
Singh as a Rear Admiral.

=== Flag rank ===
On promotion to Flag rank, on 19 November 2015, Singh took over as the Assistant Chief of Naval Staff (Communication Space and Network Centric Operation) (ACNS (CSNCO)). He was the second officer to hold the newly-created post. On 4 February 2018, he assumed the office of Flag Officer Sea Training (FOST) at Kochi. As FOST, his charter included the conduct of the operational sea training of all ships of the Indian Navy and the Indian Coast Guard. After a year-long tenure as FOST, Singh assumed the office of the Flag Officer Commanding Western Fleet on 22 March 2019. For his command of the Western Fleet, Singh was awarded the Ati Vishisht Seva Medal on 26 January 2020.

On 18 February 2020, Singh took over as the fourth commandant of his alma mater, the Naval War College, Goa. After a one year stint, he was promoted to the rank of vice admiral and appointed Controller of Personnel Services (CPS) at Naval HQ. In August 2021, he was appointed Deputy Chief of Integrated Defence Staff (Operations) at HQ Integrated Defence Staff (IDS).

On 1 April 2023, he was appointed the 37th Vice Chief of the Naval Staff. He had a short term as VCNS. He was appointed as the Flag Officer Commanding-in-Chief Western Naval Command (FOCinC WNC) on 5 December 2023. He assumed the post on 4 January 2024 succeeding Vice Admiral Dinesh K Tripathi who replaced him as the Vice Chief of Naval Staff. During his tenure as FOCinC, the Western Naval Command was involved heavily in the anti-piracy operations in the Gulf of Aden, Operation Sankalp. He also led the command during Operation Sindoor, for which he was awarded the Sarvottam Yudh Seva Medal, the first naval recipient, on 15 August 2025.

== Post-retirement ==
On 1 January 2026, Singh took over as the director general of the United Service Institution (USI). Founded in 1870 by Sir Charles MacGregor, USI is India’s oldest think tank on defence and security.

== Personal life ==
Singh is married to Zarine Lord Singh, a former fashion model. The couple has a daughter, Payal, and a son, Samar.

== Awards and decorations ==
Singh was awarded the Nao Sena Medal in 2009, the Ati Vishisht Seva Medal in 2020, the Param Vishisht Seva Medal on Republic Day 2025 and the Sarvottam Yudh Seva Medal on Independence Day 2025.

Sarvottam Yudh Seva Medal	Param Vishisht Seva Medal	Ati Vishisht Seva Medal	Nau Sena Medal
Samanya Seva Medal	Sainya Seva Medal	75th Anniversary of Independence Medal	50th Anniversary of Independence Medal
30 Years Long Service Medal	20 Years Long Service Medal		9 Years Long Service Medal

== See also ==
- Flag Officer Commanding Western Fleet
- Western Fleet

Military offices
Preceded by Dinesh K Tripathi	Commanding officer INS Trishul; 2007 - 2008	Succeeded by D. S. Gujral
Preceded by K. K. Pandey	Assistant Chief of the Naval Staff (Communication Space and Network Centric Operation); 2015 - 2018	Succeeded by D. S. Gujral
Preceded by M A Hampiholi	Flag Officer Sea Training; 2018 - 2019	Succeeded by Krishna Swaminathan
Preceded by M A Hampiholi	Flag Officer Commanding Western Fleet; 2019 - 2020	Succeeded by Krishna Swaminathan
Preceded by Sandeep Beecha	Commandant Naval War College, Goa; 2020 - 2021	Succeeded by S. Venkat Raman
Preceded by Satish Ghormade	Controller of Personnel Services; 2021 - 2021	Succeeded by Suraj Berry
Preceded by Satish Ghormade	Deputy Chief of the Integrated Defence Staff (Operations); 2021 - 2023	Succeeded by Rajesh Pendharkar
Preceded by Satish Ghormade	Vice Chief of the Naval Staff; 1 April 2023 - 3 January 2024	Succeeded by Dinesh K Tripathi
Preceded by Dinesh K Tripathi	Flag Officer Commanding-in-Chief, Western Naval Command; 4 January 2024 - 31 July 2025	Succeeded by Krishna Swaminathan
