= Dinesh Kumar Tripathi =

Indian Navy admiral

Admiral Dinesh Kumar Tripathi PVSM AVSM NM
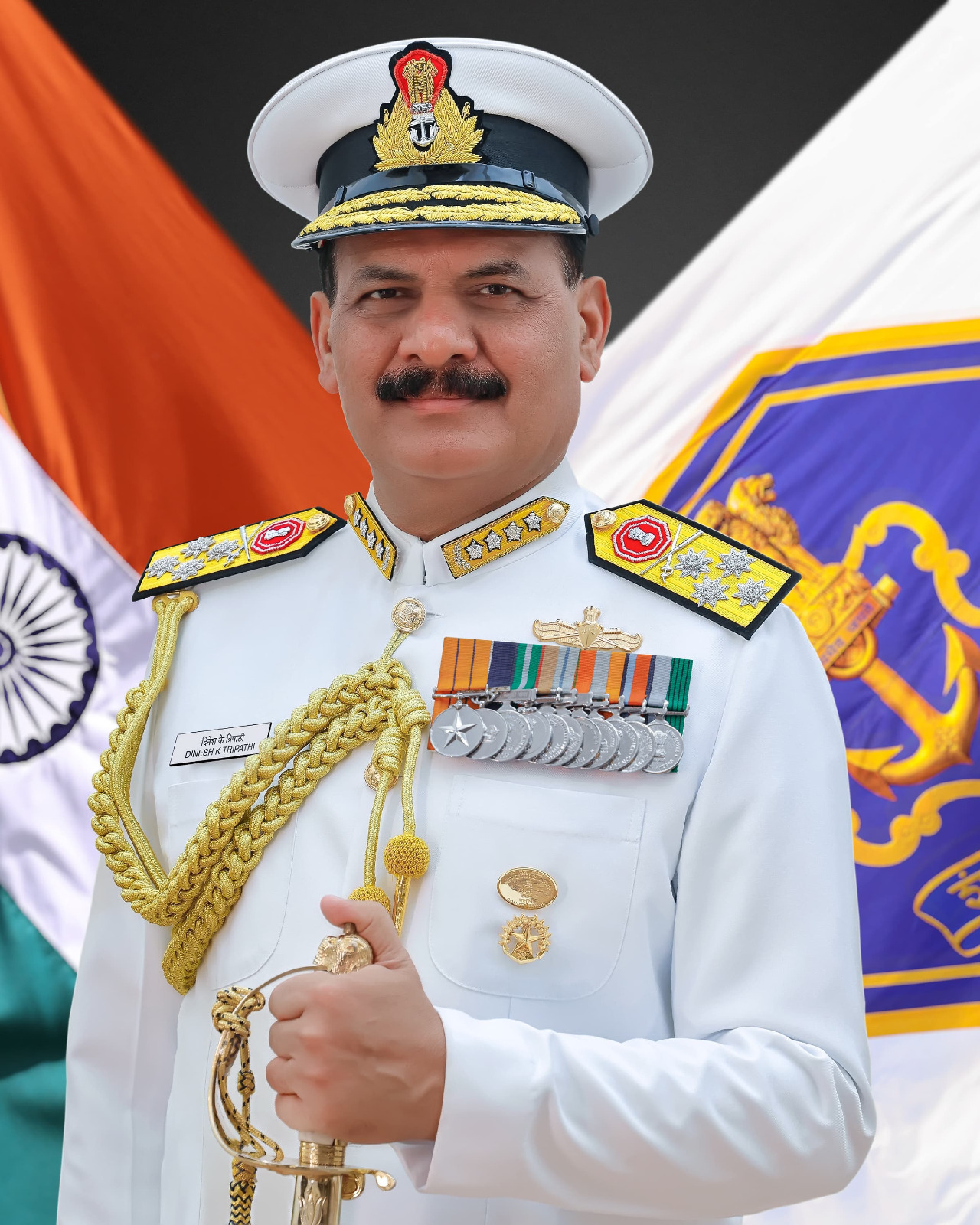
- Official portrait, 2025

26th chief of the naval staff
- In office 30 April 2024 – 31 May 2026
- President: Droupadi Murmu
- Preceded by: R. Hari Kumar
- Succeeded by: Krishna Swaminathan

38th Vice Chief of the Naval Staff
- In office 3 January 2024 – 30 April 2024
- Chief of Naval Staff: R. Hari Kumar
- Preceded by: Sanjay Jasjit Singh
- Succeeded by: Krishna Swaminathan

Flag Officer Commanding-in-Chief Western Naval Command
- In office 1 March 2023 – 2 January 2024
- Preceded by: Ajendra Bahadur Singh
- Succeeded by: Sanjay Jasjit Singh

Personal details
- Born: 15 May 1964 (age 62)
- Spouse: Shashi Tripathi
- Education: Sainik School, Rewa

Military service
- Allegiance: India
- Branch/service: Indian Navy
- Years of service: 1 July 1985 - 31 May 2026
- Rank: Admiral
- Commands: Western Naval Command; Indian Naval Academy; Eastern Fleet; INS Trishul (F43); INS Kirch (P62); INS Vinash (K47)
- Service Number: 02904-Z
- Awards: Param Vishisht Seva Medal; Ati Vishisht Seva Medal; Nau Sena Medal

Admiral Dinesh Kumar Tripathi, PVSM, AVSM, NM (born 15 May 1964) is a retired four star flag officer of the Indian Navy. He last served as 26th chief of the naval staff. He previously served as the 38th vice chief of the naval staff. He earlier served as the Flag Officer Commanding-in-Chief Western Naval Command, prior to that he served as the chief of personnel (COP) and as the director general naval operations (DGNO).

== Early life and education ==
Tripathi is an alumnus of Sainik School, Rewa. He joined Sainik School, Rewa in July 1973 where he was classmates with the former Chief of Army Staff, General Upendra Dwivedi. He is also an alumnus of the National Defence Academy, Pune and the Indian Naval Academy, Ezhimala. He completed the staff course at the Defence Services Staff College, Wellington where he won the Thimayya Medal, and the higher command course at the College of Naval Warfare. He has also attended the Naval War College, Newport, Rhode Island in the United States when he was awarded the Robert E. Bateman International Prize.

== Naval career ==
Tripathi was commissioned into the Executive branch of the Indian Navy on 1 July 1985. He is a specialist in Communication and Electronic warfare. In the early years of his career, he served as the signals communication officer and electronic warfare officer of the guided missile destroyer, INS Mumbai (D62).He has commanded the Veer-class missile vessel INS Vinash (K47) and the Kora-class corvette INS Kirch (P62). He was in command of the Kirch during the Review of the Fleet by the president of India Dr. A. P. J. Abdul Kalam in 2005. He also served as the executive officer of the Delhi-class Guided missile destroyer INS Mumbai (D62). He subsequently commanded the Talwar-class guided missile frigate INS Trishul (F43). In his staff appointments, Admiral Tripathi has served as the fleet operations officer of the Western Fleet and as the director of naval operations. As a commodore, he served as the Principal Director Network Centric Operations and as the Principal Director Naval Plans, both at Naval HQ.

=== Flag rank ===
On promotion to Flag rank, Tripathi took over as the Assistant Chief of Naval Staff (Policy and Plans) at Naval HQ. He then assumed the office of Flag Officer Commanding Eastern Fleet on 15 January 2018. For his command of the Eastern Fleet, he was awarded the Ati Vishisht Seva Medal on 26 January 2019.

On promotion to the rank of vice admiral on 12 June 2019, Tripathi took over as the commandant of Indian Naval Academy from Vice Admiral R. B. Pandit. Under him, the INA was presented with the President's Colour on 20 November 2019. On 13 August 2020, he assumed charge as the Director General Naval Operations (DGNO) at Naval HQ. He served as the DGNO during the COVID-19 pandemic.

Tripathi assumed the charge of chief of personnel succeeding Vice Admiral Ravneet Singh on 1 June 2021. After about 2 years as COP, he was appointed flag officer commanding-in-chief Western Naval Command. He took over from Vice Admiral Ajendra Bahadur Singh on 1 March 2023.

On 4 January 2024, Tripathi took over as the 38th vice chief of the naval staff succeeding Vice Admiral Sanjay Jasjit Singh, who moved to Western Naval Command as the Flag Officer Commanding-in-Chief Western Naval Command.

=== Chief of naval staff ===
On 19 April 2024, the Government of India appointed Tripathi as the next chief of the naval staff. On 30 April 2024, Admiral Dinesh Kumar Tripathi took over as the 26th chief of the naval staff, succeeding Admiral R. Hari Kumar, who superannuated after more than four decades of service to the nation.

== Personal life ==
Tripathi is a keen sportsman and avidly follows tennis, badminton, and cricket. He is a student of international relations, military history, and the art and science of leadership. He is married to Shashi Tripathi, an artist and homemaker. The couple have a son who is a practicing lawyer.

== Awards and decorations ==
For his exemplary service, he has been awarded with the Param Vishisht Seva Medal on 26 January 2024 and the Ati Vishisht Seva Medal on 26 January 2019.

Param Vishisht Seva Medal	Ati Vishisht Seva Medal	Nau Sena Medal	Samanya Seva Medal
Operation Vijay Medal	Operation Parakram Medal	Sainya Seva Medal	75th Independence Anniversary Medal
50th Independence Anniversary Medal	30 Years Long Service Medal	20 Years Long Service Medal	9 Years Long Service Medal

== Dates of Rank ==
Insignia	Rank	Component	Date of rank
	Sub-lieutenant	Indian Navy	1 July 1985
	Lieutenant	Indian Navy	1987
	Lieutenant Commander	Indian Navy	1995
	Commander	Indian Navy	1999
	Captain	Indian Navy	2005
	Commodore	Indian Navy	2013
	Rear Admiral	Indian Navy	15 January 2018
	Vice Admiral	Indian Navy	12 June 2019 1 March 2023 (C-inC)
	Admiral (CNS)	Indian Navy	30 April 2024

== See also ==
- Flag Officer Commanding Eastern Fleet
- Eastern Fleet
- Commandant of Indian Naval Academy

Military offices
Preceded by Ajendra Bahadur Singh	Commanding officer INS Trishul; 2006 - 2007	Succeeded by Sanjay Jasjit Singh
Preceded by Biswajit Dasgupta	Flag Officer Commanding Eastern Fleet; 2018 - 2019	Succeeded by Suraj Berry
Preceded by R. B. Pandit	Commandant, Indian Naval Academy; June 2019 - July 2020	Succeeded by M. A. Hampiholi
Preceded by M. A. Hampiholi	Director General Naval Operations; 2020 - 2021	Succeeded by Rajesh Pendharkar
Preceded by Ravneet Singh	Chief of Personnel; 1 June 2021 – 28 February 2023	Succeeded by Suraj Berry
Preceded by Ajendra Bahadur Singh	Flag Officer Commanding-in-Chief Western Naval Command; 1 March 2023 - 3 January 2024	Succeeded by Sanjay Jasjit Singh
Preceded by Sanjay Jasjit Singh	Vice Chief of the Naval Staff; 4 January 2024 - 30 April 2024	Succeeded by Krishna Swaminathan
Preceded by R. Hari Kumar	Chief of the Naval Staff; 30 April 2024 - Present	Incumbent
