= INS Prahar =

Veer-class corvette of the Indian Navy

History

India
- Name: INS Prahar
- Builder: Goa Shipyard Limited
- Launched: 26 August 1995
- Commissioned: 1 March 1997
- Identification: Pennant number: K98
- Fate: Sunk in collision, in 2006

General characteristics
- Class & type: Veer-class corvette
- Displacement: 455 tons (full load)
- Length: 56 m (184 ft)
- Beam: 10.5 m (34 ft)
- Draught: 2.5 m (8.2 ft)
- Propulsion: COGAG
- Speed: 32 knots (59 km/h)
- Range: 1,650 mi (2,660 km)
- Complement: 41 (incl 5 officers)

INS Prahar (Assault) was a Veer-class corvette of the Indian Navy.

== Operations ==
In October 1999, she assisted the ICGS Tarabai to chase and capture a Panamanian-registered Japanese cargo ship carrying aluminum ingots, MV Alondra Rainbow, that had been hijacked by pirates off Indonesia. The operation took place off the coast of Kochi.

== Collision ==
On 21 April 2006 INS Prahar collided with the container ship MV Rajiv Gandhi, and sank off the coast of Goa. No one was injured in the accident. The commanding officer of the ship, Lieutenant Commander Yogesh Tripathi was found guilty of negligence by an Indian Navy court-martial, and dismissed from service.
