= Western Naval Command =

Indian navy command

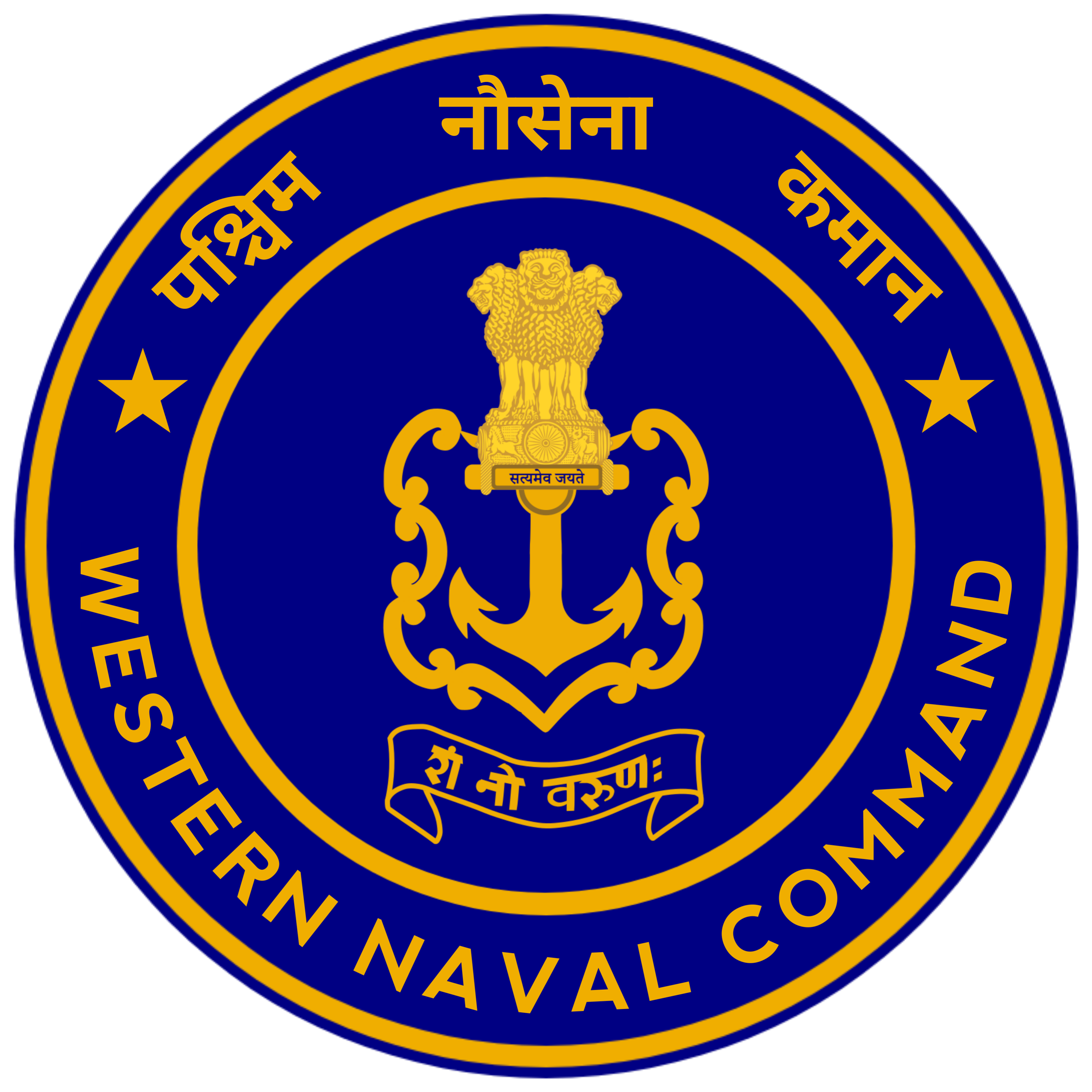
- Crest of the Western Naval Command
- Active: 1968
- Country: India
- Branch: Indian Navy
- Type: Command
- Headquarters: Mumbai, Maharashtra

Commanders
- FOC-in-C: Vice Admiral Sanjay Vatsayan PVSM AVSM NM
- Chief of Staff: Vice Admiral Rahul Vilas Gokhale YSM NM
- FOCWF: Rear Admiral Vivek Dahiya NM

The Western Naval Command is one of the three command–level formations of the Indian Navy. It is headquartered in Mumbai, Maharashtra. As the senior–most of the three formations, the command is responsible for the all naval forces in the Arabian Sea and western parts of the Indian Ocean and the naval establishments on the west coast of India.

The Command was formed on 1 March 1968. The Command is commanded by a Three Star Flag Officer of the rank of Vice Admiral with the title Flag Officer Commanding-in-Chief Western Command (FOC-in-C). Vice Admiral Sanjay Vatsayan is the current FOC-in-C WNC, who took over on 30 May 2025.

== History ==
After the independence and the partition of India on 15 August 1947, the ships and personnel of the Royal Indian Navy were divided between the Dominion of India and the Dominion of Pakistan. The division of the ships was on the basis of two-thirds of the fleet to India, one third to Pakistan. Two new appointments were created, the Rear Admiral Commanding Indian Naval Squadron (RACINS), the commander of the surface fleet of the Navy, and the Commodore-in-Charge Bombay, a one-star officer who headed the shore establishments on the western coast. To bring the service more in line with other navies, on 1 May 1952 the Rear Admiral Commanding Indian Naval Squadron was re-designated Flag Officer Commanding (Flotillas), Indian Fleet,

On 30 December 1957, the office of Flag Officer Commanding (Flotillas) was re-designated Flag Officer Commanding Indian Fleet (FOCIF), while the command of the shore establishments was upgraded to the Two Star appointment of Flag Officer Bombay (FOB) in June 1958. The FOCIF and FOB reported to the Chief of the Naval Staff. On 1 March 1968, the FOB was upgraded to the Three Star of Vice Admiral and was re-designated Flag Officer Commanding-in-Chief Western Naval Command (FOC-in-C WNC). The Indian Fleet was renamed as Western Fleet with the Flag Officer Commanding Western Fleet (FOCWF) reporting into the FOC-in-C WNC.

== Area of responsibility ==
The Western Naval Command (WNC) is the sword arm of the Indian Navy and naval operations conducted on the western seaboard would be central to the outcome of any conflict at sea against Pakistan. The Western Fleet is the two-star level operational formation of the Western Naval Command. It utilises Mumbai and Karwar as its home ports, with INS Kunjali, its HQ in Mumbai. The fleet at the WNC is based under Flag Officer Commanding Maharashtra Naval Area (FOMA) and provides naval defence in the sensitive north Arabian Sea adjacent to Pakistan. INS Kadamba, a large naval base, was constructed under Project Seabird and completed in 2005. This naval base, at Karwar in Karnataka, is used exclusively by the Indian Navy.

== Capabilities ==
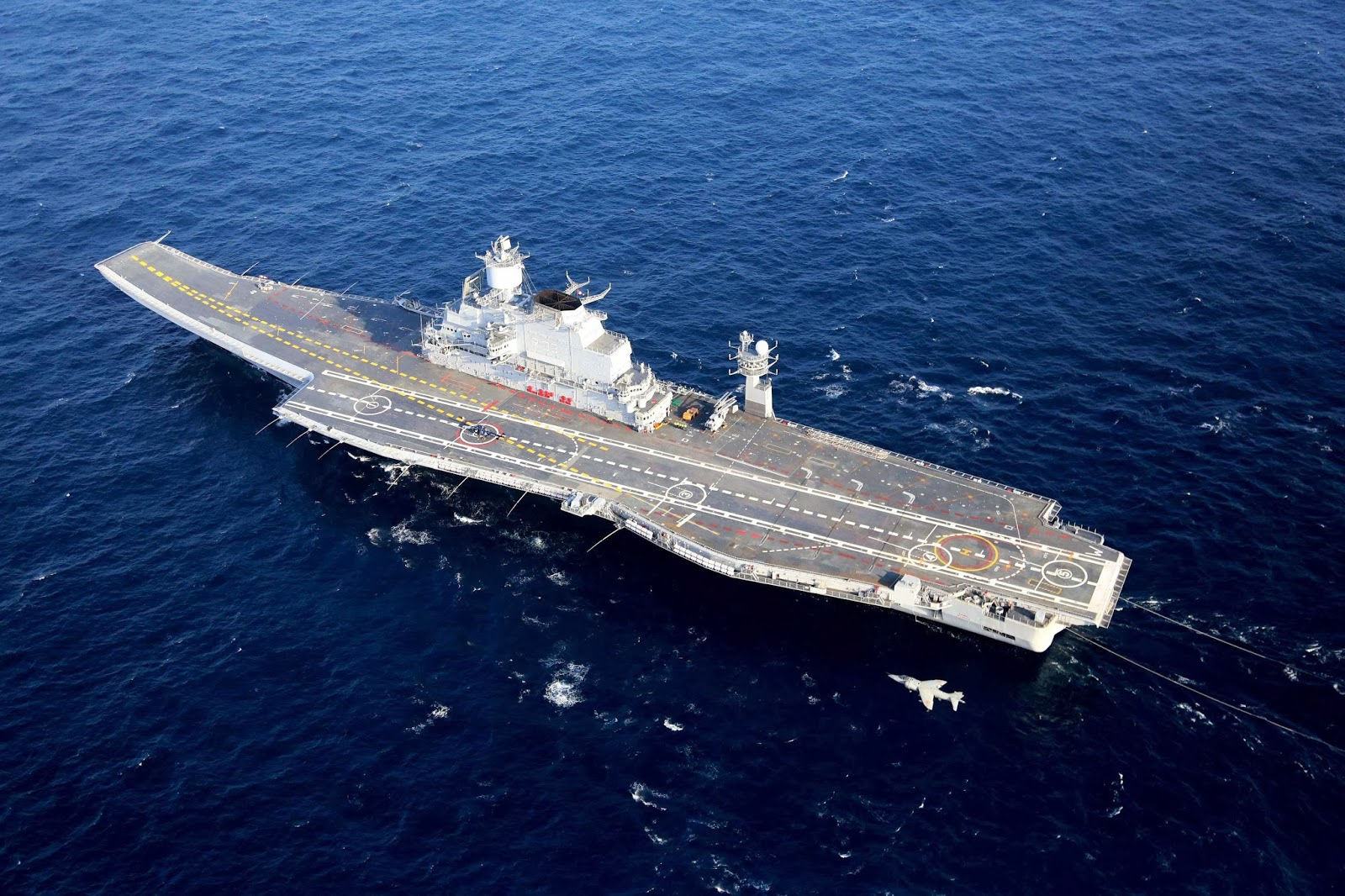
INS Vikramaditya at sea.

The flagship aircraft carrier of the Western Fleet is INS Vikramaditya. The WNC is equipped with submarine pens, a carrier dock and principal maintenance dockyards. The Carrier Battle Group of the Western Fleet consists of Vikramaditya, Visakhapatnam and Kolkata-class destroyers, Talwar and Brahmaputra-class frigates, Mahe and Veer-class corvettes and various types of patrol vessels, fast attack crafts and auxiliary ships. Naval aviation is primarily provided by MiG-29K fighter jets, P-8I maritime patrol aircraft, while Ka-31 and Ka-27, Sea King, and MH-60R form the back of the helicopter fleet. In addition to that it is also the region for various docks and maintenance MRO facilities on the Western and Southern Indian coast.

== Organization ==
The Western Naval Command is organized as follows:

Post	Current Holder	References
Flag Officer Commanding-in-Chief	Vice Admiral Sanjay Vatsayan, PVSM, AVSM, NM	
Chief of Staff	Vice Admiral Rahul Vilas Gokhale, YSM, NM	
Flag Officer Commanding Western Fleet (FOCWF)	Rear Admiral Srinivas Maddula, VSM	
Flag Officer Commanding Maharashtra Naval Area (FOMA)	Rear Admiral Vidhyadhar Harke, VSM	
Flag Officer Goa Area (FOGA) & Flag Officer Naval Aviation (FONA)	Rear Admiral Ajay D. Theophilus	
Flag Officer Commanding Gujarat Naval Area (FOGNA)	Rear Admiral Sritanu Guru	
Flag Officer Commanding Karnataka Naval Area (FOK)	Rear Admiral Vikram Menon, VSM	
Flag Officer Defence Advisory Group (FODAG)	Rear Admiral Rahul Shankar, NM	
Admiral Superintendent Dockyard (ASD) - Mumbai	Rear Admiral Ajay Patney	
Commodore Commanding Submarines (West)	Commodore Sumeet Singh Sodhi	

== Naval bases ==
Naval bases under Western Naval Command are the following

Base	City	State/Territory	Role
INS Dwarka	Okha	Gujarat	Logistics and Maintenance support
INS Sardar Patel	Porbandar	Gujarat	Logistics Support
INS Kadamba	Karwar	Karnataka	Logistics and Maintenance support
INS Vajrakosh	Karwar	Karnataka	Naval ammunition and missile depot
INHS Patanjali	Karwar	Karnataka	Naval Hospital
INS Gomantak	Vasco da gama	Goa	Logistics and Maintenance support
INS Hansa	Dabolim	Goa	Naval Air Station
INHS Jeevanti	Vasco-da-gama	Goa	Naval Hospital
INS Angre	Mumbai	Maharashtra	Logistics and Administrative support
INS Abhimanyu	Mumbai	Maharashtra	MARCOS base
INHS Sandhani	Mumbai	Maharashtra	Naval Hospital
INS Agnibahu	Mumbai	Maharashtra	Missile boat squadron base
INHS Asvini	Mumbai	Maharashtra	Naval Hospital
INS Kunjali	Mumbai	Maharashtra	Naval Air Station
INS Shikra	Mumbai	Maharashtra	Naval Air Station
NH Powai	Mumbai	Maharashtra	Naval Hospital
INS Tanaji	Mumbai	Maharashtra	Naval ammunition depot
INS Trata	Mumbai	Maharashtra	Coastal Missile Defense
INS Tunir	Mumbai	Maharashtra	Naval missile depot
INS Vajrabahu	Mumbai	Maharashtra	Submarine base

== List of Commanders ==
S.No	Name	Assumed office	Left office	Notes	References
Commodore-in-Charge Bombay (COMBAY)
1	Commodore Henry Richmond Inigo-Jones	15 August 1947	31 December 1950	Formerly Royal Indian Navy.	
2	Commodore R. M. T. Taylor	31 December 1950	March 1954	Seconded from the Royal Navy	
3	Commodore Ajitendu Chakraverti	28 March 1954	17 November 1954	First Indian to hold the appointment.	
4	Commodore Adhar Kumar Chatterji	18 November 1954	26 November 1956	Later served as Chief of the Naval Staff.	
5	Commodore Bhaskar Sadashiv Soman	27 November 1956	12 June 1958	Later served as Chief of the Naval Staff.	
Flag Officer Bombay (FOB)
1	Rear Admiral Bhaskar Sadashiv Soman	12 June 1958	15 April 1960	Later Chief of the Naval Staff.	
2	Rear Admiral S. G. Karmarkar MBE	22 April 1960	15 June 1964		
3	Rear Admiral R. S. David	16 June 1964	15 February 1968		
4	Rear Admiral Sardarilal Mathradas Nanda PVSM, AVSM	16 February 1968	28 February 1968	Later Chief of the Naval Staff.	
Flag Officer Commanding-in-Chief Western Naval Command (FOC-in-C WNC)
1	Vice Admiral Sardarilal Mathradas Nanda PVSM, AVSM	1 March 1968	28 February 1970	Later served as Chief of Naval Staff	
2	Vice Admiral Nilakanta Krishnan PVSM, DSC	28 February 1970	24 February 1971		
3	Vice Admiral Sourendra Nath Kohli PVSM	25 February 1971	26 February 1973	Later served as Chief of Naval Staff	
4	Vice Admiral Jal Cursetji PVSM	27 February 1973	28 February 1976	Later served as Chief of Naval Staff	
5	Vice Admiral Ronald Lynsdale Pereira PVSM, AVSM	28 February 1976	20 March 1977	Later served as Chief of Naval Staff	
6	Vice Admiral Rustom K. S. Ghandhi PVSM, VrC	21 March 1977	30 March 1979		
7	Vice Admiral V. E. C. Barboza PVSM, AVSM*	31 March 1979	31 January 1981		
8	Vice Admiral Manohar Prahlad Awati PVSM, VrC	1 February 1981	30 March 1983		
9	Vice Admiral Radhakrishna Hariram Tahiliani PVSM, AVSM	31 March 1983	30 April 1984	Later served as Chief of Naval Staff	
10	Vice Admiral Subimal Mookerjee PVSM	1 May 1984	27 February 1986		
11	Vice Admiral Sukhmal Jain PVSM, AVSM	28 February 1986	31 December 1990		
12	Vice Admiral H. Johnson PVSM, VSM	1 January 1991	31 August 1992		
13	Vice Admiral KASZ Raju PVSM, AVSM, NM	31 August 1992	31 December 1994		
14	Vice Admiral Vishnu Bhagwat PVSM, AVSM	1 January 1995	30 September 1996	Later served as Chief of Naval Staff.	
15	Vice Admiral Avnish Rai Tandon, PVSM, AVSM	24 October 1996	31 March 1998		
16	Vice Admiral Madhvendra Singh PVSM, AVSM	1 April 1998	31 March 2001	Later served as Chief of Naval Staff, and as Chairman of the Chiefs of Staff Committee	
17	Vice Admiral Vinod Pasricha PVSM, AVSM, NM	1 April 2001	31 December 2002		
18	Vice Admiral Arun Prakash PVSM, AVSM, VrC, VSM	1 January 2003	15 October 2003	Later served as Chief of Naval Staff, and as Chairman of the Chiefs of Staff Committee	
19	Vice Admiral Madanjit Singh PVSM, AVSM	16 October 2003	28 February 2006		
20	Vice Admiral Sangram Singh Byce PVSM, AVSM, NM	1 March 2006	31 July 2007		
21	Vice Admiral Jagjit Singh Bedi PVSM, UYSM, AVSM, VSM	1 August 2007	30 April 2009		
22	Vice Admiral Sanjeev Bhasin PVSM, AVSM, VSM	1 May 2009	30 April 2011		
23	Vice Admiral D. K. Joshi PVSM, AVSM, YSM, NM, VSM	1 May 2011	31 August 2012	Later served as Chief of Naval Staff. Current Lieutenant Governor of the Andaman and Nicobar Islands.	
24	Vice Admiral Shekhar Sinha PVSM, AVSM, NM*	1 September 2012	23 April 2, 2014	Retired from the Navy after being superseded.	
25	Vice Admiral Anil Kumar Chopra PVSM, AVSM	1 June 2014	31 March 2015		
26	Vice Admiral S. P. S. Cheema PVSM, AVSM, NM	1 April 2015	31 January 2016	Also headed the Strategic Forces Command and the Southern Naval Command, apart from serving as the Chief of Integrated Defence Staff.	
26	Vice Admiral Sunil Lanba PVSM, AVSM	1 February 2016	31 May 2016	Later served as Chief of Naval Staff, and as Chairman of the Chiefs of Staff Committee	
27	Vice Admiral Girish Luthra PVSM, AVSM, VSM	1 June 2016	31 January 2019		
28	Vice Admiral Ajit Kumar P PVSM, AVSM, VSM	1 February 2019	28 February 2021		
29	Vice Admiral R. Hari Kumar PVSM, AVSM, VSM	28 February 2021	29 November 2021	Later served as Chief of Naval Staff	
30	Vice Admiral Ajendra Bahadur Singh PVSM, AVSM, VSM	30 November 2021	28 February 2023		
31	Vice Admiral Dinesh K Tripathi PVSM, AVSM, NM	1 March 2023	1 January 2024	Later Chief of the Naval Staff	
32	Vice Admiral Sanjay Jasjit Singh SYSM, PVSM, AVSM, NM	2 January 2024	31 July 2025	First Naval recipient of Sarvottam Yudh Seva Medal. Awarded during Operation Sindoor.	
33	Vice Admiral Krishna Swaminathan PVSM, AVSM, VSM	1 August 2025	30 May 2026	Current Chief of the Naval Staff	
34	Vice Admiral Sanjay Vatsayan PVSM, AVSM, NM	30 May 2026	Present	Current FOC-in-C	

== See also ==
- Eastern Naval Command
- Southern Naval Command
