= Flag Officer Defence Advisory Group =

- Flag of the FODAG (Rear Admiral's flag)
- Incumbent; Rear Admiral Rahul Shankar, NM
- Indian Navy
- Abbreviation: FODAG
- Reports to: Flag Officer Commanding-in-Chief Western Naval Command
- Seat: Mumbai
- Formation: 1983

The Flag Officer Defence Advisory Group (FODAG) and Advisor Offshore Security and Defence to the Government of India is the title of the flag officer who heads the Offshore Defence Advisory Group. The FODAG is a two-star officer holding the rank of Rear Admiral.

== History ==
The Oil and Natural Gas Commission (ONGC) discovered an oilfield in the Gulf of Khambhat in the early 1970s, called the Mumbai High Field. Later in the decade, more oilfields were discovered in the western offshore region. These economic assets need to be kept under surveillance and require continuous protection. The Indian Coast Guard (ICG) came into being on 19 August 1978. Among the Coast Guard's charter of duties was the safety and protection of artificial islands and offshore terminals.

The responsibilities for the safety and protection of the offshore installations were discussed between the Indian Navy, ONGC and the Indian Coast Guard. As a result, an offshore security coordination committee (OSCC) was established in 1978. Subsequently, on 31 December 1983, an Off shore Defence Advisory Group (ODAG) was established. The ODAG was to be headed by a Rear Admiral designated Flag Officer Defence Advisory Group (FODAG). The FODAG would plan and advise the Navy and ONGC on the security and defence of the offshore installations.

On 25 June 2002, offshore defence advisory cells were established at Visakhapatnam and New Delhi. The FODAG was re-christened Flag Officer Defence Advisory Group and Adviser Offshore Security and Defence to the Government of India.

== Functions and role ==
The ODAG is the nodal agency for all interaction with ONGC and other oil exploration and production companies regarding the defence of offshore installations within the Maritime zones of India. The FODAG comes under the administrative control of the Flag Officer Commanding-in-Chief Western Naval Command. The functions of the FODAG are:

- To advise the Government of India including the Ministries of Defence, Petroleum & Natural Gas and Shipping and Civil Aviation through the Chief of the Naval Staff on all planning and policy aspects of offshore security and defence covering territorial waters, the continental shelf, the Exclusive Economic Zone and other Maritime Zones of India as defined in the Maritime Zones of India Act, 1981.
- To exercise command and control over mobile forces and static defences in the defence of offshore installations, as directed by the respective Commanders -in-Chief.
- To monitor mercantile traffic for transit through recommended routes/ fairways in the vicinity of offshore areas, in coordination with the concerned civil authorities.
- To inspect vessels engaged in offshore work, for the purpose of ascertaining compliance with the security clearance accorded by competent authority.
- To serve as a member of Offshore Security Coordination Committee (OSCC), headed by the Director General of the Indian Coast Guard.
- Serve as the chairman of the Joint Venture Offshore Protection Advisory Committee (JVOPAC), a sub-committee of the OSCC and a forum to facilitate the exchange of security and offshore issues between the OSCC and the offshore joint venture/private oil companies, as they do not have representation in OSCC.

== See also ==
- Indian Coast Guard

== Bibliography ==
- Singh, Anup (2018), Blue Waters Ahoy!, The Indian Navy 2001-2010, HarperCollins Publishers India, ISBN 9789353025526
- Hiranandani, G.M. (2010), Transition to Guardianship: The Indian Navy 1991-2000, Lancer Publishers, ISBN 9781935501268
- Hiranandani, G M (2005), Transition to eminence : the Indian navy 1976-1990, Lancer Publishers, ISBN 978-8170622666
