= Veer-class corvette =

Class of Indian warships

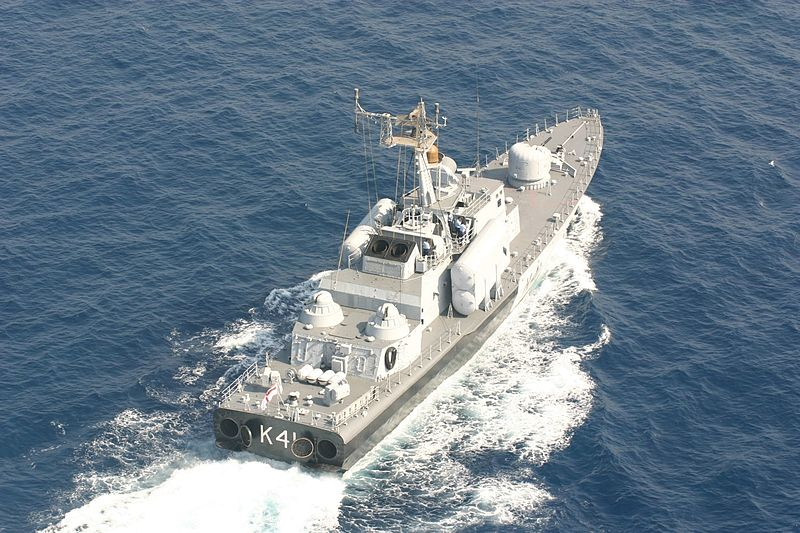
- INS Nirbhik

Class overview
- Name: Veer class
- Builders: Mazagon Dock Limited; Goa Shipyard Limited
- Operators: Indian Navy
- Preceded by: Abhay class by antecedence; Durg class by role
- Succeeded by: Khukri class
- Planned: 15
- Completed: 13
- Cancelled: 2
- Active: 7
- Lost: 1
- Retired: 5
- Preserved: 1

General characteristics
- Type: Corvette
- Displacement: 455 tons or; 477 tons (K91 and K92)
- Length: 56.1 m (184 ft)
- Beam: 11.5 m (38 ft)
- Draught: 2.5 m (8 ft 2 in)
- Propulsion: COGAG: 2 × Nikolayev Type DR77 (DS71 in K92) gas turbine, 16,016 PS (11,780 kW); 2 × Nikolayev Type DR76 gas turbines, 4,993 PS (3,672 kW) coupled to two shafts
- Speed: 36 knots (67 km/h; 41 mph)
- Range: 2,000 nmi (3,700 km; 2,300 mi) at 20 kn (37 km/h); 400 nmi (740 km; 460 mi) at 36 kn (67 km/h)
- Complement: 41 (5 officers)
- Sensors & processing systems: Granit Garpun B (NATO: Plank Shave) E-band air and surface search radar or MR-352 (NATO: Cross Dome) E/F-band air and surface search radar (K91 and K92); Mius I-band navigation radar; MR-123 (NATO: Bass Tilt) H/I-band fire control radar or BEL Lynx fire control radar (K91 and K92); BEL Aparna fire control radar
- Armament: 4 × P-15 Termit (NATO: SS-N-2D Mod 1 Styx) missiles or; 16 × Kh-35 Uran (NATO: SS-N-25) missiles (K91 and K92) or; 4 × BrahMos missiles (K48); 1 quad SA-N-5 Grail launcher for air defence missiles; 1 × 76 mm 60-cal main gun or 1 × 76 mm 62-cal OTO Melara 76 mm Super Rapid gun (K91 and K92); 2 × AK-630 30 mm gun

The Veer-class corvettes of the Indian Navy are a customised Indian variant of the Soviet Tarantul class. They form the 22nd Missile Vessel Squadron (Killer Squadron).

== Service history ==
Eight vessels of this class inherit their names from the 25th Killer missile boat squadron, which attacked and sank two destroyers, a minesweeper and various other support vessels off Karachi during Operation Trident and Operation Python of the Indo-Pakistani War of 1971.

The last two vessels of this class were built as the upgraded Tarantul V with 16 SS-N-25 'Switchblade' / URAN E Missiles, 1 OTO Melara 76 mm instead of the AK-176, and MR 352 Positiv-E (NATO: Cross Dome) Radar.

On 28 April 2016, INS Veer and INS Nipat were the first Veer-class corvettes to be decommissioned from the Indian Navy.

By December 2025, INS Vidyut (K48) have been equipped with two inclined twin BrahMos launchers while the remaining in-service Veer-class corvettes are also expected to be equipped with the weapon system. The pair of launchers were transferred from INS Rajput (D51), which is now retired. Another pair of launchers from Rajput could also be used to equip another corvette of the class. In October 2026, the Ministry of Defence signed a contract to refit two Rajput-class destroyers along with two more Veer-class corvettes with BrahMos launchers and fire-control systems, replacing the Styx inclined launchers in the bow.

== Ships of the class ==
Name	Pennant	Builder	Laid down	Launched	Commissioned	Decommissioned	Status
INS Veer	K40	Volodarski, Rybinsk	1984	October 1986	26 March 1987	28 April 2016	Decommissioned
INS Nirbhik	K41	Volodarski, Rybinsk	1985	October 1987	21 December 1987	11 January 2018	Decommissioned
INS Nipat	K42	Volodarski, Rybinsk	1986	November 1988	5 December 1988	28 April 2016	Decommissioned
INS Nishank	K43	Volodarski, Rybinsk	1987	June 1989	2 September 1989	3 June 2022	Decommissioned, preserved at NHMC, Lothal, India
INS Nirghat	K44	Volodarski, Rybinsk	1988	March 1990	4 June 1990	11 January 2018	Decommissioned
INS Vibhuti	K45	Mazagon Dock Limited	28 September 1987	26 April 1990	3 June 1991		Active
INS Vipul	K46	Mazagon Dock Limited	29 February 1988	3 January 1991	16 March 1992		Active
INS Vinash	K47	Goa Shipyard Limited	30 January 1989	24 January 1992	20 November 1993		Active
INS Vidyut	K48	Goa Shipyard Limited	27 May 1990	12 December 1992	16 January 1995		Active
INS Nashak	K83	Mazagon Dock Limited	21 January 1991	12 November 1993	29 December 1994		Active
INS Prahar	K98	Goa Shipyard Limited	28 August 1992	26 August 1995	1 March 1997		Sunk in collision on 22 April 2006
INS Prabal	K92	Mazagon Dock Limited	31 August 1998	28 September 2000	11 April 2002		Active
INS Pralaya	K91	Goa Shipyard Limited	14 November 1998	14 December 2000	18 December 2002		Active

=== INS Veer ===
INS Veer was the lead ship of her class and served in the Indian Navy from 26 March 1987 to 28 April 2016. INS Veer was commissioned at Poti, Soviet Union (now in Georgia) on 26 March 1987. Lieutenant Commander Anup Singh was the commissioning Commanding Officer of the ship. The ship has also been forward deployed off the coast of Gujarat, and India's maritime border on numerous occasions to protect offshore assets. After completing 29 years of commissioned service, INS Veer was decommissioned on 28 April 2016. At the time of decommissioning, the ship's commanding officer was Cdr B Charish K Pal, and the ship was assigned to the 22nd Killer Squadron. Veer and Nipat, which was also decommissioned on the same day, were the first Veer class corvettes to be decommissioned from the Indian Navy.

=== INS Nirbhik ===
INS Nirbhik served in the Indian Navy from 21 December 1987 to 11 January 2018. She was commissioned at Poti, Soviet Union (now in Georgia) on 21 December 1987 with Commander V R Naphade as the commissioning Commanding Officer. During her three decades of service, she was forward deployed along the Gujarat coast for patrolling and she participated in numerous operations including Operation Parakram and Operation Vijay. The ship was decommissioned at Naval Dockyard in Mumbai on 11 January 2018 and her decommissioning Commanding Officer was Commander Anand Mukundan.

=== INS Nipat ===
INS Nipat served in the Indian Navy from 5 December 1988 to 28 April 2016. INS Nipat was commissioned at Poti, Soviet Union (now in Georgia) on 5 December 1988. Lieutenant Commander GV Babu was the commissioning Commanding Officer of the ship. The ship was crewed by a complement of about 100 officers and sailors. The ship was propelled by four gas turbine engines, and was designed to attain a maximum speed of 42 knots. These ships were designed to carry four Surface to Surface Guided Missiles, one Medium Range Anit-Aircraft Gun (an AK 176) and a Close in Weapon System with two AK 630 Guns and associated Radar. The original INS Nipat served as a frontrunner, alongside sister ship INS Veer during the naval offensive on Karachi harbour in the Indo-Pakistani War of 1971. The ship has also been forward deployed off the coast of Gujarat, and India's maritime border on numerous occasions to protect offshore assets. After completing 28 years of commissioned service, INS Nipat was decommissioned on 28 April 2016. At the time of decommissioning, the ship's commanding officer was Cdr D Chakrapani, and the ship was assigned to the 22nd Killer Squadron. Nipat and Veer, which was also decommissioned on the same day, were the first Veer class corvettes to be decommissioned from the Indian Navy.

=== INS Nirghat ===
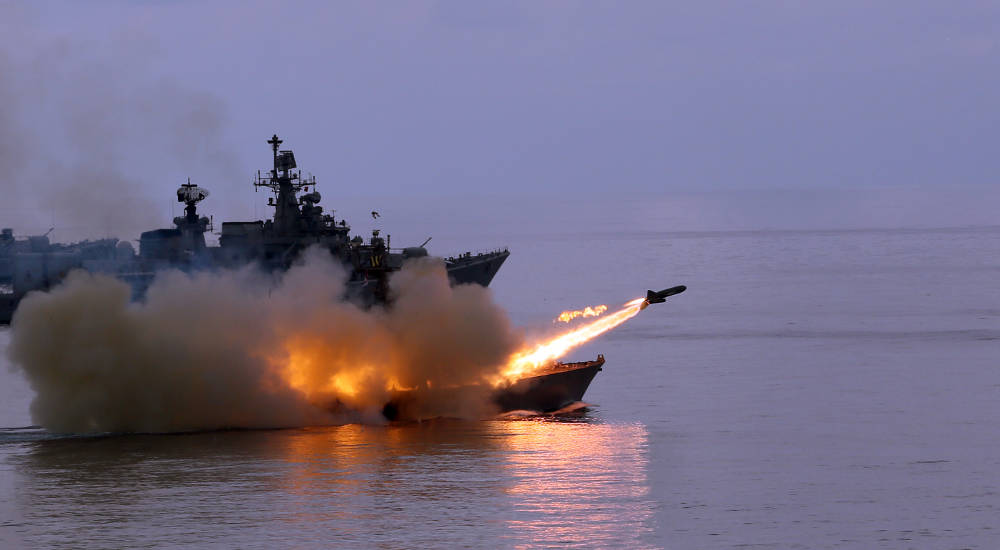
INS Nirghat firing a surface to surface missile during the Combined Commanders' Conference 2015.

INS Nirghat served in Indian Navy from 15 December 1989 to 11 January 2018. She was commissioned at Poti, Soviet Union (now in Georgia) on 15 December 1989 with Commodore S Mampully as the commissioning Commanding Officer. During her three decades of service, she was forward deployed along the Gujarat coast for patrolling and she participated in numerous operations including Operation Parakram and Operation Vijay. The ship was decommissioned at Naval Dockyard in Mumbai on 11 January 2018 and her last Commanding Officer was Commander Mohammed Ikram.

=== INS Pralaya ===
INS Pralaya is currently in active service with the Indian Navy. INS Pralaya is an upgraded Veer class corvette of the Indian Navy, the Veer class are based on the Tarantul Class (Project 1241.1) with the last vessels being based on the Project 1241.8. The INS Pralaya (K91) was Laid Down on 2 May 1998, Launched on 14 December 2000, and commissioned on 18 December 2002. She was built at the Goa Ship Yard from plating and a CKD (Completely Knocked Down) kit supplied by the Russians. Her sister ship the INS Prabal (K92) is of the same configuration but was built by Mazagaon Docks Limited. Modified with Russian input, the weapons & sensor fit is similar to that of the Project 25A Class corvette, INS Kirch. Radars include a MR 352 Positiv-E radar, a Garpun Bal E, MR-123 AK-630 directors and a BEL Lynx gunfire control radar. The vessel is armed with four KT-184 quad launchers for the sixteen 3M24E anti-ship missiles with a range of 130 km. The AK-176 of the original Tarantul has been replaced by an Oto Melara 76/62 Compact, the vessel also has two AK-630s and one Strela 2M MANPAD with 12 reloads for air defence.

== Surviving ships ==
One Veer-class corvette has been preserved as of September 2024.

INS Nishank (K43) was transferred to the National Maritime Heritage Complex, Lothal, India in 2023 following her decommissioning in June 2022. She is now open for visitors at the museum.

== See also ==
- List of active Indian Navy ships
- List of ships of the Indian Navy
