= Karambir Singh =

Retired Indian navy admiral

Admiral Karambir Singh PVSM AVSM ADC
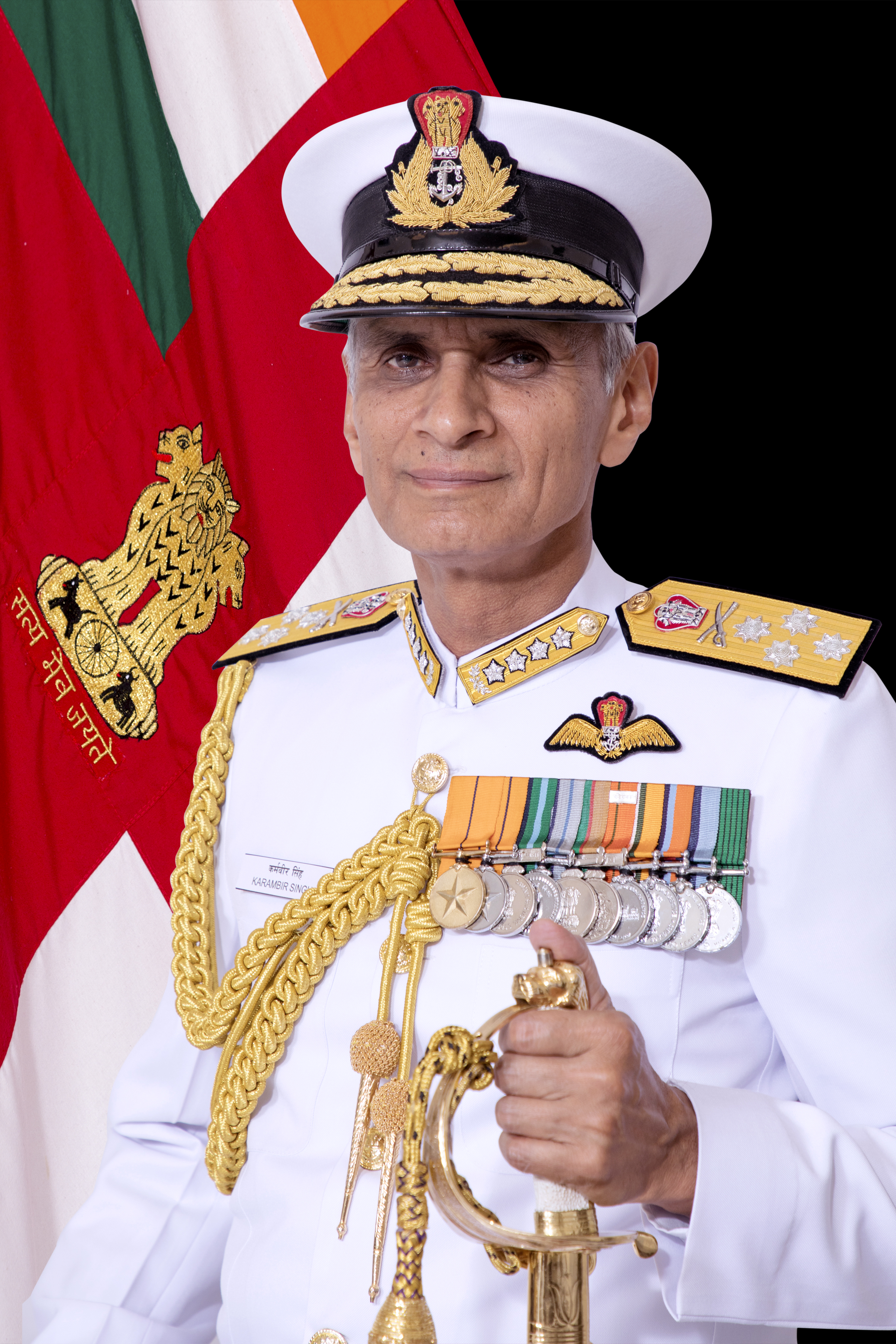
- Official portrait, 2019

24th Chief of the Naval Staff
- In office 31 May 2019 – 30 November 2021
- President: Ram Nath Kovind
- Prime Minister: Narendra Modi
- Preceded by: Sunil Lanba
- Succeeded by: R. Hari Kumar

33rd Vice Chief of the Naval Staff
- In office 31 May 2016 – 30 October 2017
- President: Ram Nath Kovind
- Prime Minister: Narendra Modi
- Preceded by: Parasurama Naidu Murugesan
- Succeeded by: Ajit Kumar P

Personal details
- Born: 3 November 1959 (age 66) Jalandhar, Punjab, India
- Education: National Defence Academy (BTech); Defence Services Staff College (MSc)
- Awards: Param Vishisht Seva Medal; Ati Vishist Seva Medal
- Nickname: "KB"

Military service
- Allegiance: India
- Branch/service: Indian Navy
- Years of service: June 1980 - November 2021
- Rank: Admiral
- Commands: Chief of the Naval Staff; Vice Chief of the Naval Staff; Eastern Naval Command; Naval Air Station, Mumbai; INS Delhi; INS Rana; INS Vijaydurg; ICGS Chand Bibi
- Service number: 02151-N

Admiral Karambir Singh, PVSM, AVSM, ADC (born 3 November 1959), is a former flag officer of Indian Navy, who served as the 24th Chief of the Naval Staff (CNS). The "Grey Eagle" (senior-most serving naval aviator) of the Navy, he replaced Admiral Sunil Lanba as the CNS after his retirement on 31 May 2019. Prior to his appointment, Admiral Singh served as the Vice Chief of the Naval Staff and Flag Officer Commanding-in-Chief, Eastern Naval Command.

== Early life and education ==
Born on 3 November 1959 in Jalandhar, Punjab, Admiral Singh is a second generation military officer. He attended the Barnes School in Deolali, before joining the 56th course of the National Defence Academy, where he was in the Hunter Squadron. He is an alumnus of the Defence Services Staff College, Wellington and the College of Naval Warfare, Mumbai.

== Career ==
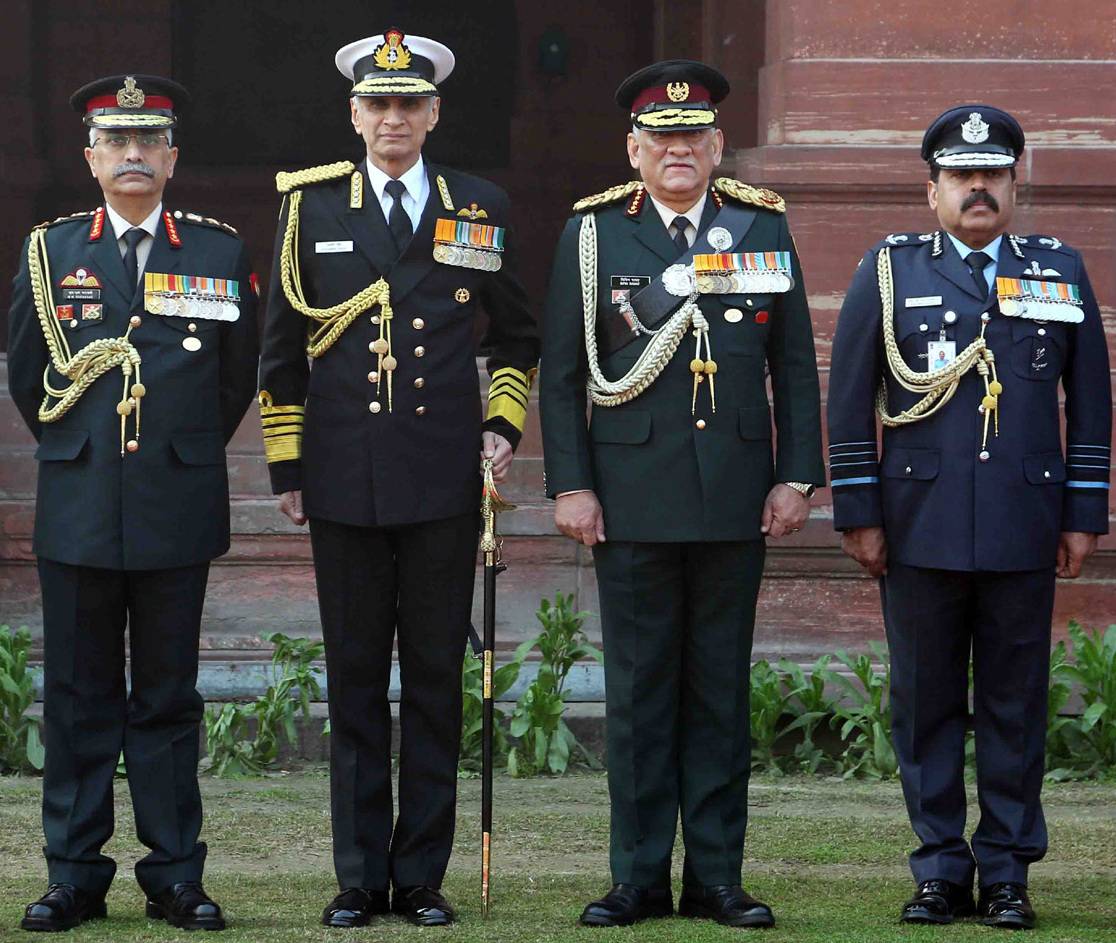
CDS General Bipin Rawat with COAS General Manoj Mukund Naravane, CNS Admiral Karambir Singh and CAS Air Chief Marshal R.K.S. Bhadauria after the ceremonial Guard of Honour, in New Delhi on January 1, 2020

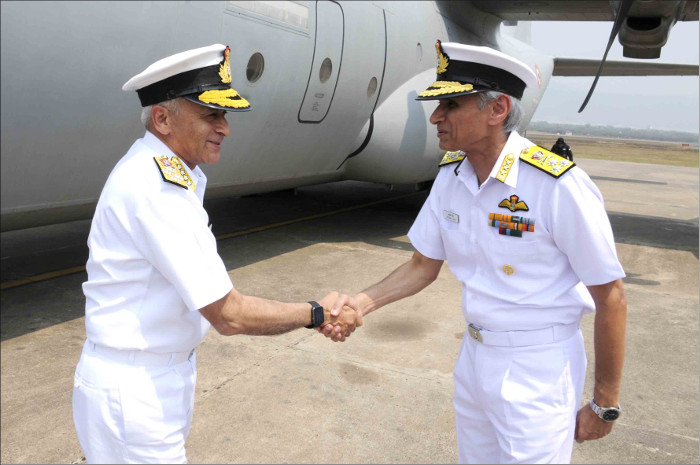
Admiral Sunil Lanba the Chief of the Naval Staff being received by Vice Adm. Karambir Singh FOC-in-Chief ENC

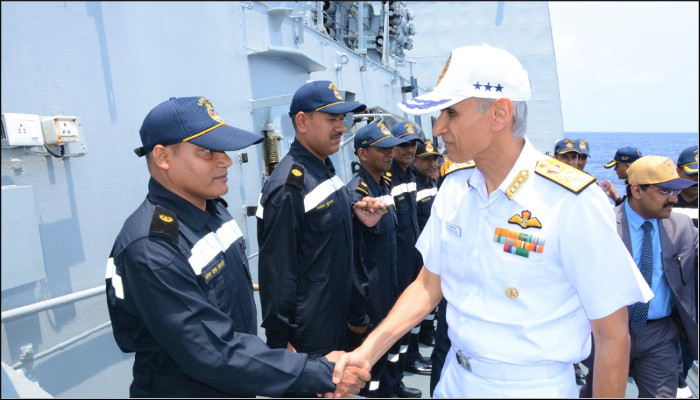
Indian Navy Vice Admiral Karambir Singh visits INS Sahyadri off the coast of Hawaii

He was commissioned into the Indian Navy in July 1980 and earned his wings as a helicopter pilot in 1982. He has extensive experience with the HAL Chetak, Kamov Ka-25 and Kamov Ka-28 helicopters.

Singh has commanded the Jija Bai-class patrol vessel of the Indian Coast Guard ICGS Chand Bibi and the lead ship of her-class of corvettes INS Vijaydurg (K71) and the Rajput-class guided missile destroyer INS Rana (D52). He was in command of the Rana during the Review of the Fleet by the President of India Dr. A. P. J. Abdul Kalam in 2005. During the review, Rana served as the flag ship of the Flag Officer Commanding Eastern Fleet Rear Admiral Sanjeev Bhasin. He subsequently commanded the lead ship of her-class of guided missile destroyers, INS Delhi (D61).

In his staff appointments, he served as the Fleet Operations Officer of the Western Fleet and served at Naval Headquarters as the Joint Director Naval Air Staff. He also served as the Captain Air and Officer-in-Charge of the Naval Air Station at Mumbai. He was also a member of the Aircrew Instrument Rating and Categorisation Board (AIRCATS).

=== Flag rank ===
On promotion to flag rank, Singh was appointed the Chief of Staff, Eastern Naval Command. His other important flag appointments include Chief of Staff of the Tri-Services Unified Command at Andaman & Nicobar Islands and as the Flag Officer Commanding Maharashtra and Gujarat Naval Area (FOMAG). As the Director General Project Seabird, he stewarded the development of the Navy's new base at Karwar. He went on serve as the Deputy Chief of the Naval Staff, following which he was appointed as Vice Chief of Naval Staff.

He assumed office of the Flag Officer Commanding-in-Chief Eastern Naval Command on 31 October 2017, succeeding Vice Admiral Harish Bisht. In a career spanning close to 39 years, he has been awarded the Param Vishist Seva Medal and the Ati Vishist Seva Medal.

On 23 March 2019, the Government of India named him the Chief of Naval Staff, superseding Vice Admiral Bimal Verma. He is the first helicopter pilot to have served as Chief of Staff of the Indian Navy.

He superannuated on 30 November 2021, and was succeeded as Chief of Naval Staff by Vice Admiral R. Hari Kumar.

=== Bilateral visits as CNS ===
Country	Date	Purpose	Reference
Australia	2–6 September 2019	Bilateral discussions and pacific strategic dialogue.	
New Zealand	2–6 September 2019	Bilateral discussions and pacific strategic dialogue.	
Bangladesh	21–24 September 2019	Consolidate and enhance the bilateral maritime relations between India and Bangladesh, with a focus on the Bay of Bengal.	
Sri Lanka	19–22 December 2019	To enhance the bilateral maritime relations in the Indian Ocean Region.	

== Awards and decorations ==
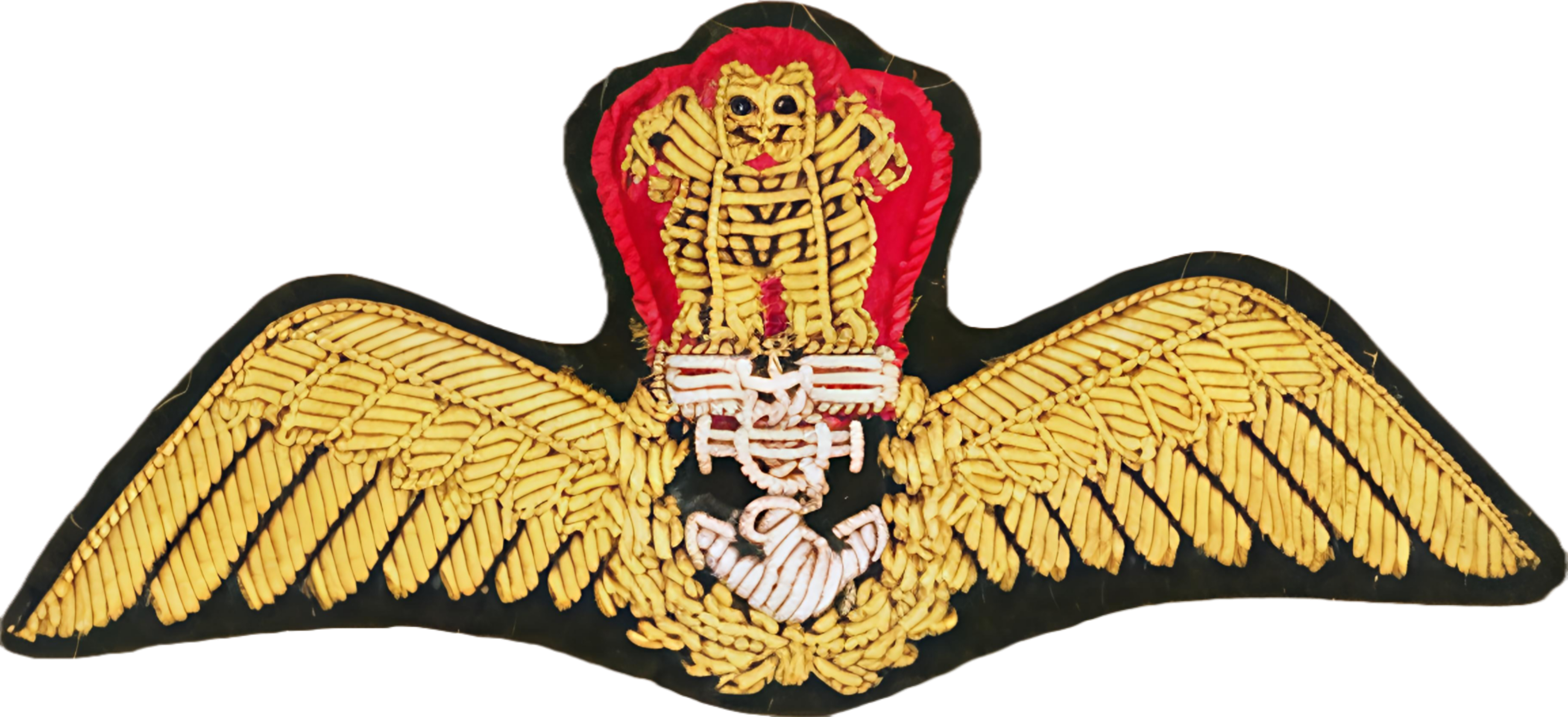

Pilot badge
Param Vishist Seva Medal	Ati Vishist Seva Medal	Samanya Seva Medal	Operation Vijay Medal
Operation Parakram Medal	Sainya Seva Medal	50th Anniversary of Independence Medal	30 Years Long Service Medal
20 Years Long Service Medal		9 Years Long Service Medal	

Singh was conferred with the Order of the Rising Sun, Gold and Silver Star of Japan on 29 April 2023 as a part of the 2023 Spring Conferment of Decorations. He was conferred the order in recognition of his contributions to strengthening the relationship between Japan and India on national defense.

Military offices
Preceded by Major General N. P. Padhi	Chief of Staff, Andaman and Nicobar Command; 2011 - 2012	Succeeded by Rear Admiral Sudhir Pillai
Preceded by Bimal Verma	Flag Officer Commanding Maharashtra and Gujarat Naval Area; 2012 - 2013	Succeeded by G. Ashok Kumar
Preceded by C. S. Murthy	Director General Project Seabird; 2013 - 2015	Succeeded by Murlidhar Sadashiv Pawar
Preceded by Rama Kant Pattanaik	Deputy Chief of Naval Staff; 2015 - 2016	Succeeded by G. Ashok Kumar
Preceded by Parasurama Naidu Murugesan	Vice Chief of Naval Staff; 31 May 2016 – 30 October 2017	Succeeded by Ajit Kumar
Preceded by Harish Bisht	Flag Officer Commanding-in-Chief Eastern Naval Command; 31 October 2017 – 30 May 2019	Succeeded by Atul Kumar Jain
Preceded by Sunil Lanba	Chief of Naval Staff; 31 May 2019 - 30 November 2021	Succeeded by R. Hari Kumar
