= L16 =

L16 or L-16 may refer to:

== Vehicles ==
Aircraft

- Aeronca L-16, a United States Army liaison aircraft
- Albatros L.16, a German biplane
- Hansa-Brandenburg L.16, an Austro-Hungarian triplane
- L16, a United States Navy L-class blimp

Ships

- HDMS Absalon (L16), a frigate of the Royal Danish Navy
- HMS L16, submarine of the Royal Navy
- HMS Stevenstone (L16), a destroyer of the Royal Navy
- INS Shardul (L16), an amphibious assault ship of the Indian Navy
- Soviet submarine L-16, a Leninets-class submarine

== Other uses ==
- L16 81mm mortar, a British standard mortar
- Lectionary 16, a 12th-century Greek manuscript of the New Testament
- Meadowlark Airport, in Huntington Beach, California
- Nissan L16 engine, an automobile engines
- L16, an RTP payload format
