= Murlidhar Sadashiv Pawar =

Vice Admiral Murlidhar Sadashiv Pawar PVSM, AVSM, VSM
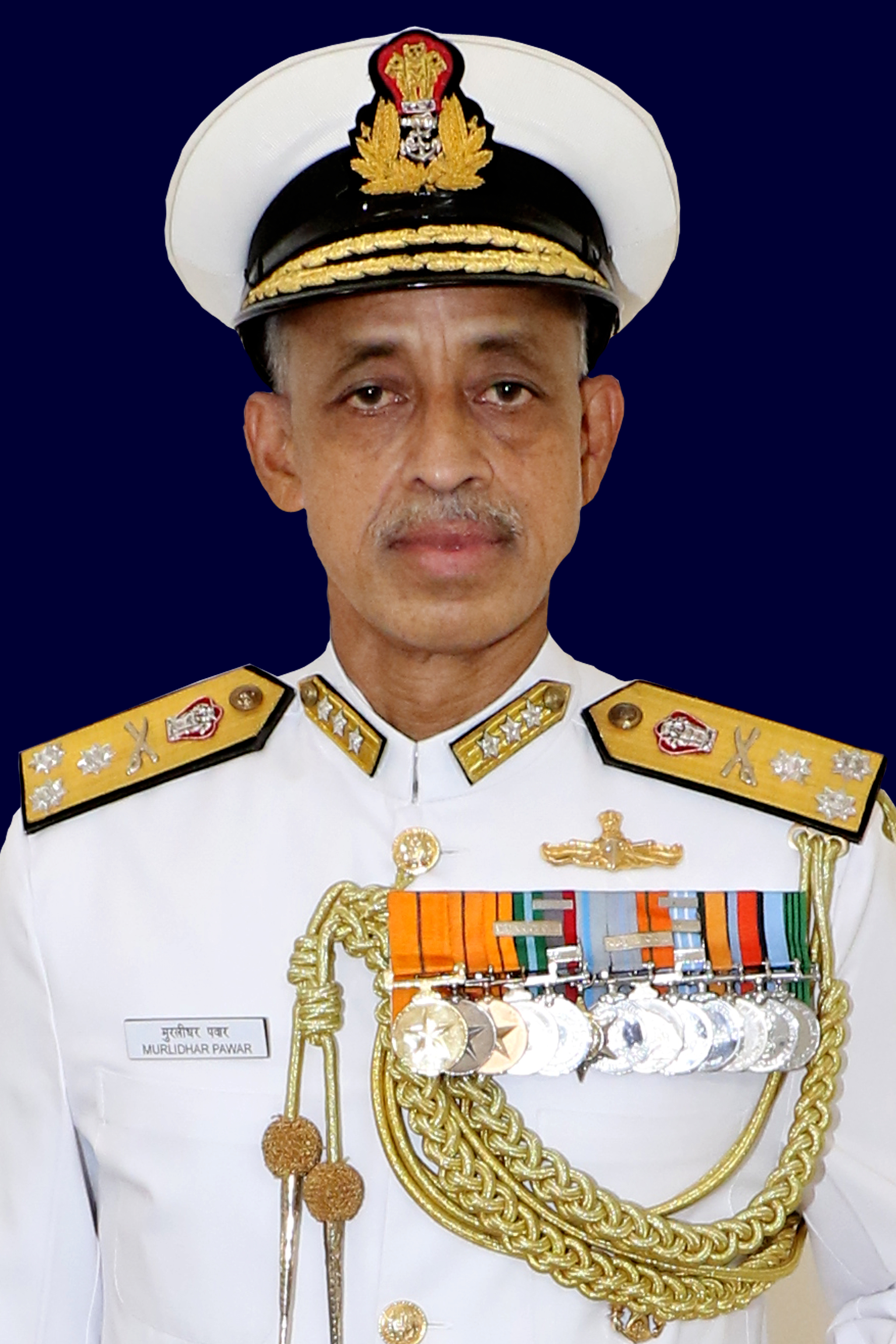
- Spouse: Mrs. Meena Pawar
- Military career
- Allegiance: India
- Branch: Indian Navy
- Service years: 1 July 1982 - 31 May 2021
- Rank: Vice Admiral
- Commands: Project Seabird; Gujarat Naval Area; INS Nashak; INS Kuthar; INS Talwar
- Conflicts: Kargil War
- Awards: Param Vishisht Seva Medal; Ati Vishisht Seva Medal; Vishisht Seva Medal

Vice Admiral Murlidhar Sadashiv Pawar, PVSM, AVSM, VSM is a retired officer of the Indian Navy. He served as the Deputy Chief of the Naval Staff. He assumed office from Vice Admiral G Ashok Kumar on 30 January 2019 and served till 31 May 2021 till his retirement. He is succeeded by Vice Admiral Ravneet Singh. Prior to this appointment, he served as chief of staff, Eastern Naval Command.

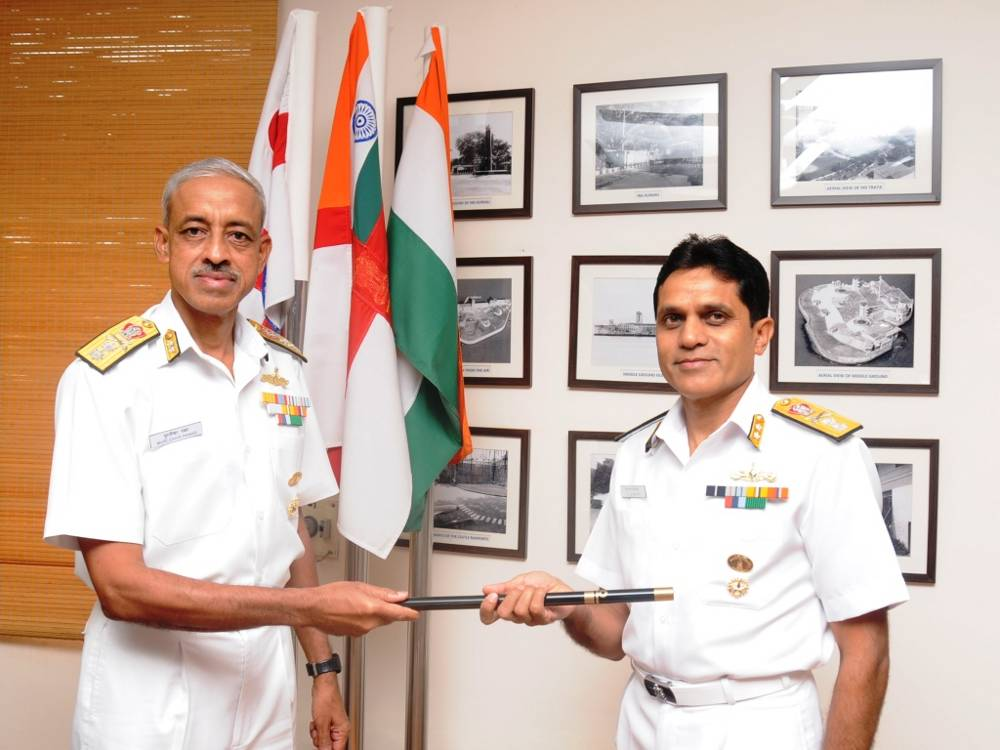
Vice Admiral Pawar (left) with VAdm S.N. Ghormade

== Education ==
He completed his primary education at Sainik School, Korukonda. Pawar did his undergraduate studies at National Defence Academy, Khadakvasla, where he was part of the 60th graduating class. At graduation, he was adjudged ‘Best all round Cadet’ during his Naval training and subsequently completed the year long Sub-Lieutenant Technical Course standing first overall. He attended the Staff Course at the Royal Naval Staff College, UK; where he was awarded the prestigious ‘Herbert Lott Prize’. He also attended College of Naval Warfare, Mumbai and the National Defence College, New Delhi.

== Career ==
Vice Admiral Pawar joined the Indian Navy on 1 July 82, specializing in Navigation and Direction. His sea commands include the missile boat INS Nashak, the corvette INS Kuthar and the guided missile frigate INS Talwar.

=== Flag rank ===
On promotion to the Flag rank, he was appointed as Flag Officer Sea Training (FOST) at Kochi, which is part of the Southern Naval Command. He then served as the Chief of Staff, Southern Naval Command. He was then appointed as the last Flag Officer Commanding Maharashtra and Gujarat Naval Area where he was responsible for the security of the two important maritime states and commanded the largest fighting formation of the Indian Navy in terms of number of units. The Maharashtra and Gujarat Naval Areas were then split into two and he was assigned as the first Flag Officer Commanding Gujarat Naval Area.

On promotion to vice admiral on 1 December 2015, he was appointed as the Director General Project Seabird – which was one of the largest defence infrastructure project in India which led to the creation of INS Kadamba. He then took over as the Chief of Staff at HQ Eastern Naval Command.

== Personal ==
An accomplished long-distance runner, the Admiral is married to Mrs Meena Pawar and they have two children.

== Honors and awards ==
Pawar was awarded the Param Vishisht Seva Medal (PVSM) in Jan 2021, Ati Vishisht Seva Medal (AVSM) in May 2016 and Vishisht Seva Medal (VSM) in January 2010.

| Ati Vishisht Seva Medal | Vishisht Seva Medal | Samanya Seva Medal | Special Service Medal |
| Operation Vijay Star | Operation Vijay Medal | Sainya Seva Medal | Videsh Seva Medal |
| 50th Anniversary of Independence Medal | 30 Years Long Service Medal | 20 Years Long Service Medal | 9 Years Long Service Medal |

Military offices
| Preceded by G. Ashok Kumar | Deputy Chief of Naval Staff; 30 January 2019 – 31 May 2021 | Succeeded by Ravneet Singh |
| New title New office | Flag Officer Commanding Gujarat Naval Area; 2015 - 2016 | Succeeded by Satishkumar Namdeo Ghormade (officiating) |
| Preceded by G. Ashok Kumar | Flag Officer Commanding Maharashtra and Gujarat Naval Area; 2014 - 2015 | Succeeded by Satishkumar Namdeo Ghormade |
| Preceded by G. Ashok Kumar | Flag Officer Sea Training; 2013 - 2014 | Succeeded by R. Hari Kumar |
