= Ajendra Bahadur Singh =

Vice Admiral Ajendra Bahadur Singh PVSM AVSM VSM

Flag Officer Commanding-in-Chief Western Naval Command
- In office 30 November 2021 – 28 February 2023
- Preceded by: R. Hari Kumar
- Succeeded by: Dinesh Kumar Tripathi

Flag Officer Commanding-in-Chief Eastern Naval Command
- In office 1 March 2021 – 30 November 2021
- Preceded by: Atul Kumar Jain
- Succeeded by: Biswajit Dasgupta

Military service
- Allegiance: India
- Branch/service: Indian Navy
- Years of service: 1 July 1983 - 28 February 2023
- Rank: Vice Admiral
- Commands: Western Naval Command; Eastern Naval Command; Eastern Fleet; INS Viraat; INS Trishul; INS Vindhyagiri; INS Veer
- Awards: Param Vishisht Seva Medal; Ati Vishisht Seva Medal; Vishisht Seva Medal

Vice Admiral Ajendra Bahadur Singh, PVSM, AVSM, VSM is a former flag officer of the Indian Navy. He last served as the flag officer commanding-in-chief (FOC-in-C), Western Naval Command from 29 November 2021 succeeding Vice Admiral R. Hari Kumar on his elevation. Previously, he served as the flag officer commanding-in-chief (FOC-in-C), Eastern Naval Command of the Indian Navy. He assumed the position on 1 March 2021 after the appointment of Vice Admiral Atul Kumar Jain as the Vice Chief of the Defence Staff. He was the Deputy Chief of Integrated Defence Staff (Doctrine Organisation Training) and served chief of staff, Western Naval Command prior to this appointment.

== Early life and education ==
Singh is an alumnus of National Defence Academy, Pune and Defence Services Staff College, Wellington. He did his schooling from Uttar Pradesh Sainik School, Lucknow. He was awarded the Scudder Medal for standing first in the course at University of Madras during his course at DSSC. He also has a master's degree in global security from Cranfield University, United Kingdom.

== Career ==
Singh was commissioned into the Indian Navy on 1 July 1983. He has commanded various ships, including INS Veer, INS Vindhyagiri, INS Trishul and INS Viraat. He is considered a specialist in navigation and aircraft direction. He has also served as the navigating officer of INS Kamorta, during Operation Pawan, and INS Ranjit. He was the fleet navigating officer of the Western Naval Fleet during Operation Parakaram.

His important staff appointments include deputy director and principal director, Directorate of Naval Plans at Naval Headquarters, where he also set up the Directorate of Strategy, Concepts and Transformation as the principal director. Other staff appointments include flag officer AOB Project, assistant chief of naval staff (policy and plans) at Naval Headquarters, and flag officer commanding, Eastern Fleet on 7 October 2014.

His instructional appointments include an instructor at National Defence Academy, Pune; an instructor at Navigation and Direction School, Kochi; and Directing Staff at Defence Services Staff College, Wellington.

He was promoted to Flag rank in 2012 and was awarded the Vishisht Seva Medal (2011) and Ati Vishisht Seva Medal (2016) for his service.

== Awards ==

| Param Vishisht Seva Medal | Ati Vishisht Seva Medal | Vishisht Seva Medal | Samanya Seva Medal |
| Special Service Medal | Operation Vijay Medal | Operation Parakram Medal | Sainya Seva Medal |
| Videsh Seva Medal | 75th Independence Anniversary Medal | 50th Anniversary of Independence Medal | 30 Years Long Service Medal |
| | 20 Years Long Service Medal | 9 Years Long Service Medal | |

== Personal life ==
Singh is married to Charu Singh and has two daughters, Ambika and Ajita.

== Gallery ==
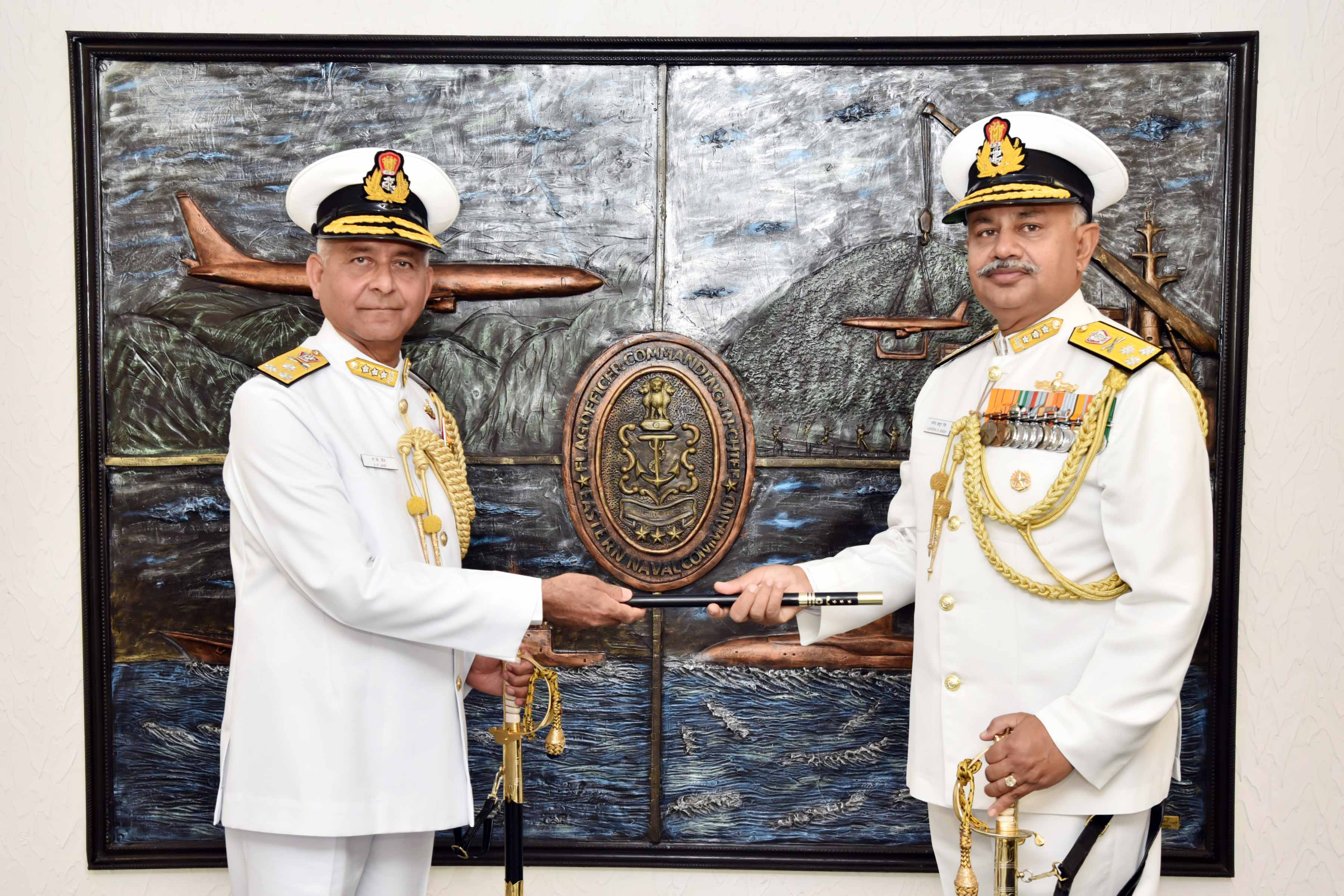
Vice Admiral Ajendra Bahadur Singh taking charge from Vice Admiral Atul Kumar Jain.

Military offices
| Preceded by R. Hari Kumar | Commanding officer INS Viraat; 5 November 2011 - 1 June 2013 | Succeeded by Biswajit Dasgupta |
| Preceded by Atul Kumar Jain | Flag officer commanding Eastern Fleet; 2014 - 2015 | Succeeded by S. V. Bhokare |
| Preceded by Ravneet Singh | Chief of staff, Western Naval Command; 2018 - 2019 | Succeeded by R. B. Pandit |
| Preceded by Atul Kumar Jain | Flag officer commanding-in-chief Eastern Naval Command; 1 March 2021 - 28 November 2021 | Succeeded by Biswajit Dasgupta |
| Preceded by R. Hari Kumar | Flag officer commanding-in-chief Western Naval Command; 30 November 2021 - 28 February 2023 | Succeeded by Dinesh K Tripathi |
