= Sundeep Singh Randhawa =

Indian Navy Admiral

Rear Admiral Sundeep Singh Randhawa VSM
- Military career
- Allegiance: India
- Branch: Indian Navy
- Service years: 1 July 1996 – present
- Rank: Rear Admiral
- Commands: INS Vikramaditya (R33); INS Chennai (D65); INS Nashak (K83); INFAC T-80
- Awards: Vishisht Seva Medal

Rear Admiral Sundeep Singh Randhawa, VSM is a serving Flag officer in the Indian Navy. He currently serves as the Flag Officer Sea Training. He earlier served as the commanding officer of the aircraft carrier INS Vikramaditya (R33).

== Naval career ==
Randhawa attended the Naval Academy, Goa and was commissioned into the Indian Navy on 1 July 1996. He qualified as a ship's diver and later specialised in Navigation and Direction. As a lieutenant, he served as the Flag Lieutenant to the Chief of the Naval Staff, and commanded the Fast attack craft (FAC) T-80.

In his early sea tenures, he served on the Pondicherry-class minesweeper INS Bhavnagar (M64) and the Kora-class corvette INS Kirch (P62). He later commanded the Veer-class corvette INS Nashak (K83), part of the 22nd Missile Vessel Squadron (Killer squadron).

In 2008, Randhawa was selected to attend the Advanced Command and Staff Course at the Joint Services Command and Staff College (JSCSC), Shrivenham in the United Kingdom. He also served onboard the aircraft carrier INS Viraat (R22) and the lead ship of her class of destroyers, INS Delhi (D61). He later served as the Staff Officer (Navigation and Direction) at HQ Flag Officer Sea Training.

As a captain, Randhawa was appointed the commissioning executive officer of the aircraft carrier INS Vikramaditya (R33). He also served as the command plans officer of the Western Naval Command, as directing staff at Naval War College, Goa and as the officer-in-charge Navigation and Direction School, Kochi. In 2016, Randhawa was selected to attend the Naval War College, Newport, Rhode Island. He later commanded the Kolkata-class guided-missile destroyer INS Chennai (D65). In 2020, when the Department of Military Affairs was created, he was among the first set of serving officers chosen to tenant director-level posts.

As a commodore, Randhawa served as the Cmde (Naval Operations) at Naval Headquarters. On 14 November 2024, he was appointed commanding officer of INS Vikramaditya (R33) and took over from Captain Vishal Bishnoi.

=== Flag rank ===
Randhawa was promoted to flag rank on 1 October 2026 and was appointed Flag Officer Sea Training (FOST) at Kochi. The FOST functions under the operational and administrative jurisdiction of Flag Officer Commanding-in-Chief Southern Naval Command. As FOST, his charter includes the conduct of the operational sea training of all ships and submarines of the Indian Navy and the Indian Coast Guard. It includes enhancing crew proficiency in all aspects, including safe navigation practices, damage control and firefighting drills, weapon firings as well as seamanship training.

== Awards and decorations ==

| Vishisht Seva Medal | Samanya Seva Medal | Operation Vijay Medal | Operation Parakram Medal |
| Sainya Seva Medal | 75th Independence Anniversary Medal | 50th Independence Anniversary Medal | 30 Years Long Service Medal |
| 20 Years Long Service Medal | | 9 Years Long Service Medal | |

== See also ==
- Flag Officer Sea Training

Military offices
| Preceded by Vishal Bishnoi | Commanding officer INS Vikramaditya; 2024 - 2026 | Succeeded by |
| Preceded by Vidhyadhar Harke | Flag Officer Sea Training; 2026 - Present | Incumbent |
