= Admiral Kumar =

Admiral Kumar may refer to:

- G. Ashok Kumar (fl. 1980s–2020s), Indian Navy vice admiral
- R. Hari Kumar (born 1962), Indian Navy admiral
- Sushil Kumar (admiral) (died 2019), Indian Navy admiral
