= Ajit Kumar P =

Indian admiral

Vice Admiral Ajit Kumar P PVSM, AVSM, VSM, ADC
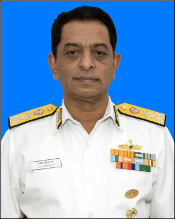
- Born: Ernakulam, Kerala, India
- Military career
- Allegiance: India
- Branch: Indian Navy
- Service years: 1 June 1981 – 28 February 2021
- Rank: Vice Admiral
- Commands: Western Naval Command; INS Mysore; INS Mumbai; INS Talwar; INS Kulish
- Awards: Param Vishisht Seva Medal; Ati Vishisht Seva Medal; Vishisht Seva Medal

Vice Admiral Ajit Kumar PVSM, AVSM, VSM, ADC is a retired Indian Navy Admiral. He served as Flag Officer Commanding-in-Chief (FOC-in-C) Western Naval Command. He assumed the position on 31 January 2019 after Vice Admiral Girish Luthra's retirement and superannuated on 28 February 2021. Prior to this appointment, he served as Vice Chief of Naval Staff.

== Early life and education ==
He is an alumnus of Sainik School Kazhakootam, Kerala and National Defence Academy, Pune. He has also attended the Naval Higher Command Course and the Naval War College, Newport.

== Career ==
He was commissioned in the navy on 1 July 1981. He is a missile and gunnery specialist. He has commanded six ships, including INS Kulish; INS Talwar; INS Mumbai and INS Mysore. He was deputed to the Mauritian Coast Guard on his first assignment where, over two and a half years, he commanded two patrol vessels. His staff assignments include director Maritime Warfare Centre, Visakhapatnam; commanding officer of INS Dronacharya; chief staff officer (operations) of the Western Naval Command.

In September 2009, he was promoted to flag rank as a rear admiral. Subsequently, his assignments included assistant chief of personnel (human resources development) at IHQ of MoD; Flag Officer Commanding Eastern Fleet (FOCEF) and chief of staff of Southern Naval Command. He was promoted to the rank of vice admiral on 1 December 2013. As a vice admiral, he has served as the commandant of Indian Naval Academy (December 2013 to February 2016). During his tenure as the commandant, there was expansion of the academy, and different naval schools across the country were shifted to the main campus at Ezhimala. He has also served as the deputy chief of integrated defence staff (operations) and as deputy chief of integrated defence staff (policy planning & force development) at the HQ of MoD.

He was appointed as vice chief of naval staff on 30 October 2017, succeeding Vice Admiral Karambir Singh.

During his career, he has been awarded Param Vishisht Seva Medal, Ati Vishisht Seva Medal, Vishisht Seva Medal for his service.

== Awards and decorations ==

Param Vishisht Seva Medal	Ati Vishisht Seva Medal	Vishisht Seva Medal	Samanya Seva Medal
Operation Vijay Medal	Operation Parakram Medal	Sainya Seva Medal	Videsh Seva Medal
50th Anniversary of Independence Medal	30 Years Long Service Medal	20 Years Long Service Medal	9 Years Long Service Medal

== Personal life ==
He and his wife Sunita Kumar have a daughter. He is interested in reading and yoga.

Military offices
Preceded by Girish Luthra	Flag Officer Commanding-in-Chief, Western Naval Command; 31 January 2019 – 28 February 2021	Succeeded by R. Hari Kumar
Preceded by Karambir Singh	Vice Chief of Naval Staff; 30 October 2017 – 30 January 2019	Succeeded by G. Ashok Kumar
Preceded by Pradeep Chauhan	Commandant, Indian Naval Academy; December 2013 - October 2016	Succeeded by S. V. Bhokare
Preceded by Harish Bisht	Flag Officer Commanding Eastern Fleet; 2012-2013	Succeeded by Atul Kumar Jain
