= Harish Bisht =

Vice admiral of the Indian Navy

Vice Admiral Harish Chandra Singh Bisht PVSM, AVSM, ADC
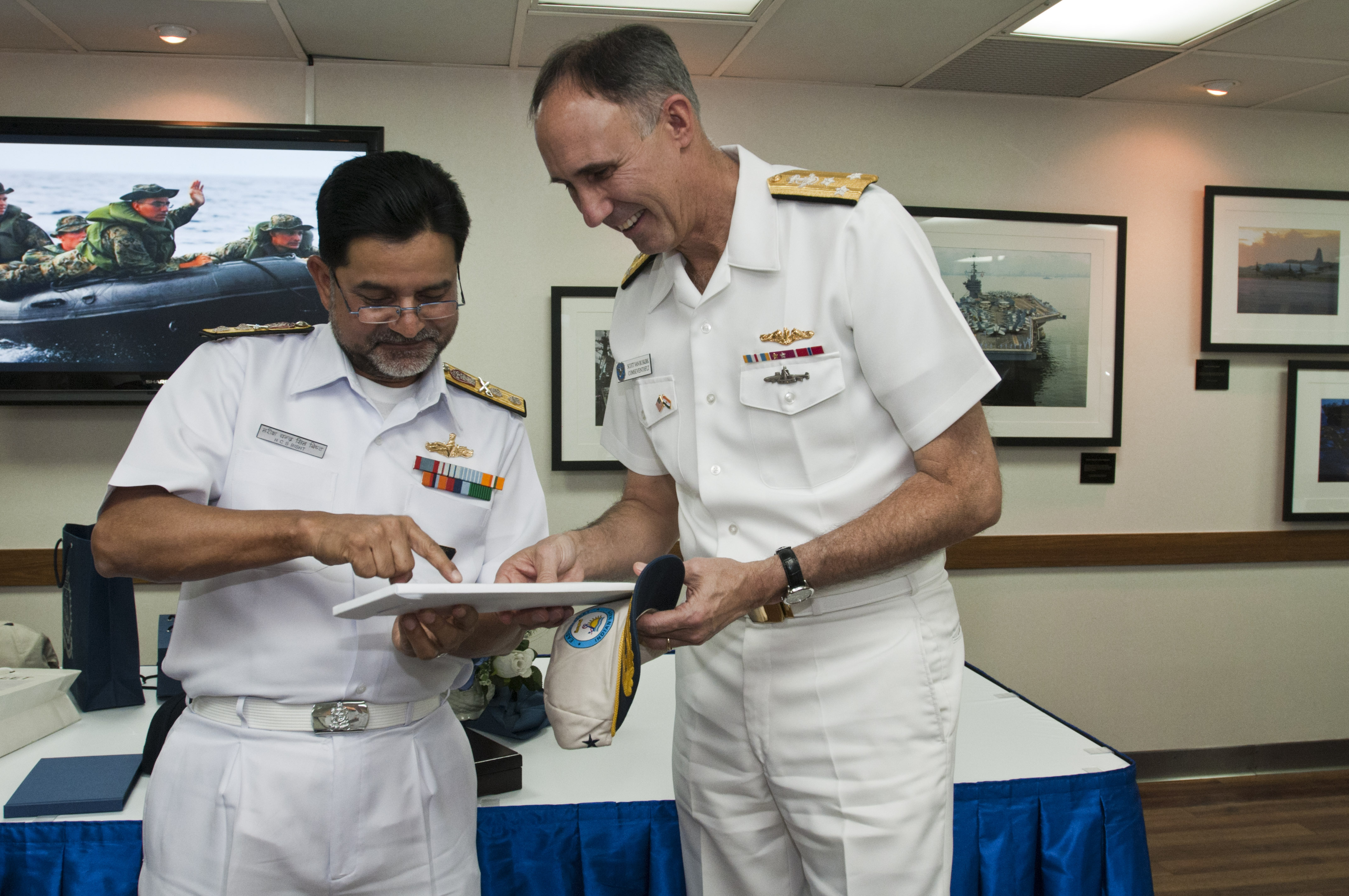
- Vice Admiral Bisht (left) presenting a souvenir to Vice Admiral Scott R. Van Buskirk of the United States Navy
- Born: November 1, 1957; Kausani, Uttarakhand
- Died: 3 June 2026 (aged 68)
- Military career
- Allegiance: India
- Branch: Indian Navy; Indian Coast Guard
- Service years: 1 July 1979 – 31 October 2017
- Rank: Vice Admiral
- Commands: Eastern Naval Command; Indian Coast Guard; Eastern Fleet; INS Kora; INS Tabar
- Awards: Param Vishisht Seva Medal; Ati Vishisht Seva Medal

Vice Admiral Harish Chandra Singh Bisht, PVSM, AVSM, ADC (1957 - 2026) was a former Flag Officer of the Indian Navy. He is an alumnus of the Sainik School Ghorakhal, Nainital; National Defence Academy Khadakvasla, Pune and the Naval Academy, Kochi and served as Flag Officer Commanding-in-Chief, Eastern Naval Command until his retirement on 31 October 2017.

== Career ==
Vice Admiral Bisht was commissioned in the Executive Branch of the Indian Navy as a Surface Warfare Officer on 1 July 1979.

He was promoted to Flag rank on 28 January 2008 and took over the appointment of Assistant Controller of Carrier Projects at IHQ, MoD (N). His further Flag rank appointments include Chief of Staff, Southern Naval Command and Flag Officer Sea Training at Kochi, Flag Officer Commanding Eastern Fleet, at Visakhapatnam and Assistant Chief of Personnel (HRD) at IHQ, MoD (N).

He was promoted to the rank of Vice Admiral on 1 September 2012 and took over the appointment of the Controller of Personnel Services (CPS) at IHQ, MoD (N). On 1 February 2015, he was appointed the Director General of Indian Coast Guard (DGICG). On 27 February 2016, he was appointed the Flag Officer Commanding-in-Chief, Eastern Naval Command.

He was awarded PVSM for his service in 2017.

Vice Admiral Bisht retired from service on 31 October 2017.

== Awards and decorations ==

Param Vishisht Seva Medal	Ati Vishisht Seva Medal	Special Service Medal	
Operation Vijay Medal	Videsh Seva Medal	50th Anniversary of Independence Medal	
30 Years Long Service Medal	20 Years Long Service Medal		9 Years Long Service Medal

Military offices
Preceded by Satish Soni	Flag Officer Commanding-in-Chief, Eastern Naval Command; 2016 - 31 October 2017	Succeeded by Karambir Singh
Preceded by Anurag Thapliyal	Director General of the Indian Coast Guard; 2015 - 2016	Succeeded by Rajendra Singh Bisht
Preceded by Parasurama Naidu Murugesan	Flag Officer Commanding Eastern Fleet; 2011-2012	Succeeded by Ajit Kumar P
Preceded by Sunil Lanba	Flag Officer Sea Training; 2009 - 2011	Succeeded by G. Ashok Kumar
