= Bimal Verma =

Vice Admiral Bimal Kumar Verma AVSM, ADC
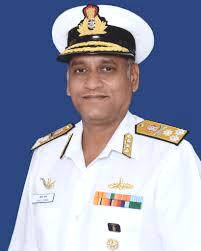
- Spouse: Seema Verma
- Relatives: Nirmal Kumar Verma (brother)
- Military career
- Allegiance: India
- Branch: Indian Navy
- Service years: 1980 - 1 December 2019
- Rank: Vice Admiral
- Commands: Andaman and Nicobar Command; INS Mysore; INS Ranjit; INS Magar; INS Shardul
- Awards: Ati Vishisht Seva Medal

Vice Admiral Bimal Verma, AVSM, ADC is a retired Flag Officer in the Indian Navy. He served as the 13th Commander-in-Chief, Andaman and Nicobar Command from 29 February 2016 to 1 December 2019.

== Early life and education ==
Verma attended the Rashtriya Indian Military College (RIMC), Dehradun. He later attended the National Defence Academy where he was adjudged the Best Naval Cadet. His elder brother, Nirmal Kumar Verma also joined the Navy and rose to become the 20th Chief of the Naval Staff.

== Career ==
Verma was commissioned into the Navy on 1 January 1980. He has done his specialisation in Communication and Electronic Warfare.

He has commanded the amphibious warfare ships INS Shardul and INS Magar, the destroyer INS Ranjit and the Guided missile destroyer INS Mysore.

Ashore, he has served as Principal Director Naval Operations and as the Naval attaché at the Embassy of India, Tehran, Iran.

As a flag officer, he served as Flag Officer Commanding Maharashtra and Gujarat Naval Area as well as Assistant Chief of Naval Staff for Information Warfare & Operations. After his promotion to the rank of vice admiral on 1 November 2012, he was appointed as the Chief of Staff, Eastern Naval Command where he coordinated the International Fleet Review 2016.

== Awards and decorations ==

Ati Vishisht Seva Medal	Operation Parakram Medal	Sainya Seva Medal	Videsh Seva Medal
50th Anniversary of Independence Medal	30 Years Long Service Medal	20 Years Long Service Medal	9 Years Long Service Medal

Military offices
Preceded by Sunil Lanba	Flag Officer Commanding Maharashtra & Gujarat Naval Area; 2011 – 2012	Succeeded by Karambir Singh
Preceded by PK Chatterjee	Commander-in-Chief, Andaman and Nicobar Command; 29 February 2016 – 1 December 2019	Succeeded by Lt Gen P S Rajeshwar
