= Sunil Lanba =

Former chief of the Indian Navy (born 1957)

Admiral Sunil Lanba PVSM, AVSM, PJG, ADC
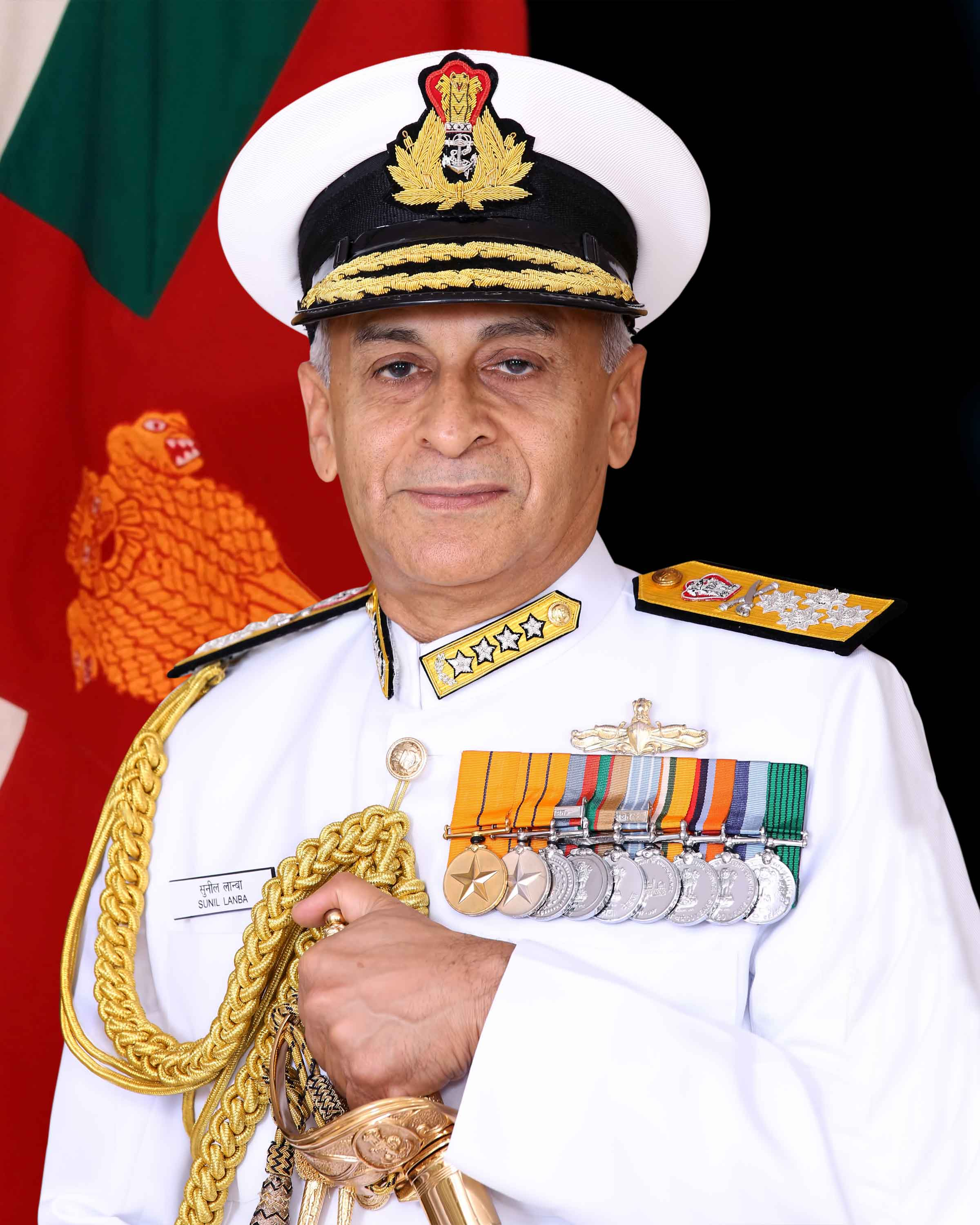
- Official portrait

55th Chairman of the Chiefs of Staff Committee
- In office 31 December 2016 – 31 May 2019
- President: Pranab Mukherjee; Ram Nath Kovind
- Prime Minister: Narendra Modi
- Preceded by: Arup Raha
- Succeeded by: Birender Singh Dhanoa

23rd Chief of the Naval Staff
- In office 31 May 2016 – 31 May 2019
- President: Pranab Mukherjee; Ram Nath Kovind
- Prime Minister: Narendra Modi
- Preceded by: Robin K. Dhowan
- Succeeded by: Karambir Singh

Personal details
- Born: 17 July 1957 (age 69) Amarpur, Palwal, Haryana, India
- Spouse: Reena Lanba
- Relations: 2 daughters and 1 son
- Awards: Param Vishisht Seva Medal; Ati Vishist Seva Medal

Military service
- Allegiance: India
- Branch/service: Indian Navy
- Years of service: 1 January 1978 – 31 May 2019
- Rank: Admiral
- Commands: Chairman, Chiefs of Staff Committee; Chief of Naval Staff; Vice Chief of Naval Staff; Western Naval Command; Southern Naval Command; INS Mumbai; INS Ranvijay; INS Himgiri; INS Kakinada

Admiral Sunil Lanba, PVSM, AVSM, PJG, ADC (born 17 July 1957) is a retired Indian naval officer who served as the 23rd Chief of the Naval Staff of the Indian Navy. He assumed the office on 31 May 2016 after Admiral Robin K. Dhowan and demitted office three years later on 31 May 2019. During this time, he also served as Chairman of the Chiefs of Staff Committee and Honorary Aide-de-Camp to the President of India.

== Early life and education ==
Sunil Lanba was born on 17 July 1957 and hails from Palwal district, Haryana. He attended Mayo College, Ajmer; National Defence Academy, Pune; Defence Services Staff College, Wellington; College of Defence Management, Secunderabad and Royal College of Defence Studies, London, and is a post-graduate in Defence and Management studies.

== Military career ==
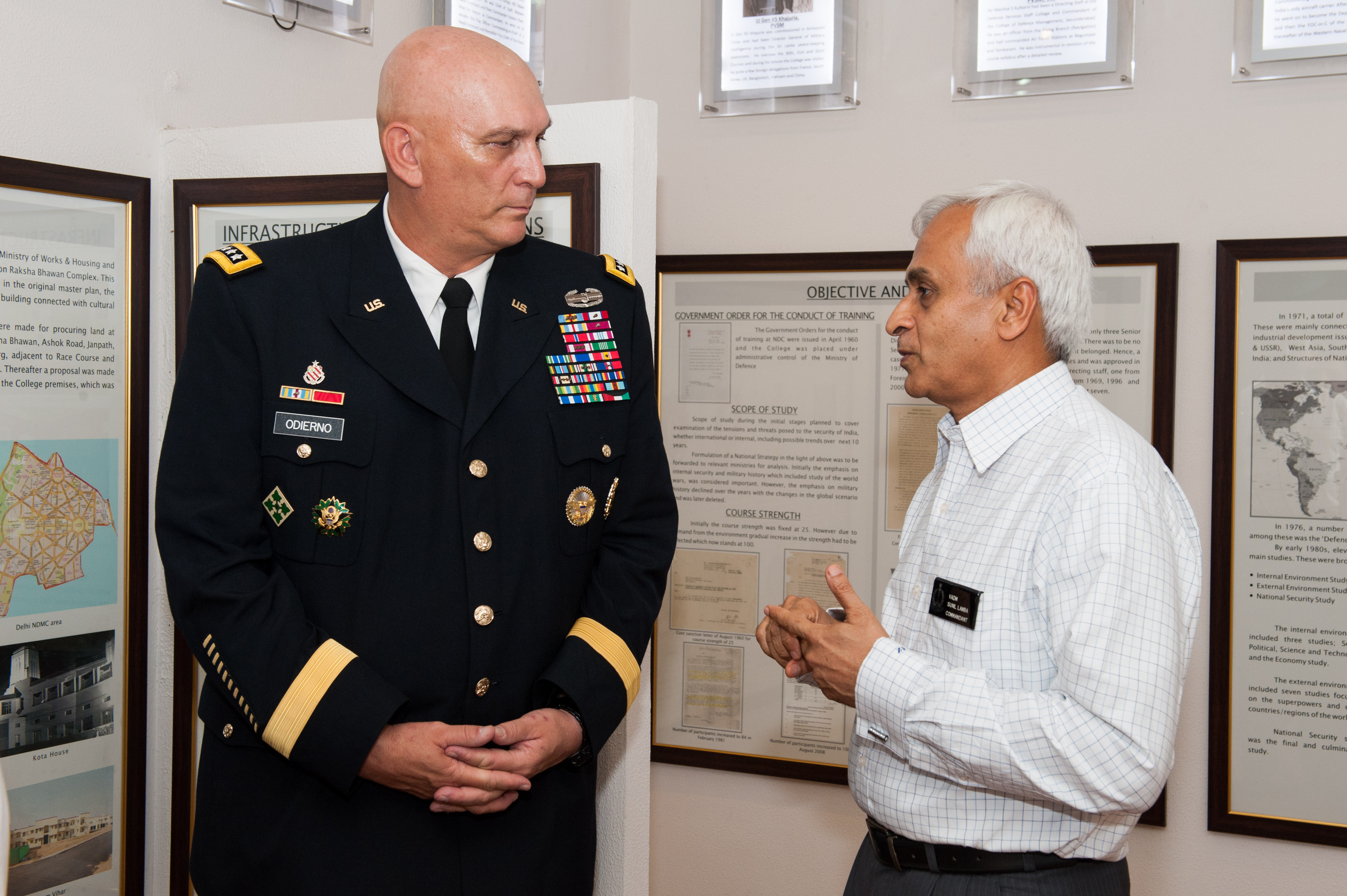
National Defence College Commandant Vice Admiral Sunil Lanba gives U.S. Army Chief of Staff Gen. Raymond T. Odierno a tour of the college's archive display

Lanba was commissioned into the Indian Navy as an officer on 1 January 1978 into the Executive Branch of Indian Navy. He is a Navigation and Direction specialist who has served as the navigation and operations officer onboard various ships in both the Eastern and Western Fleets. He, over four decades, has served as a navigation officer on board INS Sindhudurg and INS Dunagiri before serving as the commanding officer (CO) of various ships: minesweeper INS Kakinada, frigate INS Himgiri, INS Ranvijay and INS Mumbai. Promoted to substantive captain on 1 January 2000, he also served as executive officer of aircraft carrier INS Viraat and the Fleet Operations Officer of the Western Fleet.

He has also held numerous training positions like training officer at the National Defence Academy; Directing Staff at the College of Defence Management; Commandant of the National Defence College and Flag Officer Sea Training organisation at the Local Workup Team (West), Western Naval Command.

=== Flag rank ===
Lanba on being elevated to flag rank, was the Flag Officer Commanding Maharashtra and Gujarat Naval Area (FOMAG) and Chief of Staff, Southern Naval Command. On being promoted to vice admiral, he was the Chief of Staff, Eastern Naval Command; Flag Officer Commanding-in-Chief of the Southern and Western Naval Commands; Fleet Oper and the Vice Chief of Naval Staff from 2 June 2014 to 30 March 2015.

On 5 May 2016, the Union Government announced that Lanba will take charge as the Chief of the Naval Staff on 31 May 2016, replacing Admiral Robin K. Dhowan who retired the same day.

He took over as the chairman of the chiefs of staff committee (CoSC) from outgoing IAF chief Marshal Arup Raha on 29 December 2016.

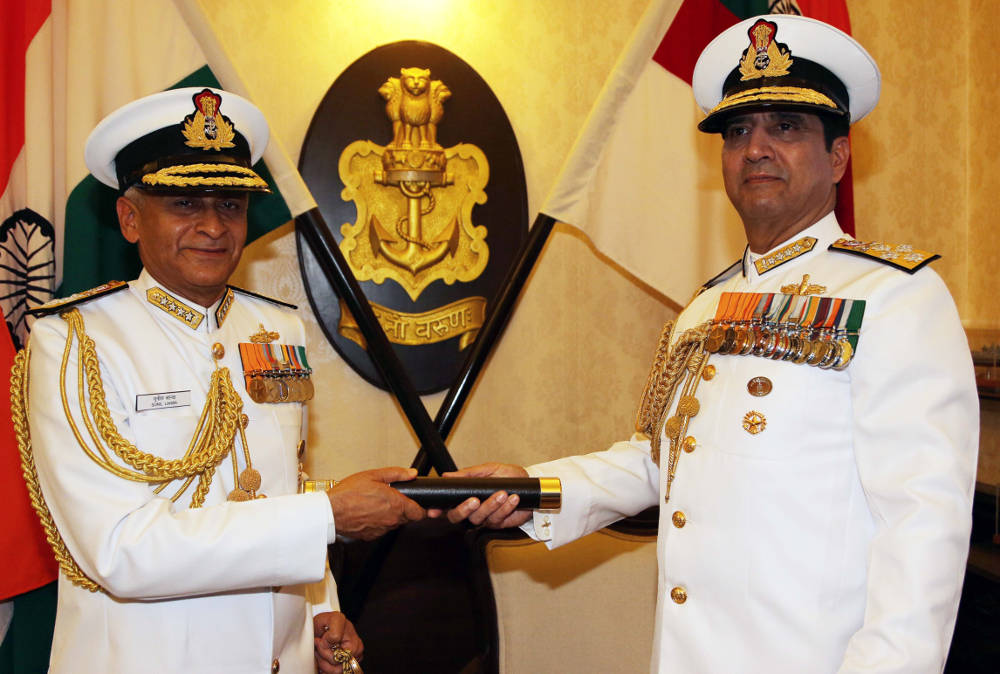
Admiral R. K. Dhowan, the outgoing CNS, handovers the traditional telescope of the CNS to Admiral Lanba as he takes charge as the chief at Naval Headquarters, New Delhi, on 31 May 2016.

=== Bilateral visits as CNS ===
Country	Date	Purpose	References
2016
Myanmar	1–4 November	Bilateral discussions with First Vice President, Vice Senior General and Service Chiefs of Army and Navy; Visit National Defence College, Defence Services Academy and Naval Training Command	
Sri Lanka	27 November – 1 December	Bilateral meetings with President, Prime Minister and 3 Service Chiefs; Key note speaker at Galle Dialogue	
Japan	19–23 December	Bilateral meetings with Chief of Staff(JMSDF), MoS for Defence, Joint Staff	
2017
UAE	26–28 February	Bilateral meetings with MoS for Defence, Chief of Staff, Commander of Naval force; Visit to Ghantoot Naval Base, National Defence College (UAE) and Rashid Bin Saeed Al Maktoum Naval College	
Oman	1–2 March	Bilateral meetings with MoS for Defence, Service Chiefs; Visit to Sultan Qaboos Naval Academy and Said Bin Naval Base	
Malaysia	11–15 April	Bilateral meetings with Deputy Minister of Defence, Chief of Royal Malaysian Defence Forces and the 3 service Chiefs; Visit to submarine base and Royal Malaysian Armed Forces Command and Staff College	
Singapore	15 May – 19 May	Bilateral meetings with Defence Minister, Chief of Defence Forces, Chief of Navy; Attend International Maritime Review (IMR) and International Maritime Defence Exhibition and Conference (IMDEX) 2017	
Israel	12–15 June	Bilateral meetings with Defence Minister, Chief of General Staff, Commander-in-Chief of Israeli Navy, Commander of Israeli Air Force and Commander of Israeli Ground Forces; Visit to Haifa Naval Base and other military establishments	
Mozambique	23–25 July	Bilateral meetings with Minister of National Defence, Chief of Defence Staff, and the three service Chiefs; Visit to Instituto Superior De Estudos De Defesa (ISEDEF) and Hero's Square	
Tanzania	26–30 July	Bilateral meetings with President of Tanzania, Minister of Defence and National Service, Minister of Foreign Affairs, Chief of Defence Forces and the three service Chiefs; Visit to the Command and Staff College	
Vietnam	4–7 October	Bilateral meetings with Prime Minister of Vietnam, Defence Minister, Vice Minister of National Defence, Chief of General Staff and Commander-in-Chief of the Vietnam People's Navy; Visit to the National Defence Academy, Vietnam Naval Academy, Naval Region 4 and Ho Chi Minh Mausoleum	
France	5–10 November	Bilateral meetings with Defence Minister of France, Chief of Defence Staff, Chief of French Navy, Director General Armament and Director General International Relations & Strategy; Visit to the Landivisia airbase, Submarine Facility at Cherbourg, Maritime Prefectures at Brest and Cherbourg	
Bangladesh	26–28 November	Bilateral meetings with Chief of the Naval Staff; Attend the International Multilateral Maritime Search and Rescue Exercise (IMMSAREX)	
2018
Saudi Arabia	4–8 February	Bilateral meetings with Deputy Defence Minister, Chief of General Staff, Commanders of Royal Saudi Naval Forces, Royal Saudi Arabian Land Forces, Air Forces and Air Defence Forces; Visit to the Naval Operations Centre, Naval Fire and Rescue School and Western Fleet at Jeddah	
United States	19–23 March	Bilateral meetings with Secretary of Defence, Secretary of the Navy, Vice Chairman Joint Chiefs of Staff, Chief of Naval Operations, Commander of Pacific command, Commander of Pacific fleet, Commander of Naval Sea Systems Command; Visit to the Pacific Command Headquarters at Pearl Harbor, Naval Surface Warfare Centre at Dahlgreen and the Pentagon.	
Iran	23–25 April	Indian Ocean Naval Symposium (IONS) and Conclave of Chiefs	
Bangladesh	24–29 June	Bilateral meetings with President, Prime Minister and Chiefs of Armed Forces; Visit to naval bases at Chittagong and Khulna; Inaugurate the India–Bangladesh CORPAT, 1st edition	
United States	18-22 September	Visit 23rd edition of the International Seapower Symposium (ISS); Bilateral meetings with Chief of the Naval Staff; Chief of Naval Operations (CNO); Commanders of Indo-Pacific Command, Pacific Fleet and Naval Forces-Europe, NAVCENT, and 5th Fleet; Bilateral meetings with Chiefs of Navies of France, Sweden, United Kingdom, Japan, Australia and Malaysia.	
Russia	26-29 November	Bilateral meetings with Commander-in-Chief of Russian Navy, Chief of General Staff, First Deputy Defence Minister, Director, Federal Service for Military Technical Cooperation (FSMTC).; Visit to Military Academy of the General Staff, Piskarev Memorial Cemetery, Nakhimov Naval School and Admiralty Shipyard at St Petersburg and Moscow.	

== Awards and decorations ==
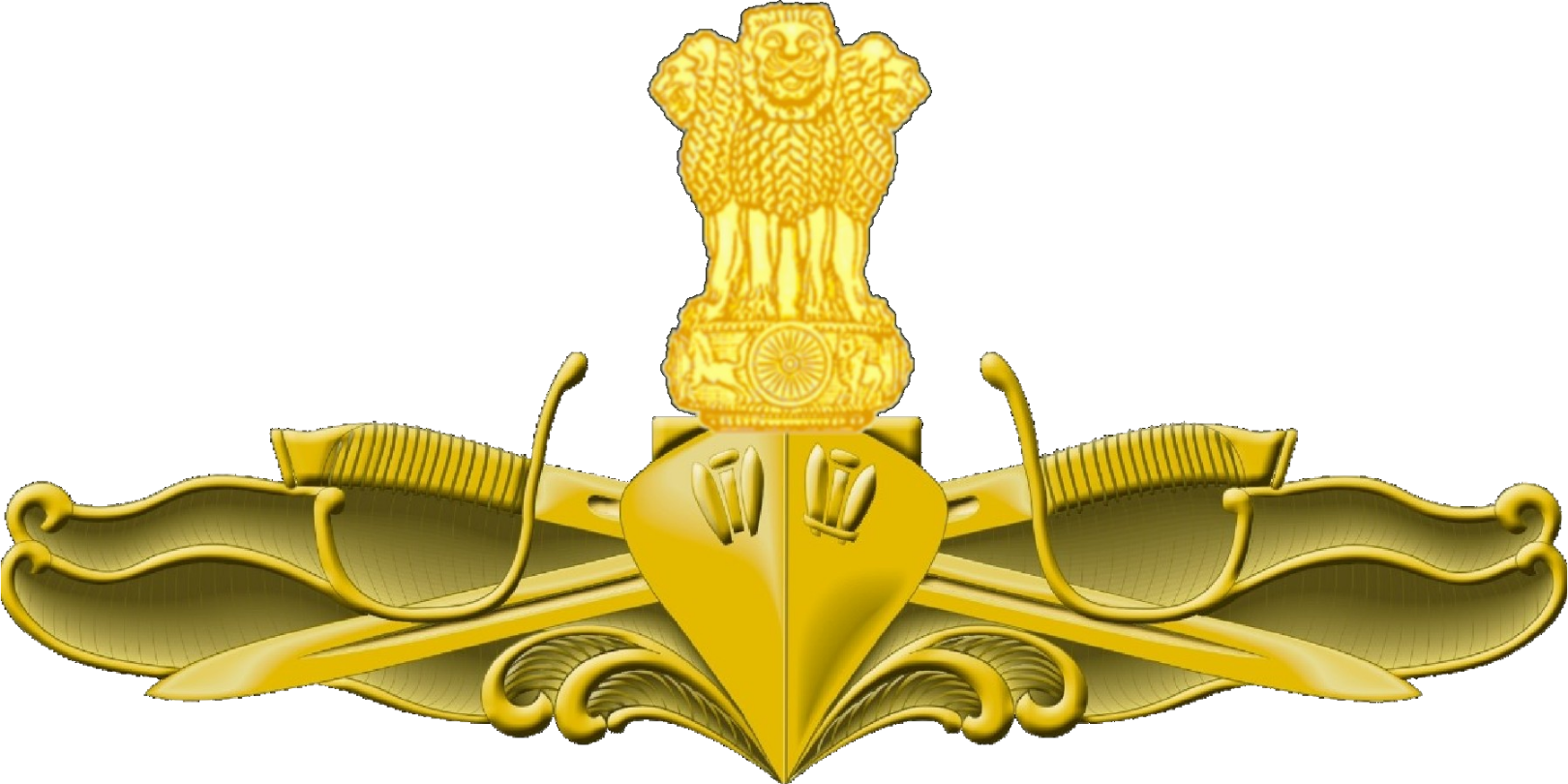

Surface warfare badge
Param Vishisht Seva Medal	Ati Vishisht Seva Medal	Special Service Medal	Operation Parakram Medal
Videsh Seva Medal	50th Anniversary of Independence Medal	30 Years Long Service Medal	20 Years Long Service Medal
9 Years Long Service Medal		Meritorious Service Medal - Military (Singapore)	

He was awarded the Meritorious Service Medal (Military) of Singapore on 8 September 2022. He was awarded for his outstanding contributions in enhancing the strong and long-standing bilateral defence relationship between the Indian Navy and the Republic of Singapore Navy. Admiral Lanba became the first Indian to receive this award.

== Personal life ==
He is married to Reena Lanba who is a qualified teacher and a home-maker. They have two daughters, named Moneesha and Sukriti, and a son named Adhiraj.

Military offices
Preceded by Rama Kant Pattanaik	Flag Officer Sea Training; 2008 - 2009	Succeeded by Harish Bisht
Preceded by PK Chatterjee	Flag Officer Commanding Maharashtra & Gujarat Naval Area; 2009 – 2011	Succeeded by Bimal Verma
Preceded by Air Marshal P. K. Roy	Commandant of the National Defence College; 2012 - 2014	Succeeded by Lieutenant General N. S. Ghei
Preceded by Surinder Pal Singh Cheema	Flag Officer Commanding-in-Chief Southern Naval Command; 2015 – 2016	Succeeded by Girish Luthra
Preceded by Surinder Pal Singh Cheema	Flag Officer Commanding-in-Chief Western Naval Command; 2016 – 2016	Succeeded by Girish Luthra
Preceded by Robin K. Dhowan	Chief of Naval Staff; 2016 – 2019	Succeeded by Karambir Singh
Preceded by Arup Raha	Chairman of the Chiefs of Staff Committee; 31 December 2016 – 31 May 2019	Succeeded by Birender Singh Dhanoa
