= Atul Kumar Jain =

Retired Indian naval officer

Vice Admiral Atul Kumar Jain PVSM, AVSM, VSM
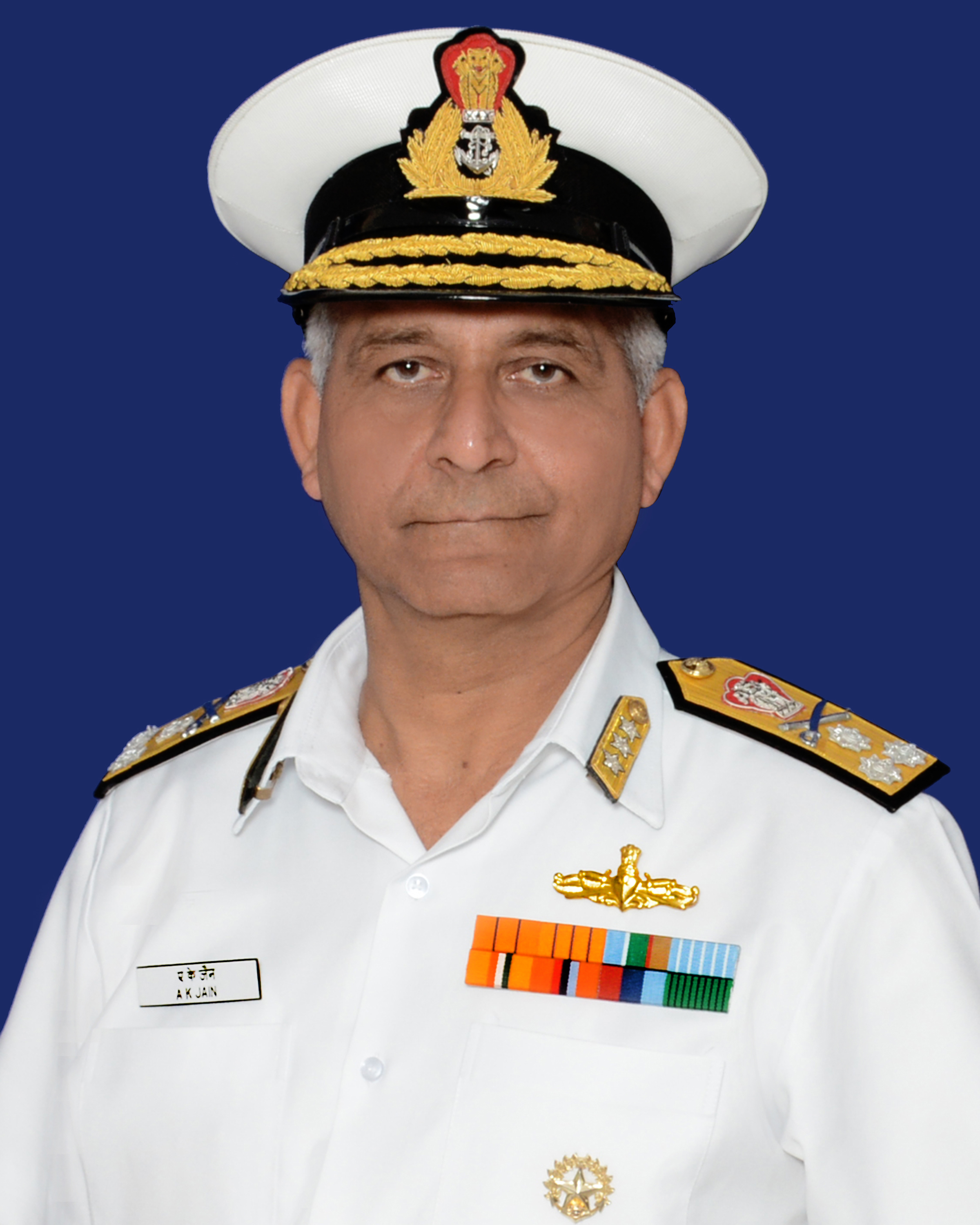
- Vice Admiral Atul Kumar Jain
- Military career
- Allegiance: India
- Branch: Indian Navy
- Service years: July 1982 - September 2021
- Rank: Vice Admiral
- Commands: Eastern Naval Command; INS Nirghat (K89); INS Khukri (P49); INS Rajput (D51); INS Mysore (D60)
- Awards: Param Vishisht Seva Medal; Ati Vishisht Seva Medal; Vishisht Seva Medal

Vice Admiral Atul Kumar Jain PVSM, AVSM, VSM is a retired Indian naval officer who served as the 2nd Vice Chief of Defence Staff of India. He assumed the position on 28 February 2021. Previously, he served as Flag Officer Commanding-in-Chief Eastern Naval Command of the Indian Navy.

== Career ==
He was commissioned in the Indian Navy in July 1982. He is an alumnus of Sainik School Rewa; National Defence Academy (Pune); the Defence Services Staff College; the College of Naval Warfare (Mumbai) and the National Defence College (Pretoria, South Africa). He is a graduate from Jawaharlal Nehru University and has received his master's degree in Defence and Strategic Studies from Madras University.

== Awards and decorations ==

Param Vishisht Seva Medal	Ati Vishisht Seva Medal	Vishisht Seva Medal	Operation Parakram Medal
Videsh Seva Medal	50th Anniversary of Independence Medal		20 Years Long Service Medal
20 Years Long Service Medal		9 Years Long Service Medal	

Military offices
Preceded by R. Hari Kumar	Vice Chief of Defence Staff; 28 February 2021 - 30 September 2021	Succeeded by Balabhadra Radha Krishna
Preceded by Karambir Singh	Flag Officer Commanding-in-Chief Eastern Naval Command; 1 June 2019 - 28 February 2021	Succeeded by Ajendra Bahadur Singh
Preceded by Ajit Kumar P	Flag Officer Commanding Eastern Fleet; 2013-2014	Succeeded by Ajendra Bahadur Singh
New title First holder	Flag Officer Commanding Karnataka Naval Area; 2011-2013	Succeeded by C. S. Murthy
