= Nashak =

Nashak may refer to:

- INS Nashak, two different ships in the Indian Navy
- James Nashak (born 1946), Canadian Anglican priest
