= Flag Officer Sea Training (India) =

Indian Navy training organisation

- Crest of Flag Officer Sea Training
- Founded: 21 December 1992
- Country: India
- Branch: Indian Navy
- Type: Training organisation
- Part of: Southern Naval Command
- Headquarters: Kochi
- Mottos: प्रशिक्षण परिश्रम श्रेष्ठता (Sanskrit) 'Excellence through in-depth training and tireless practice'

Commanders
- FOST: Rear Admiral Sundeep Singh Randhawa VSM

The Flag Officer Sea Training (FOST) is a training organisation in the Indian Navy. FOST is the authority responsible for the operational sea training of all personnel of Indian Naval and Coast Guard ships and submarines. The organisation was instituted in 1992 and is the common authority to maintain battle efficiency standards. It also provides training to navies and maritime security forces of friendly foreign countries (FFC). Headquartered in Kochi, the FOST operates under the control of the Flag Officer Commanding-in-Chief Southern Naval Command.

== History ==
In October 1977, an organisation called the Weapons workup organisation (WWO) was set up. This was aimed at increasing the efficiency of ships' weapons. In 1981, it was re-designated Warship Workup Organisation in Bombay. An additional WWO was set up in Vizag - WWO (V) - for the Eastern Fleet. In March 1992, a local flotilla workup team (LWT) was set up for the ships operating under the Maharashtra Naval Area. These three organisations - WWO (B), WWO (V) and LWT - reported into the Flag Officer Commanding Western Fleet (FOCWF), Flag Officer Commanding Eastern Fleet (FOCEF) and Flag Officer Commanding Maharashtra Naval Area (FOMA) respectively.

In 1992, a single authority was created to consolidate work-up efforts and serve as the safety authority responsible for the operational sea training (OST) of all ships. The organisation would be headed by a rear admiral of the executive branch and be based out of Kochi. As the Southern Naval Command (SNC) was the training command of the Navy, the FOST would report into the FOC-in-C SNC. An Indian Navy Workup Team (INWT) was created at Kochi and local workup units were created at Bombay and Vizag - LWT (West) and LWT (East).

On 4 June 1993, the first ship was trained by FOST - the Khukri-class corvette INS Khanjar (P47). In 2000, the Sukanya-class patrol vessel INS Sarayu (P54) was sold to the Sri Lanka Navy. She was commissioned as SLNS Sayura in November 2000. The Sayura was the first foreign ship whose operational sea training was conducted by INWT and FOST.

== Structure ==
The INWT at Kochi works up all major warships - Aircraft Carriers, Anti-submarine warfare and Guided-missile destroyers, frigates and other fleet units. The INWT is under the operational control of FOST and administrative control of FOC-in-C SNC. The LWT (West) and LWT (East) work up Seaward-class defense boats, missile boats, Anti Submarine Patrol Vessels, Ocean-going tugs, etc. They are under the operational control of FOST and administrative control of FOC-in-C of Western Naval Command and Eastern Naval Command respectively.

== Training regime ==
The FOST conducts multiple types of training which encompasses all spheres of ship activity. There are short training programs like the Sea Safety Checks (SSC) and Operational Sea Checks (OSC) for a duration of 7 – 10 days on selected disciplines like Bridge Work, Damage Control and Fire Fighting, Machinery Breakdown Drills and Ship Safety.

It also conducts full work-up programs, under the ambit of OST, from three weeks (for minor war vessels) to six weeks (for aircraft carriers). It ensures a thorough training of the ship to achieve the prescribed performance standards. On completion, it conducts an operational readiness assessment at sea and certifies the ships operational status and the areas of improvement. The OST covers all operational/combat functions - aviation, ship management, hull, seamanship, NBCD, engineering, electrical, logistics and medical.

== List of FOST ==
S.No.	Name	Assumed office	Left office	Notes
1	Rear Admiral Gupteshwar Rai AVSM, NM, VSM	December 1992	December 1993	First FOST. Later Flag Officer Commanding Maharashtra Naval Area.
2	Rear Admiral O. P. Bansal AVSM, VSM	December 1993	October 1995	Later Director General of the Indian Coast Guard.
3	Rear Admiral K. V. Bharathan VSM	October 1995	May 1997	Later Flag Officer Commanding Eastern Fleet.
4	Rear Admiral Ajit Tewari NM	May 1997	November 1998	
5	Rear Admiral S. S. Byce NM	November 1998	May 2000	Later Flag Officer Commanding-in-Chief Western Naval Command.
6	Rear Admiral Rakesh Chopra VSM	May 2000	January 2002	
7	Rear Admiral Rakesh Kala NM	January 2002	November 2003	
8	Rear Admiral I. K. Saluja AVSM, VSM	November 2003	May 2005	
9	Rear Admiral V. S. Chaudhari NM	May 2005	July 2006	
10	Rear Admiral M. P. Muralidharan NM	July 2006	May 2007	Later Director General of the Indian Coast Guard.
11	Rear Admiral Rama Kant Pattanaik YSM	May 2007	November 2008	Later Deputy Chief of the Naval Staff.
12	Rear Admiral Sunil Lanba	November 2008	October 2009	Later Chief of the Naval Staff.
13	Rear Admiral Harish Bisht	October 2009	January 2011	Later Flag Officer Commanding-in-Chief Eastern Naval Command.
14	Rear Admiral G. Ashok Kumar VSM	July 2011	August 2012	Later Vice Chief of the Naval Staff.
15	Rear Admiral Murlidhar Sadashiv Pawar VSM	September 2012	December 2013	Later Deputy Chief of the Naval Staff.
16	Rear Admiral R. Hari Kumar VSM	December 2013	November 2014	Later Chief of the Naval Staff.
17	Rear Admiral G. Ashok Kumar VSM	November 2014	March 2015	Later Vice Chief of the Naval Staff.
18	Rear Admiral S. K. Grewal VSM	March 2015	October 2016	
19	Rear Admiral M. A. Hampiholi NM	October 2016	February 2018	Later Flag Officer Commanding-in-Chief Southern Naval Command.
20	Rear Admiral Sanjay Jasjit Singh NM	February 2018	March 2019	Later Flag Officer Commanding-in-Chief Western Naval Command.
21	Rear Admiral Krishna Swaminathan VSM	March 2019	February 2020	Current Chief of the Naval Staff.
22	Rear Admiral Rajesh Pendharkar AVSM, VSM	February 2020	May 2021	Later Flag Officer Commanding-in-Chief Eastern Naval Command.
23	Rear Admiral Rajesh Dhankhar NM	June 2021	April 2022	Current Deputy Chief of the Integrated Defence Staff (Doctrine, Organisation & Training).
24	Rear Admiral Rahul Vilas Gokhale NM	May 2022	May 2023	Current Chief of Staff, Western Naval Command.
25	Rear Admiral Susheel Menon VSM	May 2023	Sept 1, 2024	Current Chief of Staff, Eastern Naval Command.
26	Rear Admiral Srinivas Maddula	Sept 1, 2024	21 November 2025	Current Flag Officer Commanding Western Fleet.
27	Rear Admiral Vidhyadhar Harke VSM	22 November 2025	31 July 2026	Current Flag Officer Commanding Maharashtra Naval Area.
28	Rear Admiral Sundeep Singh Randhawa VSM	1 October 2026	Incumbent	Current FOST

== See also ==
- Southern Naval Command

== Bibliography ==
- Singh, Anup (2018), Blue Waters Ahoy!, The Indian Navy 2001-2010, HarperCollins Publishers India, ISBN 9789353025526
- Hiranandani, G.M. (2010), Transition to Guardianship: The Indian Navy 1991-2000, Lancer Publishers, ISBN 9781935501268
