= G. Ashok Kumar =

Vice Chief of the India Naval Staff

Vice Admiral G. Ashok Kumar PVSM, AVSM, VSM
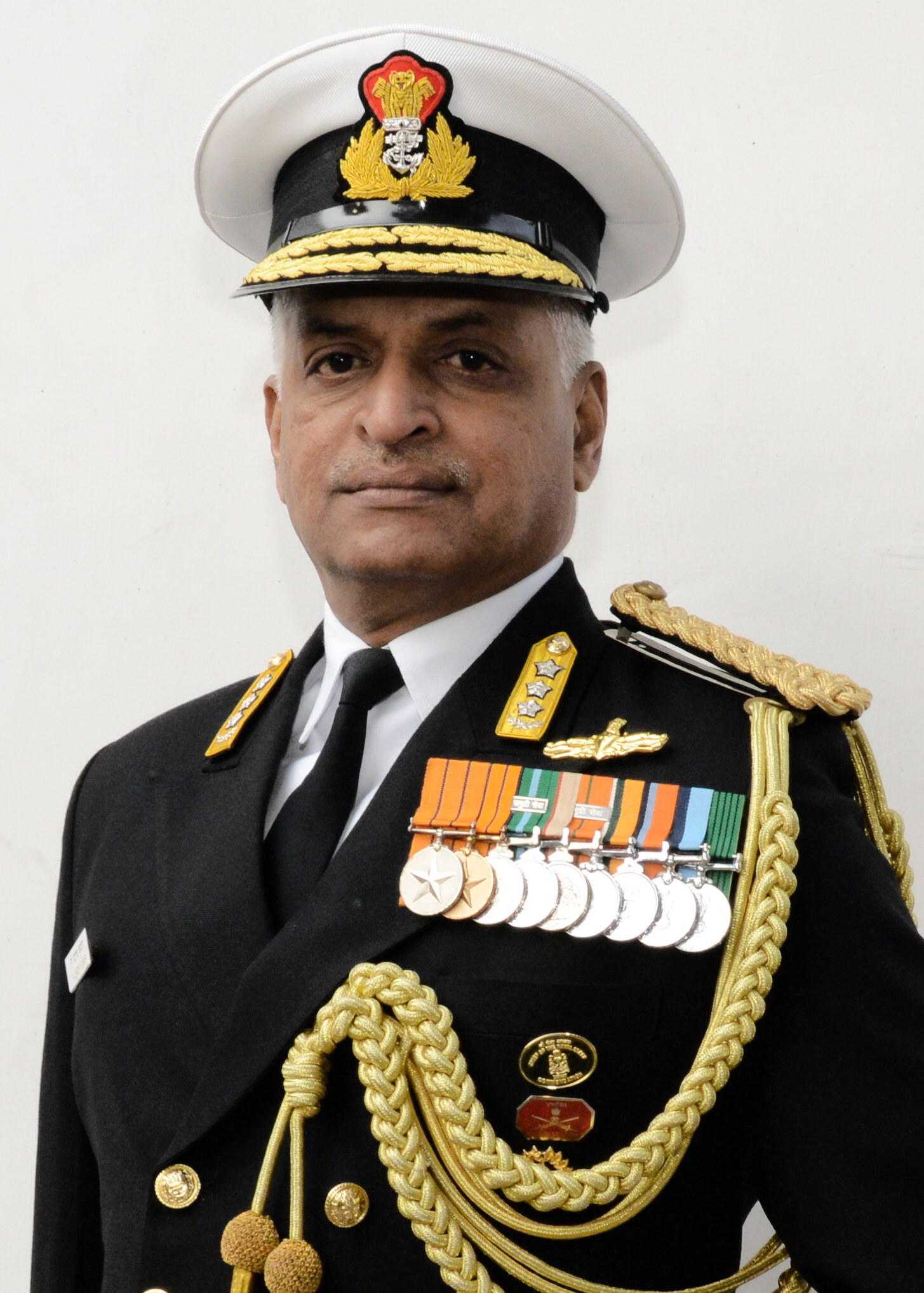
- Military career
- Allegiance: India
- Branch: Indian Navy
- Service years: 1 July 1982 - 31 July 2021
- Rank: Vice Admiral
- Commands: INS Ranvir; INS Kulish
- Awards: Param Vishisht Seva Medal; Ati Vishisht Seva Medal; Vishisht Seva Medal

Vice Admiral G. Ashok Kumar PVSM, AVSM, VSM is a retired flag officer in the Indian Navy. He last served as the national maritime security coordinator, working within the National Security Council Secretariat under the National Security Advisor Ajit Doval. He served as the 35th vice chief of the naval staff. He assumed the position on 30 January 2019 from Vice Admiral Ajit Kumar, who took over the Western Naval Command. He retired on 31 July 2021 after 39 years of service. He is succeeded by Vice Admiral Satish Namdeo Ghormade.

== Early life and education ==
He is an alumnus of Sainik School, Amaravathinagar, Tamil Nadu, where he was the house captain of Chera House. He then entered the National Defence Academy, Pune.

== Career ==
Kumar was commissioned into the Executive Branch of the Navy on 1 July 1982. He is a navigation specialist. He completed his specialisation at Kochi in 1989. Post this, he served as a navigation officer of the frigates INS Beas and INS Nilgiri, the destroyer INS Ranvir and the aircraft carrier INS Vikrant.

During his career, he has attended the Defence Services Staff College, Wellington, the Higher Command Course at the Army War College, Mhow and the Expeditionary Operations course at Quantico, Virginia.

Kumar has commanded the Kora-class corvette INS Kulish (P63) and the destroyer INS Ranvir. He has also served as the executive officer of INS Brahmaputra. Ashore, he has served as the head of Training Team (Navy) at the Defence Services Staff College, Wellington, the defence advisor at the High Commission of India in Singapore and the chief staff officer (operations) of the Western Naval Command.

=== Flag rank ===
After Kumar was promoted to flag rank as a rear admiral, he has held the appointments of flag officer sea training (FOST), chief of staff of the Southern Naval Command and flag officer Maharashtra and Gujarat (FOMAG). In the rank of vice admiral, he has served as the commandant of his alma mater – the National Defence Academy and as the deputy chief of naval staff.

On 30 January 2019, Kumar was appointed the 35th vice chief of the naval staff. He took over from Vice Admiral Ajit Kumar P, who took over as Flag Officer Commanding-in-Chief Western Naval Command.

Vice Admiral G Ashok Kumar took over as the first national maritime security coordinator of India on 16 Feb 2022.

== Awards and decorations ==
Kumar has been awarded the Param Vishisht Seva Medal, the Ati Vishisht Seva Medal and the Vishisht Seva Medal.

Param Vishisht Seva Medal	Ati Vishisht Seva Medal	Vishisht Seva Medal	Samanya Seva Medal
Operation Parakram Medal	Sainya Seva Medal	50th Anniversary of Independence Medal	30 Years Long Service Medal
	20 Years Long Service Medal	9 Years Long Service Medal	

== Personal life ==
He and his wife Ms. Geetha Ashok have two daughters - Shruti and Swati

Military offices
Preceded by Harish Bisht	Flag Officer Sea Training; 2011 - 2012	Succeeded by S. K. Grewal
Preceded by Karambir Singh	Flag Officer Commanding Maharashtra and Gujarat Naval Area; 2013 - 2014	Succeeded by Murlidhar Sadashiv Pawar
Preceded by R. Hari Kumar	Flag Officer Sea Training; 2014 - 2015	Succeeded by Murlidhar Sadashiv Pawar
Preceded by Air Marshal Rakesh Kumar Singh Bhadauria	Commandant of the National Defence Academy; 2015 - 2016	Succeeded by Air Marshal Jasjit Singh Kler
Preceded by Karambir Singh	Deputy Chief of Naval Staff; 2016 - 2019	Succeeded by Murlidhar Sadashiv Pawar
Preceded by Ajit Kumar P	Vice Chief of Naval Staff; 2019 - 2021	Succeeded by Satish Namdeo Ghormade
