= R. Hari Kumar =

Retired Indian Navy admiral

Admiral Radhakrishnan Hari Kumar PVSM, AVSM, VSM, ADC
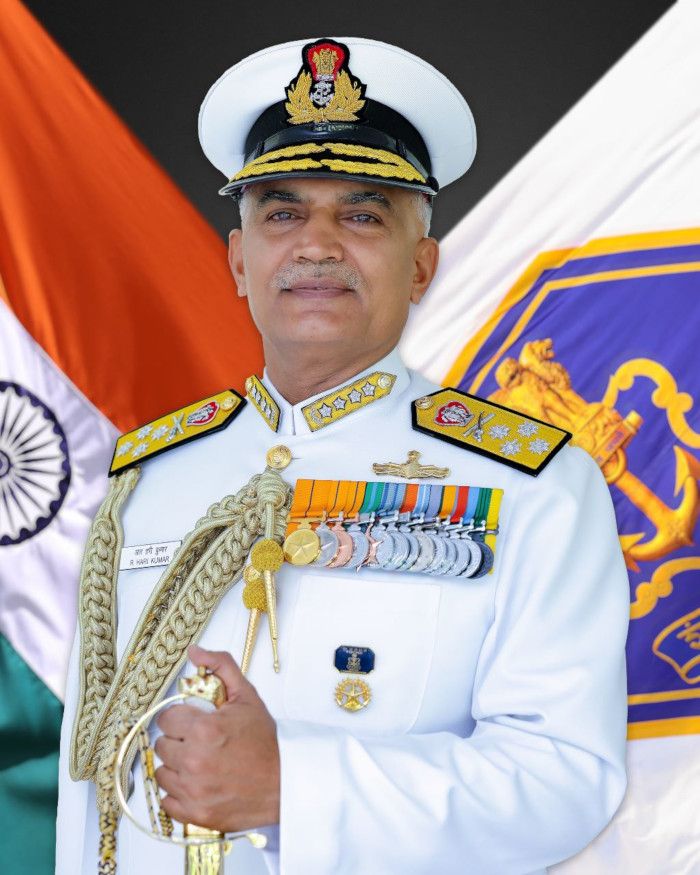
- Official portrait, 2022

25th Chief of the Naval Staff
- In office 30 November 2021 – 30 April 2024
- President: Ram Nath Kovind; Droupadi Murmu
- Prime Minister: Narendra Modi
- Preceded by: Karambir Singh
- Succeeded by: Dinesh K Tripathi

Flag Officer Commanding-in-Chief Western Naval Command
- In office 28 February 2021 – 29 November 2021
- Preceded by: Ajit Kumar P
- Succeeded by: Ajendra Bahadur Singh

Vice Chief of Defence Staff
- In office 4 January 2020 – 28 February 2021
- Preceded by: Office established
- Succeeded by: Atul Kumar Jain

Personal details
- Born: 12 April 1962 (age 64) Thiruvananthapuram, Kerala, India
- Spouse: Kala Nair (m. 1989)
- Children: 1
- Awards: Param Vishisht Seva Medal; Ati Vishisht Seva Medal; Vishisht Seva Medal

Military service
- Allegiance: India
- Branch: Indian Navy
- Service years: 1 January 1983 – 30 April 2024
- Rank: Admiral
- Commands: Western Naval Command; Integrated Defence Staff; Western Fleet; INS Viraat; INS Ranvir; INS Kora; INS Nishank
- Service number: 02540-Y

Admiral Radhakrishnan Hari Kumar PVSM, AVSM, VSM, ADC (born 12 April 1962) is a retired flag officer in the Indian Navy. He served as 25th Chief of the Naval Staff (CNS). Previously, he served as the Flag Officer Commanding-in-Chief, Western Naval Command. In his prior appointments, he served as the Chief of Integrated Defence Staff, Chief of Personnel, Controller of Personnel Services, the Flag Officer Commanding Western Fleet, Flag Officer Sea Training and the Chief of the Staff of the Western Naval Command.

== Early life and education ==
Kumar was born on 12 April 1962 in Thiruvananthapuram, to M. Radhakrishnan Nair and B. Vijayalakshmi to a Malayali Nair family. His father worked with the Fertilisers and Chemicals Travancore in the sales department. He was the eldest of three boys born to the couple.

Kumar was educated at Sacred Hearts Convent School, Thanjavur, Carmel Convent School, Thiruvananthapuram, and at Mannam Memorial Residential High School, Thiruvananthapuram. He completed his pre-degree course at the Government Arts College, Thiruvananthapuram.

He joined the 61st course of the National Defence Academy (NDA) in January 1979 and was assigned to the Juliet squadron. He graduated from the NDA in December 1981. In 1996, he attended the Naval Staff Course at the United States Naval War College in Newport, Rhode Island. He attended the Army Higher Command Course at the Army War College, Mhow in 2004 and the Royal College of Defence Studies, London in 2009.

He holds a bachelor's degree from Jawaharlal Nehru University and a master's degree from King's College London. He holds an MPhil in Defence and Strategic Studies from the University of Mumbai. He also holds a postgraduate diploma in shipping management from the Narottam Morarjee Institute of Shipping in Mumbai. He is an alumnus of National Defence Academy, the Naval War College, the Army War College, Mhow and the Royal College of Defence Studies.

== Career ==
Kumar was commissioned into the Indian Navy on 1 January 1983. He specialised in gunnery. His positions included gunnery officer (GO) of the Rajput-class destroyer INS Ranjit, the commissioning GO of INS Ranvir and commissioning GO of the Khukri-class corvette INS Kuthar. He also served as executive officer (EXO) of Veer-class corvette INS Vipul.

As a commanding officer, he commanded the Coast Guard Ship C-01, the missile boat INS Nishank, the Kora-class missile corvette INS Kora, the Rajput-class destroyer INS Ranvir, and Centaur-class aircraft carrier INS Viraat. He was awarded the Vishisht Seva Medal for his command of the Ranvir when the mid-life upgrade was completed in which the ship was retrofitted with the BrahMos supersonic cruise missiles.

His fleet appointments include Fleet Gunnery Officer and Fleet Operations Officer of the Western Fleet. His staff assignments include Command GO of the Western Naval Command, and naval advisor to the Government of Seychelles. He also served as the Training Commander of the gunnery school INS Dronacharya. During the second phase of the UN intervention in Somalia, from December 1992 to June 1993, he served in the Civil and Military Operations Centre in Mogadishu.

=== Flag rank ===
On promotion to flag rank, Kumar was appointed the first Commandant of the Naval War College, Goa in January 2012. After a two-year stint, he was appointed Flag Officer Sea Training (FOST) and was responsible for the operational sea training of all personnel of Naval and Coast Guard ships and submarines. On 1 October 2014, he took command of the Western Fleet. While serving as the Flag Officer Commanding Western Fleet (FOCWF), he was promoted to the rank of Vice Admiral.

In October 2015, he relinquished command of the Western Fleet, handing over to Rear Admiral Ravneet Singh. For his command of the fleet, he was awarded the Ati Vishisht Seva Medal on 26 January 2016. He was then appointed Chief of the Staff (CoS) of the Western Naval Command in Mumbai. During his tenure as CoS, the International Fleet Review 2016 took place. He subsequently moved to Naval HQ as the Controller of Personnel Services (CPS). On 1 August 2018, he assumed charge as the Chief of Personnel (COP), succeeding Vice Admiral Anil Kumar Chawla.

After an 18-month tenure as COP, Kumar was promoted to Commander-in-Chief (C-in-C) grade and appointed Chief of Integrated Defence Staff (CISC). During his tenure as CISC, the Department of Military Affairs was created by the Government of India and the appointment of Chief of Defence Staff was created. For his tenure as CISC, he was awarded the Param Vishisht Seva Medal on 26 January 2021. On 28 February 2021, he was appointed Flag Officer Commanding-in-Chief Western Naval Command, taking over from Vice Admiral Ajit Kumar P.

=== Chief of Naval Staff ===
On 9 November 2021, the Government of India appointed Kumar as the next Chief of Naval Staff. He took office after superannuation of Admiral Karambir Singh on 30 November 2021 and served there till 30 April 2024.

== Personal life ==
Kumar is married to Kala Nair (née Haripad), with whom he has a daughter. He enjoys swimming, playing badminton and walking.

== Awards and decorations ==
During his career, he has been awarded the Vishisht Seva Medal (VSM) in 2010, the Ati Vishisht Seva Medal (AVSM) in 2016 and the Param Vishisht Seva Medal (PVSM) in 2021 for his service.

Param Vishisht Seva Medal	Ati Vishisht Seva Medal	Vishisht Seva Medal	Samanya Seva Medal
Operation Vijay Star	Operation Vijay Medal	Sainya Seva Medal	Videsh Seva Medal
75th Anniversary of Independence Medal	50th Anniversary of Independence Medal	30 Years Long Service Medal	20 Years Long Service Medal
9 Years Long Service Medal	UNOSOM II Medal		Order of the Rising Sun, 2nd Class

== Gallery ==
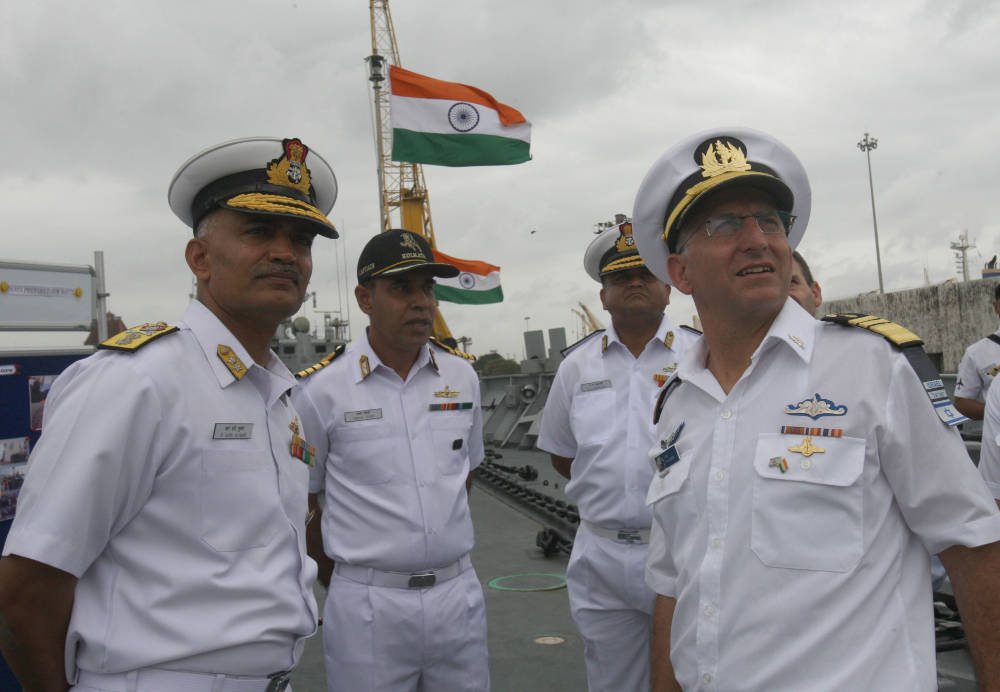
Israeli VAdm. Ram Rutberg with Kumar and other personnel

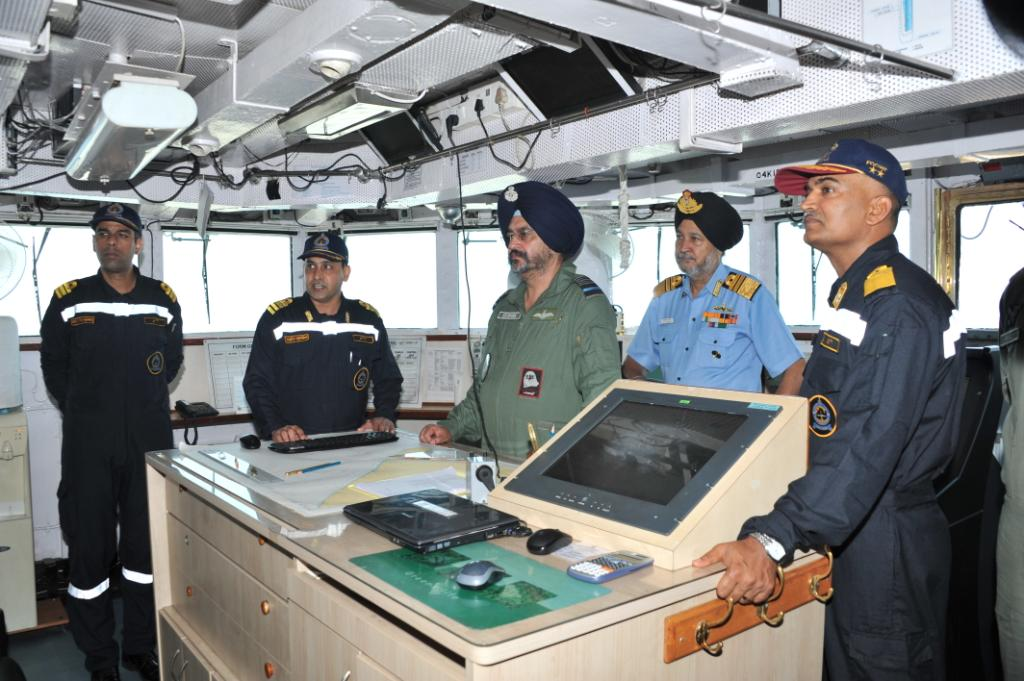
VAdm. S. P. S. Cheema and Air Marshal BS Dhanoa being briefed by Kumar

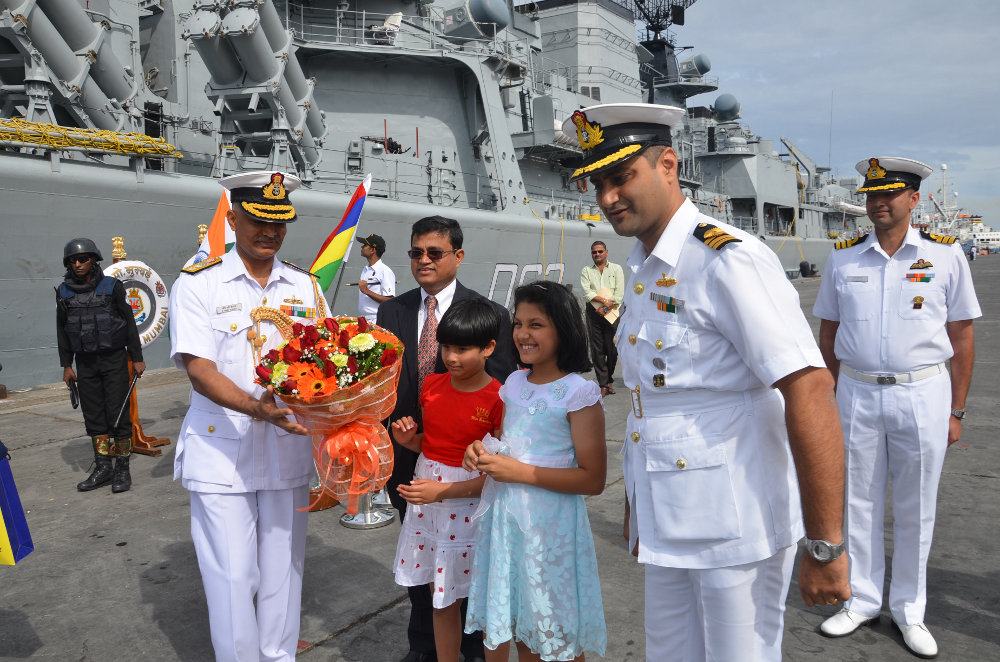
Maldivian naval officers welcome Indian Navy personnel at Port Louis, Mauritius, in 2014.

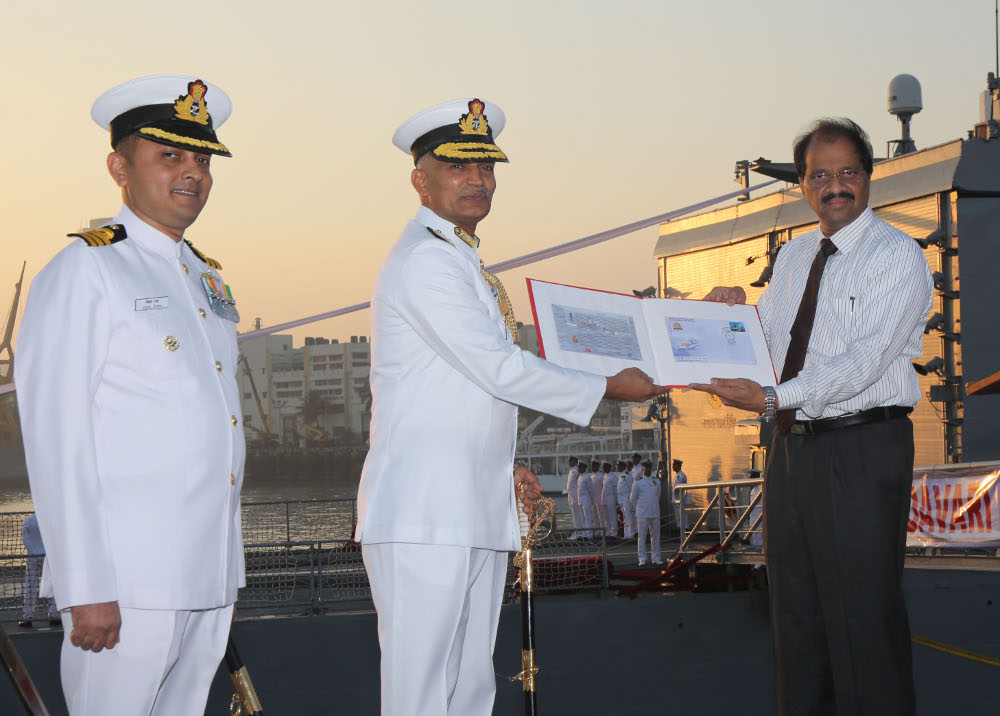
INS Godavari decommissioning ceremony

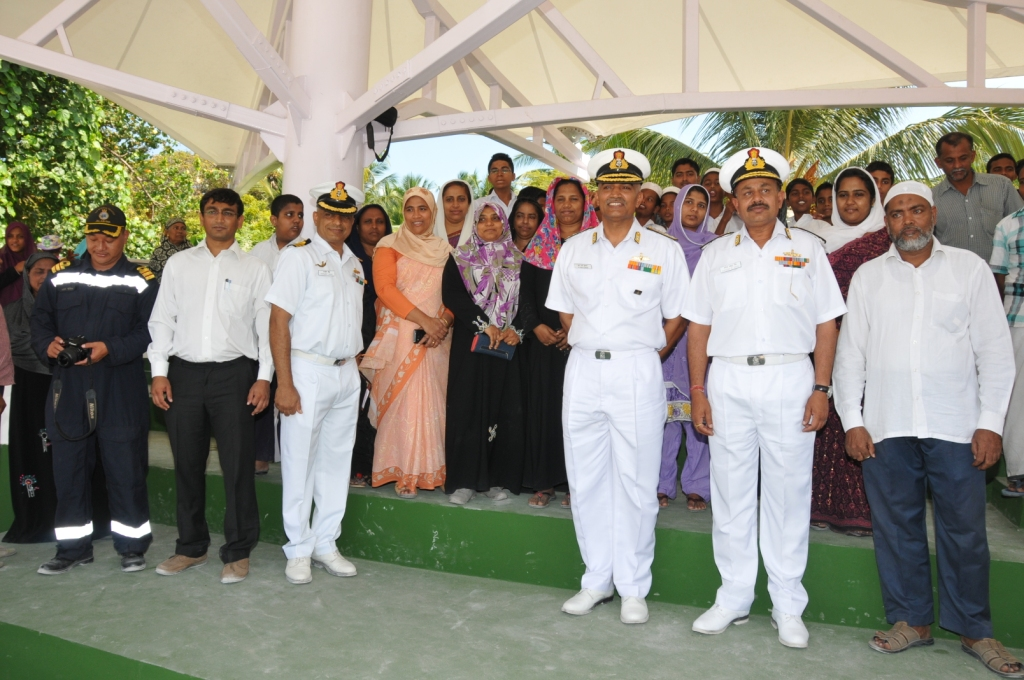
RAdm R. Hari Kumar, FOCWF (third from right), and RAdm A. B. Singh (second from right) interacting with local populace in Lakshadweep during disaster relief exercises in 2016.

Military offices
Preceded by Anil Kumar Chawla	Commanding Officer INS Viraat; 6 August 2010 – 5 November 2011	Succeeded by Ajendra Bahadur Singh
New title Appointment created	Commandant Naval War College, Goa; 2012 – 2013	Succeeded by Monty Khanna
Preceded by Murlidhar Sadashiv Pawar	Flag Officer Sea Training; 2013 – 2014	Succeeded by G. Ashok Kumar
Preceded by Anil Kumar Chawla	Flag Officer Commanding Western Fleet; 2014 – 2015	Succeeded by Ravneet Singh
Preceded by Anil Kumar Chawla	Chief of Personnel; 2018 – 2019	Succeeded by Ravneet Singh
Preceded by Lieutenant General P S Rajeshwar	Chief of Integrated Defence Staff; 2019 – 2021	Succeeded by Vice Admiral Atul Kumar Jain
Preceded by Ajit Kumar P	Flag Officer Commanding-in-Chief Western Naval Command; 28 February 2021 – 29 November 2021	Succeeded by Ajendra Bahadur Singh
Preceded by Karambir Singh	Chief of Naval Staff; 30 November 2021 – 30 April 2024	Succeeded by Dinesh K Tripathi
