= Parasurama Naidu Murugesan =

Vice Admiral P Murugesan PVSM, AVSM, VSM
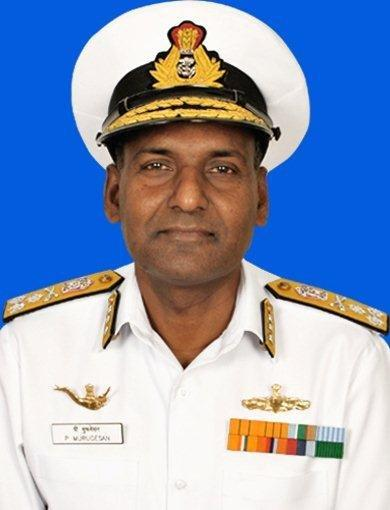
- Military career
- Allegiance: India
- Branch: Indian Navy
- Service years: 01 January 1979–present
- Rank: Vice Admiral
- Commands: Flag Officer Commanding Eastern Fleet; Assistant Chief of Naval Staff (Foreign Cooperation and Intelligence); INS Ranjit; INS Gharial (L23); INS Agray (1991)
- Awards: Ati Vishist Seva Medal (2011); Vishisht Seva Medal (2008)

Vice Admiral P Murugesan is a former Flag Officer of the Indian Navy. He served as the Vice Chief of the Naval Staff (VCNS) from March 2015 to May 2016.

== Career ==
Murugesan was the Chief of Staff of the Western Naval Command and Chief of Personnel at New Delhi. Commissioned into the Indian Navy on 01 Jan 1979, the Flag Officer is a specialist in Navigation and Direction and an alumnus of the Naval Command College, Newport, USA. His Command tenures include Commands of Indian Naval Ships Ranjit, INS Gharial (L23) and Agray, the last two of which he had the honor of Commissioning into the Indian Navy.

His key staff appointments before flag rank include, Principal Director of Naval Operations, Naval Attache to Washington, USA, and Directing Staff at DSSC, Wellington and College of Naval Warfare, Mumbai. As a Flag Officer, he has held the appointments of Assistant Chief of Personnel (Human Resource Development), Flag Officer Commanding Eastern Fleet and Assistant Chief of Naval Staff (Foreign Cooperation and Intelligence).

== Awards ==
Vice Admiral P Murugesan has been awarded with the Ati Vishist Seva Medal and the Vishisht Seva Medal in 2011 and 2008 respectively.

| Ati Vishisht Seva Medal |
| Vishisht Seva Medal |
| 30 Years Long Service Medal |
| 20 Years Long Service Medal |
| 9 Years Long Service Medal |

Military offices
| Preceded by A G Thapliyal | Chief of Personnel; 2013-2015 | Succeeded by Abhay Raghunath Karve |
