= INS Talwar =

The following ships of the Indian Navy have been named INS Talwar:

- INS Talwar (F140) was a Type 12, Whitby-class frigate commissioned in 1959, which served in the Portuguese-Indian War and the Indo-Pakistani War of 1971
- INS Talwar (F40) is the lead ship of her class, currently in active service with the Indian Navy
