= Lectionary 16 =

Lectionary ℓ 16
- New Testament manuscript
- Text: Evangelistarion
- Date: 12th-century
- Script: Greek
- Now at: Bibliothèque nationale de France
- Size: 27 cm by 21.6 cm

Lectionary 16, designated by siglum ℓ 16 (in the Gregory-Aland numbering). It is a Greek manuscript of the New Testament, on vellum leaves. Palaeographically it has been assigned to the 12th-century.

== Description ==
The codex contains lessons from the Gospels of John, Matthew, Luke lectionary (Evangelistarium), with numerous lacunae. It is written in Greek minuscule letters, on 199 parchment leaves (27 cm by 21.6 cm), 2 columns per page, 18-20 lines per page.

Currently the codex is located in the Bibliothèque nationale de France (Gr. 297) in Paris.

It was added to the list of the New Testament manuscripts by Johann Jakob Wettstein. It was slightly examined by Scholz and Paulin Martin. C. R. Gregory saw it in 1885.

The manuscript is not cited in the critical editions of the Greek New Testament (UBS3).

== See also ==
- List of New Testament lectionaries
- Biblical manuscript
- Textual criticism

== Bibliography ==
- Gregory, Caspar René (1900). Textkritik des Neuen Testaments. Vol. 1. Leipzig: J.C. Hinrichs. p. 388.
