= INS Kuthar =

The following ships of the Indian Navy have been named INS Kuthar:

- INS Kuthar (F146) was a Type 14 Blackwood-class frigate commissioned in 1959
- INS Kuthar (P46) is a Khukri-class corvette, currently in active service with the Indian Navy
