= Hansa-Brandenburg L.16 =

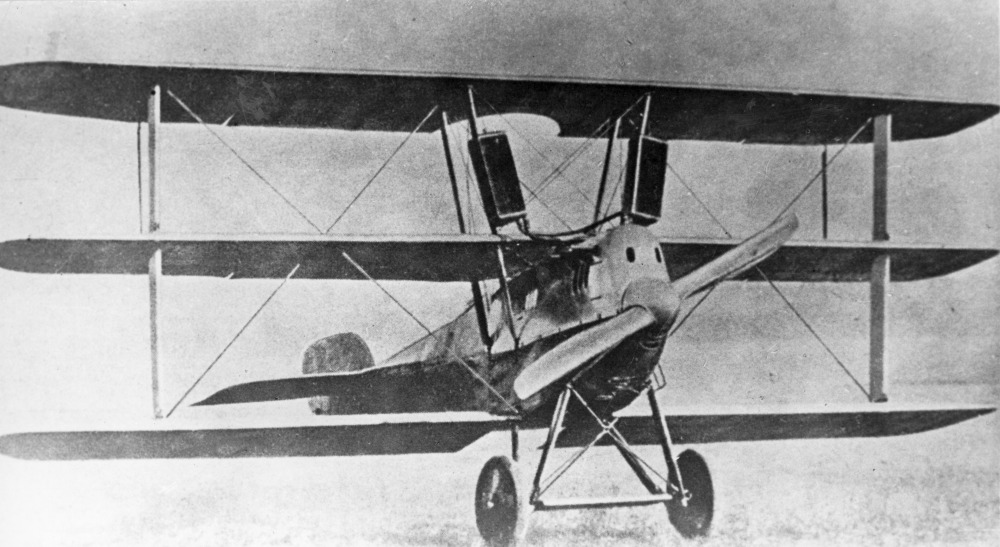

General information
- Type: Prototype triplane fighter
- Manufacturer: Hansa-Brandenburg
- Primary user: Austro-Hungarian Empire
- Number built: 1

History
- First flight: 1917

The Hansa-Brandenburg L.16 was an experimental triplane fighter built by the Hansa-Brandenburg Aircraft Company (Hansa Brandenburgische Flugzeugwerke) for the Austro-Hungarian Army's (Landstreitkräfte Österreich-Ungarns) Aviation Troops (Luftfahrtruppen) during World War I. A single prototype was ordered in 1917, but it was not ordered into production.

== Design and development ==
The success of the British Sopwith Triplane in early 1917 despite the overall dominance of the German Albatros D.III biplanes caused the Austro-Hungarian Aviation Troops' Aviation Arsenal (Fliegerarsenal, or Flars) to believe that its triplane configuration was the key to its success. Flars did not understand that the extra weight and drag of the third wing limited its rate of climb at high altitude and speed at all altitudes and that the extra wing improved maneuverability and rate of climb at low altitude by reducing the wing loading; it was not a panacea. Flars therefore requested that Hansa-Brandenburg design a triplane fighter in mid-1917. After the specifications of the Sopwith were received, the company over-optimistically replied on 26 June that it would take five to six weeks. Hansa-Brandenburg submitted the L.16's static calculations for approval on 13 August and requested a 200-metric-horsepower (147 kW) Austro-Daimler 6 straight-six engine for the prototype later that month. When Flars's representatives inspected the completed aircraft on 1 December they were startled to see its "surprisingly large dimensions".

The L.16 was a single-seat triplane with equal-span, single-bay wings. The middle wing blocked part of the pilot's forward vision because it was not attached to the top of the fuselage but was slightly above it, mounted on the center I-struts that also supported the upper wings. The cockpit was positioned behind the trailing edge of the middle wing. There was a semi-circular cutout in the upper wing to improve the pilot's view above him. For initial flight testing, two radiators were mounted on the center struts between the middle and upper wings. A later photograph shows minor modifications to the rudder and only a single radiator mounted above the middle wing's leading edge, further compromising the pilot's forward view. This change may indicate that its engine might have been changed to a 185-metric-horsepower (136 kW) model of the Austro-Daimler 6.

The aircraft had been turned over to Phönix Flugzeugwerke, a company that was also owned by Hansa-Brandenburg's owner, by 1 March 1918 and it was hangared at Aspern airfield, but was only flight tested sporadically. The L.16 was stored there by 20 June and remained there until the end of the war in November.

== Specifications ==
Data from Austro-Hungarian Army Aircraft of World War One

General characteristics

- Crew: 1
- Length: 7.17 m (23 ft 6 in)
- Upper wingspan: 9 m (29 ft 6 in)
- Mid wingspan: 9 m (29 ft 6 in)
- Lower wingspan: 9 m (29 ft 6 in)
- Height: 2.82 m (9 ft 3 in)
- Wing area: 33.5 m^{2} (361 sq ft)
- Empty weight: 740 kg (1,631 lb)
- Gross weight: 935 kg (2,061 lb)
- Powerplant: 1 × Austro-Daimler 6 water-cooled straight-six engine, 138 kW (185 hp)
- Propellers: 2-bladed fixed-pitch

Performance

- Maximum speed: 190 km/h (120 mph, 100 kn)
- Time to altitude: 1,000 m (3,300 ft) in 1 minute (estimated)

Armament

- Guns: 2 × fixed, forward-firing 8 mm (0.315 in) Schwarzlose machine guns
