= INS Ranjit =

The following ships of the Indian Navy have been named Ranjit:

- INS Ranjit (1949) was a R-class destroyer acquired in 1949 from the Royal Navy, where it served in World War II as HMS Redoubt (H41)
- INS Ranjit (D53) is a Rajput-class destroyer, currently in active service with the Indian Navy
