= INS Nashak =

The following ships of the Indian Navy have been named INS Nashak:

- INS Nashak (K87) was a Vidyut-class missile boat of the Indian Navy which served in the Indo-Pakistani War of 1971
- INS Nashak (K83) is a Veer-class corvette, currently in active service with the Indian Navy
