= INS Shardul =

The following ships of the Indian Navy have been named INS Shardul:

- INS Shardul (1975) was a Kumbhir-class landing ship, decommissioned in 1997
- INS Shardul (2004) is the lead ship of her class of amphibious warfare vessels, currently in active service
