= Operation Parakram Medal =

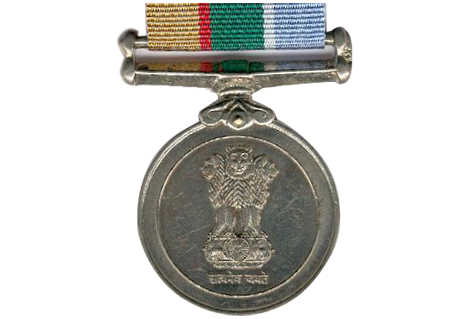
- Type: Military medal Service medal
- Awarded for: Recognition of the services of Armed Forces personnel and civilians in Operation Parakram
- Country: India
- Presented by: Govt. of India
- Ribbon

Precedence
- Next (higher): Operation Vijay Medal
- Next (lower): Sainya Seva Medal

Operations Parakram Medal is a military award of India. It was awarded in recognition of the services of Armed Forces personnel and civilians in Operation Parakram. All ranks of the Indian Armed Forces including Territorial Army, Auxiliary and Reserve Forces, Nursing officers and other members of the Nursing services and other lawfully constituted Armed Forces who were involved in the operation were awarded the medal.

== History ==
The President instituted this medal for recognition of the services of Armed Forces personnel and civilians in the Operation Parakram on 13 December 2001.

== Design ==
The medal is circular in shape, made of cupro-nickel, 35mm in diameter and fitted to a plain horizontal bar with standard fittings. It has the map of India and inscription “OPERATION PARAKRAM” embossed both in Hindi and English along the rim. On its reverse it has the state emblem embossed in a circle.

The riband 32 mm in width with three equal parts of Blue, Olive Green and Sand colour, starting right to left. Blue and Olive Green parts are separated by a white stripe 2mm in width. Olive Green and Sand Colour parts are separated by a red stripe of 2mm in width

== See also ==
- Ati Vishisht Seva Medal
