= Operation Vijay Medal =

Indian service medal

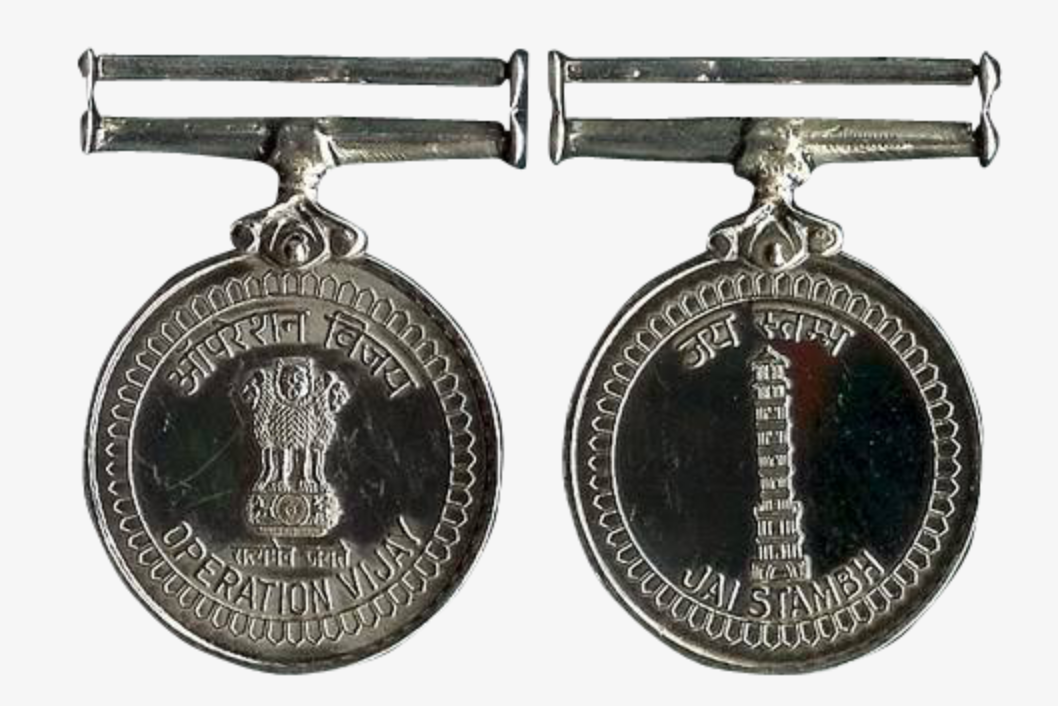
- Operation Vijay Medal
- Type: Military medal Service medal
- Awarded for: Active service in designated operations within the battle zone
- Presented by: India
- Eligibility: Members of the Indian Armed Forces, Territorial Army, Para Military Force, Central Police Organisations, and Police Forces
- Campaign: Kargil War
- Established: 2001
- Operation Vijay Ribbon Bar

Precedence
- Next (higher): Sangram Medal
- Next (lower): Operation Parakram Medal
- Related: Operation Vijay Star

The Operation Vijay Medal is a service medal that recognises Armed Forces personnel and civilians who were part of the larger Indian armed forces fraternity including the Army, Navy and Air Force, and who were involved or mobilized during operations at various field locations as well as Headquarters during Operation Vijay in 1999.

== Criteria ==
The medal is awarded to all personnel of the Army, Navy, Air Force, Para Military Forces, Central Police Forces, Railway Protection Forces, J&K State Police Forces, Home Guards, Civil defence organizations and any other organization specified by Government in operational areas during Operation Vijay. The areas designated as operation areas included specific locations in Jammu and Kashmir, Punjab, Gujarat and Rajasthan.

== Design ==
The medal is styled and designated as "Operation Vijay Medal". It is made of cupro nickel, is circular in shape, and is 35mm in diameter. The medal is worn suspended from a silk riband that is 32 mm in width that consists of a grey background divided into four equal parts by three 2mm stripes that are red, dark blue and light blue in colour. Embossed on the medal's obverse is the Jai Stambh

The Indian state had a problem with the availability of copper-nickel (nickel silver) ribbon for minting medals at the beginning of this century, so the state is unable to issue medals to all eligible persons. This problem persists to this day.

The gap in the lack of awards is filled by the so-called "tailors copy" (tailor's copies, the expression "voentorg copy" will be more understandable to Russian readers) – models of various quality made by private manufacturers. As a rule, such copies have a different, unofficial suspension for the ribbon and do not have the data of the cavalier on the edge (but, according to online resources, this service is already offered by "military tailors").
