= Biswajit Dasgupta =

Indian navy officer

Vice Admiral Biswajit Dasgupta PVSM, AVSM, YSM, VSM
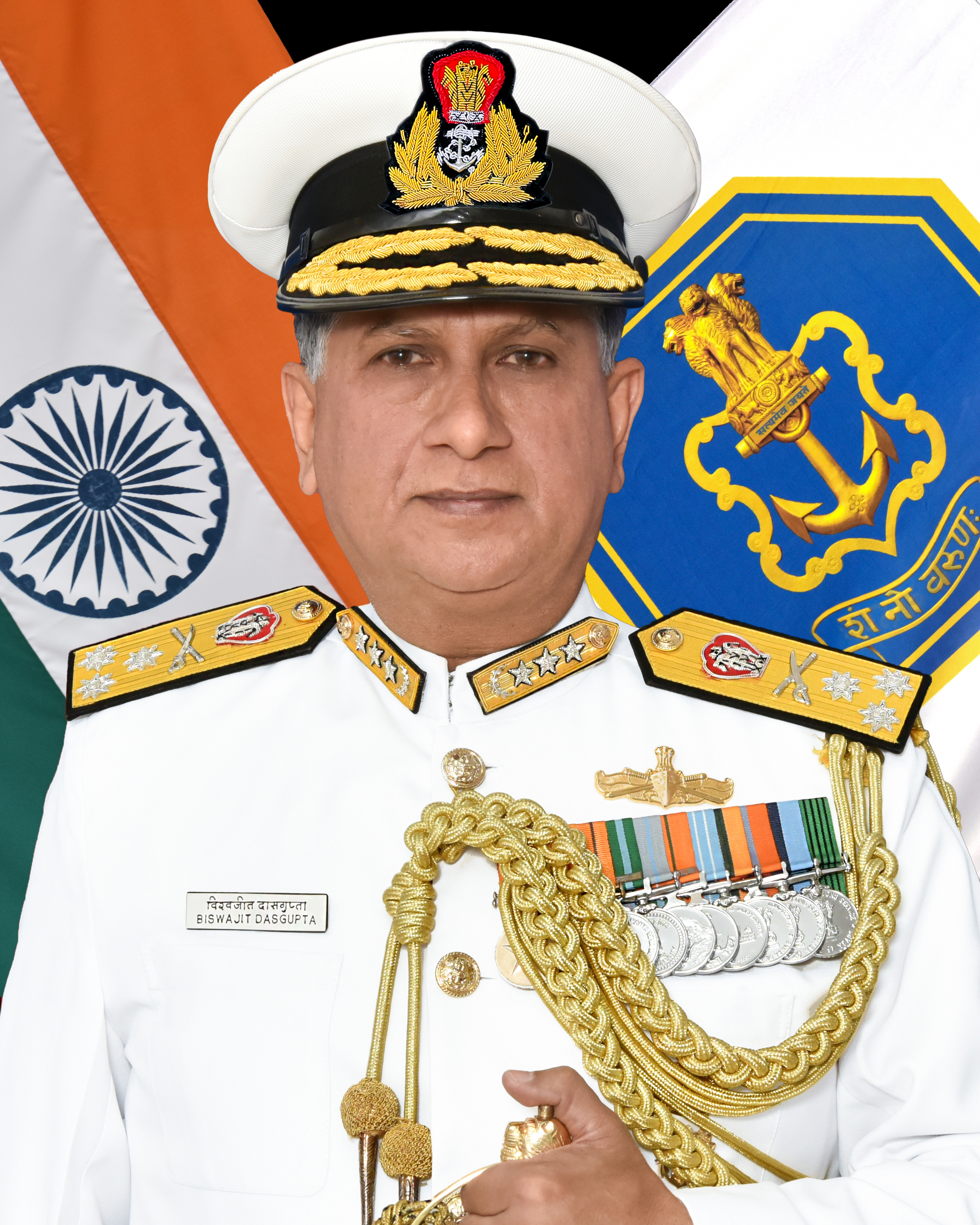

Flag Officer Commanding-in-Chief Eastern Naval Command
- In office 1 December 2021 – 31 July 2023
- Preceded by: Ajendra Bahadur Singh
- Succeeded by: Rajesh Pendharkar

Personal details
- Awards: Param Vishisht Seva Medal; Ati Vishisht Seva Medal; Yudh Seva Medal; Vishisht Seva Medal

Military service
- Allegiance: India
- Branch/service: Indian Navy
- Years of service: 1985 - 31 July 2023
- Rank: Vice Admiral
- Commands: Eastern Naval Command; Eastern Fleet; INS Viraat; INS Tabar (F44); INS Karmuk (P64); INS Nishank (K43)
- Service Number: 02782-Y

Vice Admiral Biswajit Dasgupta, PVSM, AVSM, YSM, VSM is a retired officer of the Indian Navy. He served as the Flag Officer Commanding-in-Chief, Eastern Naval Command. He had earlier served as the Chief of Staff of ENC from 2020 to 2021, Controller of Personnel Services at Naval HQ from 2019 to 2020 and as the Flag Officer Commanding Eastern Fleet (FOCEF) from 2016 to 2018.

He currently serves as the National Maritime Security Coordinator (NMSC) in the National Security Council Secretariat.

== Early life and education ==
Dasgupta graduated from the National Defence Academy, Pune.

== Naval career ==
Dasgupta was commissioned into the Indian Navy in the Executive branch in 1985. He is a specialist in Navigation and Direction. In the early years of his career, he served as the Navigating Officer of the Pondicherry-class minesweeper INS Bhavnagar, the Arnala-class corvette INS Androth and the Rajput-class guided missile destroyer INS Ranvir. He has served as the flag lieutenant to the Director General of the Indian Coast Guard. He also served briefly as the Deputy Squadron Commander of the Chukar Aerial Target Squadron.

He has completed the staff course at the Defence Services Command and Staff College (DSCSC) in Dhaka, Bangladesh, the higher command course at the Army War College, Mhow. He has also attended the National Defence College, New Delhi.

Dasgupta has commanded the Veer-class missile vessel INS Nishank, the Kora-class corvette INS Karmuk as the commissioning commanding officer, the Talwar-class guided missile frigate INS Tabar and was the 20th commanding officer of the aircraft carrier INS Viraat. He has also served as the second-in-command of the Astravahini-class torpedo recovery vessel INS Astravahini.

Dasgupta has served as the Fleet Operations Officer of the Western Fleet. In his staff appointments, he has served as the Commander Work Up and as the Staff Officer (ND) at Naval HQ. In his instructional appointments, Dasgupta has served as directing staff at the Defence Services Staff College, Wellington and as the Officer-in-Charge Navigation and Direction School. As a commodore, Dasgupta served as the Naval Assistant (NA) to the Chief of the Naval Staff.

=== Flag Rank ===
On promotion to flag rank, Dasgupta took over as the Chief Staff Officer (Operations) (CSO Ops) at the Western Naval Command. As the CSO Ops, he played a pivotal role in planning and conducting Operation Neer. He also led the planning and successful execution of Operation Raahat during the Saudi Arabian-led intervention in Yemen. For these two operations, he was awarded the Yudh Seva Medal (YSM).

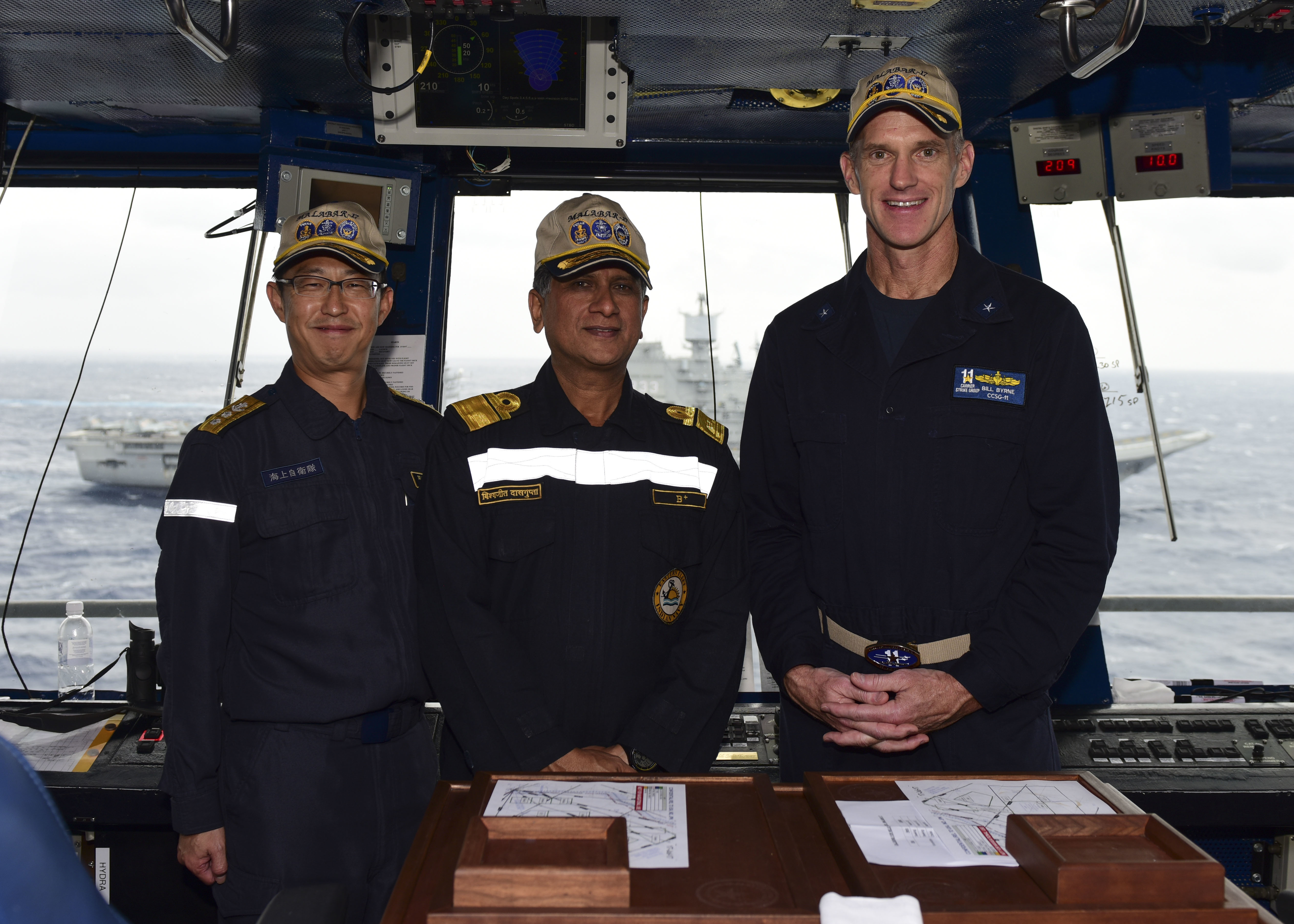
RAdm Biswajit Dasgupta (FOCEF) (center) with RAdm Yoshihiro Goka (Commander, Escort Flotilla One) (left) and RDML Bill Bryne (Commander, Carrier Strike Group 11) (right) aboard USS Nimitz during Exercise Malabar 2017

The citation for the YSM reads as follows:

CITATION

Rear Admiral Biswajit Dasgupta

Chief Staff Officer (Operations), Western Naval Command

The officer has significantly and actively contributed to the planning, conduct and successful accomplishment of mission of national and humanitarian importance, and the resultant positive image of India in the Indian Navy. For this exceptional and distinguished service in planning and execution of naval missions in the conflict zone of Yemen resulting in evacuation of Indian nationals from the war zone, response to the national water crisis in Maldives and towards co-ordination of all operational activities resulting in the saving of 33 lives at sea, Rear Admiral Biswajit Dasgupta is awarded the Yudh Seva Medal.

On 14 October 2016, Dasgupta assumed the office of Flag Officer Commanding Eastern Fleet, taking over from Rear Admiral S. V. Bhokare. For his command of the Eastern Fleet, Dasgupta was awarded the Ati Vishisht Seva Medal on 26 January 2018. He handed over charge of the Eastern Fleet to Rear Admiral Dinesh K Tripathi on 15 January 2018.

On 12 June 2019, on promotion to the rank of Vice Admiral, Dasgupta took over as the Controller of Personnel Services at Naval Headquarters. On 12 June 2020, he took over as the Chief of Staff of the Eastern Naval Command from Vice Admiral Satish Namdeo Ghormade.

He took over the reins as Flag Officer Commanding-in-Chief, Eastern Naval Command succeeding Vice Admiral Ajendra Bahadur Singh on 1 December 2021. He superannuated on 31 July 2023, and was succeeded Rajesh Pendharkar.

In April 2025, Dasgupta was appointed the National Maritime Security Coordinator (NMSC). The NMSC serves as the principal adviser to the government on maritime security matters, operating within the National Security Council Secretariat (NSCS), headed by National Security Advisor Ajit Doval.

== Awards and decorations ==
He was awarded PVSM on 26 January 2023.

Param Vishisht Seva Medal	Ati Vishisht Seva Medal	Yudh Seva Medal	Vishisht Seva Medal
Samanya Seva Medal	Operation Vijay Medal	Sainya Seva Medal	Videsh Seva Medal
75th Independence Anniversary Medal	50th Anniversary of Independence Medal		30 Years Long Service Medal
20 Years Long Service Medal		9 Years Long Service Medal	

== See also ==
- Flag Officer Commanding Eastern Fleet
- Eastern Fleet

Military offices
Preceded by Ajendra Bahadur Singh	Commanding officer INS Viraat; 2013 – 2015	Succeeded by Rajesh Pendharkar
Preceded by S. V. Bhokare	Flag Officer Commanding Eastern Fleet; 2016 – 2018	Succeeded by Dinesh K Tripathi
Preceded by Satishkumar Namdeo Ghormade	Chief of Staff, Eastern Naval Command; 2020 – 2021	Succeeded by Sanjay Vatsayan
Preceded by Ajendra Bahadur Singh	Flag Officer Commanding-in-Chief, Eastern Naval Command; 1 December 2021 – 31 July 2023	Succeeded by Rajesh Pendharkar
