= Controller of Personnel Services =

- Flag of the Vice Admiral

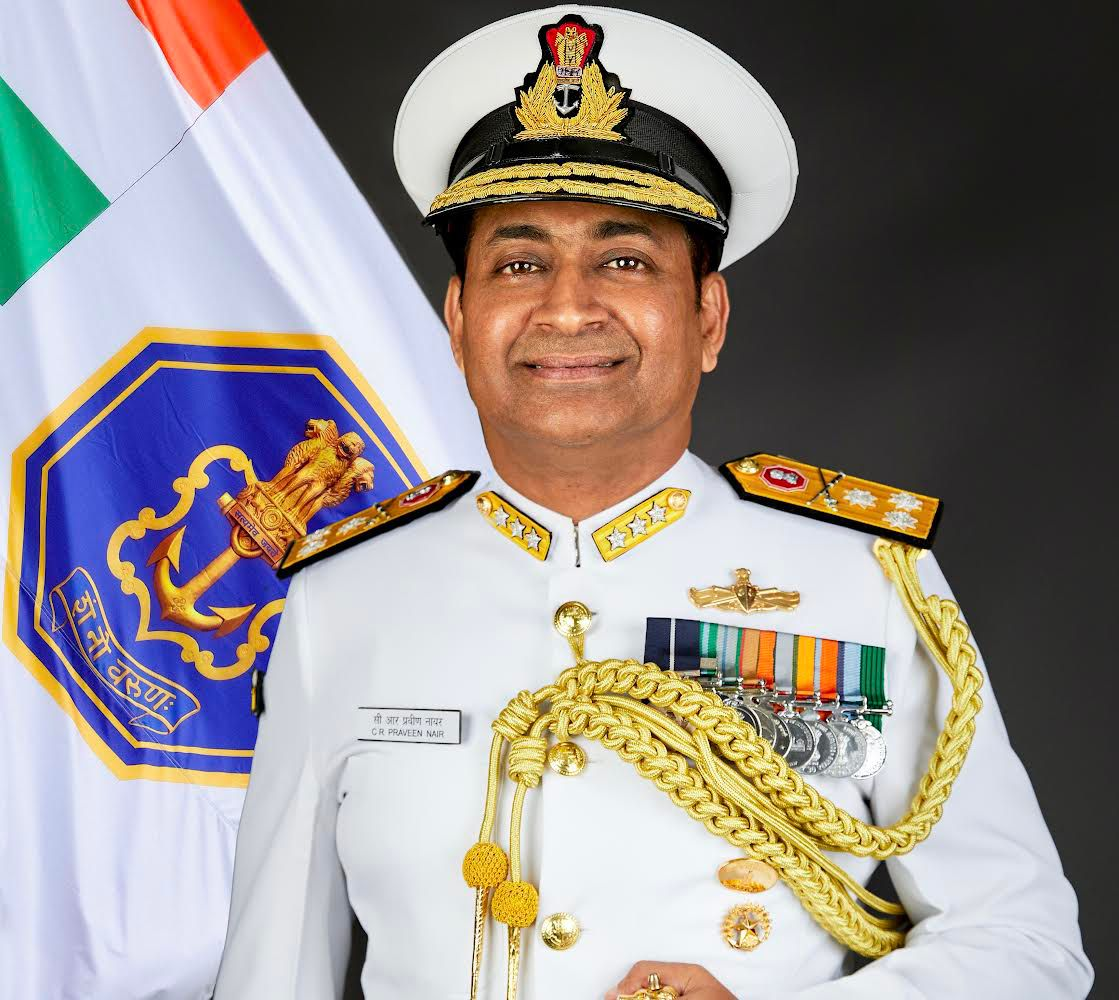
- Incumbent; Vice Admiral C. R. Praveen Nair AVSM NM since 31 July 2025
- Indian Navy
- Type: Controller
- Abbreviation: CPS
- Reports to: Chief of Personnel
- Seat: Naval Headquarters, New Delhi

The Controller of Personnel Services (CPS) is a senior appointment in the Indian Navy. A Controller at Naval Headquarters (NHQ) in the rank of Vice-Admiral, the CPS is responsible for service conditions, welfare, pay, pension, as well as matters pertaining to recruitment, training and discipline. The current CPS is Vice Admiral C. R. Praveen Nair who took over in July 2025.

== History ==
The billet of CPS was created in March 2000 to devolve some of the Chief of Personnel's responsibilities. A significant portion of the COP’s duties involved oversight of projects, schools, messes, shore establishments, discipline, and ceremonial functions. The delegation of these duties to the CPS enabled the COP to devote greater attention to matters relating to human resource development and career planning.

== Organisation ==
The CPS is a Controller in the Personnel Branch at the Naval Headquarters. The following directorates report into the CPS.

- Directorate of Personnel Services
- Directorate of Naval Education
- Directorate of Ex-Servicemen Affairs
- Directorate of Non Public Fund
- Directorate of Adventure Physical Fitness & Sports Activities

The CPS is also the administrative authority of INS India.

== Appointees ==
Name	Assumed office	Left office	Notes
Vice Admiral Sureesh Mehta AVSM	April 2000	April 2002	Later Chief of the Naval Staff.
Vice Admiral Arun Kumar Singh AVSM NM	October 2003	August 2004	Later Flag Officer Commanding-in-Chief Eastern Naval Command.
Vice Admiral S. K. K. Krishnan AVSM VSM	August 2004	December 2005	
Vice Admiral R. P. Suthan AVSM VSM	January 2006	July 2006	Later Flag Officer Commanding-in-Chief Eastern Naval Command.
Vice Admiral S. K. Damle AVSM NM VSM	July 2006	March 2007	Later Flag Officer Commanding-in-Chief Southern Naval Command.
Vice Admiral D. K. Dewan AVSM	March 2007	July 2007	
Vice Admiral Shekhar Sinha AVSM NM &bar	January 2008	June 2011	Later Flag Officer Commanding-in-Chief Western Naval Command.
Vice Admiral SPS Cheema AVSM NM	July 2011		Later Flag Officer Commanding-in-Chief Western Naval Command.
Vice Admiral Rama Kant Pattanaik AVSM YSM	January 2012		Later Deputy Chief of the Naval Staff.
Vice Admiral HCS Bisht AVSM	September 2011	January 2015	Later Flag Officer Commanding-in-Chief Eastern Naval Command.
Vice Admiral Atul Kumar Jain AVSM VSM	April 2015	September 2016	Later Flag Officer Commanding-in-Chief Eastern Naval Command.
Vice Admiral R. Hari Kumar AVSM VSM	September 2016	July 2018	Later Chief of the Naval Staff.
Vice Admiral Biswajit Dasgupta AVSM YSM VSM	August 2018	June 2020	Later Flag Officer Commanding-in-Chief Eastern Naval Command.
Vice Admiral Satish Ghormade AVSM NM		March 2021	Later Vice Chief of the Naval Staff.
Vice Admiral Sanjay Jasjit Singh AVSM NM	March 2021	August 2021	Later Flag Officer Commanding-in-Chief Western Naval Command.
Vice Admiral Suraj Berry AVSM NM VSM	August 2021	March 2023	Later Commander-in-Chief, Strategic Forces Command.
Vice Admiral Krishna Swaminathan AVSM VSM	April 2023	October 2023	Current Chief of the Naval Staff.
Vice Admiral Gurcharan Singh AVSM NM	15 January 2024	May 2024	Current Chief of Personnel.
Vice Admiral Vineet McCarty AVSM	3 September 2024	July 2025	Current Commander-in-Chief, Andaman and Nicobar Command.
Vice Admiral C. R. Praveen Nair AVSM NM	31 July 2025	Present	Current CPS.

== Bibliography ==
- Hiranandani, G.M. (2009), Transition to Guardianship: History of the Indian Navy, 1991-2000, Lancer, ISBN 978-1935501268
