= Dinesh Singh Rana =

Lieutenant General in the Indian Army

Lieutenant General Dinesh Singh Rana PVSM AVSM YSM SM
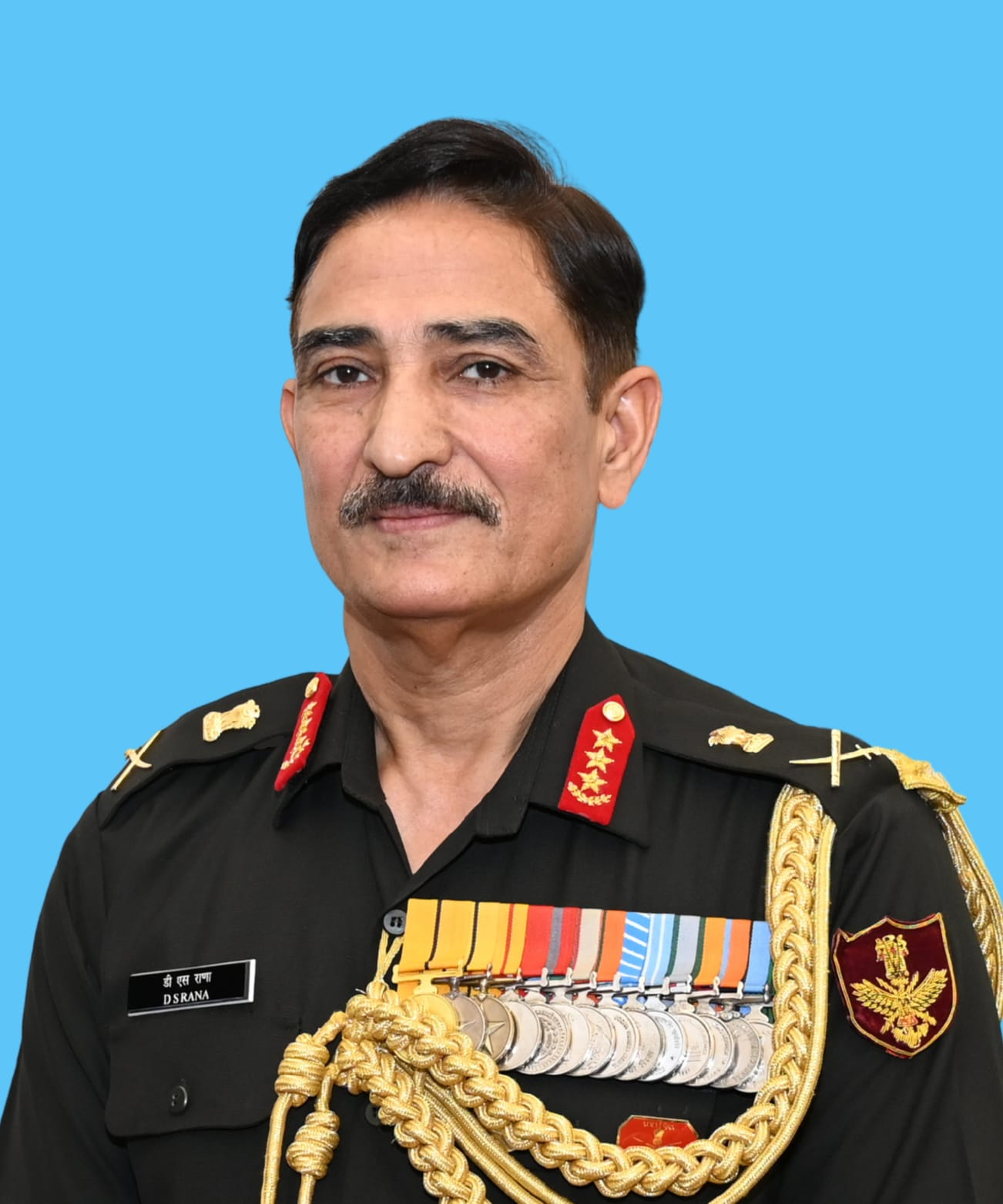

Commander-in-Chief Strategic Forces Command
- Incumbent
- Assumed office 1 October 2025
- Chief of Defence Staff: Anil Chauhan; N. S. Raja Subramani
- Preceded by: Suraj Berry

Commander-in-Chief Andaman and Nicobar Command
- In office 1 June 2025 – 30 September 2025
- Chief of Defence Staff: Anil Chauhan
- Preceded by: Saju Balakrishnan
- Succeeded by: Ajay Kochhar

Military service
- Allegiance: India
- Branch/service: Indian Army
- Years of service: 19 December 1987 – present
- Rank: Lieutenant General
- Unit: 10 Garhwal Rifles
- Commands: Strategic Forces Command; Andaman and Nicobar Command; IV Corps; 10 Garhwal Rifles
- Service number: IC-47020Y
- Awards: Param Vishisht Seva Medal; Ati Vishisht Seva Medal; Yudh Seva Medal; Sena Medal

Lieutenant General Dinesh Singh Rana PVSM, AVSM, YSM, SM is a serving general officer of the Indian Army. He currently serves as the Commander-in-Chief, Strategic Forces Command. He was previously serving as the Commander-in-Chief, Andaman and Nicobar Command. He earlier served as the Director General, Defence Intelligence Agency, prior to that he was General Officer Commanding IV Corps. He is also the Colonel of the Regiment of the Garhwal Rifles since 28 June 2025.

== Early life and education ==
The general officer is an alumnus of the National Defence Academy, Khadakwasla and the Indian Military Academy, Dehradun. He is also an alumnus of Defence Services Staff College, Wellington, National Defence College, New Delhi. He also went to the Centre for National Defence Studies, Madrid and the National Defense University, United States. He also holds a Ph.D. on China’s Defence modernization. The General is a Scholar Warrior and has authored various research papers and articles on leadership and strategic issues.

== Military career ==
He was commissioned into the 10th battalion of the Garhwal Rifles on 19 December 1987 from the Indian Military Academy, Dehradun. In a career spanning over 37 years, the general officer has held diverse operational, instructional, and staff appointments across various terrains and theatres. He has served with the Indian Military Training Team and the United Nations Interim Force in Lebanon. As Colonel, he commanded the same battalion he was commissioned into. He has been an instructor at the Indian Military Academy, Dehradun, at the College of Defence Management, Secunderabad, and with the Higher Command Wing at Army War College, Mhow. His staff appointments include those of a brigade major of an independent armoured brigade, Deputy Director General Staff Duties, Brigadier Military Intelligence (East), Provost Marshal. He has also commanded an infantry brigade and division in the Eastern Sector.

After getting promoted to the rank of Lieutenant General, he was appointed as the Director General of Staff Duties at the IHQ of MoD (Army) in New Delhi. After a short stint as DG SD, on 21 March 2022, he took over as the General Officer Commanding IV Corps in the Eastern theatre. A year later on 31 March 2023, he assumed the appointment of Director General, Defence Intelligence Agency (DG DIA).

On 1 June 2025, Lieutenant General Dinesh Singh Rana took over as the Commander-in-Chief, Andaman and Nicobar Command (CINCAN), making history as the first Chief of Defence Intelligence to be elevated to the rank of Commander-in-Chief, reflecting the importance of defence intelligence and jointmanship. The general officer also assumed the mantle of the Colonel of the Regiment of the Garhwal Rifles on 28 June 2025 succeeding Lieutenant General N. S. Raja Subramani. After assuming mantle of the 23rd Colonel of the Regiment, he reaffirmed his commitment to furthering the ethos, discipline, and martial legacy of the Veer Garhwali warriors who have always stood steadfast in service of the nation.

== Awards and decorations ==
The General officer has been awarded with the Param Vishisht Seva Medal in 2025, the Ati Vishisht Seva Medal in 2021, the Yudh Seva Medal in 2015 and the Sena Medal in 1993. He was also awarded the Chief of Army Staff Commendation Card for gallantry in Kashmir.

Param Vishisht Seva Medal	Ati Vishisht Seva Medal		Yudh Seva Medal
Sena Medal	Special Service Medal	Operation Parakram Medal	Sainya Seva Medal
High Altitude Medal	Videsh Seva Medal	75th Independence Anniversary Medal	50th Independence Anniversary Medal
30 Years Long Service Medal	20 Years Long Service Medal	9 Years Long Service Medal	UNIFIL

== Dates of rank ==
Insignia	Rank	Component	Date of rank
	Second Lieutenant	Indian Army	19 December 1987
	Lieutenant	Indian Army	19 December 1989
	Captain	Indian Army	19 December 1992
	Major	Indian Army	19 December 1998
	Lieutenant Colonel	Indian Army	16 December 2004
	Colonel	Indian Army	1 January 2008
	Brigadier	Indian Army	25 October 2013 (acting) 1 November 2014 (substantive, with seniority from 27 January 2012)
	Major General	Indian Army	1 September 2019 (seniority from 1 January 2018)
	Lieutenant General	Indian Army	30 September 2021

Military offices
Preceded by Suraj Berry	Commander-in-Chief; Strategic Forces Command; 1 October 2025 - present	Succeeded by Incumbent
Preceded by Saju Balakrishnan	Commander-in-Chief; Andaman and Nicobar Command; 1 June 2025 - 30 September 2025	Succeeded by Ajay Kochhar
Preceded by GAV Reddy	Director General; Defence Intelligence Agency; 31 March 2023 - 31 May 2025	Succeeded by Shrinjay Pratap Singh
Preceded by Ravin Khosla	General Officer Commanding; IV Corps; 21 March 2022 - 28 March 2023	Succeeded by Manish Erry
