= 81st Armoured Regiment (India) =

Indian Army regiment

81 Armoured Regiment
- Active: 1973 – present
- Country: India
- Allegiance: India
- Branch: Indian Army
- Type: Armoured Corps
- Size: Regiment
- Mottos: शौर्यं तेजो युद्धे Shaurya Tejo Yuddhe (Heroism and boldness in battle)

Commanders
- Colonel of the Regiment: Lieutenant General Devendra Sharma
- Notable commanders: Lt Gen Arun Gautam, Lt Gen Ajai Singh

Insignia
- Abbreviation: 81 Armd Regt

The 81 Armoured Regiment is an armoured regiment of the Indian Army.

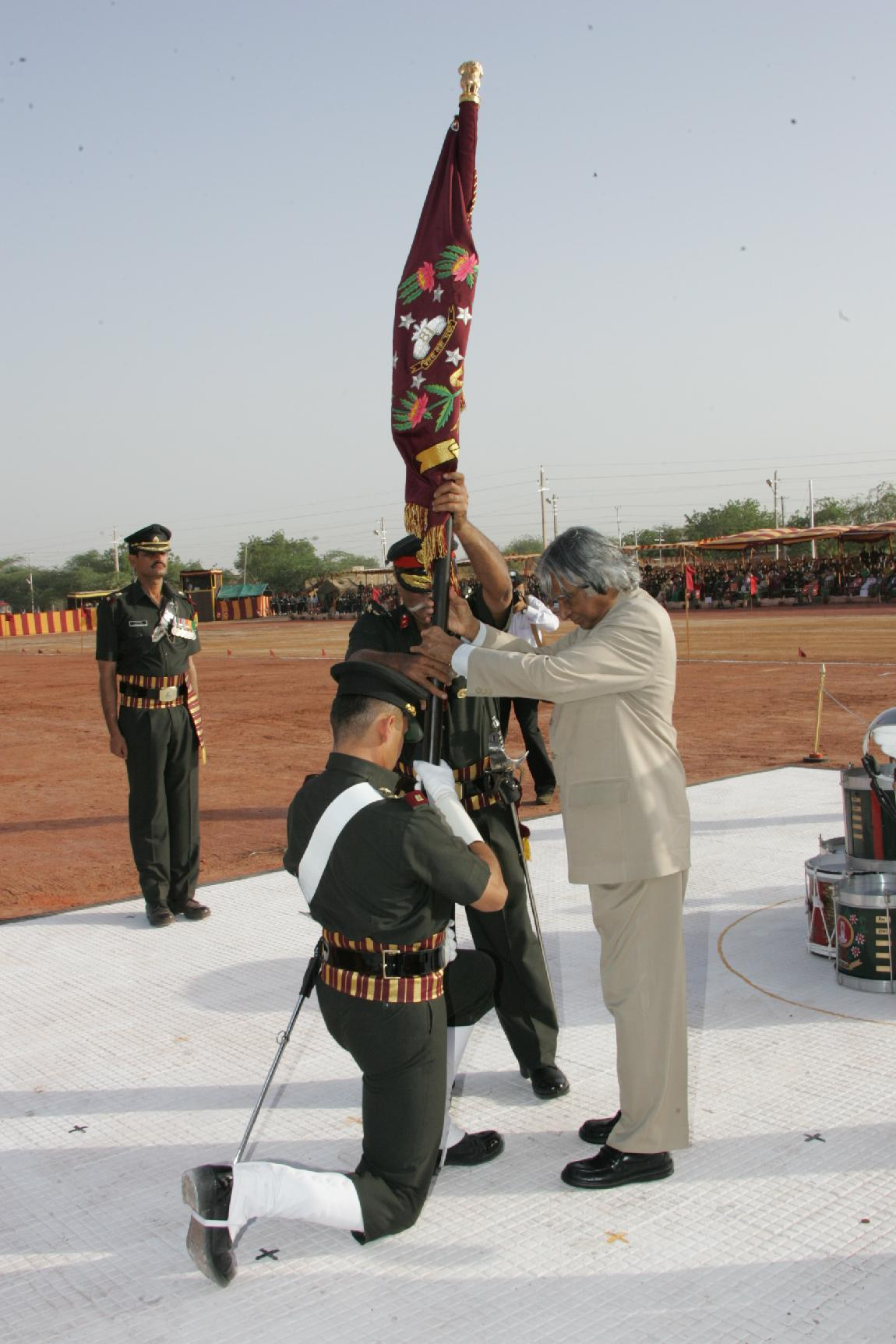
Presentation of the Standard at Jodhpur on 16 May 2005 by the President of India, Dr APJ Abdul Kalam

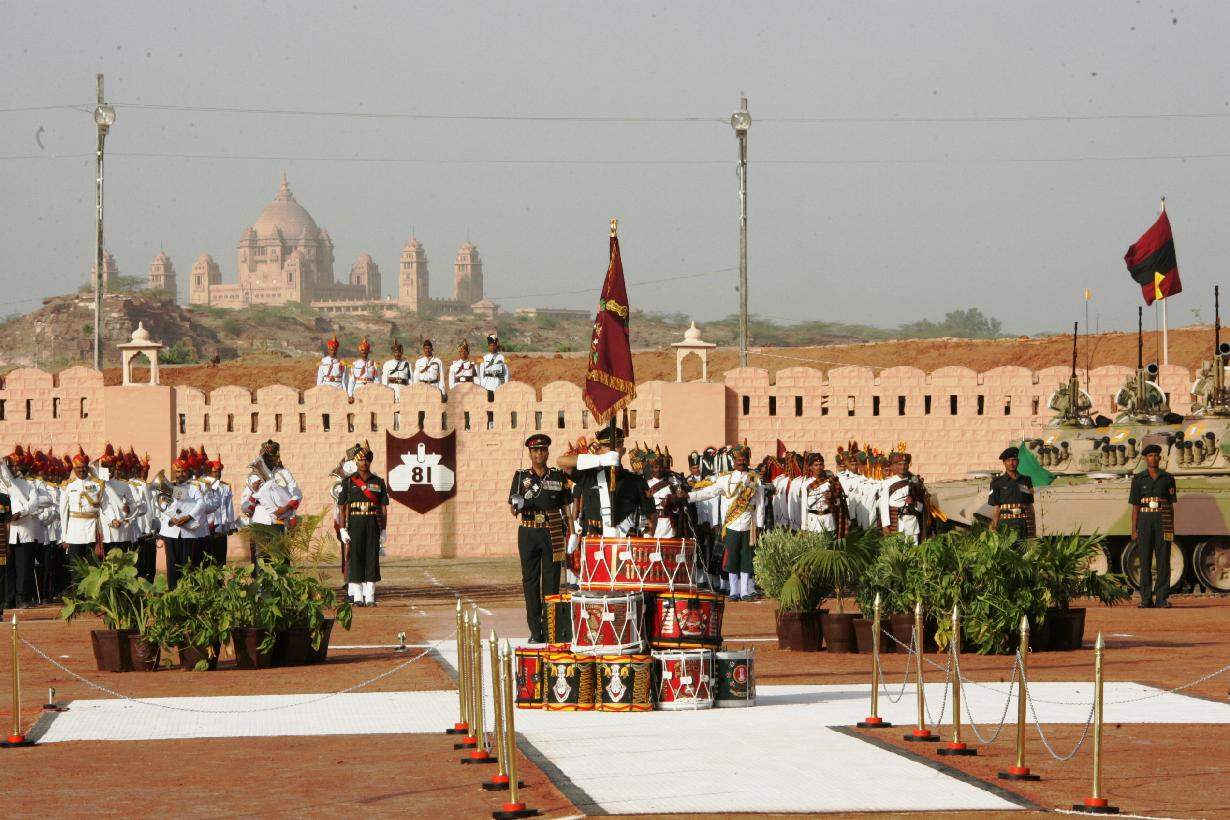
Standard Presentation Ceremony

== Formation ==
The regiment was raised on 1 October 1973. The first commanding officer was Lieutenant Colonel (later Brigadier) NP Singh from Deccan Horse. It has an all-India all-class composition, drawing troops from various castes and religions.

== History ==
The regiment has participated in Operation Rakshak and Operation Meghdoot.

Two terrorists opened fire at the camp of the 81 Armoured Regiment on the Jammu-Pathankot National Highway, Samba on 21 March 2015. Both were killed in the following encounter.

== Awards and honours ==
The Regiment was presented the ‘President’s Standards’ at Jodhpur on 16 May 2005 by the President of India, Dr A. P. J. Abdul Kalam. It was awarded the COAS Unit Citation during the Army Day Parade in 2023.

Members of the regiment have won one Shaurya Chakra, one Param Vishisht Seva Medal, one Vishisht Seva Medal and one Sena Medal.

== Regimental insignia ==
The regimental insignia consists of front face of a tank with numeral "81" inscribed on the tank’s hull, a scroll added at the base with the regimental motto inscribed in Devanagari script on it.

The motto of the regiment is शौर्यं तेजो युद्धे (Shaurya Tejo Yuddhe), which is coined from the Bhagavad Gita 18.43 and translates to ‘Heroism and boldness in battle’.
