= INS India =

Naval Base Depot Establishment

INS India
- Nausena Bhawan, Delhi Cantonment, New Delhi in India

Site information
- Type: Naval shore establishment
- Owner: Ministry of Defence
- Operator: Indian Navy
- Condition: Operational

Site history
- In use: 1941 – present

Garrison information
- Current commander: Commodore Vishal Rawal

INS India is a "stone frigate" (shore establishment) of the Indian Navy in New Delhi. The base depot ship is the flagship of the Chief of the Naval Staff of the Indian Navy. The establishment is the only naval establishment in New Delhi and provides administrative and logistics support to all officers and sailors in Naval Headquarters and other units at Delhi.

== History ==
The stone frigate was established on 13 July 1941 as HMIS India. It was a small unit with a complement of few officers and sailors. The establishment was commanded by an officer of the rank of Lieutenant Commander. Receptions in the honour of visiting dignitaries of foreign navies were held in the establishment. During the change of command of the Navy, the outgoing CNS would receive the incoming CNS in INS India. The farewell guard of honour to the outgoing CNS also took place at the establishment.

== Today ==
INS India today is a major establishment in New Delhi with a plethora of duties and responsibilities. The commanding officer of the establishment is also the station commander and is a one-star officer with the rank of Commodore. Since it is the flagship of the Chief of the Naval Staff, the Admiral's flag is hoisted on INS India. In March 2000, the post of Controller of Personnel Services (CPS) was created in the rank of Vice Admiral. The CPS acts as the administrative authority of INS India. The establishment was awarded the unit citation for a naval establishment for the year 2022.

== Crest ==
The crest of INS India consists of a swastika with each of its arms ending in a circle enclosing a smaller swastika. The motif is taken from the ancient coins of Ujjain and represents well-being and good relationship. It also represents the spirit of India and her international outlook.

== See also ==
- List of Indian Navy bases
- List of active Indian Navy ships
- Stone frigate

== Bibliography ==
- Hiranandani, G. M. (2010), Transition to Guardianship: The Indian Navy 1991-2000, Lancer InterConsult, Incorporated, ISBN 978-1935501268
