= Ajai Singh (lieutenant general) =

Indian Army officer

Lieutenant General Ajai Singh PVSM, AVSM
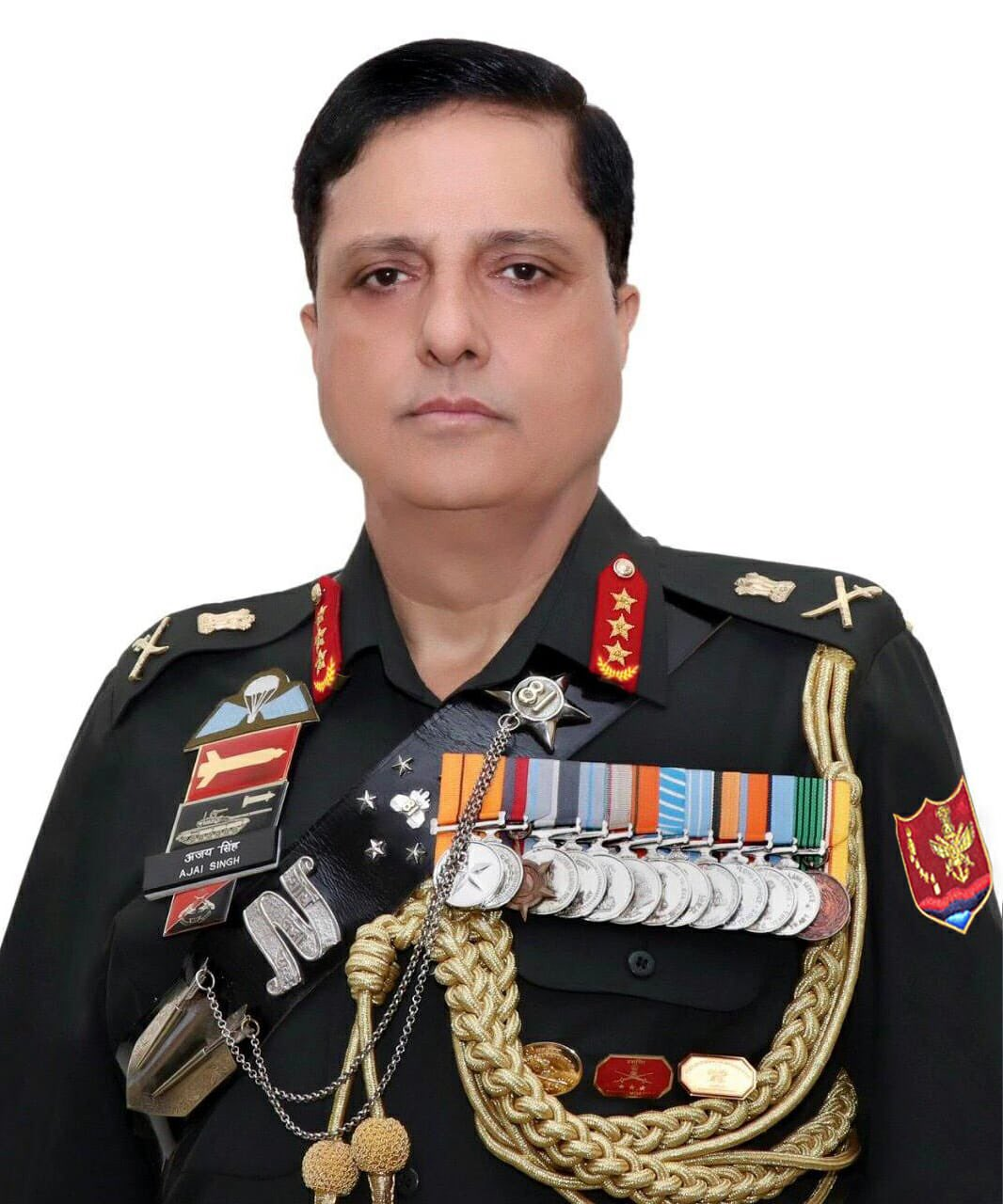
- Military career
- Allegiance: India
- Branch: Indian Army
- Service years: December 1983 – 30 April 2023
- Rank: Lieutenant General
- Service number: IC-41465P
- Unit: 81 Armoured Regiment
- Commands: Andaman and Nicobar Command; X Corps
- Conflicts: Operation Meghdoot; Kargil War
- Awards: Param Vishisht Seva Medal; Ati Vishisht Seva Medal

Lieutenant General Ajai Singh PVSM, AVSM is a retired Indian Army general. He served as the 16th Commander-in-Chief, Andaman and Nicobar Command (CINCAN). He assumed command from Lieutenant-General Manoj Pande, PVSM, AVSM, VSM on 1 June 2021.

== Early life and education ==
Singh was born in an army family. He is a fifth-generation soldier, all of them in the cavalry or armoured corps. The family has been in the army for over 162 years. He attended The Lawrence School, Sanawar. He subsequently attended the National Defence Academy as part of the 63rd course. He then was part of the 73rd course of the Indian Military Academy.

He holds four master's degrees: an MBA with ORSA specialisation, an MSc in defence studies, an MPhil in defence and management studies and an MA in International Security and Strategy from King's College London.

== Career ==
Singh was commissioned in the 81st Armoured Regiment on 17 December 1983. His father had raised the regiment a decade earlier. As a major, he commanded a rifle company of the Maratha Light Infantry during Operation Meghdoot and the Kargil War, receiving the COAS Commendation for Gallantry. He also served with MONUA in Angola as a United Nations military observer.

Singh has attended a mountaineering course at the High Altitude Warfare School and tank gunnery & technology courses. He was also selected to attend a United Nations Senior Mission Leader Course in Indonesia as well as the Royal College of Defence Studies (RCDS), London.

=== General officer ===
Promoted to the rank of major general, Singh was appointed general officer commanding of a division. He then held the post of Additional Director General Military Operations (ADGMO) at Army headquarters. As a Lieutenant General he served as Director General Financial Planning and later Director General Military Training (DGMT) at Army HQ. On 30 July 2019, he was appointed the 30th general officer commanding X Corps at Bathinda.

== Awards and decorations ==

Param Vishisht Seva Medal	Ati Vishisht Seva Medal	Special Service Medal	Operation Vijay Star
Siachen Glacier Medal	Operation Vijay Medal	Operation Parakram Medal	Sainya Seva Medal
High Altitude Medal	Videsh Seva Medal	75th Anniversary of Independence Medal	50th Anniversary of Independence Medal
30 Years Long Service Medal	20 Years Long Service Medal	9 Years Long Service Medal	MONUA Medal

== Dates of rank ==
Insignia	Rank	Component	Date of rank
	Second Lieutenant	Indian Army	17 December 1983
	Lieutenant	Indian Army	17 December 1985
	Captain	Indian Army	17 December 1988
	Major	Indian Army	17 December 1994
	Lieutenant-Colonel	Indian Army	16 December 2004
	Colonel	Indian Army	15 March 2006
	Brigadier	Indian Army	22 October 2010 (acting, substantive 9 December 2010 with seniority from 29 August 2009)
	Major General	Indian Army	1 February 2016 (substantive, seniority from 23 August 2014)
	Lieutenant-General	Indian Army	1 May 2018

Military offices
Preceded by Manoj Pande	Commander-in-Chief, Andaman and Nicobar Command; 1 June 2021 - 30 April 2023	Succeeded by Saju Balakrishnan
Preceded by Raj Shukla	General Officer Commanding X Corps; 1 August 2019 - 25 August 2020	Succeeded by Manoj Kumar Mago
