= Sadasivan Radhakrishnan =

Air Marshal Sadasivan Radhakrishnan PVSM, AVSM
- Military career
- Allegiance: India
- Branch: Indian Air Force
- Service years: 13 June 1970 - 31 August 2009
- Rank: Air Marshal
- Service number: 12408
- Commands: Southern Air Command; Andaman and Nicobar Command

Air Marshal Sadasivan Radhakrishnan PVSM, AVSM, is a retired officer in the Indian Air Force. He served as Air Officer Commanding-in-Chief (AOC-in-C), Southern Air Command. Previously he served as Commander-in-Chief, Andaman and Nicobar Command and also served as a Senior Air Staff Officer (SASO) of the Indian Air Force’s Bangalore based Training Command. An alumnus of the National Defence Academy, he was commissioned into the IAF in June 1970 in the fighter stream. He has the experience of over 4000 hours of flying on a variety of combat and trainer aircraft. He is a Qualified Flying Instructor and a fighter Combat Leader.

He superannuated on 31 August 2009 after a distinguished service of 39 years.

== Honours and decorations ==
During his career, Sadasivan Radhakrishnan has been awarded the Ati Vishisht Seva Medal (AVSM) and the Param Vishisht Seva Medal service.

Param Vishisht Seva Medal	Ati Vishisht Seva Medal

Military offices
Preceded by Suresh Chandra Mukul	Air Officer Commanding-in-Chief, Southern Air Command; 1 October 2008 - 31 August 2009	Succeeded by Sumit Mukerji
Preceded by Packiam Paul Rajkumar	Commander-in-Chief, Andaman and Nicobar Command; 1 January 2008 - 30 September 2008	Succeeded by Pramod Kumar Roy
