= Vineet McCarty =

Commander in Chief, Andaman and Nicobar Command

Vice Admiral Vineet McCarty AVSM
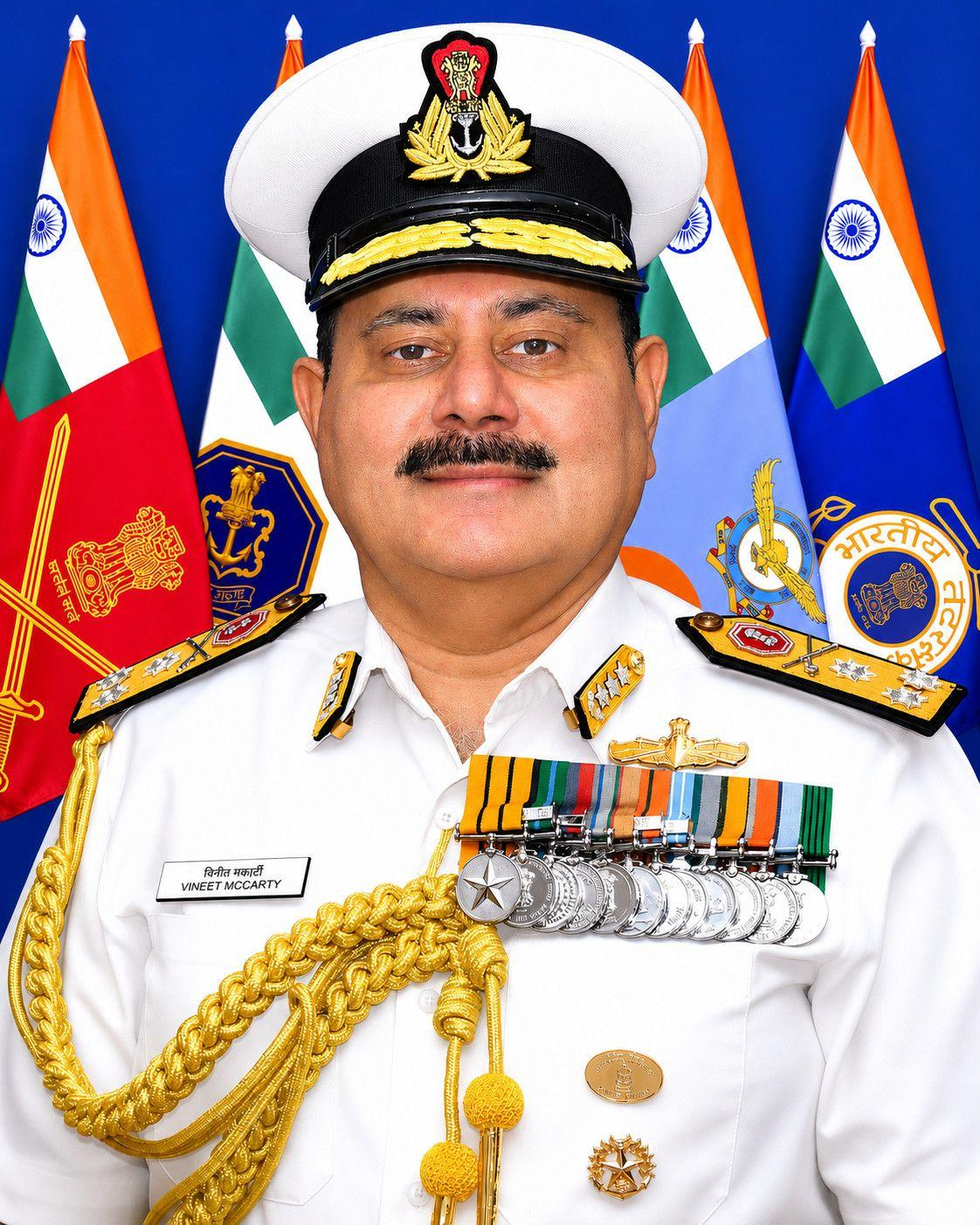

Commander-in-Chief Andaman and Nicobar Command
- Incumbent
- Assumed office 1 June 2026
- Chief of Defence Staff: N. S. Raja Subramani
- Preceded by: Ajay Kochhar

Military service
- Allegiance: India
- Branch/service: Indian Navy
- Years of service: July 1989 – present
- Rank: Vice Admiral
- Commands: Andaman and Nicobar Command; Indian Naval Academy; Western Fleet; INS Shivalik (F47); INS Khanjar (P47); INS Ajay
- Awards: Ati Vishisht Seva Medal

Vice Admiral Vineet McCarty, AVSM is a serving flag officer of the Indian Navy. He currently serves as the Commander-in-Chief, Andaman and Nicobar Command. He earlier served as the Deputy Chief of Integrated Defence Staff (Doctrine, Organisation & Training) and as Deputy Chief of Integrated Defence Staff (Policy Planning & Force Development). He also served as Controller of Personnel Services, as the Commandant of Indian Naval Academy.

== Naval career ==
McCarty was commissioned into the Indian Navy on 1 July 1989. He is a specialist in gunnery. He was a part of the commissioning crew of the lead ship of her class of guided missile destroyers INS Delhi (D61). He did his specialist tenures and served as the gunnery officer of the ship. He attended the Defence Services Staff College, Wellington in 2005.

McCarty served as the Training Commander at the Indian Naval Academy when it was based at Goa. He has also served as the directing staff at the Naval and Maritime Academy, Trincomalee, the naval academy of the Sri Lankan Navy.

McCarty has commanded the Anti-submarine warfare patrol vessel – the Abhay-class corvette INS Ajay. He subsequently commanded the Khukri-class guided-missile corvette INS Khanjar (P47). He also served as the executive officer of a seaward defence patrol vessel and a guided missile vessel. He then served as the executive officer of the only Amphibious transport dock of the Navy INS Jalashwa (L41) and commanded the lead ship of her class of stealth guided missile frigate INS Shivalik (F47). He was in command of Shivalik during the International Fleet Review 2016.

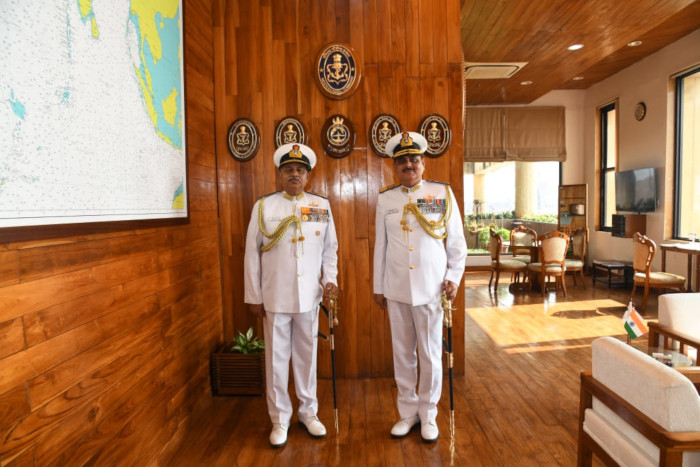
McCarty (right) as FOCWF with Vice Admiral A. B. Singh, FOC-in-C WNC.

In the rank of Captain, McCarty served as the defence adviser to the High Commissioner of India to the Republic of Singapore. During this tenure, he had concurrent accreditation to the Republic of the Philippines. He also served as the Command Plans officer at Headquarters Eastern Naval Command. In 2017, he attended the National Defence College, New Delhi. As a Commodore, he served as the Commodore (Naval Plans) at Naval headquarters, New Delhi.

=== Flag rank ===
McCarty was promoted to flag rank in February 2020 and was appointed Assistant Chief of Naval Staff (Staff Requirements) (ACNS SR) at naval headquarters. He took command of the Western Fleet on 15 November 2022 as the Flag Officer Commanding Western Fleet from Rear Admiral Sameer Saxena. After a year-long tenure, he relinquished charge to Rear Admiral C. R. Praveen Nair. For his tenure as FOCWF, he was awarded the In the same month,

After getting promoted to the rank of Vice Admiral, he was appointed as Commandant of Indian Naval Academy. After a short stint, he took over as the Controller of Personnel Services on 3 September 2024. On 1 August 2025, he moved to the Integrated Defence Staff headquarters as DCIDS (Policy Planning & Force Development) and later served as DCIDS (Doctrine, Organisation & Training).

On 1 June 2026, Vice Admiral McCarty took over as the Commander-in-Chief, Andaman and Nicobar Command succeeding Vice Admiral Ajay Kochhar who was elevated as the Vice Chief of Naval Staff.

== Awards and decorations ==
During his career, he has been awarded with the Ati Vishisht Seva Medal on 26 January 2024.

Ati Vishisht Seva Medal	Samanya Seva Medal	Special Service Medal	Operation Vijay Medal
Operation Parakram Medal	Sainya Seva Medal	Videsh Seva Medal	75th Independence Anniversary Medal
50th Independence Anniversary Medal	30 Years Long Service Medal	20 Years Long Service Medal	9 Years Long Service Medal

== See also ==
- Flag Officer Commanding Western Fleet
- Western Fleet

Military offices
Preceded by Sameer Saxena	Flag Officer Commanding Western Fleet; 2022 – 2023	Succeeded by C. R. Praveen Nair
Preceded by Puneet Kumar Bahl	Commandant of Indian Naval Academy; 2024 - 2024	Succeeded by C. R. Praveen Nair
Preceded by Gurcharan Singh	Controller of Personnel Services; 2024 - 2025	Succeeded by C. R. Praveen Nair
Preceded by Sanjay Vatsayan	Deputy Chief of the Integrated Defence Staff (Perspective Planning & Force Development); 2025 - 2026	Succeeded by Praveen Keshav Vohra
Preceded by Zubin A. Minwalla	Deputy Chief of the Integrated Defence Staff (Doctrine, Organisation & Training); 2026 - 2026	Succeeded by Rajesh Dhankhar
Preceded by Ajay Kochhar	Commander-in-Chief, Andaman and Nicobar Command; 1 June 2026 - Present	Incumbent
