= Gurcharan Singh (admiral) =

Indian Navy Admiral

Vice Admiral Gurcharan Singh AVSM, NM
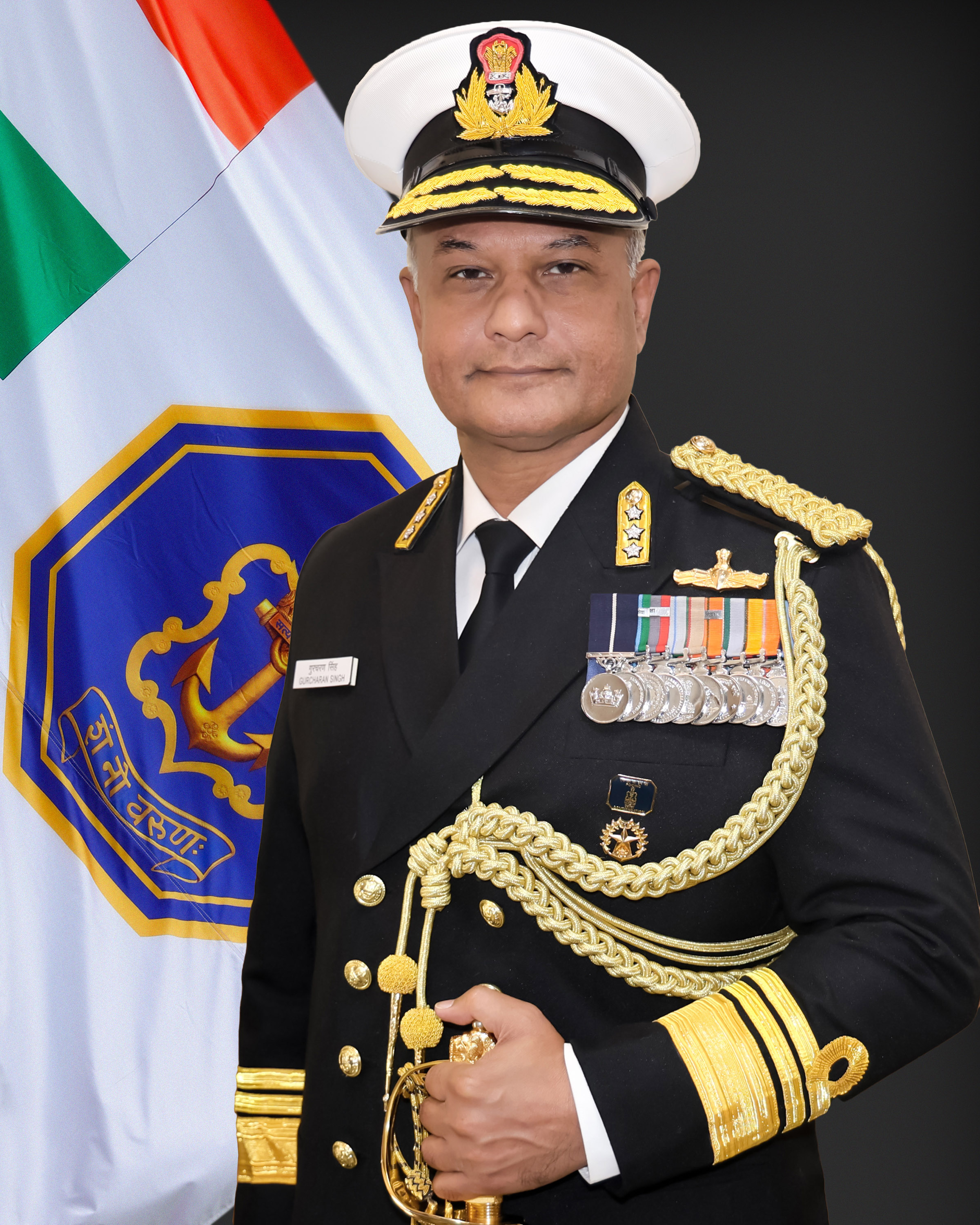
- Education: Indian Naval Academy
- Military career
- Allegiance: India
- Branch: Indian Navy
- Service years: July 1990 - present
- Rank: Vice Admiral
- Commands: Eastern Fleet; INS Kochi (D64); INS Khukri (P49); INS Vidyut (K48)
- Awards: Ati Vishisht Seva Medal; Nao Sena Medal

Vice Admiral Gurcharan Singh, AVSM, NM is a serving Flag officer in the Indian Navy. He currently serves as the Chief of Personnel at NHQ. He earlier served as the Commandant of the National Defence Academy and as the Flag Officer Commanding Eastern Fleet.

== Early life and education ==
Singh was born in a naval family. His father was a gunnery officer and was posted at INS Venduruthy and subsequently at the gunnery school INS Dronacharya. Singh spent his childhood in Kochi and attended the Kendriya Vidyalaya Naval Base Kochi. After his schooling, he joined the National Defence Academy, Pune.

Singh has attended the Defence Services Staff College, Wellington, the Naval War College, Goa and the National Defence College. he has also attended the Maritime Intelligence Course at National Intelligence University (NIU), Washington, D.C. and the United Nations Staff Officers Course (UNSOC) at Stockholm, Sweden.

== Naval career ==
Singh was commissioned into the Indian Navy on 1 July 1990. He is a specialist in Gunnery and missile Warfare. During his ab-initio training, he placed first in the overall order of merit and was awarded the Admiral RD Katari Trophy. He has served in specialist tenures on board the Rajput-class destroyer INS Ranjit (D53) and the Veer-class corvette INS Prahar (K98). He was the commissioning gunnery officer of the lead ship of her class of guided missile frigates INS Brahmaputra (1994). He was also the commissioning executive officer of the lead ship of her class of stealth guided missile frigates INS Shivalik (F47).

Singh has commanded the Veer-class missile vessel INS Vidyut (K48), and the lead ship of her class of missile corvettes INS Khukri (P49). During his command of the Khukri, in December 2011, the ship was awarded the Unit Citation for successful conduct of anti-piracy operations. He subsequently commissioned the Kolkata-class stealth guided-missile destroyer INS Kochi (D64) as the commanding officer. He thus has the distinction of being part of the commissioning crew of three ships - Brahmaputra, Shivalik and Kochi.

Singh, in his staff appointments, has served as the training coordinator at the gunnery base INS Dronacharya. He also served as the Director of Naval Intelligence at Naval headquarters. As a Commodore, he served as the Chief Staff Officer and Commodore Work Up at Indian Naval Workup Team Kochi (INWT), under the Flag Officer Sea Training (FOST). For his tenure at INWT, on 26 January 2020, he was awarded the Nao Sena Medal for devotion to duty. He subsequently served as the Deputy Commandant of his alma mater, Naval War College, Goa.

=== Flag rank ===
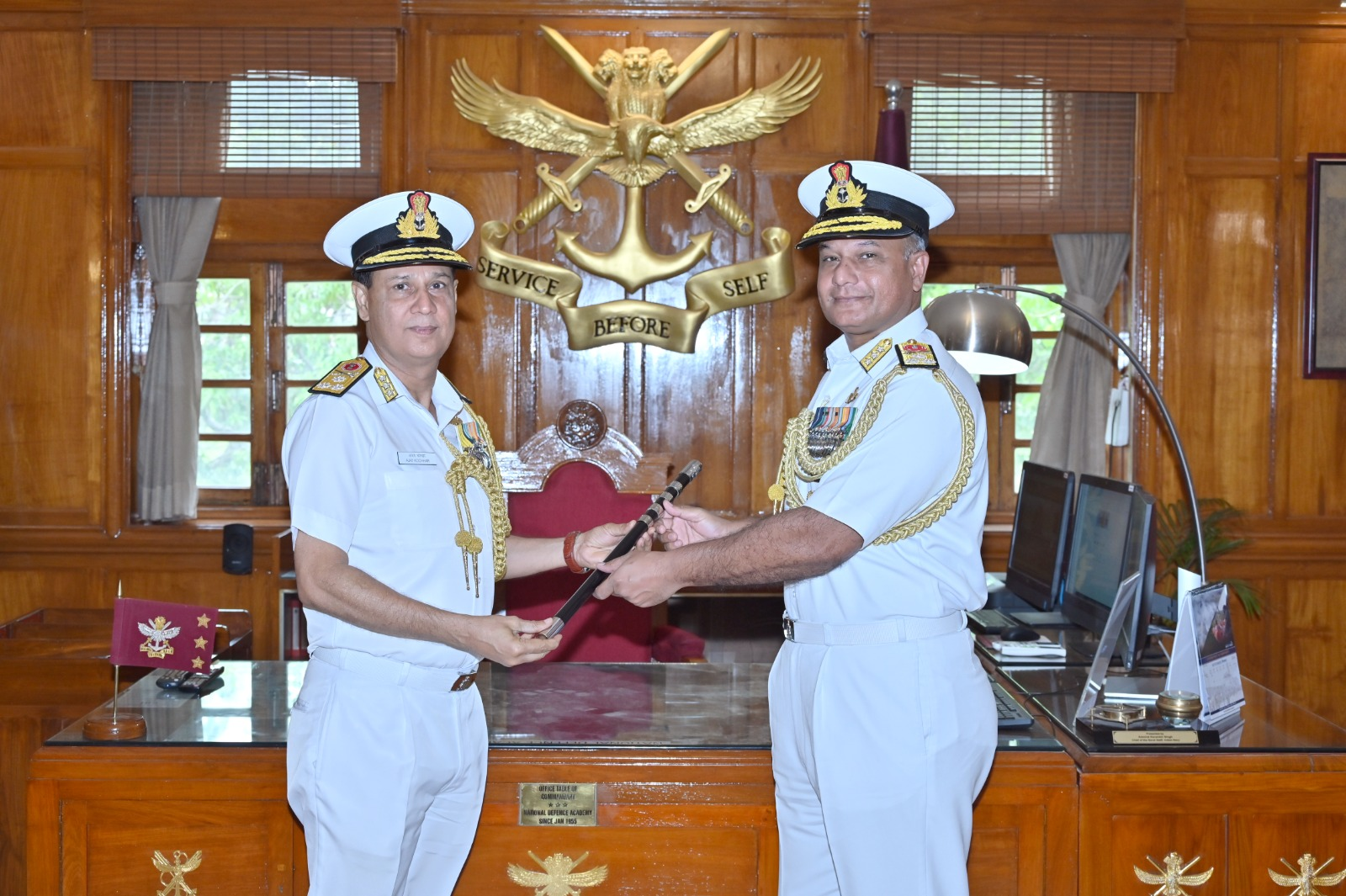
VAdm Gurcharan Singh (right) taking over from VAdm Ajay Kochhar as Commandant NDA.

On promotion to Flag rank, Singh took over as the Chief Staff Officer (Operations) (CSO Ops) at the Western Naval Command. As CSO (Ops), he planned and executed the search and rescue operations during Cyclone Tauktae. He also planned the Operation Samudra Setu II, where warships were deployed for shipment of liquid medical oxygen and medical equipment from various countries.

He also served as the Assistant Chief of Personnel (Human Resource Development) (ACOP HRD) at naval headquarters. ACOP is an assistant principal staff officer appointment. On 29 November 2022, he assumed the office of the Flag Officer Commanding Eastern Fleet (FOCEF), taking over from Rear Admiral Sanjay Bhalla. After a year-long tenure, he relinquished charge to Rear Admiral Rajesh Dhankhar. For his tenure as FOCEF, he was awarded the Ati Vishisht Seva Medal on 26 January 2024. In the same month, he was promoted to the rank of Vice Admiral and appointed Controller of Personnel Services at NHQ. After a short stint as CPS, he was appointed Commandant of the National Defence Academy. He took over from Vice Admiral Ajay Kochhar on 25 May 2024. In November 2025, he moved to naval headquarters, as the Chief of Personnel, a Principal Staff Officer (PSO) appointment.

== Personal life ==
Singh is married to Kamaljit Chatha. The couple has two daughters, Anushka and Tammanna.

== Awards and decorations ==
Singh was awarded the FOC-in-C commendation in 2002, the Nao Sena Medal in 2020 and the Ati Vishisht Seva Medal in 2024.

Ati Vishisht Seva Medal	Nao Sena Medal	Samanya Seva Medal	Special Service Medal
Operation Vijay Medal	Operation Parakram Medal	Sainya Seva Medal	75th Anniversary of Independence Medal
50th Anniversary of Independence Medal	30 Years Long Service Medal	20 Years Long Service Medal	9 Years Long Service Medal

== See also ==
- Flag Officer Commanding Eastern Fleet
- Eastern Fleet

Military offices
Preceded by Ashok Rai	Deputy Commandant, Naval War College, Goa; 2019 - 2021	Succeeded by Nitin Kapoor
Preceded by Sanjay Bhalla	Flag Officer Commanding Eastern Fleet; 2022 - 2023	Succeeded by Rajesh Dhankhar
Preceded by Krishna Swaminathan	Controller of Personnel Services; 2024 - 2024	Succeeded by Vineet McCarty
Preceded by Ajay Kochhar	Commandant of the National Defence Academy; 2024 - 2025	Succeeded by Anil Jaggi
Preceded by Sanjay Bhalla	Chief of Personnel; 2025 - Present	Incumbent
