= Saju Balakrishnan =

Air Officer Commanding-in-Chief, India

Air Marshal Saju Balakrishnan PVSM AVSM VM
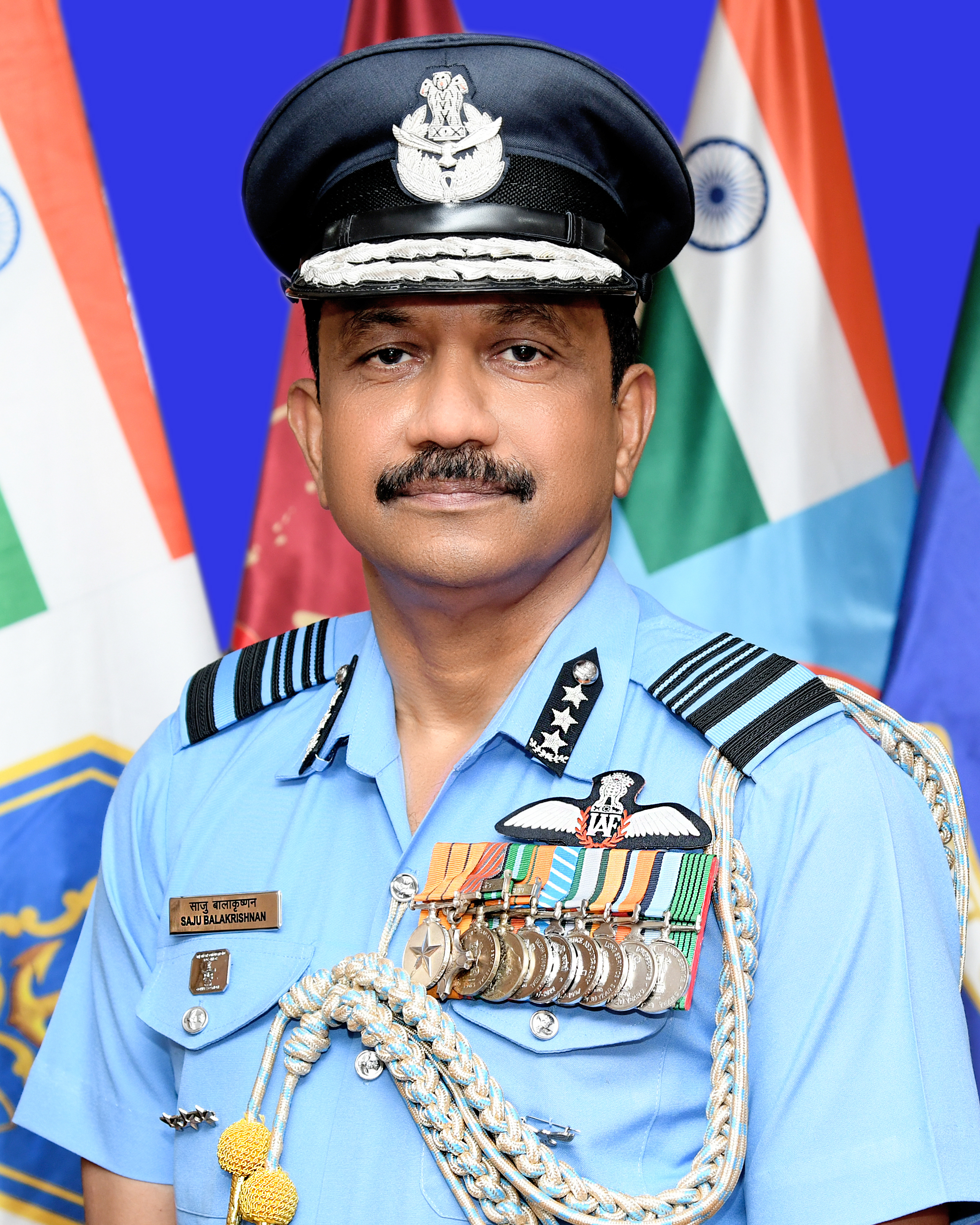

Personal details
- Education: Air Force Academy
- Awards: Param Vishisht Seva Medal; Ati Vishisht Seva Medal; Vayu Sena Medal

Military service
- Allegiance: India
- Branch/service: Indian Air Force
- Years of service: 7 June 1986 – 31 May 2025
- Rank: Air Marshal
- Unit: No.32 Squadron; No. 50 Squadron
- Commands: Andaman and Nicobar Command
- Service number: 18300

Air Marshal Saju Balakrishnan, PVSM, AVSM, VM is a retired officer of the Indian Air Force. He is served as the 17th Commander-in-Chief, Andaman and Nicobar Command (CINCAN). He assumed the office on 1 May 2023 succeeding Lieutenant General Ajai Singh, till 31 May 2025.

== Early life and education ==
Saju Balakrishnan is an alumnus of Sanik School, Kazhakootam and National Defence Academy, Pune. He has done the staff course from Royal College of Defence Studies, United Kingdom.

== Career ==
Saju Balakrishnan was commissioned as a fighter pilot in the Indian Air Force in June 1986. In a career spanning over 37 years, he has as more than 3,200 hours of flying experience across various variants of MiG-21 and Kiran aircraft.

He is an accomplished fighter combat leader and experimental test pilot. He served as the Commanding officer of No. 32 Squadron sporting the MiG-21 Bison and was the first commanding officer of the No. 50 Squadron featuring AWACS aircraft.

As Air Commodore, he served as the Air Officer Commanding of 32 Wing at the Jodhpur sector in the South Western Air Command. Later, he did the staff course from Royal College of Defence Studies, United Kingdom.

As Air Vice Marshal, he served as the Assistant Chief of Integrated Defense Staff, ACIDS (Pers Plans & Force). Later, he served as the Assistant Chief of Air Staff, Air Defence, New Delhi.

After his promotion to Air Marshal on 8 March 2022, he served as the Senior Air Staff Officer, Training Command till 30 April 2023.

He took over as the Commander-in-Chief, Andaman and Nicobar Command on 1 May 2023 from Lieutenant General Ajai Singh. He is the first Indian Air Force Air Marshal in a decade to head the CINAC.

He superannuated on 31 May 2025 after 39 years of service to the nation.

== Honours and decorations ==
During his career, Saju Balakrishnan has been awarded the Param Vishisht Seva Medal in 2025, Ati Vishisht Seva Medal in 2021 and Vayu Sena Medal in 2012 for his service.

Param Vishisht Seva Medal	Ati Vishisht Seva Medal	Vayu Sena Medal	Samanya Seva Medal
Sainya Seva Medal	High Altitude Service Medal	75th Anniversary of Independence Medal	50th Anniversary of Independence Medal
30 Years Long Service Medal	20 Years Long Service Medal	9 Years Long Service Medal	

Military offices
Preceded by Ajai Singh	Commander-in-Chief, Andaman and Nicobar Command; 1 May 2023 – 31 May 2025	Succeeded by Dinesh Singh Rana
Preceded by B Chandra Sekhar	Senior Air Staff Officer – Training Command; 8 March 2022 – 30 April 2023	Succeeded by Surendra Kumar Indoria
