= C. R. Praveen Nair =

Indian Navy admiral

Vice Admiral C. R. Praveen Nair AVSM, NM
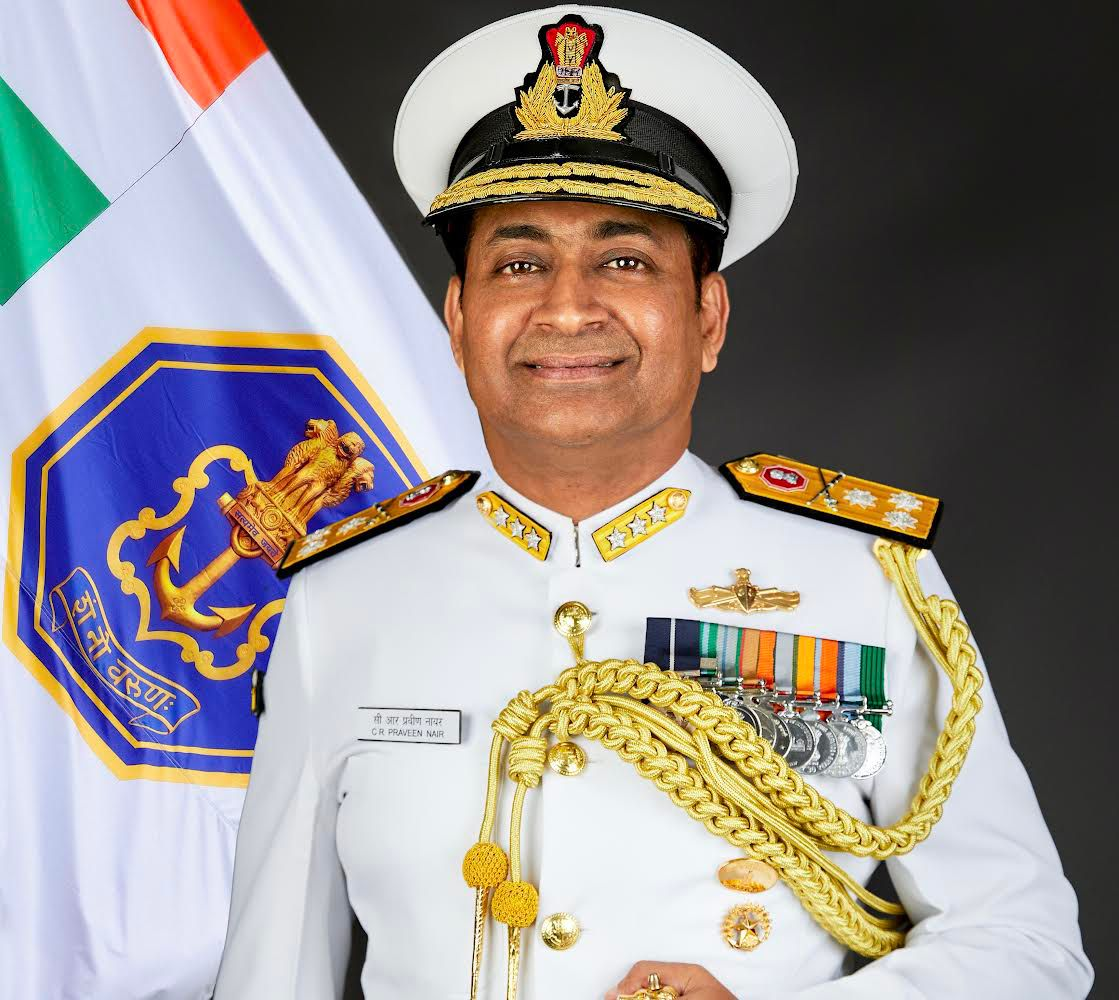
- Education: Indian Naval Academy
- Military career
- Allegiance: India
- Branch: Indian Navy
- Service years: 1 July 1991 – present
- Rank: Vice admiral
- Commands: Indian Naval Academy; Western Fleet; INS Vikramaditya (R33); INS Chennai (D65); INS Kirch (P62)
- Awards: Ati Vishisht Seva Medal; Nao Sena Medal

Vice Admiral Chempakvilas Rammohan Praveen Nair, AVSM, NM is a serving flag officer in the Indian Navy. He currently serves as the controller of personnel services (CPS) at Naval Headquarters. He previously served as the commandant of Indian Naval Academy, and as the flag officer commanding Western Fleet. He earlier commanded the aircraft carrier INS Vikramaditya (R33) and was the commissioning commanding officer of the guided missile destroyer INS Chennai (D65).

== Naval career ==
Nair attended the Naval Academy, Goa and was commissioned into the Indian Navy on 1 July 1991. He later specialized in Communication and Electronic Warfare. He has served on board the training ship INS Krishna (F46) and served as the communications and electronic warfare officer of the Kora-class corvette INS Kora (P61).

Nair commanded the Kora-class corvette INS Kirch (P62). He attended the Defence Services Staff College, Wellington. He then served in the Talwar-class Training Team. He was the communications and electronic warfare officer of the Delhi-class guided missile destroyer INS Mysore (D60). He later served as the Fleet Electronic Warfare Officer and the Fleet Communication Officer of the Western Fleet.

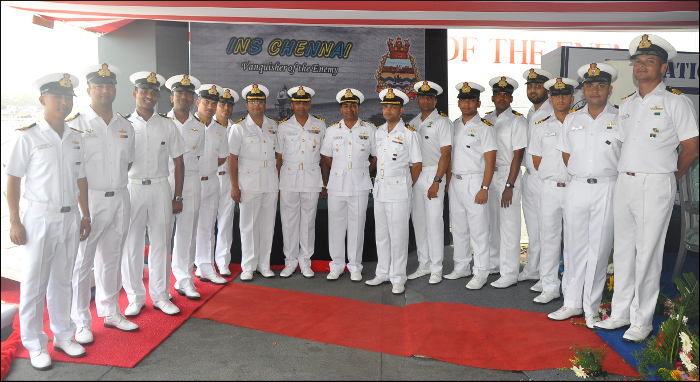
Nair with his officers on board INS Chennai.

Nair attended the Naval War College in Newport, Rhode Island. He served as the directing staff at Naval War College, Goa and as the Officer-in-Charge Signal School in Kochi. In 2016, he was appointed the commissioning commanding officer of the third and last ship of the Kolkata-class Stealth guided missile destroyer INS Chennai (D65). As the CO, he commissioned the ship on 21 November 2016 in Mumbai. In April 2017, the ship was dedicated to the city of Chennai, its namesake.

As a commodore, Nair served as the fleet operations officer (FOO) of the Eastern Fleet. For his tenure as FOO, he was awarded the Nao Sena Medal for devotion to duty on 26 January 2020. He also served as the commodore (personnel) in the Personnel directorate at naval headquarters. In 2020, he took over as the sixth commanding officer of the flag ship of the Navy, the aircraft carrier INS Vikramaditya (R33). He has been a member of the Navy’ s premier Think-Tank, the Indian Naval Strategic and Operational Council (INSOC) for over three years.

=== Flag rank ===
Nair was promoted to flag rank in 2022 and was appointed Assistant Chief of Naval Staff (Policy & Plans) (ACNS P&P) at naval headquarters. He took over as the flag officer commanding Western Fleet on 10 November 2023 from Rear Admiral Vineet McCarty. He led the Western Fleet during Operation Sankalp. After a nine-month tenure as FOCWF, he was promoted to the rank of vice admiral and appointed commandant of Indian Naval Academy, Ezhimala. He took over as commandant on 29 August 2024. On 26 January 2025, he was awarded the Ati Vishisht Seva Medal. After close to a year as commandant, INA, Nair moved to NHQ and took over as the controller of personnel services (CPS) on 31 July 2025.

== Awards and decorations ==
Nair was awarded the Nao Sena Medal (Devotion to duty) in 2020 and the Ati Vishisht Seva Medal in 2025.

Ati Vishist Seva Medal	Nao Sena Medal	Samanya Seva Medal	Operation Vijay Medal
Operation Parakram Medal	Sainya Seva Medal	75th Independence Anniversary Medal	50th Independence Anniversary Medal
30 Years Long Service Medal	20 Years Long Service Medal		9 Years Long Service Medal

== See also ==
- Flag Officer Commanding Western Fleet
- Western Fleet

Military offices
Preceded by Rajesh Dhankhar	Commanding officer INS Vikramaditya; 2020 – 2021	Succeeded by Susheel Menon
Preceded by Vineet McCarty	Flag Officer Commanding Western Fleet; 2023 – 2024	Succeeded by Rahul Vilas Gokhale
Preceded by Vineet McCarty	Commandant of Indian Naval Academy; 2024 – 2025	Succeeded by Manish Chadha
Preceded by Vineet McCarty	Controller of Personnel Services; 2025 - Present	Incumbent
