= Commander-in-Chief, Andaman and Nicobar Command =

Indian military appointment

Commander-in-Chief, Andaman and Nicobar Command (CINCAN)
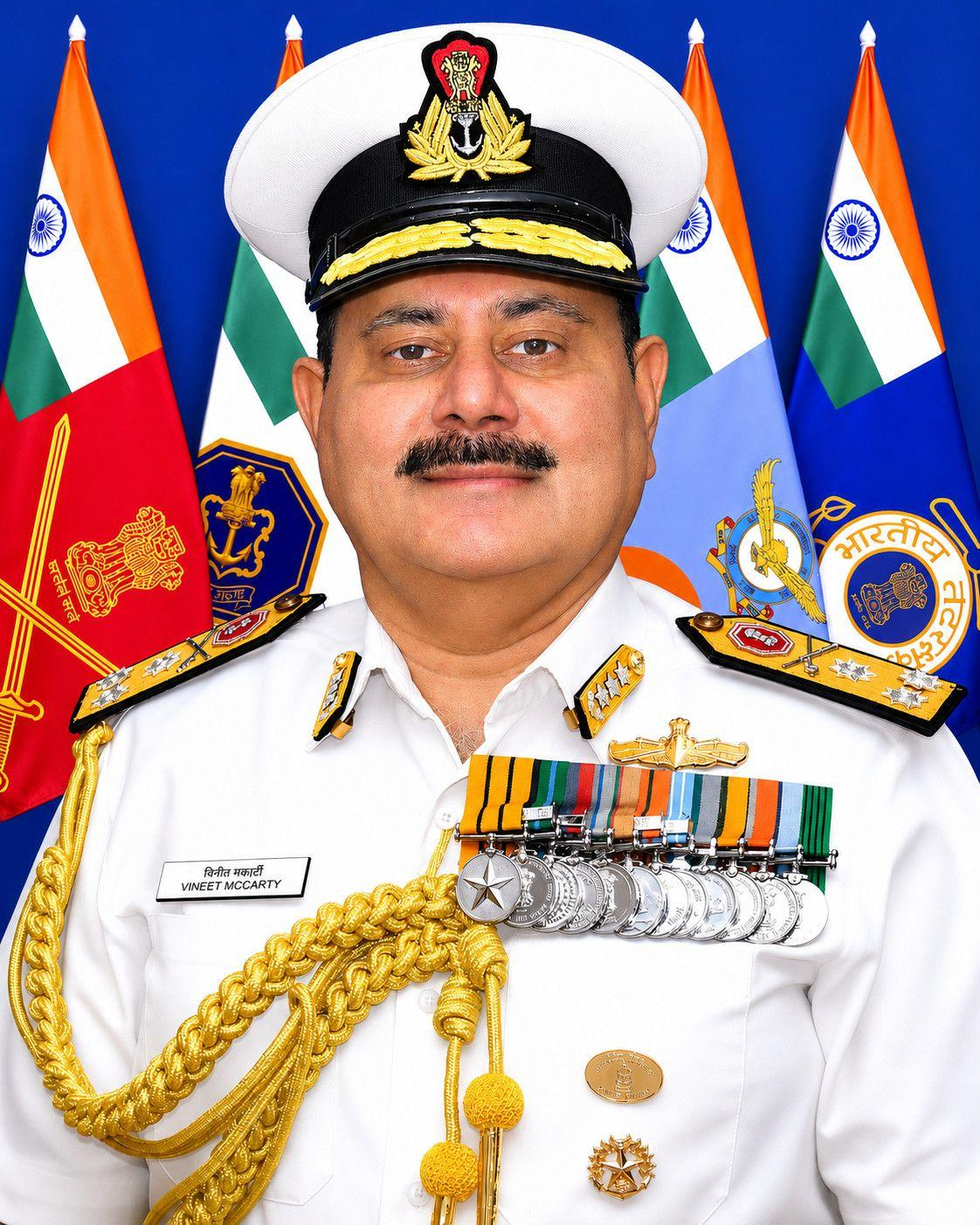
- Abbreviation: CINCAN
- Reports to: Chief of the Defence Staff
- Seat: Sri Vijaya Puram, Andaman and Nicobar Islands
- Appointer: Appointments Committee of the Cabinet
- Precursor: Fortress Commander, Andaman and Nicobar Islands (FORTAN)
- Formation: 2001
- First holder: Vice Admiral Arun Prakash; AVSM VrC VSM ADC
- Deputy: Chief of Staff
- Website: Official Website

The Commander-in-Chief, Andaman and Nicobar Command (CINCAN) is the head of the Andaman and Nicobar Command, the first and only Tri-service theater command of the Indian Armed Forces, based at Sri Vijaya Puram (formerly Port Blair) in the Andaman and Nicobar Islands, a Union Territory of India.

The current CINCAN is Vice Admiral Vineet McCarty who took command on 1 June 2026 as the 20th CINCAN.

== History ==
The Andaman and Nicobar Islands became a Union territory of India in 1956. The first military unit on the islands was the naval base INS Jarawa, which was commissioned in 1964. The base was commanded by a Resident Naval Officer (RNO). After establishing subsequent garrisons in the islands, the post was upgraded to Naval Officer-in-Charge Andaman & Nicobar (NOIC A&N). The naval establishments were under the command of the Eastern Naval Command during the Indo-Pakistani War of 1971. In October 1976, the operational control of all forces in the islands was given, and the post was upgraded to Commodore, Andaman & Nicobar (COMAN). Shortly afterwards, all establishments came under the newly created Fortress Andaman & Nicobar to signify jointness. The appointment was redesignated to Fortress Commander, Andaman and Nicobar Islands (FORTAN). In 1978, INS Kardip was commissioned as a Forward operating base.

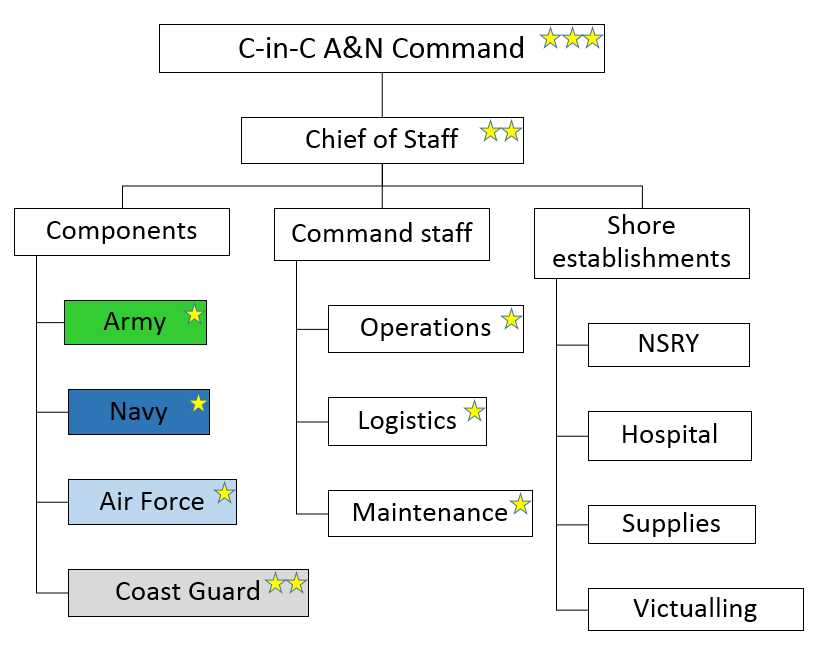
Structure of the Andaman and Nicobar Command

In March 1981, FORTAN was upgraded to a Two star appointment tenanted by a Rear Admiral. In 1987, the post was further upgraded to a three star appointment. In 1998, a 'Far East Naval Command' (FENC) was proposed, to be commanded by a Flag Officer Commanding-in-Chief, Far East Naval Command.

With the operationalisation of the A & N Command as a unified theatre command in October 2001, Vice Admiral Arun Prakash, AVSM, VrC, VSM, ADC took over as the First Commander-in-Chief of the unified command.

== Organisation ==
The CINCAN is a Three-star rank officer from the three Services in rotation. The CINCAN reports directly to the Chief of Defence Staff (India) (CDS) in New Delhi. He is assisted by the Chief of Staff of the command, a two-star officer and the commanders of each component (sea, land, air) - one-star officers.

== List of Commanders ==
The following is a list of Commanders-in-Chief of the A&N command.

No	Portrait	Name	Branch	Appointment Date	Left office	References
1		Vice Admiral Arun Prakash AVSM VrC VSM	Indian Navy	8 October 2001	30 December 2002	
2		Vice Admiral O. P. Bansal AVSM	Indian Navy	15 January 2003	30 September 2003	
3		Lieutenant General Bhupender Singh Thakur AVSM	Indian Army	1 October 2003	13 January 2005	
4		Lieutenant General Aditya Singh AVSM & bar	Indian Army	14 January 2005	27 February 2006	
5		Vice Admiral Arun Kumar Singh PVSM AVSM NM	Indian Navy	28 February 2006	25 October 2006	
6		Air Marshal Packiam Paul Rajkumar AVSM	Indian Air Force	2 December 2006	31 December 2007	
7		Air Marshal Sadasivan Radhakrishnan AVSM	Indian Air Force	1 January 2008	30 September 2008	
8		Vice Admiral Vijay Shankar AVSM	Indian Navy	30 September 2008	30 September 2009	
9		Vice Admiral Devendra Kumar Joshi AVSM YSM NM VSM	Indian Navy	30 September 2009	28 December 2010	
10		Lieutenant General N. C. Marwah AVSM	Indian Army	1 January 2011	31 October 2012	
11		Air Marshal Pramon Kumar Roy AVSM VM VSM	Indian Air Force	2 November 2012	30 June 2014	
12		Vice Admiral Pradeep Kumar Chatterjee AVSM NM	Indian Navy	1 July 2014	28 February 2016	
13		Vice Admiral Bimal Verma AVSM	Indian Navy	29 February 2016	1 December 2019	
14		Lieutenant General Podali Shankar Rajeshwar PVSM AVSM VSM	Indian Army	1 December 2019	31 May 2020	
15		Lieutenant General Manoj Pande AVSM VSM	Indian Army	1 June 2020	31 May 2021	
16		Lieutenant General Ajai Singh PVSM AVSM	Indian Army	1 June 2021	30 April 2023	
17		Air Marshal Saju Balakrishnan AVSM VM	Indian Air Force	1 May 2023	31 May 2025	
18		Lieutenant General Dinesh Singh Rana PVSM AVSM YSM SM	Indian Army	1 June 2025	30 September 2025	
19		Vice Admiral Ajay Kochhar PVSM AVSM NM	Indian Navy	1 October 2025	25 May 2026	
20		Vice Admiral Vineet McCarty AVSM	Indian Navy	1 June 2026	Present	

Number of CINCAN by branches of service
Branch	Count
Indian Army	7
Indian Navy	9
Indian Air Force	4

== See also ==
- Chairman of the Chiefs of Staff Committee
- Chief of Integrated Defence Staff
- Andaman and Nicobar Command

== Bibliography ==
- Singh, Anup (2018), Blue Waters Ahoy!, The Indian Navy 2001-2010, HarperCollins Publishers India, ISBN 978-93-5302-552-6
- Mukherjee, Anit; Mohan, C. Raja (2015), India's Naval Strategy and Asian Security, Routledge, ISBN 978-1-317-36133-6
