= Operation Neer =

Operation Neer (Hindi: "Water") was initiated by Indian government in response to the Maldivian government's request for help after major fire broke out at the Male Water and Sewerage Company (MWSC) generator control panel on 4 December 2014, causing extensive damage to the cabling of the generator to the Distillation plants and disconnection of water supply. The Maldives do not have standing fresh water, and is thus entirely dependent on desalination plants.

== Indian response ==
The Indian Navy diverted INS Sukanya, which was off the coast of Kochi, to Malé, the capital of the Maldives. She carried 35 tonnes of fresh water and has the capability to produce 20 tonnes of water every day. On 7 December, the INS Deepak, a large fleet tanker, reached Male carrying 1000 tonnes of water. The Indian Air Force also provided five aircraft including two C-17 Globemaster-III and three IL-76 with 153 tonnes of water on 5 December, and again on 6 December, provided three aircraft with 130 tonnes on 6 December. One C-17 aircraft with 40 tonnes and another aircraft with about 40 tonnes have also reached Male' on 7 December.

=== International cooperation ===
After an appeal for aid from India, Sri Lanka, the United States, and China responded with aid programs of their own; India launched Operation Neer and was the first country to respond directly.
