= List of historical ships of the Indian Navy =

This is a list of ships of the Indian Navy. It covers both the pre-independence era when India was a british colony and ships were designated as HMIS / Royal Indian Navy and in the post-independence republic era as Indian Navy with designation of INS.

== Historical ships ==
Note: Prior to 1950, Indian naval ships carried the prefix HMIS ("His Majesty's Indian Ship") as the Indian Armed Forces were under the British Crown. After the declaration of the Republic of India on 26 January 1950, the prefix became INS ("Indian Naval Ship").

=== Aircraft carriers ===
Ship	Pennant	Class	Commissioned	Decommissioned	Fate	Notes
INS Vikrant	R11	Majestic-class	4 March 1961	31 January 1990	Converted to IMS-Indian Museum Ship briefly but subsequently scrapped in 2014.	Formerly HMS Hercules although never commissioned into the Royal Navy.
INS Viraat	R22	Centaur-class	12 May 1987	6 March 2017	Dismantled on 19 September 2020	Formerly HMS Hermes.

=== Submarines ===
Boat	Pennant	Class	Commissioned	Decommissioned	Fate	Notes
Nuclear Submarines
INS Chakra	S71	Charlie class	1 September 1987	Returned to Soviet Union in January 1991	Scrapped in Russia.	Leased from the Soviet Union.
INS Chakra	S71	Akula class	4 April 2012	Returned to Russia June 2021		Returned to Russia before 10-year lease completed, due to extensive damage suffered in service.
Conventional Submarines
INS Khanderi	S22	Kalvari class	6 December 1968	18 October 1989	Scrapped but sail fin on display	
INS Kalvari	S23	Kalvari class	8 December 1967	31 May 1996	Scrapped but sail fin on display	
INS Kursura	S20	Kalvari class	18 December 1969	27 September 2001	Converted to Museum Ship at Ramakrishna Mission Beach, Visakhapatnam.	
INS Karanj	S21	Kalvari class	4 September 1969	1 August 2003		
INS Vagsheer	S43	Vela class	26 December 1974	30 April 1997		
INS Vagir	S41	Vela class	3 November 1973	7 June 2001		
INS Vela	S40	Vela class	31 August 1973	25 June 2010		
INS Vagli	S42	Vela class	10 August 1974	9 December 2010	To be preserved as a museum in Tamil Nadu.	
INS Sindhurakshak	S63	Sindhughosh class	24 December 1997	6 March 2017	Sunk	Exploded and sank on 14 August 2013. After being salvaged in June 2014, she was decommissioned in March 2017 and disposed of at sea that June.
INS Sindhuvir	S58	Sindhughosh class	26 August 1988	March 2020	Transferred to Myanmar Navy	
INS Sindhudhvaj	S56	Sindhughosh class	12 June 1987	16 July 2022	Decommissioned	
INS Sindhughosh	S55	Sindhughosh class	30 April 1986	19 December 2025	Decommissioned	

=== Cruisers ===
Ship	Pennant	Class	Commissioned	Decommissioned	Fate	Notes
Cruisers
INS Delhi; Originally commissioned as HMIS (His Majesty's Indian Ship) Delhi	C74	Leander class	5 July 1948	30 June 1978	Scrapped	Purchased from the U.K. Formerly HMS Achilles of the Battle of the River Plate fame. Turrets on Display at Devonport Naval Base, Auckland, New Zealand, and at Indian Military Academy, Dehradun, India.
INS Mysore	C60	Fiji class	29 August 1957	20 August 1985	Scrapped	Purchased from the U.K. Formerly HMS Nigeria.

=== Destroyers ===
Ship	Pennant	Class	Commissioned	Decommissioned	Fate	Notes
Destroyers
INS Rajput (ex-Nadezhny)	D51	Rajput-class destroyer	4 May 1980	21 May 2021		Built in the Soviet Union as Nadezhny, but never commissioned into the Soviet Navy.
INS Ranjit (ex-Lovkiyy)	D53	Rajput-class destroyer	24 November 1983	6 May 2019	Sunk during TROPEX-21 as a live target.	Built in the Soviet Union as Lovkiyy, but never commissioned into the Soviet Navy.
INS Rajput	D141	R class	28 July 1949	30 June 1973	scrapped 1979	Served as HMS Rotherham in the Royal Navy before being transferred to India.
INS Ranjit	D209	R class	4 July 1949	30 September 1975	scrapped 1979	Served as HMS Redoubt in the Royal Navy before being transferred to India.
INS Rana	D115	R class	9 September 1949	30 September 1971	scrapped 1979	Served as HMS Raider in the Royal Navy before being transferred to India.
INS Godavari	D92	Hunt class	27 April 1953	31 Aug 1976	scrapped 1979	leased and then purchased from the Royal Navy. Formerly HMS Bedale. Was operated by Polish Navy during World War II as ORP Ślązak.
INS Gomati	D93	Hunt class	24 April 1953	31 May 1972	scrapped 1975	leased and then purchased from the Royal Navy. Formerly HMS Lamerton.
INS Ganga	D94	Hunt class	18 June 1953	31 July 1972	scrapped 1975	leased and then purchased from the Royal Navy. Formerly HMS Chiddingfold.

=== Frigates ===
Ship	Pennant	Class	Commissioned	Decommissioned	Fate	Notes
Frigates
HMIS Tamar	K262	River class	1946	Dec 1946	Constructive Total Loss after running aground off Hainan Island	was previously HMS Aire prior to Indian service.
HMIS Neza	K239	River class	1946	1947	Returned to the Royal Navy in April 1947. Scrapped 1955.	Served as HMS Test in the Royal Navy before transfer to India.
HMIS Shamsher	K392	River class	1945	1947	Transferred to Pakistan and served as PNS Shamsher. Scrapped 1959.	Served as HMS Nadder in the Royal Navy before transfer to India.
HMIS Dhanush	K265	River class	1945	1948	Transferred to Pakistan and served as PNS Dhanush.	Served as HMS Deveron in the Royal Navy before transfer to India.
HMIS Kukri renamed INS Kukri post republic.	K243	River class	1946	1951	Converted to survey vessel post republic. Recommissioned as INS Investigator	Served as HMS Trent in the Royal Navy before being transferred to India.
HMIS Hooghly renamed INS Hooghly post republic.	K330	River class	Purchased 1948	1950	scrapped	Served as HMCS Waskesiu for the Royal Canadian Navy during World War II. Converted to a pilot vessel in Indian service, scrapped 1965.
HMIS Tir renamed INS Tir post republic.	K256	River class	3 December 1945	30 September 1977	scrapped	Served as HMS Bann in the Royal Navy during World War II. Served as training ship in the Indian Navy.
INS Khukri	F149	Blackwood Class	16 July 1958		Sunk in action on 9 December 1971 during Indo-Pakistani War of 1971.	
INS Kirpan	F144	Blackwood Class	July 1959	1978	Transferred to Coast Guard Service 1978.	
INS Kuthar	F146	Blackwood Class	November 1959	18 Aug 1978	Transferred to Coast Guard Service 1978.	
INS Talwar	F140	Whitby class	26 April 1959	30 Oct 1985	Broken up for scrap 1992	
INS Trishul	F143	Whitby class	13 January 1960	31 Aug 1992	Broken up for scrap 1996	
INS Brahmaputra	F31	Leopard class	31 March 1958	30 Jun 1986	Ordered HMS Panther, but transferred to India. Broken Up 1986	
INS Beas	F37	Leopard class	24 May 1960	22 Dec 1992	Broken Up 1992	
INS Betwa	F39	Leopard class	8 December 1960	31 December 1991	Broken Up 1988	
INS Nilgiri	F33	Nilgiri class	23 June 1972	31 May 1996	Sunk on 24 April 1997, by a Sea Eagle AShM fired from a Sea Harrier Frs Mk.51 of the Indian Navy.	
INS Himgiri	F34	Nilgiri class	23 November 1974	6 May 2005		
INS Udaygiri	F35	Nilgiri class	18 February 1976	24 August 2007		
INS Dunagiri	F36	Nilgiri class	5 May 1977	20 October 2010		
INS Vindhyagiri	F42	Nilgiri class	8 July 1981	14 Jun 2012	Collided with a merchant ship while in Mumbai harbour on 30 January 2011; sank after on-board fire. No casualties. Re-floated and decommissioned with full honours in 2012.	
INS Taragiri	F41	Nilgiri class	16 May 1980	27 June 2013		
INS Krishna	F46	Leander class	22 August 1995	24 May 2012	Sunk as target, 2012.	Purchased as a cadet training ship from the Royal Navy. Was previously HMS Andromeda.
INS Godavari	F20	Godavari class	10 December 1983	23 December 2015	Sunk as target, October 2020.	
INS Ganga	F22	Godavari class	30 December 1985	22 March 2018		
INS Gomati	F21	Godavari class	16 April 1988	15 May 2022		
Sloops (later reclassified as frigates)
HMIS Elphinstone		Anchusa class	May 1922		wrecked on Nicobar Islands 29 January 1925.	
HMIS Baluchi	PC.55	P Class	May 1922	1935	Sold for scrapping	
HMIS Pathan	PC.69; K26	P Class	5 August 1921		sunk by Italian submarine Galvani on 23 June 1940.	
HMIS Indus	U67	Grimsby class	15 March 1935		Sunk by Japanese aircraft during Burma Campaign, 6 April 1942	
HMIS Cornwallis	L09; U09 (1940)	Aubrietia Class	1921	1946	scrapped	
HMIS Lawrence	L83; U83 (1940)	Unique Patrol Sloop	27 December 1919	1947	scrapped	
HMIS Clive	L79; U79 (1940)	Unique Patrol Sloop	20 April 1920	1947	scrapped	
HMIS Narbada	U40	Black Swan class	29 April 1943	1948	Transferred to Pakistan post-partition and served as PNS Jhelum	
HMIS Godavari	U52	Black Swan class	28 June 1943	1948	Transferred to Pakistan post-partition and served as PNS Sind.	Sunk the German submarine U-198 while in Indian service during World War II.
HMIS Hindustan	L80	Hastings class	10 October 1930	1948	Transferred to Pakistan post-partition and served as PNS Karsaz until 1960.	Was involved in the Royal Indian Navy mutiny.
HMIS Cauvery renamed INS Kaveri post republic.	U10	Black Swan class	26 August 1943	30 Sep 1977	scrapped	
HMIS Sutlej renamed INS Sutlej post republic.	U95	Black Swan class	23 April 1941	1 Dec 1978	scrapped	
HMIS Jumna renamed INS Jamuna post republic.	U21	Black Swan class	13 May 1941	31 Dec 1980	scrapped	Helped sink the Ro-110 in 1944 while in Indian service.
HMIS Kistna renamed INS Krisna post republic.	U46	Black Swan class	26 August 1943	31 Dec 1981	scrapped	

=== Corvette ===
Ship	Pennant	Class	Commissioned	Decommissioned	Fate	Notes
Corvettes
HMIS Gondwana	K348	Flower class	15 May 1945	1946	returned to Royal Navy and sold to the Thai Navy as HTMS Bangpakong	
HMIS Sind	K274	Flower class	24 August 1945	1946	returned to Royal Navy and sold to the Thai Navy as HTMS Prasae	
HMIS Mahratta	K395	Flower class	1946		Constructive total loss after running aground in 1947.	
HMIS Assam	K306	Flower class	19 February 1945	1947	returned to Royal Navy and scrapped	
HMIS Punjab	J239	Bathurst class	20 March 1942	1949	Transferred to Pakistan post-partition	
HMIS Bombay renamed INS Bombay post republic.	J249	Bathurst class	24 April 1942	1960	scrapped	Was involved in defence during the attack on Sydney Harbour
HMIS Bengal renamed INS Bengal post republic.	J243	Bathurst class	8 August 1942	1960	scrapped	Sank the Imperial Japanese Navy commerce raider Hōkoku Maru in 1942 while in Indian service.
HMIS Madras renamed INS Madras post republic.	J237	Bathurst class	12 May 1942	1960	scrapped	
INS Arnala	P68	Arnala class	29 June 1972	9 April 1999		
INS Androth	P69	Arnala class	30 June 1972	9 April 1999		
INS Anjadip	P73	Arnala class	23 December 1972	13 December 2003		
INS Andaman	P74	Arnala class	28 December 1973		Lost in a storm 22 August 1990	
INS Amini	P75	Arnala class	12 December 1974	16 September 2002		
INS Kamorta	P77	Arnala class	21 November 1968	31 October 1991		
INS Kadmatt	P78	Arnala class	23 December 1968	30 November 1992		
INS Kiltan	P79	Arnala class	30 October 1969	30 June 1987		Participated in Operation Trident (1971).
INS Kavaratti	P80	Arnala class	23 December 1969	31 July 1986		Participated in Operation Trident (1971).
INS Katchall	P81	Arnala class	23 December 1969	31 December 1988		
INS Amindivi	P83	Arnala class		1986–88		
INS Hosdurg	K73	Durg class	15 January 1978	5 June 1999	Sunk in a Sea Eagle AShM test in June 2000.	
INS Vijaydurg	K71	Durg class	25 December 1976	30 September 2002		
INS Sindhudurg	K72	Durg class	29 May 1977	24 September 2004		
INS Prahar	K98	Veer Class	1 March 1997		Sunk in collision on 22 April 2006	
INS Veer	K40	Veer Class	26 March 1987	28 April 2016		
INS Nipat	K42	Veer Class	5 December 1988	28 April 2016		
INS Khukri	P49	Khukri Class	23 August 1989	23 December 2021	Preserved as museum in Diu, India	
INS Kirpan	P44	Khukri Class	16 August 1988	22 July 2023	Donated to Vietnam People's Navy	
INS Agray	P36	Abhay-class	30 January 1991	27 January 2017		
INS Akshay	P35	Abhay-class	10 December 1990	3 June 2022		
INS Ajay	P34	Abhay-class	24 January 1990	19 September 2022		
INS Abhay	P33	Abhay-class	10 March 1989	6 October 2025		
Anti-Submarine Naval Trawler
HMIS Agra	T254	Basset class				
HMIS Ahmedabad	T264	Basset class				
HMIS Amritsar	T261	Basset class				
HMIS Baroda	T249	Basset class		1948	Transferred to Pakistan	
HMIS Berar	T256	Basset class				
HMIS Calcutta	T339	Basset class				
HMIS Cochin	T315	Basset class				
HMIS Cuttack	T251	Basset class				
HMIS Karachi	T262	Basset class				
HMIS Lahore	T253	Basset class				
HMIS Lucknow	T267	Basset class				
HMIS Madura	T268	Basset class				
HMIS Multan	T322	Basset class				
HMIS Nagpur	T269	Basset class				
HMIS Nasik	T258	Basset class				
HMIS Patna	T255	Basset class				
HMIS Peshawar	T263	Basset class				
HMIS Poona	T260	Basset class				
HMIS Quetta	T332	Basset class				
HMIS Rampur	T212	Basset class		1948	Transferred to Pakistan	
HMIS Shillong	T250	Basset class				
HMIS Travancore	T312	Basset class				

=== Minesweepers ===
Ship	Pennant	Class	Commissioned	Decommissioned	Fate	Notes
Ocean Going Minesweeper
HMIS Oostcapelle		unique ship	before 1939	before 1947		
HMIS Irawadi		unique ship	before 1939	before 1947		
HMIS Kathiawar	J155	Bangor Class	23 December 1942	1948	Transferred to Pakistan as PNS Chittagong.	
HMIS Baluchistan	J182	Bangor Class	28 October 1942	1948	Transferred to Pakistan as PNS Baluchistan.	
HMIS Oudh	J245	Bangor Class	21 October 1943	1948	Transferred to Pakistan as PNS Dacca.	
HMIS Malwa	J55	Bangor Class	1945	1948	Transferred to Pakistan as PNS Peshawar.	
HMIS Deccan	J129	Bangor Class	30 March 1945	1948	Sold in 1949 as the mercantile Kennery.	
HMIS Orissa	J200	Bangor Class	14 March 1942	1949	Scrapped	
HMIS Khyber	J190	Bangor Class	12 August 1942	1949	Scrapped	
HMIS Carnatic	J199	Bangor Class	27 October 1942	1949	Scrapped	
HMIS Kumaon	J164	Bangor Class	30 November 1942	1949	Scrapped	
HMIS Bihar	J247	Bangor Class	27 February 1944	1949	Scrapped	
HMIS Rajputana	J197	Bangor Class	30 April 1942	1961	Scrapped	
HMIS Konkan	J228	Bangor Class	12 June 1942	31 Jul 1972	Scrapped	
HMIS Rohilkhand	J180	Bangor Class	5 February 1943	1963	Scrapped	
INS Pondicherry	M61	Pondicherry class	2 February 1978	5 October 2007		
INS Porbandar	M62	Pondicherry class	19 December 1978	2007		
INS Bedi	M63	Pondicherry class	27 April 1979	22 September 2009		
INS Bhavnagar	M64	Pondicherry class	27 April 1979	26 December 2009		
INS Ratnagiri	M66	Pondicherry class	10 June 1980	22 May 2012		
INS Allepey	M65	Pondicherry class	10 June 1980	13 March 2015		
INS Karwar	M67	Pondicherry class	14 July 1986	9 May 2017		
INS Cannonare	M68	Pondicherry class	17 December 1987	23 March 2018		
INS Cuddalore	M69	Pondicherry class	29 October 1987	23 March 2018		
INS Kakinada	M70	Pondicherry class	23 December 1986	9 May 2017		
INS Konkan	M72	Pondicherry class	8 October 1988	23 March 2018		
INS Kozhikode	M71	Pondicherry class	19 December 1988	13 April 2019		Last ship of this class to be decommissioned.
Coastal Minesweeper
INS Cuddalore	M90	Ton class	1956	30 June 1979		ex-Royal Navy HMS Wennington
INS Cannanore	M91	Ton class	1956	31 Mar 1981		ex-Royal Navy HMS Whitton
INS Karwar	M92	Ton class	1956	31 Mar 1981		ex-Royal Navy HMS Overton
INS Kakinada	M93	Ton class	1956	30 June 1979		ex-Royal Navy HMS Durweston
INS Mulki	M87	Mahé Class	10 May 1984	16 May 2003		
INS Magdala	M88	Mahé Class	10 May 1984	31 Oct 2001		
INS Malvan	M84	Mahé Class	16 May 1983	3 Jan 2003		
INS Mangrol	M85	Mahé Class	16 May 1983	7 Apr 2004		
INS Mahé	M83	Mahé Class	16 May 1983	15 May 2006		
INS Malpe	M86	Mahé Class	10 May 1984	4 Dec 2006		
Inshore Minesweeper
INS Bassein	M2707	Ham class	14 June 1955	1994		ex-Royal Navy HMS Littleham
INS Bimlipatan	M2705	Ham class	14 June 1955	1994		ex-Royal Navy HMS Hildersham

=== Fast Attack Craft ===
Ship	Pennant	Class	Commissioned	Decommissioned	Fate	Notes
Missile Boat
INS Veer	K82	Vidyut Class	2 April 1971	31 December 1982		Sunk PNS Muhafiz during Operation Trident (1971).
INS Nirbhik	K88	Vidyut Class	20 February 1971	31 December 1986		
INS Nipat	K86	Vidyut Class	26 April 1971	29 February 1988		Destroyed the ammunition ship MV Venus Challenger, and the destroyer PNS Shah Jahan and the Karachi oil tanks during Operation Trident (1971).
INS Nirghat	K89	Vidyut Class	29 January 1971	31 July 1989		Sunk the PNS Khaibar during Operation Trident (1971).
INS Vinash	K85	Vidyut Class	20 January 1971	15 January 1990		Sunk the merchant MV Gulf Star, MV Harmattan, and badly damaged the Pakistani Fleet Tanker PNS Dacca, which was later scrapped, during Operation Python in 1971.
INS Nashak	K87	Vidyut Class	19 March 1971	31 December 1990		
INS Vidyut	K83	Vidyut Class	16 February 1971	31 March 1991		
INS Vijeta	K84	Vidyut Class	27 March 1971	30 June 1992		
INS Pratap	K92	Chamak Class	17 February 1976	17 May 1996		
INS Charag	K97	Chamak Class	17 October 1977	17 May 1996		
INS Prachand	K90	Chamak Class	17 February 1976	29 December 1999		
INS Prabal	K93	Chamak Class	17 February 1976	29 December 1999		
INS Pralaya	K91	Chamak Class	17 February 1976	8 June 2001		
INS Chapal	K94	Chamak Class	4 November 1976	5 May 2005	Preserved at Karwar, Karnataka	
INS Chamak	K95	Chamak Class	4 November 1976	5 May 2005		
INS Chatak	K96	Chamak Class	9 February 1977	5 May 2005		

=== Amphibious Warfare Ships ===
Ship	Pennant	Class	Commissioned	Decommissioned	Fate	Notes
Landing Ship Tank
INS Magar	L3011	Landing ship, tank	1949	31 March 1976		Former British tank landing ship HMS Avenger.Also took active part in 1971 Indo-Pakistan war Eastern Theater.
INS Magar	L20	Magar class	15 July 1987	6 May 2023		Participated in relief efforts for the 2004 Indian Ocean earthquake and tsunami.
Landing Ship Medium
INS Gharial	L12	Polnocny class	1966	30 Sep 1987		Originally L3022, Polish Built - Polnocny A
INS Guldar	L13	Polnocny class	1966	30 Dec 1985		Originally L3033, Polish Built - Polnocny A
INS Ghorpad	L14	Kumbhir class	21 December 1974	11 January 2008		Polish Built - Polnocny D
INS Kesari	L15	Kumbhir class	15 August 1975	8 May 1999		Polish Built - Polnocny D
INS Shardul	L16	Kumbhir class	24 December 1975	June 1997		Polish Built - Polnocny D
INS Sharabh	L17	Kumbhir class	27 January 1976	15 July 2011		Polish Built - Polnocny D
INS Cheetah	L18	Kumbhir class	February 1985	12 January 2024		Polish Built - Polnocny D
INS Mahish	L19	Kumbhir class	4 June 1985	11 November 2016		Polish Built - Polnocny D
INS Guldar	L21	Kumbhir class	December 1985	12 January 2024		Polish Built - Polnocny D
INS Kumbhir	L22	Kumbhir class	November 1986	12 January 2024		Polish Built - Polnocny D
Landing Ship Infantry
HMIS El Hind		merchant requisitioned as Landing ship, infantry	1943		14 April 1944 destroyed in Bombay Explosion (1944)	
Landing Craft Tank (re-designated Landing Craft Utility)
INS LCU 31	L31	LCU Mk.1	1978	1 Feb 1999		Ordered in 1974
INS LCU 32	L32	LCU Mk.1	6 November 1981	May 2011		Ordered in 1974
INS LCU 33	L33	LCU Mk.2	1 December 1980	mid April 2014		Ordered in 1975
INS LCU 34	L34	LCU Mk.2	28 January 1980	May 2011		Ordered in 1975
INS LCU 35	L35	LCU Mk.2				Ordered in 1975
INS LCU 36	L36	LCU Mk.3		9 February 2018		Ordered in 1982
INS LCU 37	L37	LCU Mk.3		9 February 2018		Ordered in 1982
INS LCU 38	L38	LCU Mk.3		30 March 2019		Ordered in 1982
INS LCU 39	L39	LCU Mk.3		30 March 2019		Ordered in 1982

=== Patrol Ships ===
Ship	Pennant	Class	Commissioned	Decommissioned	Fate	Notes
Offshore Patrol Vessel
HMIS RAMDAS		requisitioned armed merchant ship	1940	1945	returned to merchant service.	
HMIS Jamnagar		requisitioned armed merchant ship	1940	1947	sold and became M/V Hellenic Bulbul.	
HMIS Ratnagiri		requisitioned armed merchant ship	1940			
HMIS Hiravati		requisitioned armed merchant ship	1940			
HMIS Prabhavati		requisitioned armed merchant ship	1940		Sunk by friendly fire by HMS Glasgow	
HMIS Dipavati		auxiliary patrol vessel				
HMIS Sonvati		auxiliary patrol vessel				
INS Sarayu	P54	Sukanya class	8 October 1991	2000	Sold to Sri Lanka in 2000 and in service as the flagship of Sri Lanka Navy, SLNS Sayura	
Patrol Vessel
INS Ajay		Ajay class	1961	26 July 1974	Transferred to the Bangladesh Navy on 26 July 1974, served as BNS Surma and was eventually decommissioned	
INS Amar		Ajay class	11 July 1969	March 1974	Transferred to Mauritius and commissioned as MNS Amar on 3 April 1974. She was later re-commissioned in the Mauritius Coast Guard as CGS Amar on 24 July 1987. She served as Mauritius's only naval vessel for over two decades, and was decommissioned on 19 March 1998.	
INS Ajit		Ajay class	9 December 1969	July 1971		Foundered, Written-off
INS Atul		Ajay class	11 June 1970	1980		
INS Akshay		Ajay class		12 April 1973	Transferred to Bangladesh Navy on 12 April 1973 and served as BNS Padma and was eventually decommissioned	
INS Abhay		Ajay class	13 November 1961	20 June 1980		
INS Pamban		Pulicat class	18 February 1967	1977	Transferred to newly formed Indian Coast Guard.	
INS Puri		Pulicat class	18 February 1967	1977	Transferred to newly formed Indian Coast Guard.	
INS Pulicat		Pulicat class	16 March 1967	1977	Transferred to newly formed Indian Coast Guard.	
INS Panaji		Pulicat class	16 March 1967	1977	Transferred to newly formed Indian Coast Guard.	
INS Panvel		Pulicat class	16 March 1967	1977	Led Task Force Alpha in 1971-India Pakistan war.Transferred to newly formed Indian Coast Guard.	
INS Seaward	T54	Seaward defence boat	September 1982	20 January 2006	Sunk to be made into an artificial reef	
INS Tarmugli	T64	Trinkat class	4 March 2002	23 February 2005	Transferred to Seychelles Coast Guard, as SCG PS Topaz	
INS Tillanchang	T62	Trinkat class	17 March 2001	16 April 2006	Transferred to Maldivian Coast Guard, as CGS Huravee	
INS Seawaves	T57	Seaward defence boat		24 August 2006		
INS Seawater	T55	Seaward defence boat		2008–2009		
INS Seawind	T56	Seaward defence boat		2008–2009		
INS Seasand	T59	Seaward defence boat		7 September 2009		
INS Searock	T60	Seaward defence boat		7 September 2009		
INS Seastorm	T58	Seaward defence boat		20 July 2010		
INS Tarasa	T63	Trinkat class	24 August 2001	7 November 2014	Transferred to Seychelles Coast Guard as PS Constant	
INFAC T-82	T82	Super Dvora Mk II class	9 October 2003	6 October 2025		

=== Auxiliaries ===
Ship	Pennant	Class	Commissioned	Decommissioned	Fate	Notes
Troopship
HMIS Dalhousie		Unique ship	1886	1945	scrapped in 1945	Later depot ship at Basra, Bombay and Karachi
Tanker
HMIS Chilka; Renamed INS Chilka post republic.		Unique ship	1948	1976	scrapped in 1977	
INS Shakti		Unique ship	29 January 1954	31 December 1967	scrapped c.1975	Italian-built tanker purchased new in 1953
INS Deepak	A50	Deepak class	20 November 1967	30 April 1996		
INS Shakti	A57	Deepak class	31 December 1975	21 July 2007		
Submarine Tender
INS Amba	A54	Modified Ugra class	28 December 1968	July 2006	scrapped	
Survey Ships
HMIS Investigator		Unique ship	1932	1951		
INS Investigator		Modified River class	1951	30 September 1974	scrapped	former HMS Trent purchased in 1946 and renamed HMIS Kukri. Modified and converted to Survey Ship in 1950.
INS Darshak		Unique ship	1964	15 Jan 1990		
INS Makar	J31	Makar Class	31 January 1984	4 April 2005		
INS Mithun	J32	Makar Class	31 March 1984	31 March 2007		
INS Meen	J33	Makar Class	23 June 1984	24 April 2005	expended as a target for BrahMos test.	
INS Mesh	J34	Makar Class	31 October 1984	1 February 1999		
INS Nirdeshak	J19	Sandhayak-class survey ship	4 October 1983	19 December 2014		
INS Sandhayak	J18	Sandhayak-class survey ship	14 March 1981	4 June 2021		
Torpedo Recovery Vessel
INS A-71	A71	Astravahini-class	15 September 1982	25 March 2005		
INS A-72	A72	Astravahini-class	23 February 1983	6 Nov 2014	sunk in an accident on 6 Nov 2014	
INS A-73	A73	Astravahini-class	5 November 1984	16 July 2015		

==== Auxilary Patrol Vessels ====
- HMIS Parvati
- HMIS Netravati

==== Barges ====
- INS Posak
- INS Puran
- INS Pushpa
- INS Prema
- INS Ambuda

==== Ferryboats ====
- INS Manohar
- INS Modak
- INS Mangal
- INS Madhur
- INS Manorama
- INS Manjula

==== Tug boats ====
- INS Gaj
- INS Matanga
- INS Anand
- INS Atal
- INS Anjan
- INS Angad
- INS Anup
- INS Athak
- INS Ajral
- INS Balaram
- INS Bajrang
- INS Bahadur
- INS Ajanta
- INS Aja

=== Mooring Vessels ===
- INS Dhruvak

== See also ==
- List of historical equipment of the Indian Coast Guard
- Indian navy related
  - Aircraft of the Indian Navy
  - List of active Indian Navy ships
  - List of Indian naval aircraft
  - List of Indian Navy bases
  - List of submarines of the Indian Navy
  - List of warships gifted by India
  - List of destroyer classes of the Indian Navy
- Indian military related
  - India-China Border Roads
  - Indian military satellites
  - List of active Indian military aircraft
  - List of Indian Air Force stations
  - List of equipment of the Indian Coast Guard
  - India's overseas military bases
  - Indian Nuclear Command Authority

== Sources ==
- Collins, J.T.E. The Royal Indian Navy, 1939–1945. Official History of the Indian Armed Forces in the Second World War. New Delhi: Combined Inter-Services Historical Section (India & Pakistan), 1964.
- Parkes, Oscar. Jane's Fighting Ships 1931. Newton Abbot, Devon, UK:Davis & Charles Reprints, 1931 (1973 reprint). ISBN 0-7153-5849-9.
- Singh, Satyindra (1992). Blueprint to Bluewater, the Indian Navy, 1951–65. Lancer Publishers & Distributors. p. 72. ISBN 978-81-7062-148-5.
- Rohwer, Jürgen; Hummelchen, Gerhard (1992). Chronology of the War at Sea 1939–1945. Annapolis, Maryland: Naval Institute Press. ISBN 1-55750-105-X.
- Streatfeild-James, E. C. (1983). In the Wake: The Birth of the Indian and Pakistani Navies. Skilton. ISBN 9780284985804.
- Hore, Peter (5 November 2012). Dreadnought to Daring: 100 Years of Comment, Controversy and Debate in The Naval Review. Seaforth Publishing, 2012. ISBN 978-1-84832-148-9.
- Moore, John (Ed). Jane's Fighting Ships 1980–81. Jane's. 1980. ISBN 0-7106-0703-2
