= List of warships gifted by India =

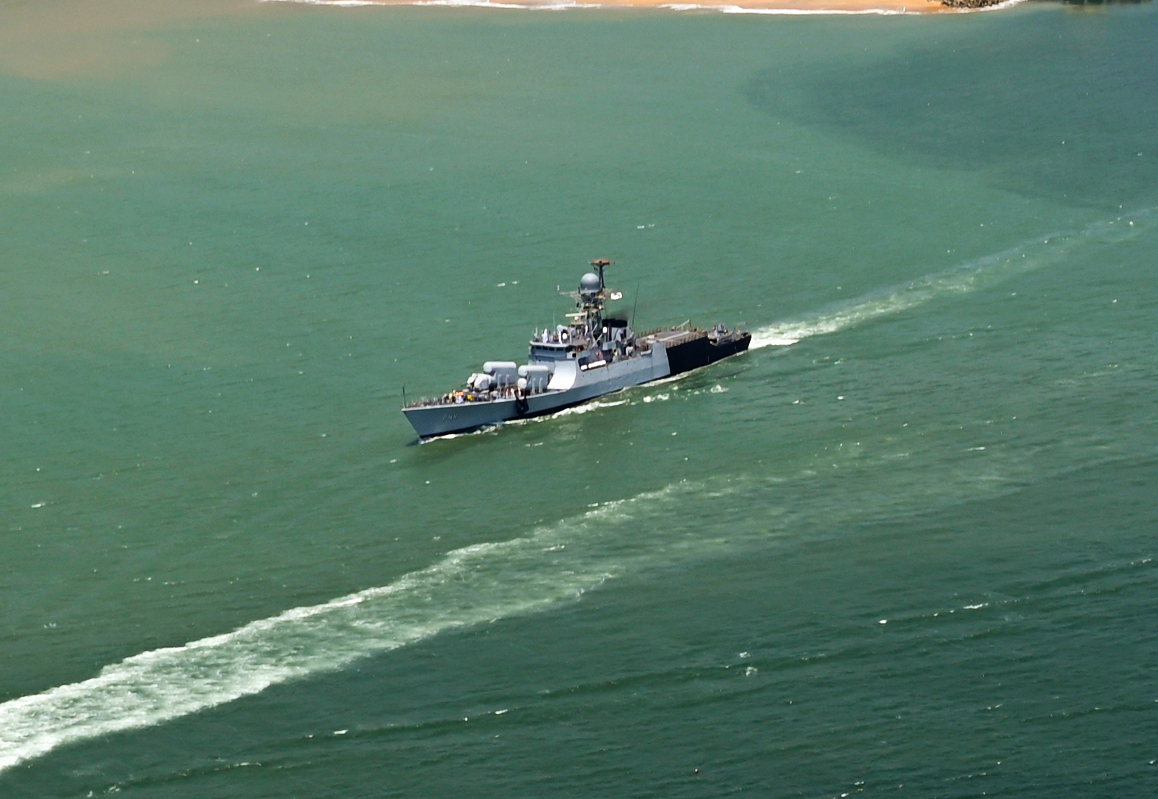
INS Kirpan (P44) departing India to be gifted to Vietnam.

The following is a list of warships gifted by India to other countries.

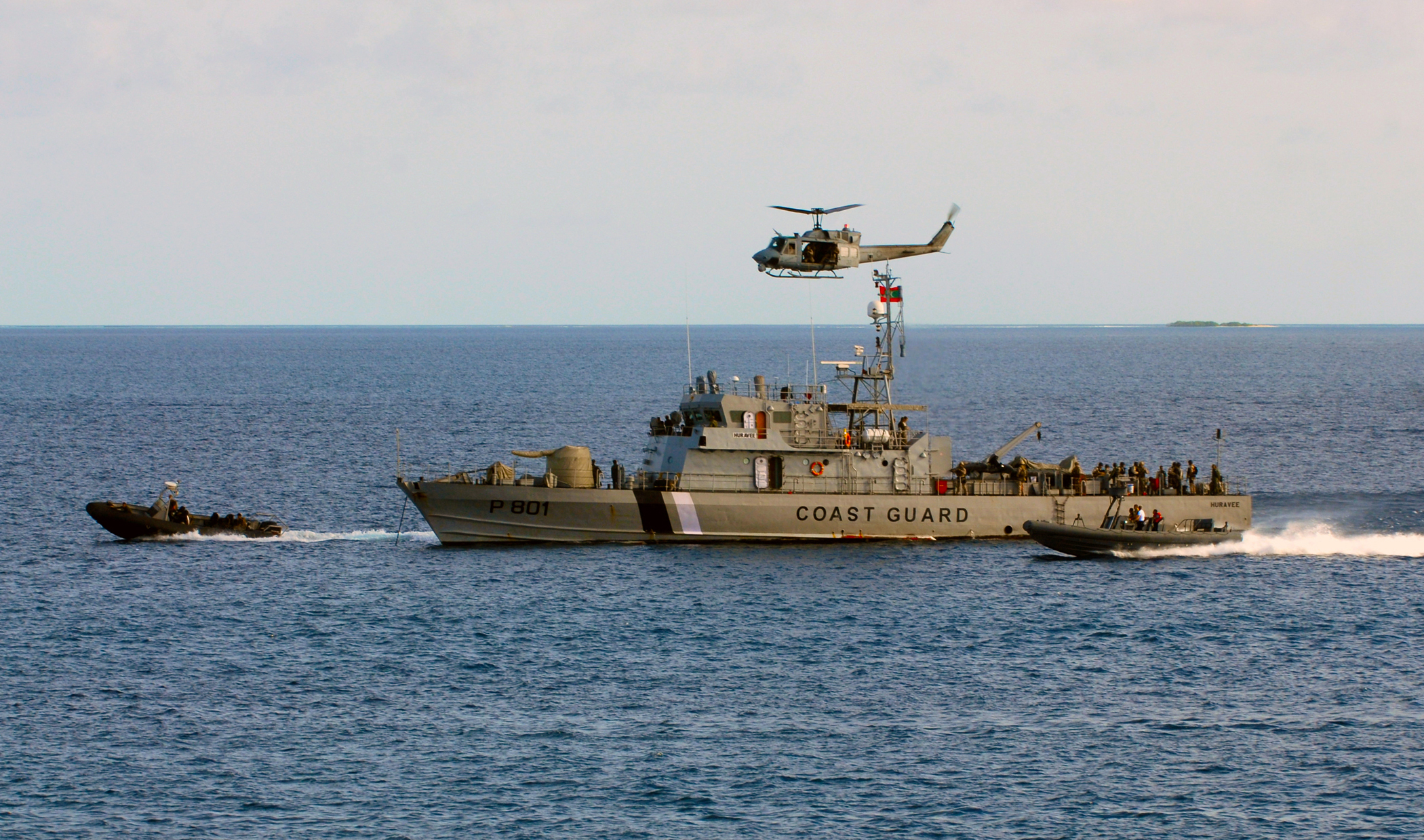
MCGS Huravee

| Recipient | Vessel | Class | Year | Ref |
|---|---|---|---|---|
| Bangladesh | BNS Padma | Ajay-class Patrol vessel | 1973 | |
| Bangladesh | BNS Surma | Ajay-class Patrol vessel | 1974 | |
| Vietnam | HQ-26 | Khukri-class corvette | 2023 | |
| Myanmar | UMS Minye Theinkhathu | Kilo-class submarine | 2020 | |
| Maldives | | Fast Patrol Vessel and Landing Craft Assault ship | 2023 | |
| Maldives | | offshore patrol vessel | 2019 | |
| Maldives | MCGS Huravee | Trinkat class patrol vessel | 2006 | |
| Mauritius | ex-INS Amar | seaward defence boat | 1974 | |
| Mauritius | | 9 Mandovi class patrol boat and replaced them with 5 Praga class patrol craft | 2000 | |
| Mauritius | T61 | SDB Mk.3 patrol boat | 1993 | |
| Mauritius | CGS Observer | AMPL (P-2000)-class interceptor boat | 2001 | |
| Seychelles | Fast Patrol Vessel | | 2021 | |
| Seychelles | PS Constant | Trinkat-class patrol vessel | 2014 | |
| Seychelles | PS Topaz | Trinkat-class patrol vessel | 2005 | |
| Seychelles | PS Lespwar | | | |
| Seychelles | Fast Interceptor Craft (FIC) C-449 (Note: The ship has been rechristened PB Boudeuse after commissioning by Seychelles Defence Forces.) | | 2025 | |
| Mozambique | 2 Fast Interceptor Boats | | 2019 | |
| Mozambique | 2 Fast Interceptor Boats | | 2021 | |
| Mozambique | 2 waterjet powered Fast Interceptor Boats | | 2024 | |
| Sri Lanka | ICGS Varaha | Vikram class offshore patrol vessel | 2015 | |

== Notes ==
These were gifted by India to friendly and neighboring countries, and the ships were not exported or sold.
