= INS Prabal =

The following ships of the Indian Navy have been named INS Prabal:

- INS Prabal (K93) was a Chamak-class missile boat of the Indian Navy which served in the Indo-Pakistani War of 1971
- INS Prabal (K92) is a Veer-class corvette, currently in active service with the Indian Navy
