= BNS Surma =

Two ships of Bangladesh Navy carried the name BNS Surma:

- BNS Surma (1974), an Ajay-class patrol vessel gifted by Indian Navy.
- BNS Surma (2013), a Padma-class patrol vessel currently in service.
