= Rama Raghoba Rane =

Indian military officer (1918–1994)

Major Rama Raghoba Rane PVC
- Born: 26 June 1918; Chendia, Karwar District, Bombay Presidency, British India (now Karnataka, India)
- Died: 11 July 1994 (aged 76); Pune, Maharashtra
- Military career
- Allegiance: British India (1940-1947); India (1947-1968)
- Branch: British Indian Army; Indian Army
- Service years: 1940–1968
- Rank: Major
- Service number: IC-7244
- Unit: Bombay Sappers
- Conflicts: Second World War; Indo-Pakistani War of 1947
- Awards: Param Vir Chakra

Major Rama Raghoba Rane, PVC (26 June 1918 – 11 July 1994) was an Indian military officer. He was the first living recipient of India's highest military decoration, the Param Vir Chakra, which he was awarded along with Karam Singh.

Born in 1918, Rane served in the British Indian Army during the Second World War. He remained in the military during the post-war period and was commissioned in the Bombay Sappers Regiment of the Indian Army's Corps of Engineers on 15 December 1947. In April 1948, during the Indo-Pakistani War of 1947, Rane played a key role in the capture of Rajauri by Indian forces by being instrumental in clearing several roadblocks and minefields. His actions helped clear the way for advancing Indian tanks. He was awarded the Param Vir Chakra on 8 April 1948 for his gallantry. He retired as a major from the Indian Army in 1968. During his 28 years' service with the army, he was mentioned in dispatches five times. He died in 1994 at the age of 76.

== Early life ==
Rama Raghoba Rane was born in a poor priest family on 26 June 1918 in the Chendia village, Karnataka in a Konkani speaking Maratha family. He was the son of Raghoba. P. Rane, a police constable from Chendia village of Uttara Kannada district in Karnataka. Rane's early education, mostly in district school, was chaotic due to his father's frequent transfers. In 1930, he became influenced by the Non-Cooperation Movement, which campaigned for Indian independence from British rule. His involvement with the movement alarmed his father, who moved the family back to their ancestral village at Chendia.

== Military career ==
At the age of 22, Rane decided to join the British Indian Army, while the Second World War was in full swing. On 10 July 1940, Rane enlisted in the Bombay Engineer Regiment, and passed out as the "Best Recruit", awarded the Commandant's Cane. Subsequently, he was promoted to Naik (corporal).

After his training, Rane was posted to the 28th Field Company, an engineering unit of the 26th Infantry Division which, at the time, was fighting the Japanese in Burma. As his division retreated from the Japanese after the failed Arakan Campaign, he, along with his two sections, was hand-picked by his company commander to stay back behind at Buthidaung to destroy key assets and then be evacuated by the Royal Indian Navy. Though the objective was soon achieved, the expected pickup did not happen. This forced Rane and his men to cross a river that was patrolled by the Japanese to reach their lines. Rane, along with his two sections, expertly evaded the Japanese troops, and joined the 26th Infantry Division at Bahri. For his actions, he was promoted to havaldar (sergeant).

Rane later received a Viceroy's Commission as a jemadar (now the rank of naib subedar, equivalent to a warrant officer). For his persistence and leadership qualities, Rane was selected for a short-service commission prior to the partition. In 1947, following his country's independence, Rane remained in the new Indian Army and was commissioned in the Corps of Engineers on 15 December 1947 as a second lieutenant (seniority from 14 January 1948).

=== War of 1947 ===
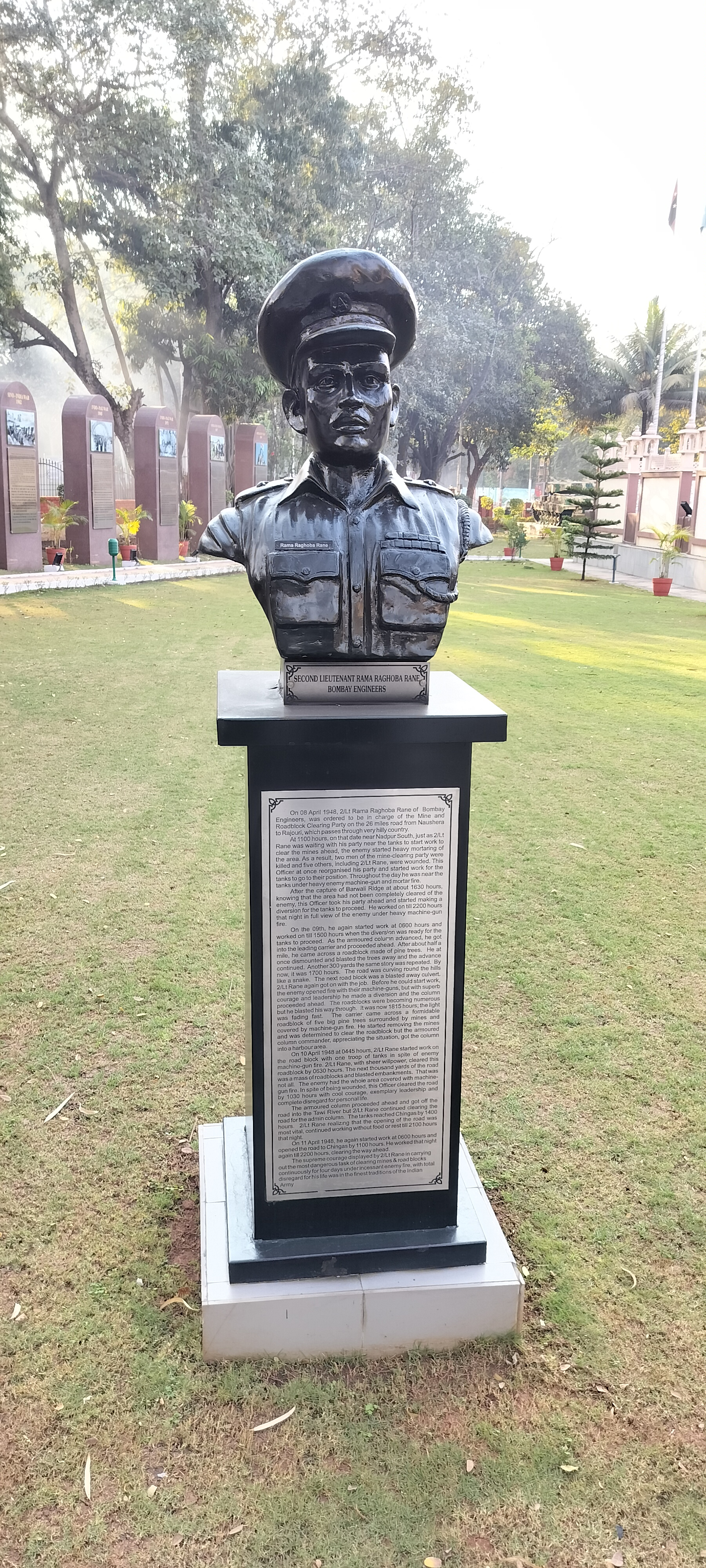
Bust of Lt. Rama Raghoba Rane at the National War Memorial, Pune

On 18 March 1948, Jhangar, lost in December 1947 to the Pakistanis, was recaptured by troops of the Indian Army, which then started to move towards Rajauri from Naushahra sector. On 8 April 1948, the 4th Dogra Battalion advanced to Rajauri. During the advance, the battalion attacked and captured the Barwali ridge, eleven kilometers to the north of Naushahra. The battalion's advance beyond Barwali was obstructed by the increasing number of roadblocks and minefields. Supporting tanks were also unable to cross the obstacles.

Rane, in command of a section of the 37th Assault Field Company, attached to the 4th Dogra Battalion, was sent forward to help clear a path for the battalion. As Rane and his team started clearing a minefield, mortar fire from the Pakistanis killed two sappers and wounded five others, including Rane. Despite this, by the evening of 8 April, Rane and his surviving men cleared the minefield which enabled the supporting tanks to move forward. A safe lane still had to be prepared for the tanks as the road ahead was still dangerous; the Pakistani forces had yet to be cleared from the area. This lane was created by Rane through the night. The next day, his section worked for twelve continuous hours to clear mines and roadblocks. As the road was still too difficult to deal with, he made a diversion for the battalion to forward. Rane continued this work despite ongoing artillery and mortar fire from the Pakistanis.

On 10 April, Rane got up early and resumed work on an obstacle that had not been cleared the previous night. Within a span of two hours, he cleared the roadblock of five large pine trees in the midst of mines and machine-gun fire. This allowed the 4th Dogra Battalion to advance another thirteen kilometers until it encountered another major roadblock. The Pakistani forces were situated on the adjoining hills and able to fire on all approaches to the block, making its destruction problematic. Rane drove a tank to the roadblock and took cover behind the tank while blasting open the roadblock with mines, opening the road before the end of the night.

The next day, Rane worked for another seventeen hours to open the road to Chingas, which lay half-way between Rajauri and Naushahra on an old Mughal route, and beyond. During the period from 8 to 11 April, he had made a significant contribution in the Indian advance to Rajauri. His work not only cost the Pakistani forces about 500 dead and many more wounded, but also saved many civilians in the area from Chingas and Rajauri.

==== Param Vir Chakra ====
On 21 June 1950, Rane's award of the Param Vir Chakra, for his actions on 8 April 1948 during the advance to Rajauri, was gazetted. The official citation reads:

On 8 April 1948, Second Lieutenant Rama Raghoba Rane, Bombay Engineers, was ordered to be in charge of the mine and roadblock clearing party at Mile 26 on the Naushera-Rajouri road which passes through very hilly country. At 1100 hours, on that date near Nadpur South, just as Second Lieutenant Rane and his party were waiting near the tanks to start the work of clearing the mines ahead, the enemy started heavy mortaring of the area, with the result that two men of the mine-clearing party were killed and five others including Second Lieutenant Rane were wounded. The officer at once reorganized his party and started work for the tanks to go on to their position. Throughout the day he was near the tanks under heavy enemy machine-gun and mortar fire. After the capture of Barwali Ridge at about 1630 hours, although knowing that the enemy had not been completely cleared of the area, Second Lieutenant Rane took his party ahead and started making a diversion for the tanks to proceed. He worked on till 2200 hours that night in full view of the enemy and under heavy machine-gun fire. On 9 April he again started work at 0600 hours and worked on till 1500hrs when the diversion was ready for the tanks to proceed. As the armoured column advanced, he got into the leading carrier and proceeded ahead. After proceeding about half a mile he came across a roadblock made of pine trees. He at once dismounted and blasted the trees away. The advance continued. Another 300 yards and the same story was repeated. By this time it was getting on to 1700 hours. The road was curving round the hill like a snake. The next roadblock was a demolished culvert. Second Lieutenant Rane again got on with the job. Before he could start work, the enemy opened up with their machine-guns, but with super courage and leadership he made a diversion and the column proceeded ahead. The roadblocks were becoming numerous but he blasted his way through. It was now 1815 hours, and light was fading fast. The carrier came across a formidable roadblock of five big pine trees surrounded by mines and covered by machine-gun fire. He started removing the mines and was determined to clear the roadblock but the armoured column commander appreciating the situation got the column into a harbour area. On 10 April 1948 at 0445 hours, Second Lieutenant Rane again started work on the roadblock in spite of machine-gun fire with the support of one troops of tanks. With sheer will power he cleared this roadblock by 0630hours. The next thousand yards was a mass of roadblocks and blasted embankments. That was not all. The enemy had the whole area covered with machine-gun fire but with superhuman efforts, in spite of having been wounded, with cool courage and exemplary leadership and complete disregard for personal life, he cleared the road by 1030 hours. The armoured column proceeded ahead and got off the road into the riverbed of the Tawi but Second Lieutenant Rane continued clearing the road for the administrative column. The tanks reached Chingas by 1400 hours. Second Lieutenant Rane appreciating that the opening of the road was most vital, continued working without rest or food till 2100 hours that night. On 11 April 1948, he again started work at 0600 hours and opened the road to Chingas by 1100 hours. He worked on that night till 2200 hours clearing the road ahead.

— Gazette Notification: 5 Pres/50, 21-6-50,

=== Subsequent career and later life ===
After the war, Rane was promoted to lieutenant on 14 January 1950 and to captain on 14 January 1954. On 27 May 1955, he received a regular commission as a captain, with the service number IC-7244. He retired with the rank of major on 25 June 1968. (Note: It is unclear when Rane was promoted to major. The Gazette of India notification of his retirement dated 27 February 1970 lists him as "Capt. R. R. Rane PVC (IC 7244), Engineers") During the course of his military's career, Rane was mentioned in despatches five times. He was subsequently employed as a member of the civilian staff of the Indian Army. He remained in the employment of the army until 7 April 1971 at which time he retired from the workforce. He died in 1994 at Command Hospital, Southern Command in Pune, survived by his wife, three sons and a daughter.

== Legacy ==
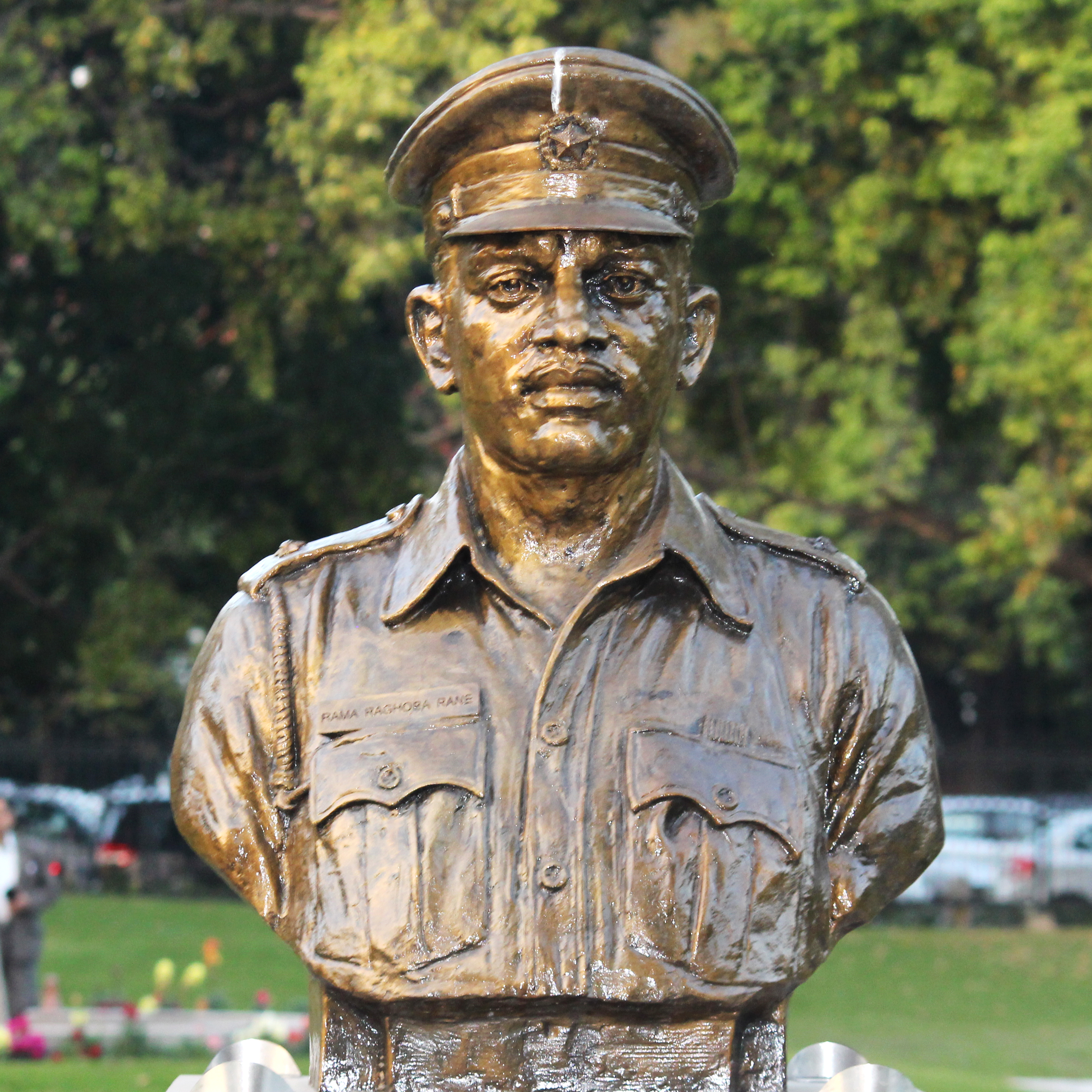
Rane's statue at Param Yodha Sthal, National War Memorial, New Delhi

The Shipping Corporation of India (SCI), a Government of India enterprise under the aegis of the Ministry of Shipping, named fifteen of her crude oil tankers in honour of the Param Vir Chakra recipients. The crude oil tanker named MT Lieutenant Rama Raghoba Rane, PVC was delivered to SCI on 8 August 1984. The tanker was phased out after 25 years service.

A statue in Rane's memory was unveiled in a ceremony on 7 November 2006 in his hometown Karwar at Rabindranath Tagore beach, Karnataka, alongside INS Chapal Warship Museum. It was inaugurated by Shivanand Naik, former Minister for Small Industries, and presided over then Flag Officer Commander-in-Chief, Western Command, Vice Admiral Sangram Singh Byce.

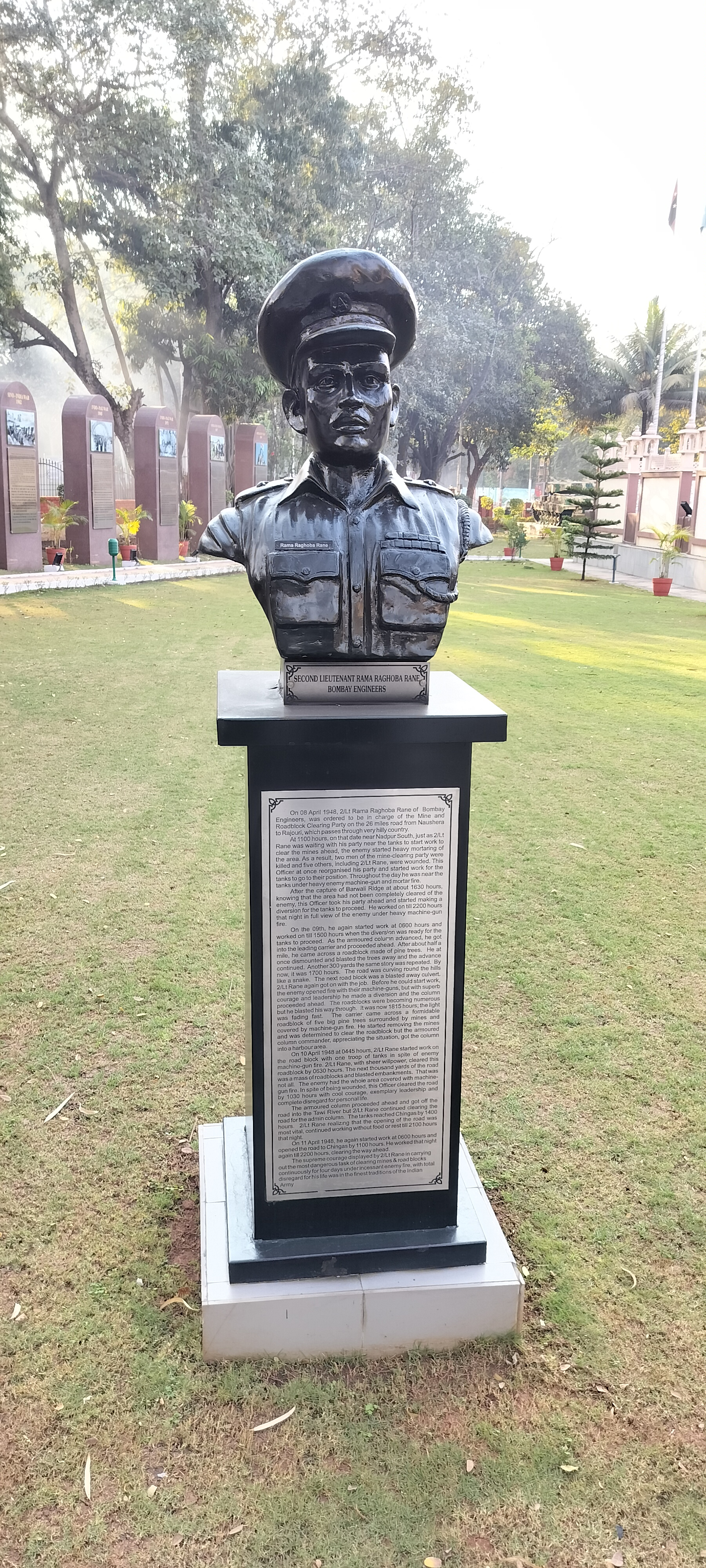
Bust of Lt. Rama Raghoba Rane in Poone
