= INS Khanjar =

Khukri-class corvette in service with the Indian Navy

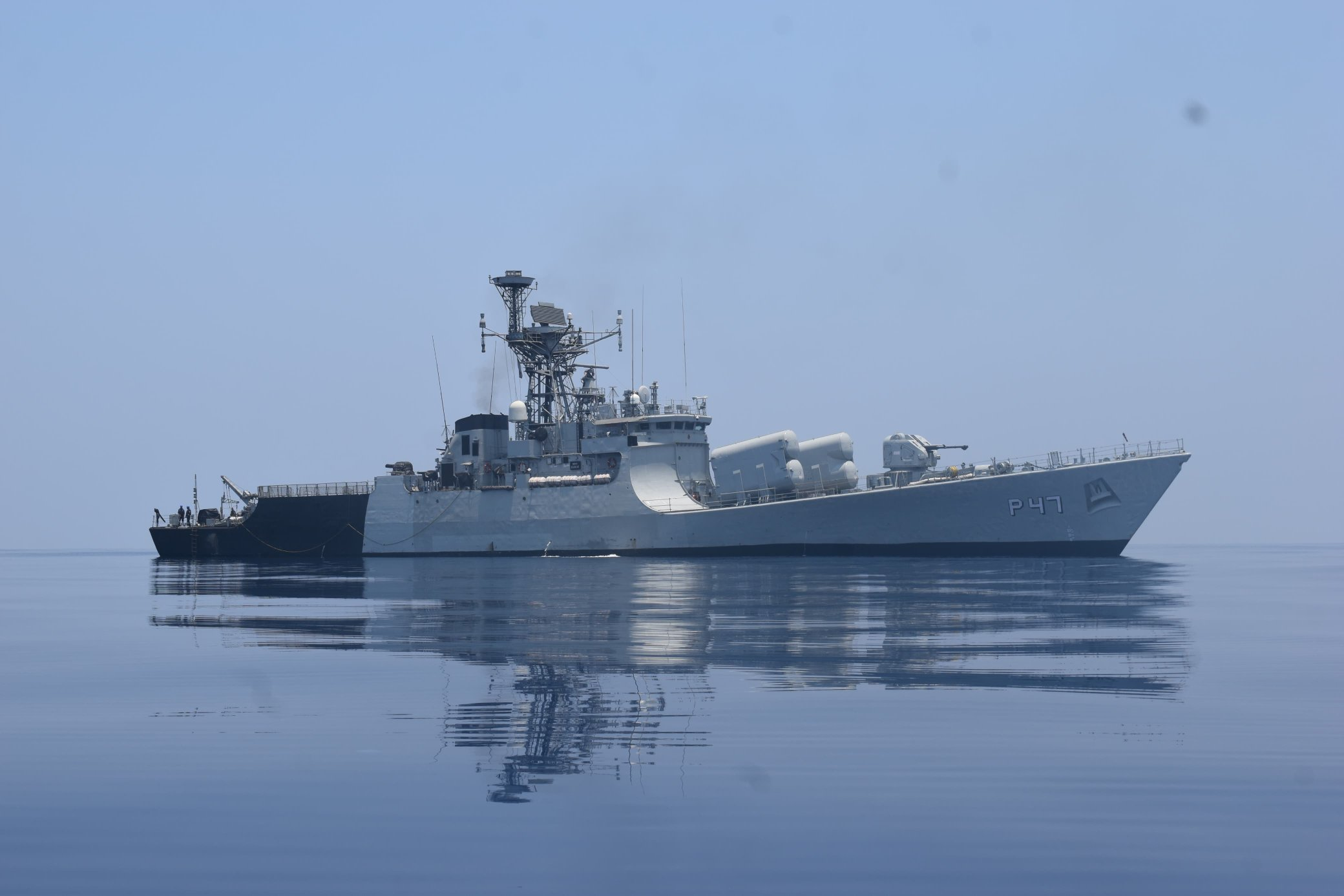
- Khanjar (P47) at sea.

History

India
- Name: INS Khanjar
- Namesake: "Dagger"
- Builder: Garden Reach Shipbuilders and Engineers
- Laid down: 15 November 1985
- Launched: 16 August 1988
- Commissioned: 22 October 1991
- Identification: Pennant number: P47
- Status: Active
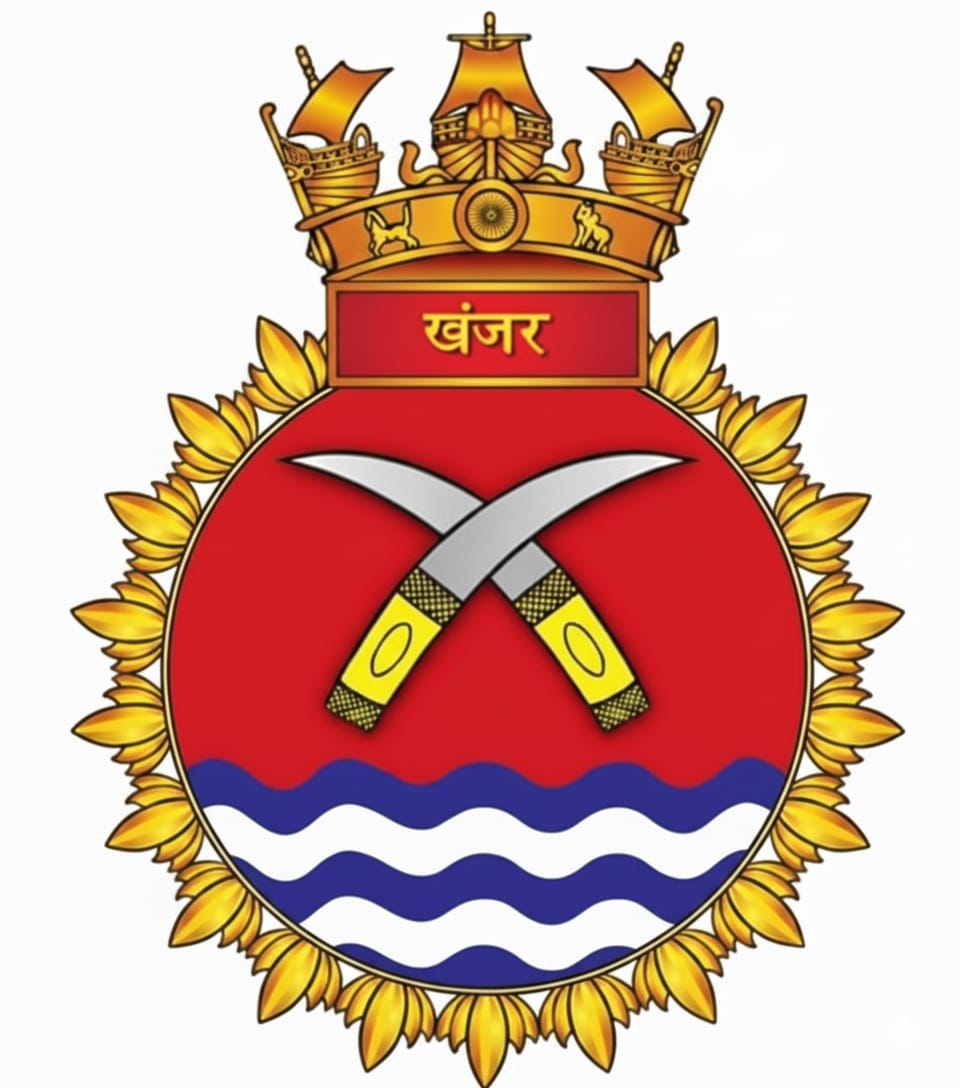
- Badge

General characteristics
- Class & type: Khukri-class corvette
- Displacement: 1350 tons (full load)
- Length: 91.1 metres
- Beam: 10.5 metres
- Draught: 4.5 metres
- Propulsion: 2 diesel engines with 14,400hp; 2 shafts
- Speed: 25 knots (50 km/h)
- Range: 4,000 nmi (7,400 km) at 16 knots (30 km/h)
- Complement: 79 (incl. 10 officers)
- Sensors & processing systems: MR 352 Pozitiv-E radar; Garpun-Bal radar; Bharat 1245 navigation radar
- Armament: 4 × P-20M (SS-N-2D) AShMs; 2 × Strela-2M (SA-N-5) SAM; 1 × AK–176 76mm gun; 2 × 30mm AK-630 guns
- Aircraft carried: 1 helicopter (HAL Chetak)

INS Khanjar is a Khukri-class corvette, currently in service with the Indian Navy.

== History ==
On 30 November 2002 on the high seas off the coast of Vizhinjam, a mock attack drill was being staged, with the Khanjar targeting INS Jamuna, a hydrographic survey vessel carrying media persons and VIPs, including Air Vice Marshal R. D. Limaye of the Southern Air Command. This was part of the Navy Week celebrations.

Khanjar along with INS Kora was on a visit to Kolkata between 28 and 30 November 2025 as part of that year's Navy Week celebrations. The ships were open to public visitors. She also participated at the International Fleet Review 2026 held at Visakapatanam.
