= INS Ajay (1960) =

History

India
- Name: INS Ajay
- Builder: Garden Reach Workshop, Kolkata
- Fate: Transferred to Bangladesh

General characteristics
- Class & type: Ajay-class patrol vessel
- Displacement: 120 tons (standard); 151 tons (full)
- Length: 35.7 m (117 ft 2 in)
- Beam: 6.1 m (20 ft 0 in)
- Draught: 1.9 m (6 ft 3 in)
- Propulsion: 2 Paxman YHAXM diesel engines; 1,000 hp (750 kW); 2 shafts
- Complement: 35
- Armament: 1 x Bofors 40 mm gun; 4 x GIAT 20 mm F2 AA gun

INS Ajay was the first warship built in Independent India and the namesake of the Ajay-class patrol vessels. She was built by Garden Reach Shipbuilders and Engineers, and was delivered to the Indian Navy in 1961.

Following the independence of Bangladesh in 1971, the Indian Navy gave two patrol vessels to the newly-established nation in order to create the new Bangladesh Navy. INS Ajay's sister ship INS Akshay (P3136) was transferred as BNS Padma in April 1973, and in July 1974, INS Ajay herself was transferred as BNS Surma.

== See also ==
- List of historic ships of the Bangladesh Navy
