= K94 =

K94 or K-94 may refer to:

- K-94 (Kansas highway), a state highway in Kansas
- INS Chapal (K94), a former Indian Navy ship
