= INS Pralaya =

The following ships of the Indian Navy have been named INS Pralaya:

- INS Pralaya (1976) was a Chamak-class missile boat of the Indian Navy which served in the Indo-Pakistani War of 1971
- INS Pralaya (K91) is a Veer-class corvette currently in active service with the Indian Navy
