= Seaward defence boats =

Seaward defence boats, a type of small patrol vessel, can refer to:

- Ford-class seaward defence boat
- Seaward-class defense boats
- post WWII redesignated Harbour defence motor launch
