= Hildersham (disambiguation) =

== Places ==
- Hildersham, Cambridgeshire, a village in eastern England
  - Hildersham Hill, a hill of height 95m near the village

== People ==
- Arthur Hildersham (1563–1632), an English clergyman

== Miscellaneous ==
- HMS Hildersham (M2705), a British minesweeper named after the Cambridgeshire village
