= K93 =

K93 or K-93 may refer to:

- K-93 (Kansas highway), a former state highway in Kansas
- INS Prabal (K93), a former Indian Navy ship
