= Submarine tender =

Type of ship that supplies and supports submarines

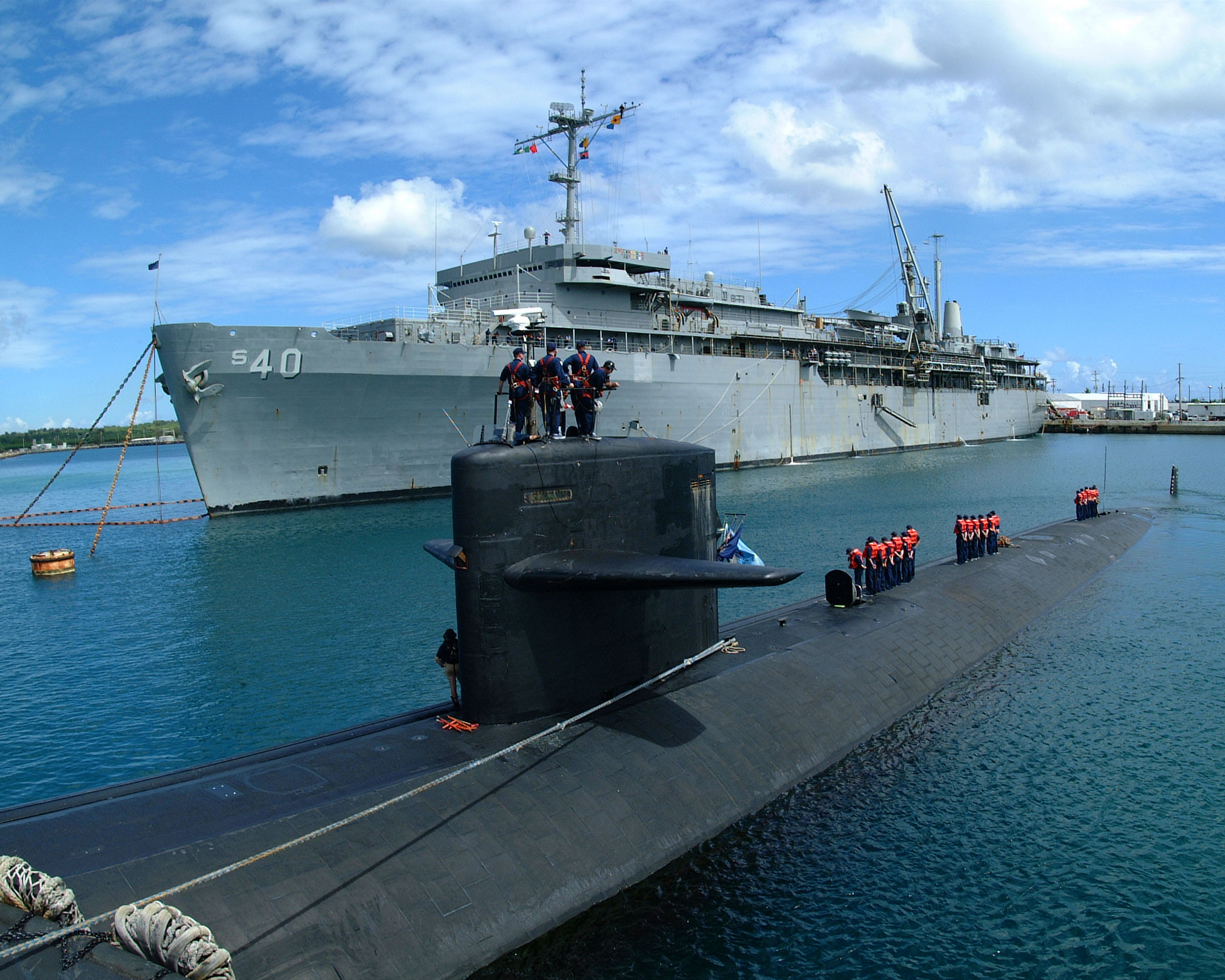
USS Frank Cable (back of picture), one of two submarine tenders maintained by the United States Navy. The attack submarine USS Salt Lake City (SSN-716) is in the foreground.

A submarine tender, in British usage a submarine depot ship, is a type of depot ship that supplies and supports submarines.

== Development ==
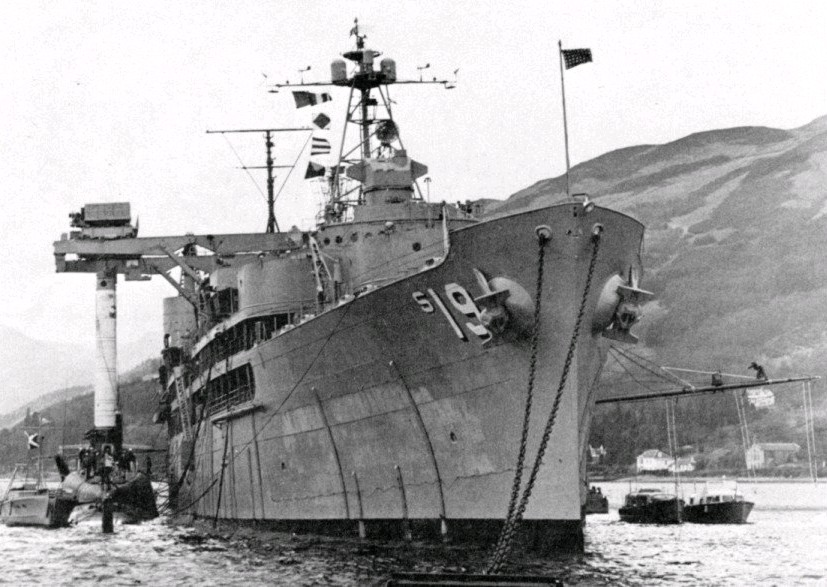
Transfer of a Polaris submarine-launched ballistic missile between the submarine tender USS Proteus (AS-19) and the ballistic missile submarine USS Patrick Henry (SSBN-599) at Holy Loch, Dunoon, Scotland, in 1961.

Submarines are small compared to most oceangoing vessels, and generally cannot carry large amounts of food, fuel, torpedoes, and other supplies, or a full array of maintenance equipment and personnel. The tender carries all these, and either meets submarines at sea to replenish them or provides these services while docked at a port near the submarines' operations zone. In some navies, the tenders were equipped with workshops for maintenance, and as floating dormitories with relief crews.

With the increased size and automation of modern submarines, plus in some navies the introduction of nuclear power, tenders are no longer as necessary for fuel as they once were.

=== Canada ===
Canada's first submarine depot ship was HMCS Shearwater.

=== Chile ===
The term used in the Chilean Navy is "submarine mother ship", as for example the BMS (buque madre de submarinos) Almirante Merino.

=== China ===
China's Type 926 submarine support ship is capable of replenishing submarines and rescuing those in distress.

=== France ===
During the 1930s and World War II, the French Navy and later the Free French Naval Forces operated the submarine tender Jules Verne. In 1948, the aircraft carrier Béarn was repurposed into that role.

=== Germany ===
Unable to operate a significant number of conventional surface tenders during World War II, Germany's Kriegsmarine used Type XIV submarines (nicknamed milk cows) for replenishment at sea.

=== Japan ===
Prior to and during World War II, the Imperial Japanese Navy operated submarine tenders, notably the Taigei and Jingei-class.

It also operated the Chitose-class, Mizuho, and Nisshin, seaplane carriers, being also designed as "midget submarine carriers", equipped to transport and support 12 midget submarines in addition to seaplanes.

Several of its largest cruiser submarines were also designed to transport, launch, and recover midget submarines.

=== The Netherlands ===
The Royal Netherlands Navy has one submarine support vessel, HNLMS Mercuur (A900), commissioned in 1987, as a replacement of HNLMS Onverschrokken (M886), then known as HNLMS Mercuur (A 856). Commissioned in 1956, as an ocean going Aggressive-class minesweeper, built in the US, and later used as a submarine tender.

=== Russia ===
The Russian Navy decommissioned all its Don and Ugra-class tenders inherited from the Soviet Navy by 2001. The last remaining ship of this class was INS Amba (A54), initially sold to the Indian Navy in 1968 for use with their fleet of Foxtrot-class submarines. She was reportedly decommissioned in July 2006.

=== United Kingdom ===
In the Royal Navy, the term used for a submarine tender is "submarine depot ship", for example HMS Medway and HMS Maidstone. List of Royal Navy submarine depot ships

- HMS Adamant (1911)
- HMS Adamant (A164)
- HMS Alecto (1911)
- HMS Ambrose (1914)
- HMS Arrogant (1896)
- HMS Bonaventure (1892)
- HMS Bonaventure (F139)
- HMS Cairo (1918)
- HMS Cyclops (F31)
- HMS Dolphin (1882)
- HMS Forth (A187)
- HMS Hazard (1894)
- HMS Lucia (F27)
- HMS Mackay
- HMS Maidstone (1912)
- HMS Maidstone (1937)
- HMS Medway (F25)
- HMS Rosario (1898)
- HMS Vulcan (1889)
- HMS Whitehall
- HMS Wuchang (F30)

=== United States ===
In the United States Navy, submarine tenders are considered auxiliary ships, with the hull classification symbol "AS". As of 2017, the U.S. Navy maintains two submarine tenders, USS Emory S. Land (AS-39) and USS Frank Cable (AS-40).

== See also ==
- Submarine rescue ship – similar ship meant for rescue and salvage of submarines
