= Balram-class tugboat =

Class of Indian tugboats

The Balram class of tugboats were a series of service watercraft built by Goa Shipyard Limited for the Indian navy. Each tug in the class has a rated capacity of 20 tonnes bollard pull. They are powered by twin Kirloskar SEMT-Pielistick (8PA4 V200) of total 3,200 hp (2,400 kW). They are also fitted with three monitors for fire fighting. INS Bajrang and INS Balram were stationed at Mumbai.

== Ships of the class ==
External image
- Balram class tugboat
- INS Balram

Yard no	Name	Delivery date	IMO number
1131	INS Balram	28 December 1988	8835762
1162	INS Bajrang	15 January 1991	8814859

== Specifications ==
- Gross tonnage: 216 ton
- DWT: 35 tons
- Length: 29.7 m
- Width: 9.7 m
- Draught: 4.3 meters
- Crew: 12 total
- Speed: 12 knots (22 km/h; 14 mph)

== See also ==
- Tugboats of the Indian Navy
