= INS Dhruvak =

About Indian Navy Mooring Vessel Used for Mooring Buoys and other Port Signages

INS Dhruvak is a mooring vessel built by Hindustan Shipyard Limited, Visakhapatnam for Indian Navy.

The Keel of the Yardcraft was laid on 27 January 1956 and it was launched on 16 July 1958. The vessel was delivered to Indian navy on 16 November 1956 and was the first vessel to be built for Indian Navy by the shipyard. The vessel has a length of 150 feet with a beam of 32 feet and has 900 tons of displacement. It has been fitted with a stream-reciprocating engine with coal-fired marine boilers.
