= INS Jamuna =

The following ships of the Indian Navy have been named Jamuna:

- INS Jamuna (U21) was formerly the Black Swan-class sloop HMIS Jumna commissioned in 1941
- INS Jamuna (J16) a hydrographic survey ship commissioned in 1991
