= INS Chamak =

Indian missile attack ship

Coordinates: 18.466616°N 73.765821°E

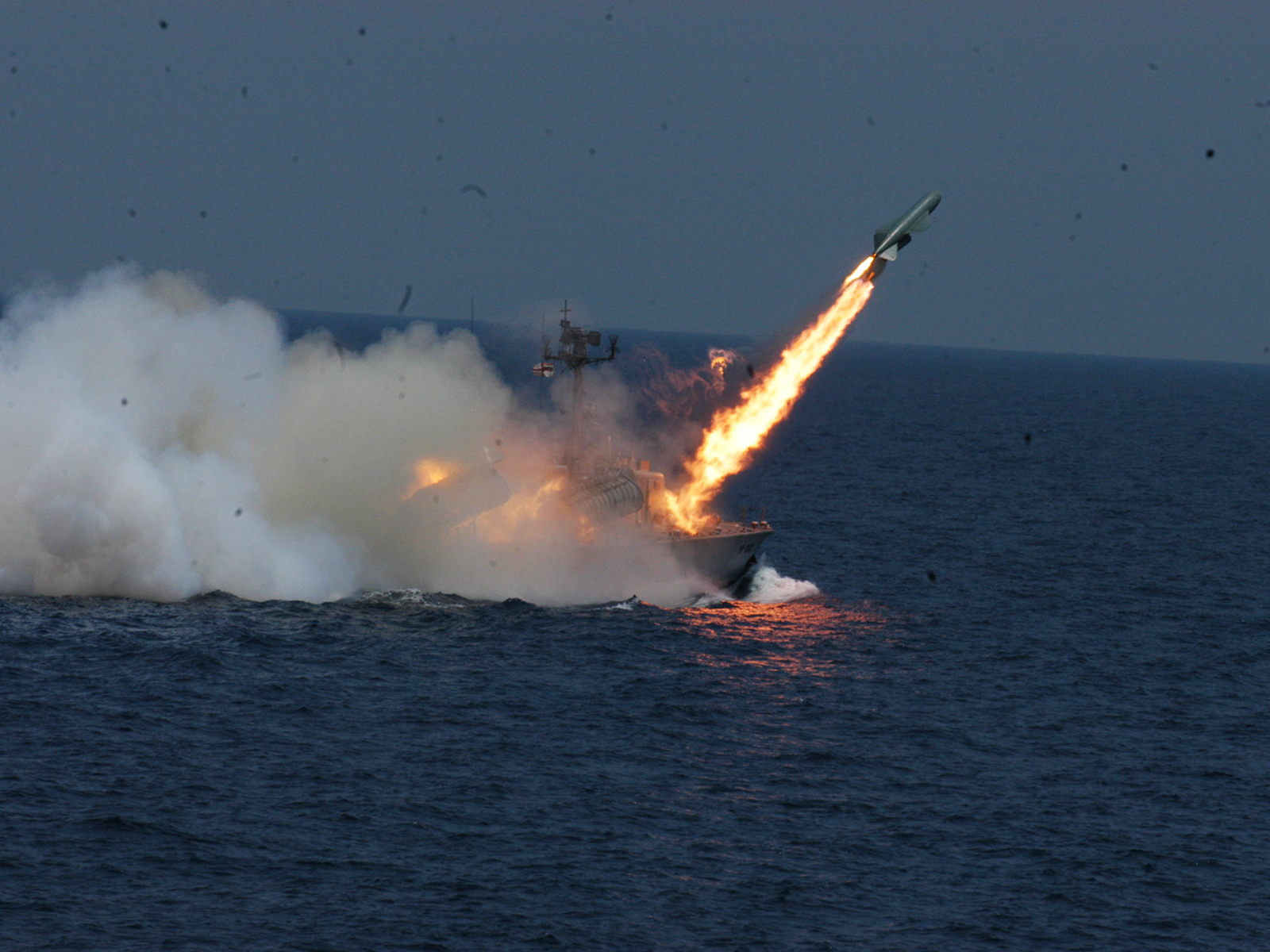
- INS Chamak (K95) fires a P-15 Termit missile.

History

India
- Name: INS Chamak
- Commissioned: 4 November 1976
- Decommissioned: 5 May 2005
- Status: Museum ship in Pune

General characteristics
- Class & type: Chamak class missile boat
- Displacement: 245 tons (full load)
- Length: 38.6 meters
- Beam: 7.6 meters
- Speed: 37+ knots
- Complement: 30
- Armament: 4 × SS-N-2A Styx AShM; 1 × SA-N-5 SAM; 2 × AK-230 30mm guns

INS Chamak (K95) (Glitter) was the lead vessel of her class of fast attack craft of the Indian Navy. The INS Chamak was first constructed throughout the 1970s, it had a displacement of 245 tons with its full load and measured about 38.6m long, it had a speed of over 37+ kts.

The INS Chamak was fully decommissioned on 5 May 2005 and was towed/sailed to Pune as a museum ship. INS Chamak was designed to be a modified version of the Project 205 Moskit-Class (Osa-class missile boats) of the Soviet Navy.

== Armaments ==
The INS Chamak was armed with a standard AK-230 30mm gun, commonly used as a sea-gun piece for typically less armored and less capable of open sea deployment vessels, it was armed with the SA-N-5 SAM system modified to be capable of sea-type deployment, and the SS-N-2A Styx (NATO Reporting Name: P-15 Termit) used for anti-ship deployments commonly used on weaker vessels, such as frigates and corvettes.
