= Pulicat-class patrol boat =

Military ship class

Pulicat class
Class overview
- Operators: India
- Preceded by: Ajay class
- Succeeded by: Seaward class (Indian Navy); Rajhans-class patrol vessel (Indian Coast Guard)
- Planned: 5
- Completed: 5
- Retired: 5

General characteristics
- Type: Patrol boat
- Displacement: 91 long tons (92 t)
- Length: 29.9 m (98 ft 1 in)
- Beam: 4.6 m (15 ft 1 in)
- Draft: 1.5 m (4 ft 11 in)
- Propulsion: 2 × diesel engines (2,400 hp (1,800 kW) total)
- Speed: 18 knots (33 km/h; 21 mph)
- Range: 460 nmi (850 km; 530 mi) at 17 knots (31 km/h; 20 mph)
- Complement: 16 initially, 30 later
- Armament: 1 × Bofors 40 mm gun, 2 x KPV heavy machine guns, 1 x SPG-9 Recoilless Rifle

The Pulicat class of patrol boats was a series of five watercraft of Soviet origin (ex-Poluchat class), which were in service of the Indian Navy and later transferred to the newly formed Indian Coast Guard in 1977. They were ordered in 1965 and delivered in 1967. INS Panvel took part in the Indo-Pakistani War of 1971. The boats in the series were named after coastal cities of India.

== Boats in the class ==
Name	Namesake	Date of commissioning	Notes
INS Pamban	Pamban Island	18 February 1967	Transferred to newly formed Indian Coast Guard in 1977. Decommissioned
INS Puri	Puri	18 February 1967	Transferred to newly formedIndian Coast Guard in 1977. Decommissioned
INS Pulicat	Pulicat Lake	16 March 1967	Transferred to newly formed Indian Coast Guard in 1977. Decommissioned
INS Panaji	Panjim	16 Mar 1967	Transferred to newly formed Indian Coast Guard in 1977. Decommissioned
INS Panvel	Panvel	16 Mar 1967	Transferred to newly formed Indian Coast Guard in 1977. Decommissioned

== See also ==
- Jija Bai-class patrol vessel
