= INS Prachand =

Chamak-class missile boat of the Indian Navy

History

India
- Name: INS Prachand
- Commissioned: 17 February 1976
- Decommissioned: 29 December 1999

General characteristics
- Class & type: Chamak-class missile boat
- Displacement: 245 tons (full load)
- Length: 38.6 m (126 ft 8 in)
- Beam: 7.6 m (24 ft 11 in)
- Speed: + 37 knots (69 km/h; 43 mph)
- Complement: 30
- Armament: 4 × SS-N-2A Styx anti-ship missiles; 1 × SA-N-5 surface-to-air missile; 2 × AK-230 30 mm guns

INS Prachand (K90) (Intense) was a Chamak-class missile boat of the Indian Navy.
