= Gaj-class tugboat =

Class of Indian Navy tugboats

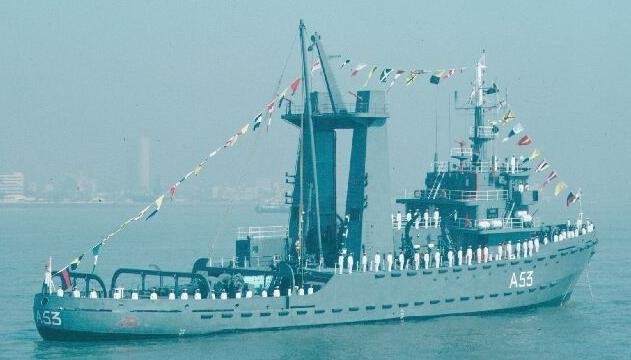
- INS Matanga, the second Gaj-class tugboat

Class overview
- Name: Gaj-class tugboat
- Builders: Garden Reach Shipbuilders & Engineers, Kolkata, India
- Operators: Indian Navy
- In commission: 1973–2017
- Completed: 2
- Active: 0
- Retired: 2

General characteristics
- Type: Ocean-going Tugboat
- Tonnage: 1,313 GT
- Displacement: 1,600 long tons (1,600 t) full load
- Length: 67.8 m (222 ft 5 in)
- Beam: 12.3 m (40 ft 4 in)
- Draught: 4 m (13 ft 1 in)
- Propulsion: 2 × Garden Reach G7V diesel engines; 2 shafts; 3,920 bhp (2,923 kW)
- Speed: 15 knots (28 km/h; 17 mph)
- Capacity: Bollard pull: 40 tons
- Complement: 75 including 6 officers
- Sensors & processing systems: Decca 1226 (I) Radar
- Armament: 1 × 40 mm 60-cal Bofors Mk 3 gun

The Gaj class offshore tugboats are a series of two auxiliary watercraft built by Garden Reach Shipbuilders & Engineers Ltd., Kolkata, for the Indian Navy. The vessels in the class are Indian Navy's biggest tugboats and can be used for towing aircraft carriers.

== Description ==
Each vessel in the class has a 40-ton bollard pull and are powered by twin Garden Reach G7V diesel engines coupled to two propellers with a total output of 3920 bhp. They have four foam monitors installed for firefighting operations. The vessels have a speed of 15 knots and are also fitted with diving and salvage equipment. They carry an RCC (recompression chamber) and can render limited submarine rescue services.

External image
- Gaj class tugboat
- INS Matanga

== Ships in the class ==
Pennant No.	Name	Launched	Commissioned	Decommissioned	Notes
A-51	INS Gaj	September 1972	20 September 1973	14 August 1996	
A-53	INS Matanga	29 October 1977	2 April 1983	27 January 2017	

== See also ==
- Tugboats of the Indian Navy
