= Poshak-class barge =

The Poshak class of barge were a series of self-propelled aviation fuel carriers built by Mazagon Dock Limited of the Indian navy. The AVCAT tankers had a carrying capacity of 400 tonnes.

== Ships of the class ==
Barges in the class -
Name	commission
INS Poshak	3-July-1970
INS PuraK	5-June-1970

== See also ==
- INS Poshak - A fuel-carrying barge delivered to the Indian Navy in 2012.
