= INS Prema =

INS Prema is a fuel barge built by Goa Shipyard Limited for Indian Navy. Its yard no is 1145 and was delivered on 23/07/1988. The vessels IMO number is 8612201 and has dead weight of 400 tonnes.

== See also ==
- INS Pushpa
