= INS Panvel =

Retired Indian Naval Gunboat

Class overview
- Operators: India

General characteristics
- Type: Patrol boat
- Displacement: 91 long tons (92 t)
- Length: 29.9 m (98 ft 1 in)
- Beam: 4.6 m (15 ft 1 in)
- Draft: 1.5 m (4 ft 11 in)
- Propulsion: 2 × diesel engines (2,400 hp (1,800 kW) total)
- Speed: 18 knots (33 km/h; 21 mph)
- Range: 460 nmi (850 km; 530 mi) at 17 knots (31 km/h; 20 mph)
- Complement: 16 initially, 30 later
- Armament: 1 × Bofors 40 mm gun, 2 x KPV heavy machine guns, 1 x SPG-9 Recoilless Rifle

INS Panvel was a Pulicat-class patrol boat derived from a series of five watercraft of Russian origin (ex Poluchat class), which were in service of Indian Navy. The vessel was ordered in 1965 and delivered in 1967. Ships of the class were named after coastal cities in India, in this case, Panvel. INS Panvel took part in Indo-Pakistani war of 1971 as part of Task Force Alpha. The task force participated in an attack on Mongla and Khulna harbours.

== Service history ==
=== Task Force Alpha ===
The job assigned to Task Force Alpha was to undertake a maritime attack on port complex of Khulna and Mongla. Task Force Alpha was a maritime task force comprising two gunboats of Flower class, Padma and Palash, loaned from the West Bengal government, Chitrangada, a watercraft of the Border Security Force (BSF) and INS Panvel, a seaward defence boat as the task force's command ship. Panvel, owing to her two 40 mm Bofors guns, was the best armed of the task force. However, Panvel was a very small ship of the Pulicut class. The task force was operating directly under the orders of the Eastern Army Command at Kolkata and not the Eastern Naval Command. The force departed on the morning of 7 December 1971, from Hasnabad, a river port on the Indian side and travelled through Sunderbans delta. At midnight of 8/9 December, Task Force Alpha was at Akram Point at the mouth of the Pussur River, Panvel detected two medium-sized ships fleeing the warzone. The ships of this task force now turned northwards into the Pussur River. The task force reached Mongla after the Pakistan forces retreated and Mukti Bahini was in control of the area. The boarding parties of the task force accomplished their task. Chitrangada remained at Mongla for overseeing salvage operations, rendering assistance to local population and as rearguard.

As there was no sign of the enemy at Mongla, the ships Panvel, Palash and Padma sped towards Khulna which was 30 kilometres (19 mi) upstream and arrived there around 1100 hours on 10 December. The Indian Army's 41 Brigade, which was advancing in this area from the west, was locked in combat with the Pakistan Army's 107 Brigade. Task Force Alpha was ordered to launch a waterborne offensive on these Pakistani forces from their rear on the Rupsha River (a tributary of the Pussur), which lay east of Khulna, in order to weaken them. When the ships had begun attacking the opposing Razakar forces, Follland Gnat fighter jets of Indian Air Force (IAF) appeared on the scene. The Gnats failed to identify the Indian ships and fired at them. The rockets narrowly missed Panvel but Padma was hit. Palash also took a rocket hit and was in flames. Panvel started rescue efforts and, by the end of the day's action, picked up 14 crew members of Palash and Padma. After the IAF fighters disappeared, Panvel began bombarding the Pakistani forces. She destroyed every single fortification of enemy on either side of the Rupsha. Her Bofors gun rattled the town of Khulna for over an hour, destroying the shipyard, many government offices and other significant infrastructure which stood on the western bank. Panvel evaded the Gnats, beached and un-beached, raised smoke to appear as a stricken ship, abandoning ship and kept the force together, rescuing many, protecting herself from enemy fire and launching a counter offensive. For all these efforts the Army recommended Panvel's captain Cdr MNR Samant for the Maha Vir Chakra.

== See also ==
- Jija Bai-class patrol vessel
- 1971 Indo-Pakistan Naval War
