= Anand-class tugboat =

Service watercraft

The Anand class tugboats are a series of service watercraft built by Goa Shipyard Limited (earlier part of Mazagon Dock Limited, Bombay), for the Indian Navy. Tugs of this class have a 6-tonne bollard pull.

== Ships of the class ==
Yard no.	Name	Delivery	IMO number
1155	INS Anand	19-04-1991	8814823
1168	INS Atal	29-07-1991	

== Specification ==
- Gross Tonnage: 100 tonnes
- DWT: 13 tonnes

== See also ==
- Tugboats of the Indian Navy
