= Anjan-class tugboat =

Retired class of Indian Tugboats

Class overview
- Builders: Goa Shipyard Limited
- Operators: India
- Planned: 5
- Completed: 5

General characteristics
- Type: Tugboat
- Length: 28.5 m (93 ft 6 in)
- Beam: 9.5 m (31 ft 2 in)
- Draught: 2.8 m (9 ft 2 in)
- Propulsion: 2 × V-12 cylinder Cummins KTA38M2 engines
- Capacity: 300 cubic metres dredged material

The Anjan-class tugboats were a series of 25-tonne bollard pull tugboat built by Goa Shipyard Limited, earlier part of Mazagon Dock Limited, for the Indian navy.

These tugboats are powered by Cummins engines generating 1200 HP continuous duty at 1800 RPM. These tugboats feature Stainless steel propellers.

== Boats in the class ==
| Yard number | Name | Delivery date | Commissioning date | IMO number |
|---|---|---|---|---|
| 1028 | INS Anjan | 9 October 1973 | 16 November 1973 | |
| 1029 | INS Angad | 28 February 1974 | 3 March 1974 | |
| 1030 | INS Anup | 29 June 1974 | 29 June 1974 | |
| 1031 | INS Athak | 31 October 1974 | 30 October 1974 | 7344144 |
| 1032 | INS Ajral | 31 October 1974 | 30 October 1974 | 7344156 |

== See also ==
- Bhim-class tugboat
- Arga-class tugboat
- Madan Singh-class tugboat
