= INS Amba =

History

India
- Name: INS Amba
- Namesake: Mango
- Builder: Nikolayev, USSR
- Commissioned: 28 December 1968
- Decommissioned: July 2006

General characteristics
- Type: Submarine tender
- Displacement: 6,750 t (6,643 long tons) standard; 9,650 t (9,498 long tons) full load
- Length: 141 m (462 ft 7 in)
- Beam: 17.6 m (57 ft 9 in)
- Draught: 7 m (23 ft 0 in)
- Propulsion: Diesel-electric, 2 shafts, 8,000 shp (5,966 kW)
- Speed: 17 knots (31 km/h; 20 mph)
- Range: 21,000 mi (34,000 km) at 10 kn (19 km/h; 12 mph)
- Complement: 400
- Armament: 4 × 76 mm guns
- Aviation facilities: Helicopter landing pad

INS Amba (A54) was the only submarine tender ship in service with the Indian Navy. It is a modified Soviet Ugra-class design built to Indian specifications in Nikolayev (the present-day Mykolaiv in Ukraine) in 1968. Deviations from the standard Ugra design include four 76 mm guns instead of the 57 mm ones mounted on Soviet units.

On 26 May 2001 a fire broke out in the laundry section of Amba during a routine refit at the Cochin Shipyard, suffocating two washermen. Amba was decommissioned from service in July 2006.
