= Astravahini-class torpedo recovery vessel =

Indian naval auxiliary watercraft

External image
- Astravahini class
- A-72 TRV

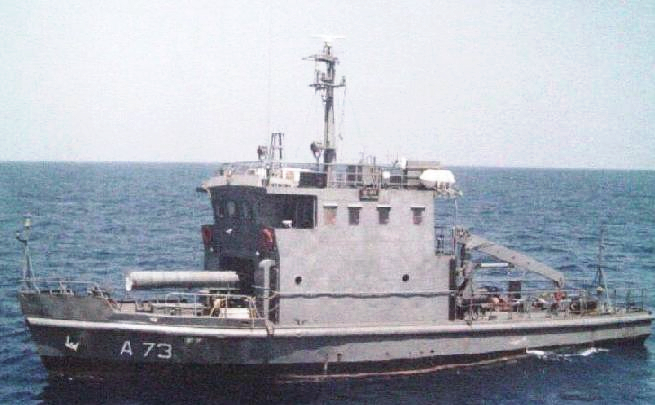
Astravahini-class torpedo recovery vessel A73.

The Astravahini class of torpedo recovery vessels are a series of naval auxiliary watercraft built by Goa Shipyard Limited and P.S. & Company for the Indian Navy. They are intended to recover practice torpedoes and mines, fired and laid by ships, submarines and aircraft. The vessels can stow two full-sized torpedoes on deck and two on a recovery ramp.

The vessel A72 sank on 6 November 2014 during a routine exercise near Visakhapatnam after taking on water, with one sailor dead and four missing.

== Ships in the class ==
Ships in the class
Yard no	IMO number	Pennant no	Commission	Decommission	Builder	Notes
1083	7804077	A71	15 September 1982	25 March 2005	GSL	Torpedo Recovery Vessel
1084	7804089	A72	23 February 1983	Sunk 6 November 2014	GSL	Torpedo Recovery Vessel
		A73	5 November 1984	16 July 2015	P. S. & Company	Torpedo Launch and Recovery Vessel

== Specification (A71 & A72) ==
- Displacement: 110 tonnes
- Speed: 11 knots
- Dimension: 28.5 X 6.1 X 1.4 meters
- Engine: 2 Kirloskar MAN 12 cyl. diesels, 2 props. 720 bhp
- Crew: 13 total

== See also ==
- List of active Indian Navy ships
- INS Astradharani, a catamaran-hulled torpedo recovery vessel that replaced the Astravahini class
