= INS Khukri (P49) =

1986 Khukri-class corvette of the Indian Navy

Coordinates: 20.71914°N 70.98977°E

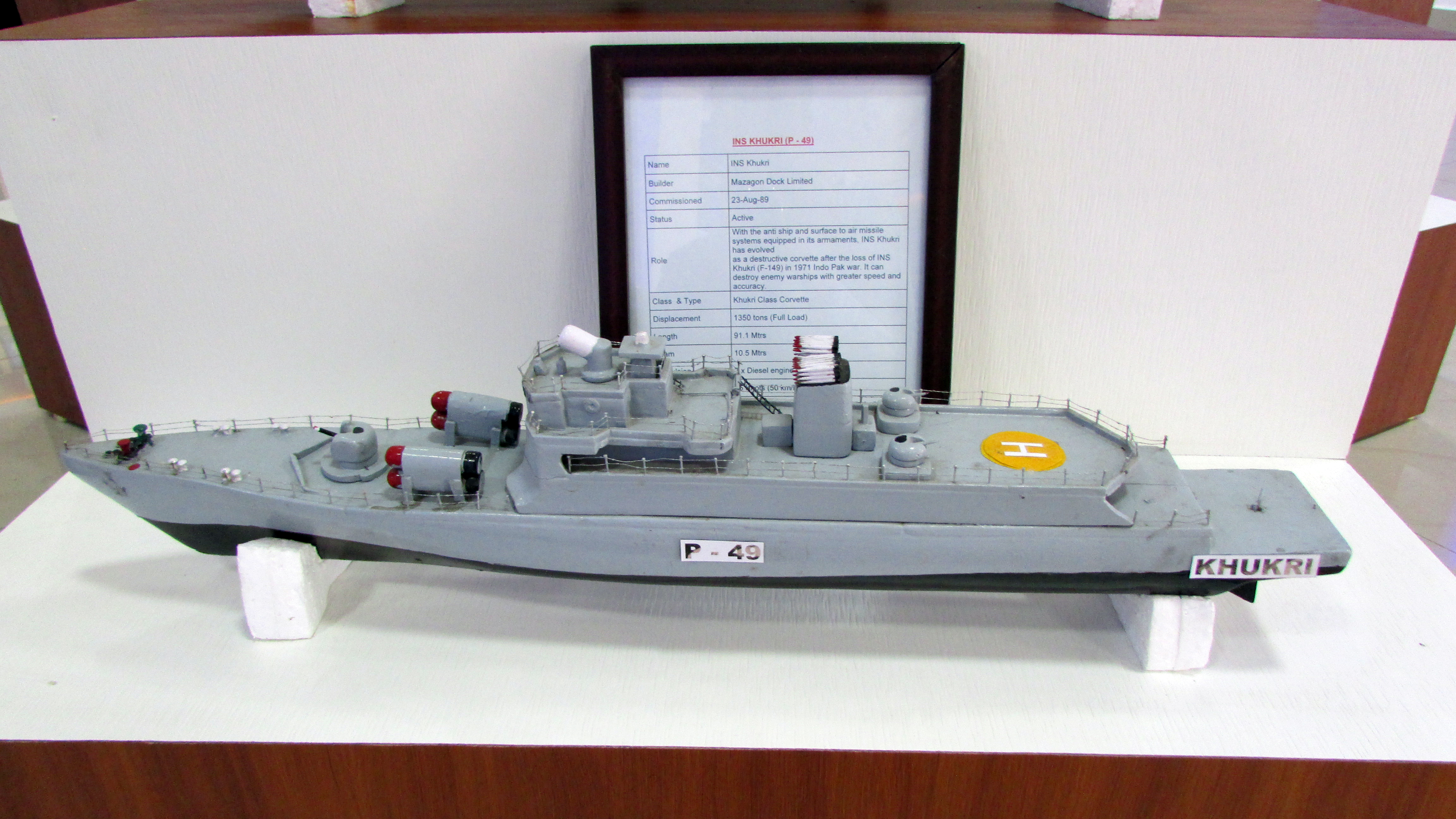
- a scale model in Yodhasthal Museum

History
- Name: INS Khukri
- Namesake: Khukri
- Builder: Mazagon Dock Limited
- Laid down: 27 September 1985
- Launched: 3 December 1986
- Commissioned: 23 August 1989
- Decommissioned: 23 December 2021
- Identification: Pennant number: P49
- Status: Museum ship in Diu, India

General characteristics
- Class & type: Khukri-class corvette
- Displacement: 1350 tons (full load)
- Length: 91.1 metres
- Beam: 10.5 metres
- Draught: 4.5 metres
- Propulsion: 2 diesel engines with 14,400hp; 2 shafts
- Speed: 25 knots (50 km/h)
- Range: 4,000 nmi (7,400 km) at 16 knots (30 km/h)
- Complement: 79 (incl. 10 officers)
- Sensors & processing systems: MR 352 Pozitiv-E radar; Garpun-Bal radar; Bharat 1245 navigation radar
- Armament: 4 × P-20M (SS-N-2D) AShMs; 2 × Strela-2M (SA-N-5) SAM; 1 × AK–176 76mm gun; 2 × 30mm AK-630 guns
- Aircraft carried: 1 helicopter (HAL Chetak)

INS Khukri was the lead vessel of her class of corvettes, in service with the Indian Navy. The ship was named after INS Khukri, the only Indian Navy ship to be ever lost in combat. It was lost during the 1971 Indo-Pak war.

Khukri was laid down on 27 September 1985 at Mazagon Dock Limited, launched on 3 December 1986 and commissioned on 23 August 1989.

In 2022, it was stated to be developed into a museum ship and placed at INS Khukri Memorial, Diu. On the 26th of January 2022, the warship was formally handed over to the administration of Diu district to be converted into a memorial.

== Service history ==
Khukri the lead ship of the class was decommissioned after 32 years of service on 23 December, 2021. During her service, the ship was commanded by 28 commanding officers and traversed a distance of over 6,44,897 nautical miles, which is equivalent to navigating around the world 30 times.
