= INS Kirpan (P44) =

Indian Navy corvette commissioned in 1991

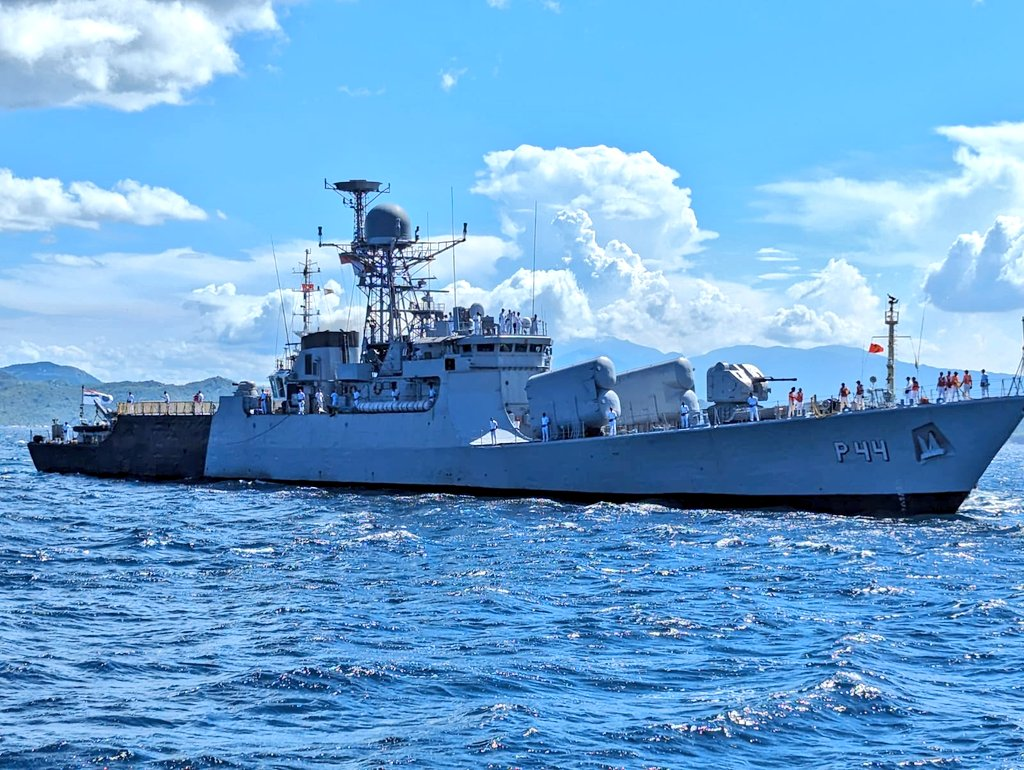
- Kirpan (P44) entering Cam Ranh International Port, Vietnam
- Name: INS Kirpan
- Namesake: Ceremonial dagger worn by Khalsa Sikhs
- Builder: Garden Reach Shipbuilders and Engineers
- Laid down: 15 November 1985
- Launched: 16 August 1988
- Commissioned: 12 January 1991
- Decommissioned: 22 July 2023
- Identification: Pennant number: P44
- Status: Decommissioned & handed over to the Vietnamese Navy

History

Vietnam
- Acquired: 22 July 2023
- Identification: HQ-26

General characteristics
- Class & type: Khukri-class corvette
- Displacement: 1350 tons (full load)
- Length: 91.1 metres
- Beam: 10.5 metres
- Draught: 4.5 metres
- Propulsion: 2 diesel engines with 14,400hp; 2 shafts
- Speed: 25 knots (50 km/h)
- Range: 4,000 nmi (7,400 km) at 16 knots (30 km/h)
- Complement: 79 (incl. 10 officers)
- Sensors & processing systems: MR 352 Pozitiv-E radar; Garpun-Bal radar; Bharat 1245 navigation radar
- Armament: 4 × P-20M (SS-N-2D) AShMs; 2 × Strela-2M (SA-N-5) SAM; 1 × AK–176 76mm gun; 2 × 30mm AK-630 guns
- Aircraft carried: 1 helicopter (HAL Chetak)

INS Kirpan is the name of a Khukri-class corvette formerly commissioned by the Indian Navy. It was recently decommissioned and handed over to Vietnam People's Navy in a ceremony presided over by Adm. R. Hari Kumar and Rear Adm. Pham Manh Hung, Deputy Commander-in-Chief and Chief of Staff, Vietnam People's Navy.

== History ==
It is the first active warship that India has ever gifted to another country, that is the Vietnam People's Navy, which will use it in the future with as Ship 26. The warship was gifted to Vietnam after a visit by Vietnam's Defence Minister Gen Phan Van Giang in June, 2023.

It is another in a long list of warships gifted by India to other countries. The indigenously built missile corvette INS Kirpan entered Cam Ranh International Port on July 8 after sailing out of Visakhapatnam on 29 June 2023 and was to be officially handed over to Vietnamese People’s Navy by month end.

Kirpan was transferred to Vietnam People's Navy and was decommissioned from Indian Navy service on 22 July 2023 after 32 years of service.

It is the namesake of INS Kirpan that was a Type 14 Blackwood-class frigate commissioned in 1959 into the Indian Navy, that participated in 1971 India-Pakistan War and was almost sunk by PNS Hangor.
