= HMS Littleham =

Minesweeper of the Royal Navy

History

United Kingdom
- Name: HMS Littleham
- Namesake: Littleham
- Builder: Brooke Marine
- Launched: 4 April 1954
- Completed: 21 October 1954
- Fate: Transferred to India, 15 June 1955.
- Notes: Pennant number(s): M2707 / IMS44

India
- Name: INS Bassein
- Namesake: Bassein
- Acquired: 15 June 1955
- Stricken: 1994

General characteristics
- Class & type: Ham-class minesweeper
- Displacement: 120 tons standard; 164 tons full
- Length: 106 ft 6 in (32.46 m)
- Beam: 22 ft (6.7 m)
- Draught: 5 ft 9 in (1.75 m)
- Propulsion: 2 shaft Paxman 12YHAXM diesels, 1,100 bhp (820 kW)
- Speed: 14 knots (26 km/h)
- Complement: 2 officers, 13 ratings
- Armament: 1 × Bofors 40 mm L/60 gun / 20 mm Oerlikon gun

HMS Littleham was one of 93 ships of the Ham class of inshore minesweepers.

Their names were all chosen from villages ending in -ham. The minesweeper was named after Littleham in Devon.
