= Ugra-class submarine tender =

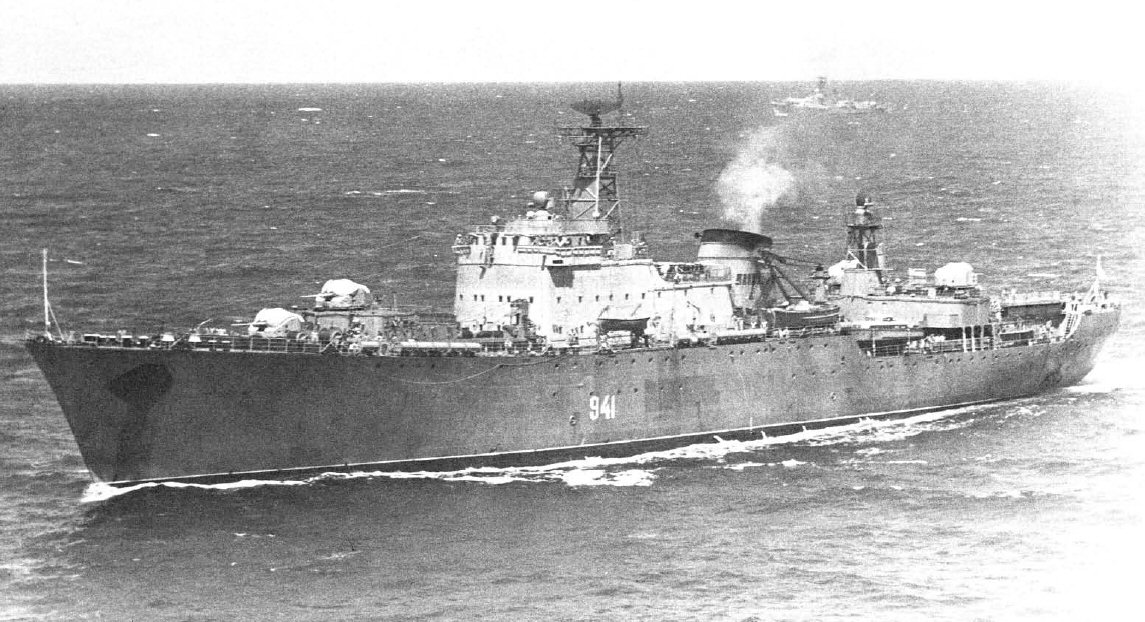
- An Ugra-class ship in the 1960s

Class overview
- Name: Ugra class (Project 1886)
- Builders: Nikolayev Shipyard
- Operators: Soviet Navy; Russian Navy; Indian Navy
- Preceded by: Don class
- Subclasses: Borodino class; INS Amba
- Completed: 10
- Retired: 10

General characteristics For Ugra class
- Type: Submarine tender
- Displacement: 6,780 t (6,670 long tons) standard; 9,950 t (9,790 long tons) full load
- Length: 145.0 m (475 ft 9 in)
- Beam: 17.7 m (58 ft 1 in)
- Draught: 6.4 m (21 ft 0 in)
- Propulsion: 2-shaft, 4 diesel engines, 6,000 kW (8,000 bhp)
- Speed: 17 knots (31 km/h; 20 mph)
- Range: 21,000 nmi (39,000 km; 24,000 mi) at 10 kn (19 km/h; 12 mph)
- Complement: 450
- Sensors & processing systems: 2 × Muff Cob fire control radar; 1 × Strut Curve air search radar; 1–3 × Don-2 navigation/surface search radar
- Electronic warfare & decoys: 4 × Watch Dog EW
- Armament: 4 x twin 57 mm/80 anti-aircraft guns; 16 x Strela 2 surface-to-air missiles
- Aircraft carried: 1 × Ka-25 "Hormone-C" helicopter
- Aviation facilities: Helicopter pad

The Ugra class was the NATO reporting name for a group of seven submarine tenders built for the Soviet Navy in the late 1960s. The Soviet designation was Project 1886. One further ship was built for the Indian Navy to a modified design. The ships were intended to provide afloat support for Soviet submarines, including supplies, water, torpedoes, fuel, and battery charging; minimal repair facilities, and were often employed as flagships/command ships for submarine squadrons. A subclass of two ships, the Borodino class, were constructed for use as training ships and lacked missiles and the ability to support submarines. Instead, the Borodino class had classrooms and training facilities.

== Design and description ==
The Ugra class were submarine tenders of the Soviet Navy designed to support eight to twelve submarines at sea, providing them with supplies, fresh water, fuel, torpedoes and repair services. They were improved versions of the preceding Don class. The class, named Project 1886 by the Soviets, designated the type of ship as Russian: Plavuchaya Baza meaning "Floating Base". The Ugra class had extensive command and control facilities for fleet/task force commanders and were often used as flagships.

Submarine tenders of the Ugra class measured 145.0 metres (475 ft 9 in) long overall with a beam of 17.7 m (58 ft 1 in) and a draught of 6.4 m (21 ft 0 in). They had a standard displacement of 6,780 tonnes (6,670 long tons) and displaced 9,950 t (9,790 long tons) at full load. On most of the vessels, the superstructure stretched aft to the funnel, which was larger than that found on the Don class and the Ugra class also had a shorter funnel. Along the hull, the ships had mooring points every 30 m (100 ft) and baggage ports for loading and unloading coastal craft and submarines. All of the ships had one 10-tonne capable crane and two 5-ton capable cranes. Within the ships were workshops capable of providing repair services.

The vessels were powered by a diesel-electric system composed of four Kolomna 2D 42 diesel engines and two electric motors turning two shafts, creating 6,000 kilowatts (8,000 bhp). This gave the submarine tenders a maximum speed of 17 knots (31 km/h; 20 mph) and a range of 21,000 nautical miles (39,000 km; 24,000 mi) at 10 knots (19 km/h; 12 mph). They had a complement of 450 officers and ratings.

The Ugra class were armed with two quad launchers for sixteen 9K32 Strela-2 (NATO reporting name: SA-N-5 "Grail") surface-to-air missiles and four twin-mounted 57-millimetre (2.2 in)/80 anti-aircraft guns. (Note: /80 describes the gun's calibre and denotes the length of the gun. This means that the length of the gun barrel is 80 times the bore diameter.) The ships mounted two "Muff Cob" fire control radars, one "Strut Curve" air/surface search radar and between one and three "Don-2 navigational radar. They were also equipped with four "Watch Dog" electronic warfare/jamming radar, two "Square Head" and one "High Pole B" identification friend or foe antenna. Two ships, Ivan Kucherenko and Volga, were equipped with lattice masts for "Vee Cone" HF communications antenna. All of the ships had a small helicopter pad aft but only Ivan Kolyshkin had a hangar installed capable of supporting a Kamov Ka-25 "Hormone-C" helicopter.

== Ships ==
Seven ships were built for the Soviet Navy in Nikolayev.

Construction data
Name	Builder	Launched	Commissioned	Decommissioned	Notes
Ivan Kolyshkin	Black Sea Shipyard, Nikolayev, Soviet Union	30 March 1972	27 December 1972	1994	
Ivan Kucherenko	Black Sea Shipyard, Nikolayev, Soviet Union	28 November 1965	30 December 1966	1994	
Ivan Vakhrameev	Black Sea Shipyard, Nikolayev, Soviet Union	5 November 1968	30 August 1969	1994	
Volga	Black Sea Shipyard, Nikolayev, Soviet Union	30 December 1966	30 May 1968	2001	
Tobol	Black Sea Shipyard, Nikolayev, Soviet Union	31 September 1963	25 September 1965	1994	
Vladimir Yegorov	Black Sea Shipyard, Nikolayev, Soviet Union	29 September 1962	27 December 1963	1991	
Lena	Black Sea Shipyard, Nikolayev, Soviet Union	28 April 1963	29 December 1964	1991	

== Export ==
One ship of the class was constructed for the Indian Navy. The ship was identical to the Soviet vessels except for armament and radars. Named INS Amba, the ship was commissioned on 28 December 1968 and given the pennant number A 54. Amba was armed with two 76.2 mm (3.00 in) anti-aircraft guns and equipped with one "Slim Net", two "Hawk Screech" and one "Don-2" radars. Amba was decommissioned in 2006.

Construction data
Name	Builder	Launched	Commissioned	Decommissioned	Notes
INS Amba	Black Sea Shipyard, Nikolayev, Soviet Union		28 December 1968	July 2006	

== Borodino-class training ships ==
Two ships were completed to a modified (Project 1886U, Russian: 1886У) design as training ships. Designated Russian: Uchebnoye Sudo meaning "training ship", they were named Borodino and Gangut. Instead of workshops and storerooms they had increased accommodation and training facilities. They lacked the missile air defence and no helicopter facilities but had an enlarged aft deckhouse that incorporated a navigation training space with additional navigator training positions. Both underwent a refit in Yugoslavia in 1989. They were scrapped in the late 1990s.

Construction data
Name	Builder	Launched	Commissioned	Decommissioned	Notes
Borodino	Black Sea Shipyard, Nikolayev, Soviet Union	30 January 1970	16 January 1971	1996	
Gangut	Black Sea Shipyard, Nikolayev, Soviet Union	30 December 1970	10 October 1971	1998	

== See also ==
- List of ships of the Soviet Navy
- List of ships of Russia by project number
