= Bahadur-class tugboat =

Indian Tugboat class

The Bahadur class tugboats were a series of service watercraft built by Goa Shipyard Limited, for the Indian Navy. They have a rated bollard pull of 10 tonnes.

== Ships of the class ==
Yard no	Name	Delivery date	IMO number
1130	INS Bahadur	30-03-1988	8824842
1154	INS Ananta	26-08-1988	
1167	INS Aja	21-02-1992	

== Specification ==
- Gross tonnage: 100 tonnes
- DWT: 17 tonnes

== See also ==
- Tugboats of the Indian Navy
