= GSL-class ferry =

Indian ferries

GSL class of personnel ferries are series of six service craft built by state owned Goa Shipyard Limited, Vasco for Indian Navy. They are general purpose utility auxiliary watercraft used for transportation of personnel in harbour. The vessels stationed at Mumbai harbour are planned to be succeeded by Manoram class ferry.

== List of vessels ==
Name	Home-port	Date of commissioning
Manohar	Mumbai	24 February 1986
Modak	Mumbai	27 March 1986-sold for Scrap
Mangal	Mumbai	27 May 1986
Madhur	Mumbai	23 July 1986
Manorama		17 December 1986
Manjula	Mumbai	31 May 1988

== Specifications ==
- Displacement: 175 Tonnes
- Speed: 11 knots
- Dimensions: 28.10 m * 7.62 m * 1.47 m
- Power: 2 diesel engines
- Propulsion: 2 propellers
- Crew: 6 sailors
- Capacity: 156 seated passengers

== See also ==
- Manoram class ferry
- Shalimar class ferry
