= INS Pushpa =

INS Pushpa is an oil barge built by Goa Shipyard (yard number 1144) for the Indian Navy. The ship was delivered on 29 September 1989. The vessel's IMO number is 8612213 and has a deadweight of 732 tonnes.

== See also ==
- INS Prema
