= INS Charag =

Chamak-class missile boat of the Indian Navy

History

Indian Navy
- Name: INS Charag
- Commissioned: 17 October 1977
- Decommissioned: 17 May 1996

General characteristics
- Class & type: Chamak class missile boat
- Displacement: 245 tons (full load)
- Length: 38.6 meters
- Beam: 7.6 meters
- Speed: 37+ knots
- Complement: 30
- Armament: 4 × SS-N-2A Styx AShM; 1 × SA-N-5 SAM; 2 × AK-230 30mm guns

INS Charag (K97) (literally: Lamp) was a Chamak class missile boat of the Indian Navy.
