= HMS Hildersham =

Minesweeper of the Royal Navy

History

United Kingdom
- Name: HMS Hildersham
- Namesake: Hildersham
- Builder: Vosper
- Launched: 5 February 1954
- Completed: 9 November 1954
- Fate: transferred to India, 1955

India
- Name: INS Bimlipatan
- Namesake: Bimlipatan
- Acquired: 1955
- Stricken: 1994

General characteristics
- Class & type: Ham-class minesweeper
- Displacement: 120 tons standard; 164 tons full
- Length: 106 ft 6 in (32.46 m)
- Beam: 22 ft (6.7 m)
- Draught: 5 ft 9 in (1.75 m)
- Propulsion: 2 shaft Paxman 12YHAXM diesels, 1,100 bhp (820 kW)
- Speed: 14 knots (26 km/h)
- Complement: 2 officers, 13 ratings
- Armament: 1 × Bofors 40 mm L/60 gun / 20 mm Oerlikon gun
- Notes: Pennant number(s): M2705 / IMS42

HMS Hildersham was one of 93 ships of the Ham class of inshore minesweepers.

Their names were all chosen from villages ending in -ham. The minesweeper was named after Hildersham in Cambridgeshire.
