= Khukri-class corvette =

Indian Navy ship class

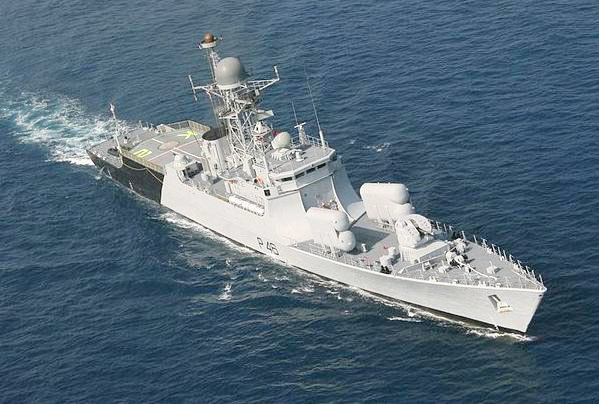
- INS Kuthar

Class overview
- Name: Khukri class
- Builders: Mazagon Dock Limited; Garden Reach Shipbuilders and Engineers
- Operators: Indian Navy; Vietnam People's Navy
- Preceded by: Veer class
- Succeeded by: Kora class
- Subclasses: Kora class
- In commission: 1989–present
- Planned: 4
- Completed: 4
- Active: 2 Indian Navy; 1 Vietnam People's Navy
- Retired: 1
- Preserved: 1

General characteristics
- Type: Corvette
- Displacement: 1,423 short tons (1,291 t) (full load)
- Length: 91.1 m (299 ft)
- Beam: 10.5 m (34 ft)
- Draught: 4 m (13 ft)
- Propulsion: 2 × SEMT Pielstick/Kirloskar 18 PA6V 280 diesel engines (14,400 PS; 10,600 kW); 2 shafts
- Speed: 24 kn (44 km/h; 28 mph)
- Range: 4,000 nmi (7,400 km; 4,600 mi) at 16 kn (30 km/h; 18 mph)
- Complement: 112 including 12 officers
- Sensors & processing systems: MR-352 (NATO: Cross Dome) E/F-band air search radar; Granit Garpun B (NATO: Plank Shave) I-band air and surface search radar; MR-123 (NATO: Bass Tilt) H/I-band fire control radar; BEL 1245 I-band navigation radar
- Electronic warfare & decoys: BEL Ajanta P electronic support measures; 2 × PK-16 chaff launchers; NPOL towed torpedo decoy
- Armament: 4 × P-15 Termit (NATO: SS-N-2D Mod 1 Styx) missile launchers; SA-N-5 Grail launcher for air defence missiles; 1 × AK-176 76 mm 60-cal main gun; 2 × AK-630 30 mm gun
- Aircraft carried: 1 × HAL Chetak or HAL Dhruv

The Khukri-class corvette, also known as Project 25, is a class of corvettes intended to replace the ageing Petya II-class corvettes of the Indian Navy.

The first two were ordered in December 1983 and the remaining in 1985. Around 65% of the ship contains indigenous content. The diesel engines were assembled in India, under license by Kirloskar Group.

Four ships of the class were built. As of July 2023, two ships remain in service in the Indian Navy, and a third one has been donated to the Vietnam People's Navy.

== Service history ==
Khukri the lead ship of the class was decommissioned after 32 years of service on 23 December 2021. She has since been preserved as a museum ship in Diu, India.

During a meeting between the defence minister's of India and Vietnam, India decided to gift the Kirpan to the Vietnam People's Navy.

Kirpan was transferred to Vietnam People's Navy and was decommissioned from Indian Navy service on 22 July 2023.

== Ships of the class ==
Name	Pennant	Builder	Laid down	Launched	Commissioned	Decommissioned	Status
Indian Navy
Khukri	P49	Mazagon Dock	27 September 1985	3 December 1986	23 August 1989	23 December 2021	Converted into a Museum at Diu
Kuthar	P46	Mazagon Dock	13 September 1986	15 April 1989	7 June 1990		Active
Kirpan	P44	GRSE	15 November 1985	16 August 1988	12 January 1991	22 July 2023	Transferred to Vietnam People's Navy
Khanjar	P47	GRSE	15 November 1985	16 August 1988	22 October 1991		Active
Vietnam People's Navy
Ship 26	26	GRSE	15 November 1985	16 August 1988	22 July 2023		Erstwhile Kirpan

== See also ==
- List of active Indian Navy ships
