= INS Chapal =

Coordinates: 14°48′51.7″N 74°07′37.4″E

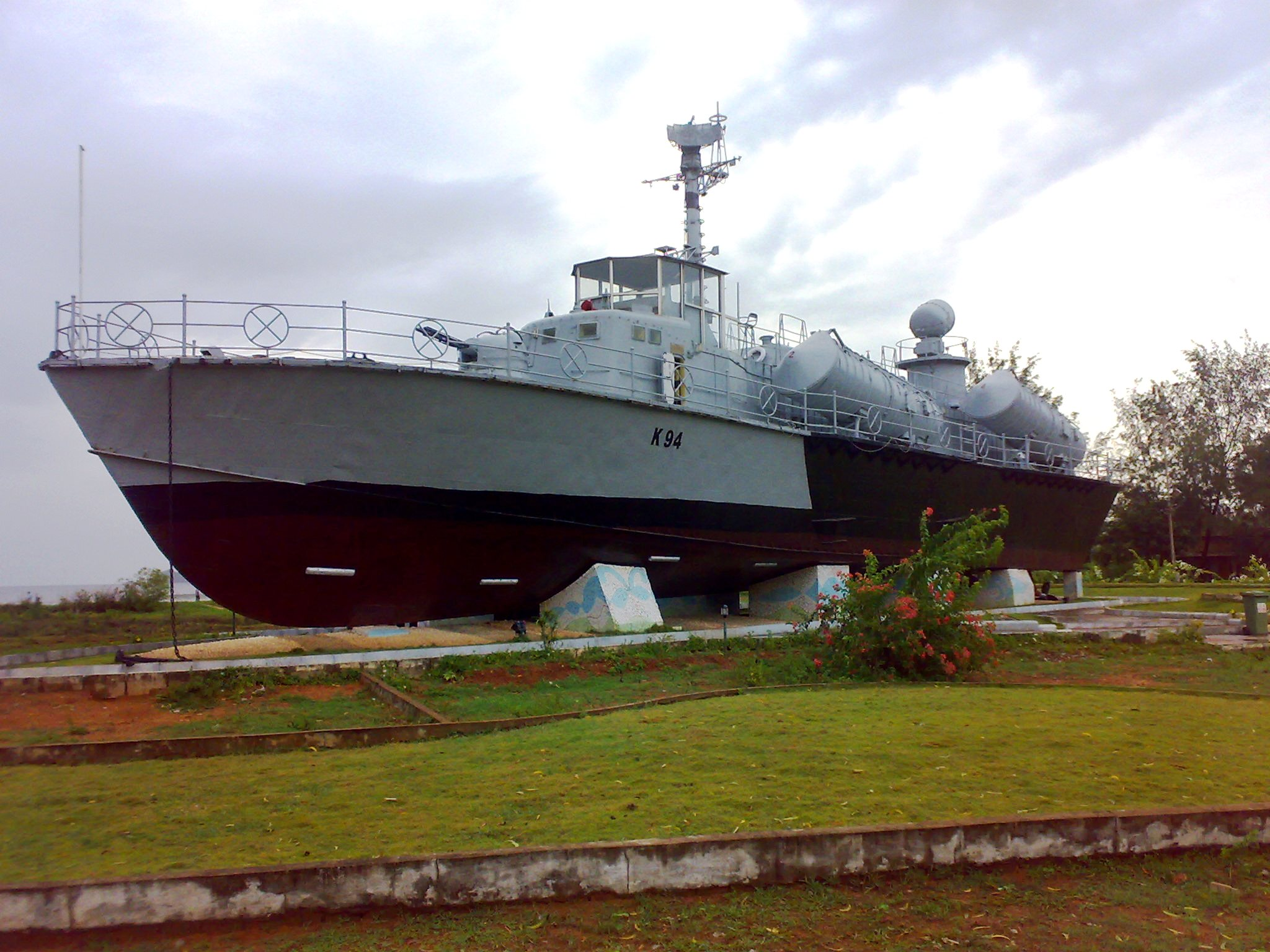
- Preserved at Rabindranath Tagore Beach.

History

India
- Name: INS Chapal
- Commissioned: 4 November 1976
- Decommissioned: 5 May 2005
- Fate: Museum ship on Rabindranath Tagore Beach, Karwar

General characteristics
- Class & type: Chamak class missile boat
- Displacement: 245 tons (full load)
- Length: 38.6 meters
- Beam: 7.6 meters
- Speed: 37+ knots
- Complement: 30
- Armament: 4 × SS-N-2A Styx AShM; 1 × SA-N-5 SAM; 2 × AK-230 30mm guns

INS Chapal (K94) was a Chamak class missile boat of the Indian Navy.

It is now a museum ship on Rabindranath Tagore Beach in Karwar, Karnataka.

This warship is now positioned on a special concrete platform at Rabindranath Tagore beach in Karwar city, Karnataka state, India.

Mannequins dressed-up as captain, sailors, doctors, etc., are there inside the Museum. Replicas of the missiles are also displayed inside the Warship Museum.
