= Seaward-class defense boats =

Large patrol craft

Class overview
- Name: Seaward class
- Builders: Garden Reach Shipbuilders and Engineers
- Operators: Indian Navy (former); National Coast Guard of Mauritius
- Preceded by: Pulicat class
- Succeeded by: Trinkat class
- Completed: 7
- Retired: 7

General characteristics
- Type: Large Patrol Craft
- Displacement: 210 tons full load
- Length: 37.5 m (123 ft)
- Propulsion: 2 × diesel motors with 6,820 hp; 2 shafts
- Speed: 30 kn (56 km/h; 35 mph)
- Range: 5,800 nmi (10,700 km; 6,700 mi) at 15 kn (28 km/h; 17 mph)
- Complement: 32
- Sensors & processing systems: BEL 1245 surface radar
- Armament: 2 × Bofors 40mm/60 gun; 1 × 7.62 mm MG; 18 MK 7, 10 MK 12 depth charges

The Seaward-class defence boats are large patrol craft designed by Mazagon Dock Limited (MDL) and built by Garden Reach Shipbuilders and Engineers (GRSE) for the Indian Navy. All of these vessels have been decommissioned, due to the large maintenance overhead they require.

== Midlife refits ==
The ships of this class were built with low strength mild steel and thin plates, and consequently had low corrosion tolerance. As such adhering to prescribed docking intervals was essential.

INS Seaward (T54) was commissioned in September 1982. Its medium refit was due in March 1988 and its long refit in April 1992. Ignoring the vulnerability to corrosion of this ship, the medium refit was delayed by over three years and was carried out from July 1991 to April 1992. As a result, the long refit could not be planned. However, another short refit including the replacement of the engines was taken up in December 1993. The short refit was converted into a medium refit in February 1994. While carrying out repairs, extensive damage to the hull below the waterline was noticed in March 1994. The medium refit was extended to May 1996 because the engines and other materials procured for this ship were used for carrying out ongoing repairs on another, similar, ship (SDBT-55).

== Ships ==
Name	Pennant	Builder	Commissioned	Decommissioned	Status
INS Seaward	T-54	GRSE	September 1982	20 Jan 2006	Sunk to be made into an artificial reef
INS Seawater	T-55	GRSE		2008-2009	Inactive
INS Seawind	T-56	GRSE		2008-2009	Inactive
INS Seawaves	T-57	GRSE		24 August 2006	Inactive
INS Seastorm	T-58	GRSE		20 July 2010	Inactive
INS Seasand	T-59	GRSE		7 September 2009	Inactive
INS Searock	T-60	GRSE		7 September 2009	Inactive
CGS Guardian	T-61	GRSE			April 1993 gifted to Mauritius. In service
