= Chamak-class missile boat =

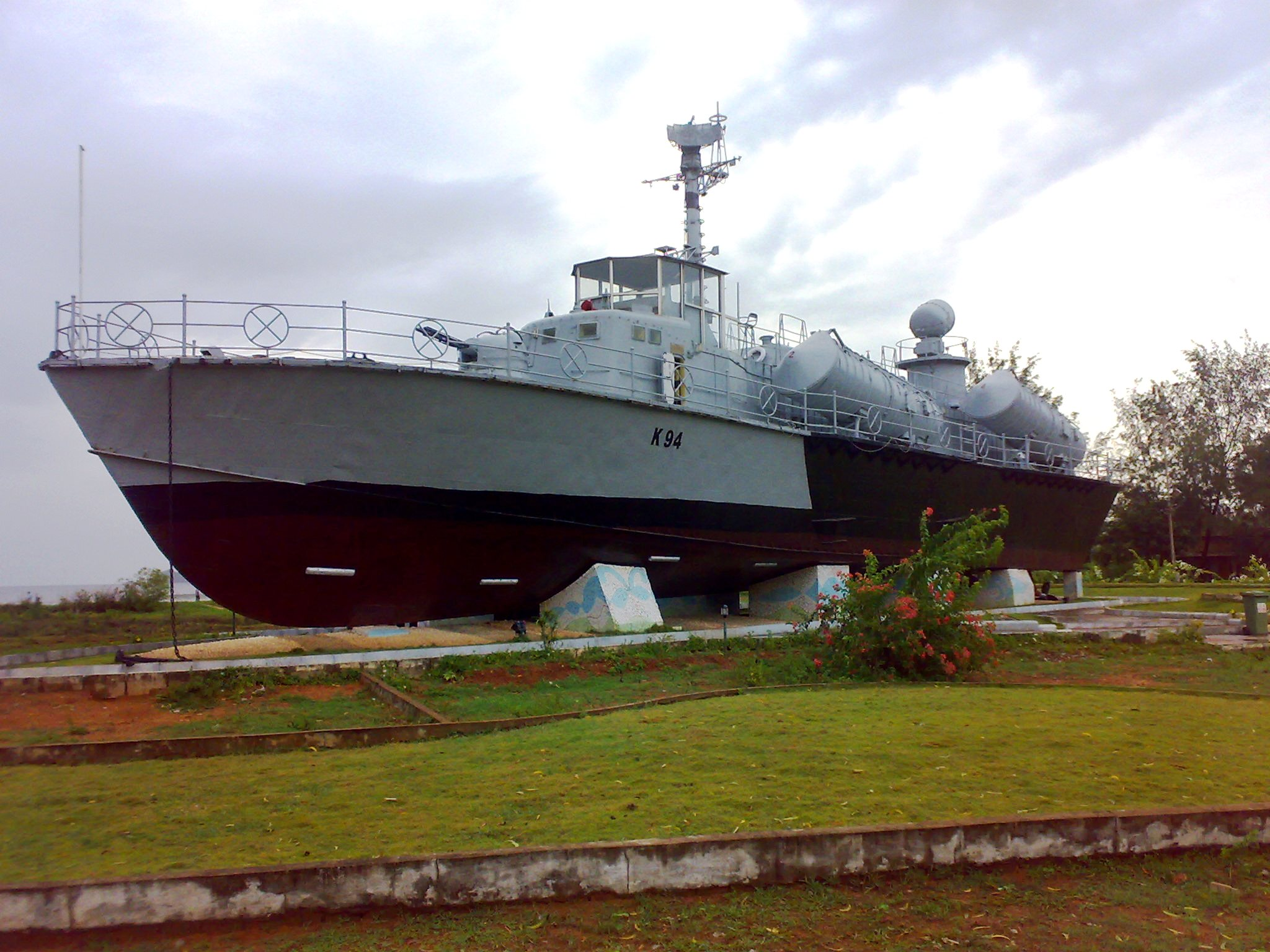
- INS Chapal (K94)

Class overview
- Name: Chamak class
- Operators: Indian Navy
- Preceded by: Vidyut class
- Succeeded by: Veer class
- Planned: 8
- Retired: 8
- Preserved: 4

General characteristics
- Type: Fast attack craft
- Displacement: 245 tons (full load)
- Length: 38.6 m (127 ft)
- Beam: 7.6 m (25 ft)
- Speed: 37 knots (69 km/h)+
- Complement: 30
- Armament: 4 × SS-N-2A Styx anti-ship missiles; 1 × SA-N-5 SAM; 2 × AK-230 30mm guns

The Chamak-class missile boats (NATO code: Osa II class) of the Indian Navy were an Indian variant of the Soviet Project 205 Moskit.

The Osa-II Class missile boats formed the 25th Missile Vessel (K25) Squadron, also known as the Killers, based at Vizag. Osa is the Russian word for Wasp. All eight missile boats have been decommissioned from service.

== Ships of the class ==
Name	Pennant	Commissioned	Decommissioned	Fate	Notes
Prachand	K90	17 February 1976	29 December 1999		
Pralaya	K91	17 February 1976	8 June 2001		
Pratap	K92	17 February 1976	17 May 1996		
Prabal	K93	17 February 1976	29 December 1999	Preserved at EsselWorld, Gorai, Maharashtra	Free Entry to visitors of the amusement park
Chapal	K94	4 November 1976	5 May 2005	Preserved at Karwar, Karnataka	
Chamak	K95	4 November 1976	5 May 2005	Preserved at NDA, Khadkavasla	
Chatak	K96	9 February 1977	5 May 2005	Preserved at SNC HQ, Kochi. The propeller has been gifted to Department of Ship Technology, CUSAT.	
Charag	K97	17 October 1977	17 May 1996		
