= Ajay-class patrol vessel =

India's First indigenously built patrol vessel class

Class overview
- Name: Ajay class
- Builders: Garden Reach Shipbuilders & Engineers
- Operators: Indian Navy; Bangladesh Navy; Mauritius Navy/Coast Guard
- Succeeded by: Pulicat class
- Completed: 6
- Retired: 6

General characteristics
- Type: Patrol vessel
- Displacement: 120 tons (standard); 151 tons (full)
- Length: 35.7 m (117 ft 2 in)
- Beam: 6.1 m (20 ft 0 in)
- Draught: 1.9 m (6 ft 3 in)
- Propulsion: 2 Paxman YHAXM diesel engines; 1,000 hp (750 kW); 2 shafts
- Speed: 18 knots (33 km/h; 21 mph)
- Range: 500 nmi (930 km; 580 mi) at 12 knots (22 km/h; 14 mph)
- Complement: 35
- Armament: 1 x Bofors 40 mm gun; 4 x GIAT 20 mm F2 AA gun

The Ajay-class patrol vessels were built by Garden Reach Shipbuilders & Engineers in the 1960s. The lead vessel, INS Ajay was the first warship built in Independent India. They were sometimes viewed as a variant of the Ford-class seaward defence boats. Two were transferred to the Bangladesh Navy and one to Mauritius; later versions could have different armament

== Ships ==
Name	Builder	Commissioned	Fate	Comments
Ajay	GRSE	1961	Transferred to Bangladesh Navy on 26 July 1974	Transferred to the Bangladesh Navy on 26 July 1974, served as BNS Surma and was eventually decommissioned
Amar	GRSE	11 July 1969	Decommissioned March 1974	Transferred to Mauritius and commissioned as MNS Amar on 3 April 1974. She was later re-commissioned in the Mauritius Coast Guard as CGS Amar on 24 July 1987. She served as Mauritius's only naval vessel for over two decades, and was decommissioned on 19 March 1998.
Ajit	GRSE	9 December 1969	Decommissioned July 1971	Foundered
Atul	GRSE	11 June 1970	Decommissioned 1980s	
Akshay	GRSE	Unknown	Transferred to Bangladesh Navy on 12 April 1973	Transferred to Bangladesh Navy on 12 April 1973 and served as BNS Padma and was eventually decommissioned
Abhay	GRSE	13 November 1961	Decommissioned 20 June 1980	
