= BNS Padma (1973) =

History

Bangladesh
- Name: BNS Padma
- Builder: Hooghly Dock & Port Engineers Limited, Kolkata
- Acquired: 12 April 1973
- Identification: Pennant number: P 312
- Status: Decommissioned

General characteristics
- Class & type: Ajay-class patrol vessel
- Displacement: 120 tons (standard); 151 tons (full)
- Length: 35.7 m (117 ft 2 in)
- Beam: 6.1 m (20 ft 0 in)
- Draught: 1.9 m (6 ft 3 in)
- Propulsion: 2 Paxman YHAXM diesel engine; 1,000 hp (750 kW); 2 Shafts
- Complement: 35 personnel
- Armament: 1 x Bofors 40 mm gun; 4 x GIAT 20 mm F2 AA gun

BNS Padma was a Ajay-class patrol vessel of the Bangladesh Navy. She was gifted by the Indian Navy in 1973. The ship was commissioned into the Bangladesh Navy on 12 April 1973.

== See also ==
- List of historic ships of the Bangladesh Navy
- BNS Surma (1974)
