= BNS Surma (1974) =

History

Bangladesh
- Name: BNS Surma
- Builder: Hooghly Dock & Port Engineers Limited, Kolkata
- Acquired: 26 July 1974
- Identification: Pennant number: P 313
- Status: Decommissioned

General characteristics
- Class & type: Ajay-class patrol vessel
- Displacement: 120 tons(standard); 151 tons (full)
- Length: 35.7 m (117 ft 2 in)
- Beam: 6.1 m (20 ft 0 in)
- Draught: 1.9 m (6 ft 3 in)
- Propulsion: 2 Paxman YHAXM diesel engine; 1,000 hp (750 kW); 2 Shafts
- Complement: 35 personnel
- Armament: 1 x Bofors 40 mm gun; 4 x GIAT 20 mm F2 AA gun

BNS Surma was an Ajay-class patrol vessel of the Bangladesh Navy. She was gifted by the Indian Navy in 1974.

Another vessel of Bangladesh Navy carrying the same name was built at Khulna Shipyard was commissioned into the navy in 2013.

== See also ==
- List of historic ships of the Bangladesh Navy
- BNS Padma
