= List of equipment of the Cuban Revolutionary Armed Forces =

This is a list of the equipment used by the Cuban Revolutionary Armed Forces.

== Small arms ==
Name	Image	Caliber	Type	Origin	Notes
Pistols
PM		9×18mm	Semi-automatic pistol	Soviet Union	Standard issue pistol
Browning Hi-Power		9×19mm	Semi-automatic pistol	Belgium / United States	
Submachine guns
PPS wz.1943/1952		7.62×25mm	SMG	Soviet Union / Polish People's Republic	
Sa 23		9×19mm	SMG	Czechoslovakia	
Assault Rifles
AK		7.62×39mm	Assault rifle	Soviet Union / North Korea	
AKM		7.62×39mm	Assault rifle	Soviet Union; Cuba	Standard issue assault rifle
Vz. 58		7.62×39mm	Assault rifle	Czechoslovakia	
Machine guns
RPK		7.62×39mm	LMG	Soviet Union	
PKM		7.62×54mmR	GPMG	Soviet Union	
DShK		12.7×108mm	HMG	Soviet Union	
Sniper rifles
Alejandro Sniper Rifle		7.62x54mmR	Sniper rifle	Cuba	
Anti Material rifles
Mambi AMR		14.5×114mm	Anti-materiel rifle	Cuba	
Rocket propelled grenade launchers
RPG-7		40mm	RPG	Soviet Union	
Grenade launchers
AGS-17		30×29mm	Automatic grenade launcher	Soviet Union	

== Army ==
=== Armoured fighting vehicles ===
Model	Image	Origin	Quantity	Details
MBT
T-62		USSR	ε400	
T-55		USSR	ε400	
T-54		USSR	ε400	
LT TK
PT-76		USSR	n/a	
ASLT
BTR-60 100mm		Cuba	n/a	
RECCE
BRDM-2		USSR	n/a	
IFV
BMP-1P		USSR	ε50	
BMP-1		USSR	ε50	
APC
BTR-60		USSR	ε500	
BTR-50		USSR	ε500	
BTR-152		USSR	ε500	
ABCV
BMD-1		USSR	n/a	

=== Anti-tank/anti-infrastructure ===
Model	Image	Origin	Caliber	Quantity	Notes
MSL • SP
2K16 Shmel		USSR	n/a	n/a	
MSL • MANPATS
9K11 Malyutka		USSR	n/a	n/a	
GUNS
D-44		USSR	85mm	n/a	
ZIS-2		USSR	57mm	600	

=== Artillery ===
Model	Image	Origin	Caliber	Quantity	Notes
MRL • SP
BM-14		USSR	140mm	n/a	
BM-21 Grad		USSR	122mm	n/a	
SP
2S3 Akatsiya		USSR	152mm	n/a	
Jupiter V		Cuba	130mm	n/a	
AAP-T-130		Cuba	130mm	n/a	
2S1 Gvozdika		USSR	122mm	n/a	
Jupiter IV		Cuba	122mm	n/a	
Jupiter III		Cuba	122mm	n/a	
AAP-T-122		Cuba	122mm	n/a	
AAP-BMP-122		Cuba	122mm	n/a	
CATAP-100		Cuba	100mm	n/a	
AAPMP-100		Cuba	100mm	n/a	
TOWED
ML-20		USSR	152mm	n/a	
D-1		USSR	152mm	n/a	
M-46		USSR	130mm	n/a	
D-30		USSR	122mm	n/a	
M-30		USSR	122mm	n/a	
MOR
M-38		USSR	120mm	n/a	
M-43		USSR	120mm	n/a	
M-41		USSR	82mm	n/a	

=== Air Defence ===
Model	Image	Origin	Quantity	Notes
SAM • Short-range
2K12 Kub		USSR	n/a	
SAM • Point-defence
9K33 Osa		USSR	n/a	
9K35 Strela-10		USSR	200	
9K31 Strela-1		USSR	n/a	
9K36 Strela-3		USSR	n/a	
9K32 Strela-2		USSR	n/a	
9K310 Igla-1		USSR	n/a	
Guns • SP
ZSU-23-4		USSR	n/a	
ZSU57-2		USSR	n/a	
BTR-60P SP		Cuba	n/a	
Guns • Towed
KS-19		USSR	n/a	
KS-12		USSR	n/a	
S-60		USSR	n/a	
61-K		USSR	n/a	
M-53		Czechoslovakia	n/a	
ZU-23		USSR	n/a	

== Navy ==
=== Submarines ===
Class	Image	Ships	Origin	Tonnage	Note
Submarine
Delfin class		n/a	Cuba	~100	1 Delfin.

=== Patrol and coastal combatants ===
Class	Image	Ships	Origin	Tonnage	Note
PCG
Rio Damuji class		BP-390 Rio Damuji; BP-391 Rio Jatibonico	Spanish transition to democracy / Cuba	~3,200	2 Rio Damuji with two single P-22 (RS-SS-N-2C Styx) AShM, 2 57mm guns, 1 hel landing platform.
PCM
Pauk-II class		n/a	USSR; Cuba	~510	1 Project 1241PE (FSU Pauk II) with 1 quad lnchr (manual aiming) with 9K32 Strela-2 (RS-SA-N-5 Grail) SAM, 2 RBU 1200 A/S mor, 1 76mm gun.
PBF
Osa-II class		n/a n/a n/a n/a n/a n/a	USSR; Cuba	~245	6 Project 205 (FSU Osa II)† with 4 single lnchr (for P-20U (RS-SS-N-2B Styx) AShM – missiles removed to coastal-defence units).

=== Mine warfare and mine countermeasures ===
Class	Image	Ships	Origin	Tonnage	Note
MHI
Yevgenya class		n/a n/a n/a	USSR	~96,5	3 Korund (Project 1258 (Yevgenya))†.
MSC
Sonya class		n/a n/a	USSR	~450	2 Yakhont (FSU Project 1265 (Sonya))†.

=== Logistics and support ===
Class	Image	Ships	Origin	Tonnage	Note
ABU
n/a		n/a	n/a	n/a	
AX
n/a		n/a	n/a	n/a	

== Coastal Defence ==
=== Artillery ===
Model	Image	Origin	Caliber	Quantity	Notes
Guns • Towed
ML-20		USSR	152mm	n/a	
M-46		USSR	130mm	n/a	
A-19		USSR	122mm	n/a	

=== Anti-Ship Missile launchers ===
Model	Image	Origin	Quantity	Notes
AShM
4K51 Rubezh		USSR	4	
Bandera IV		Cuba	n/a	(reported).

== Naval Infantry ==
No heavy equipment.

== Anti-aircraft Defence and Revolutionary Air Force ==
=== Aircraft ===
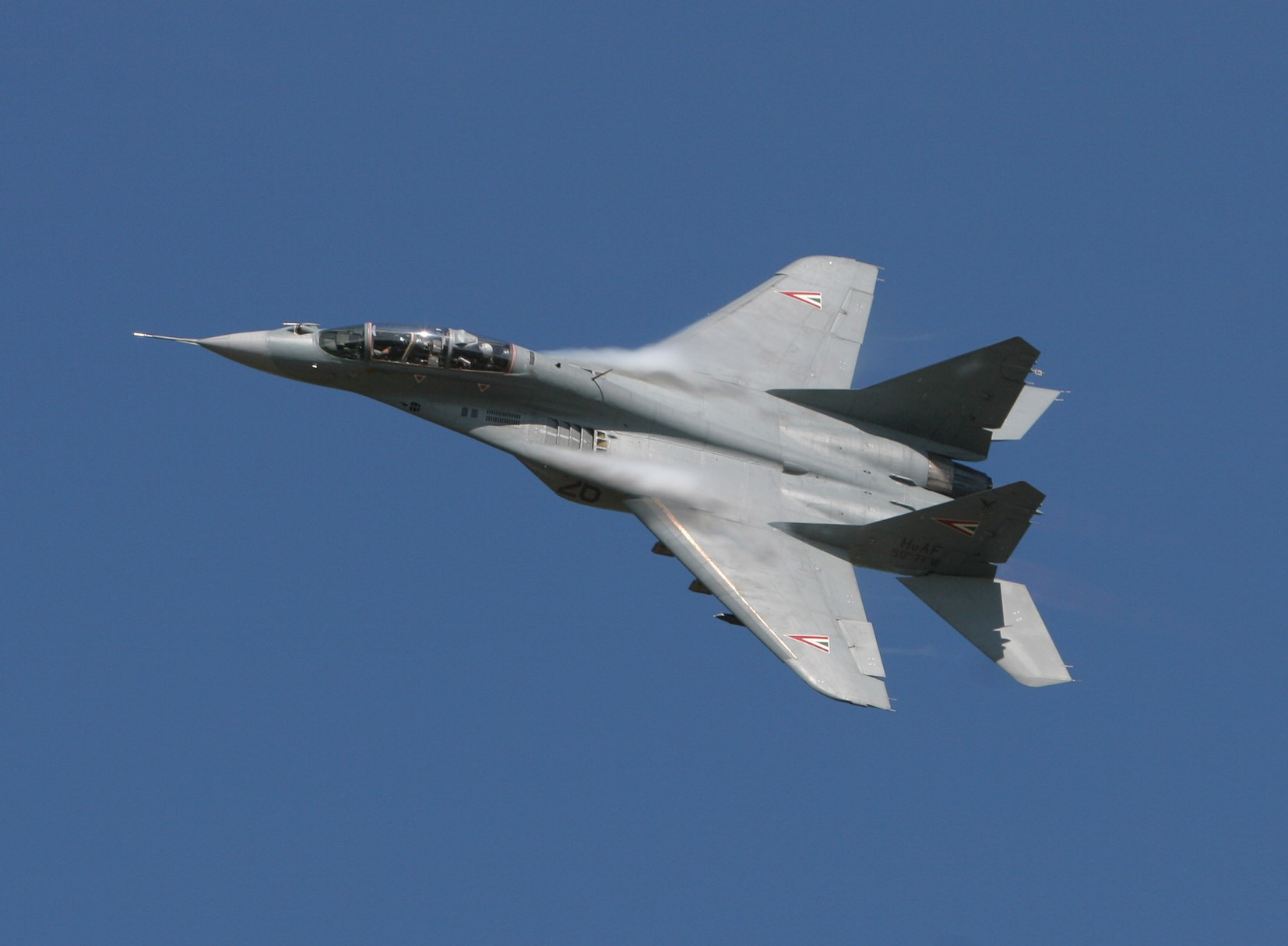
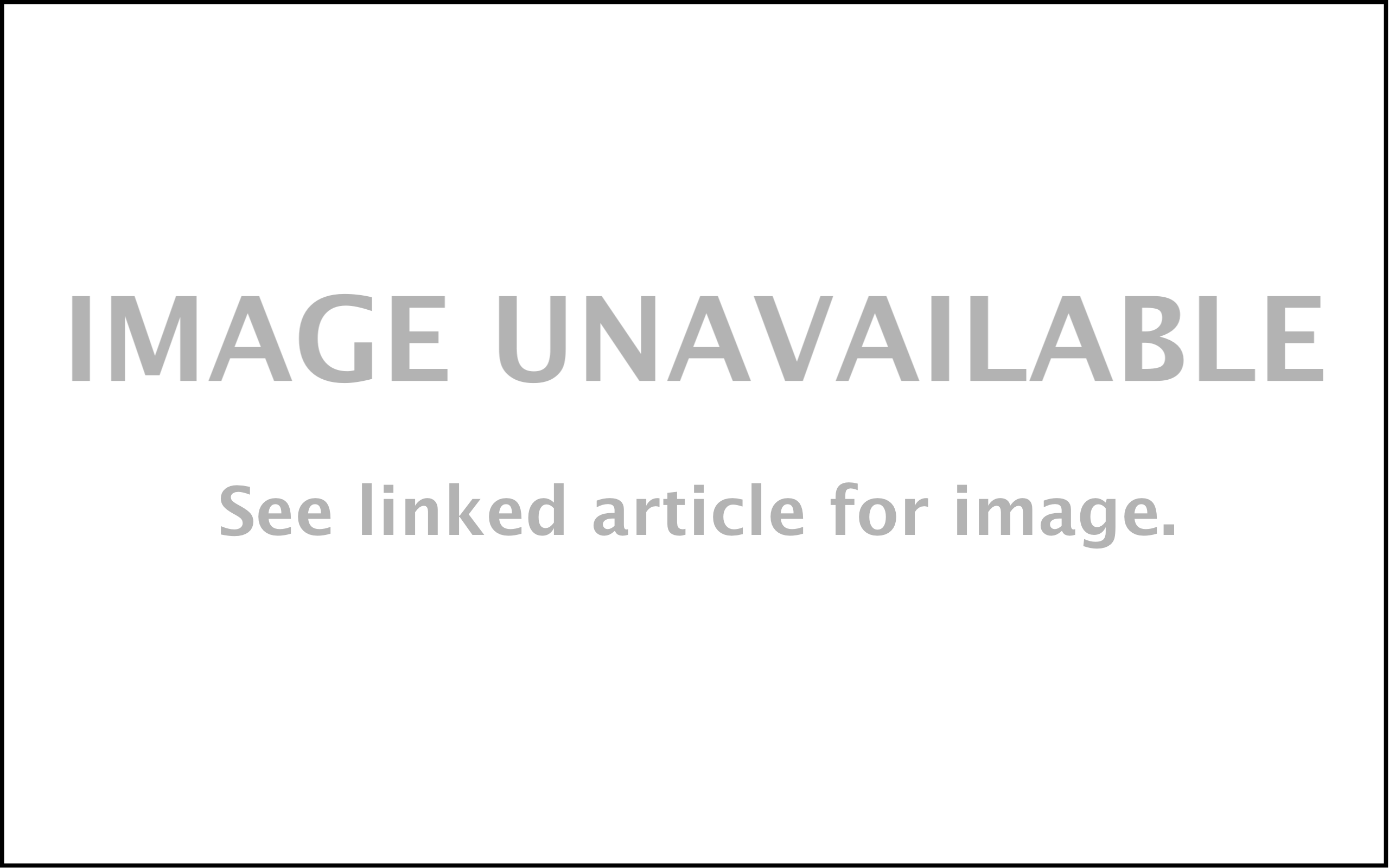
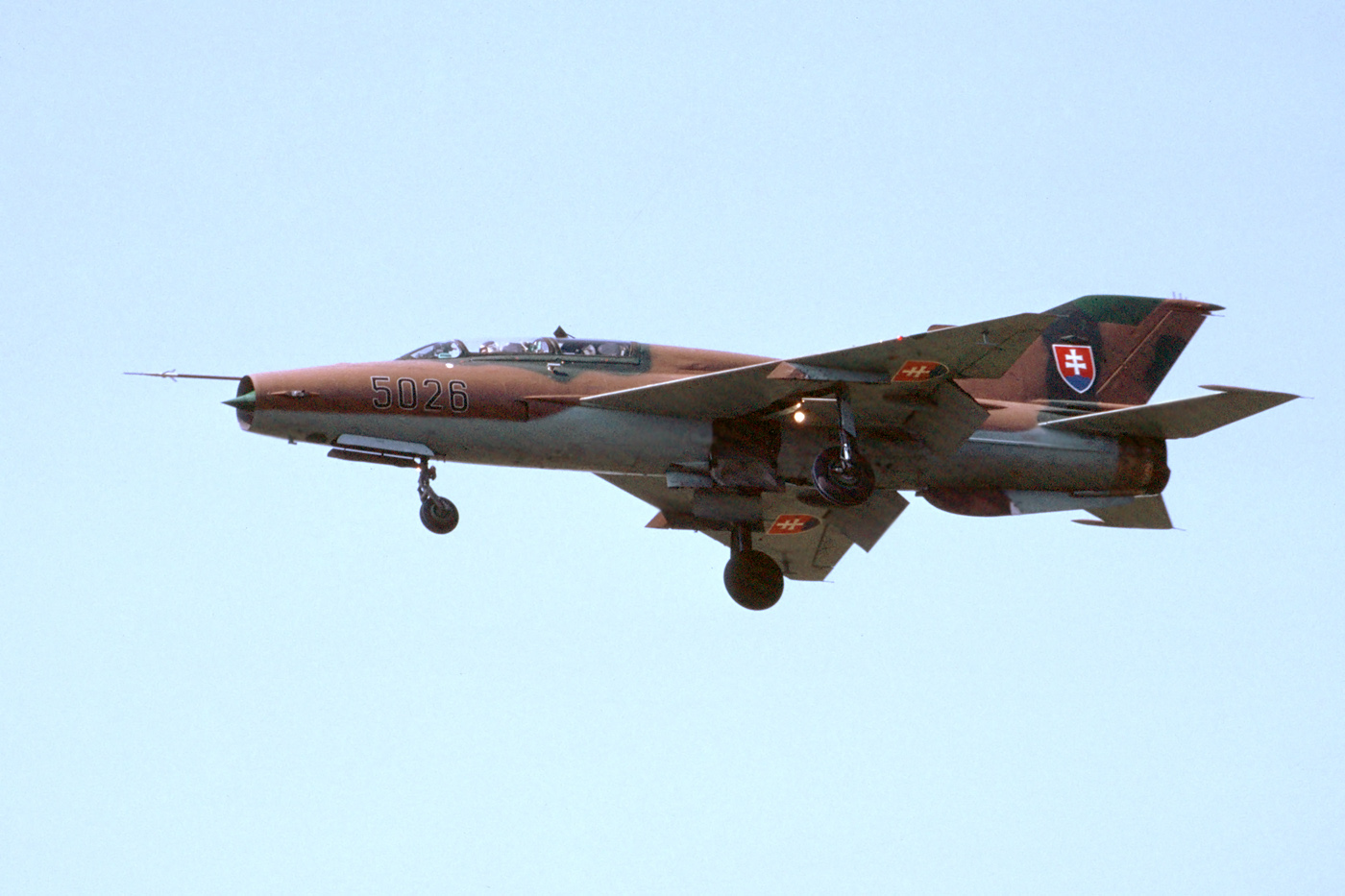
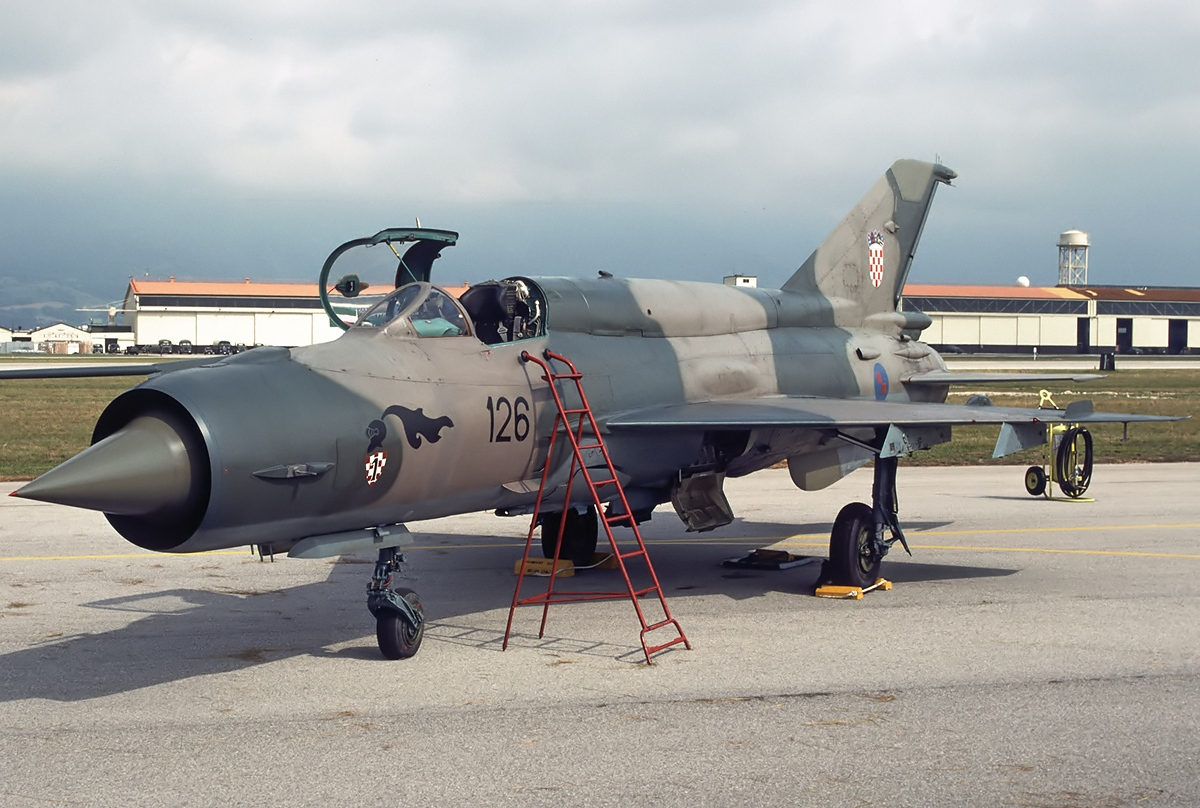
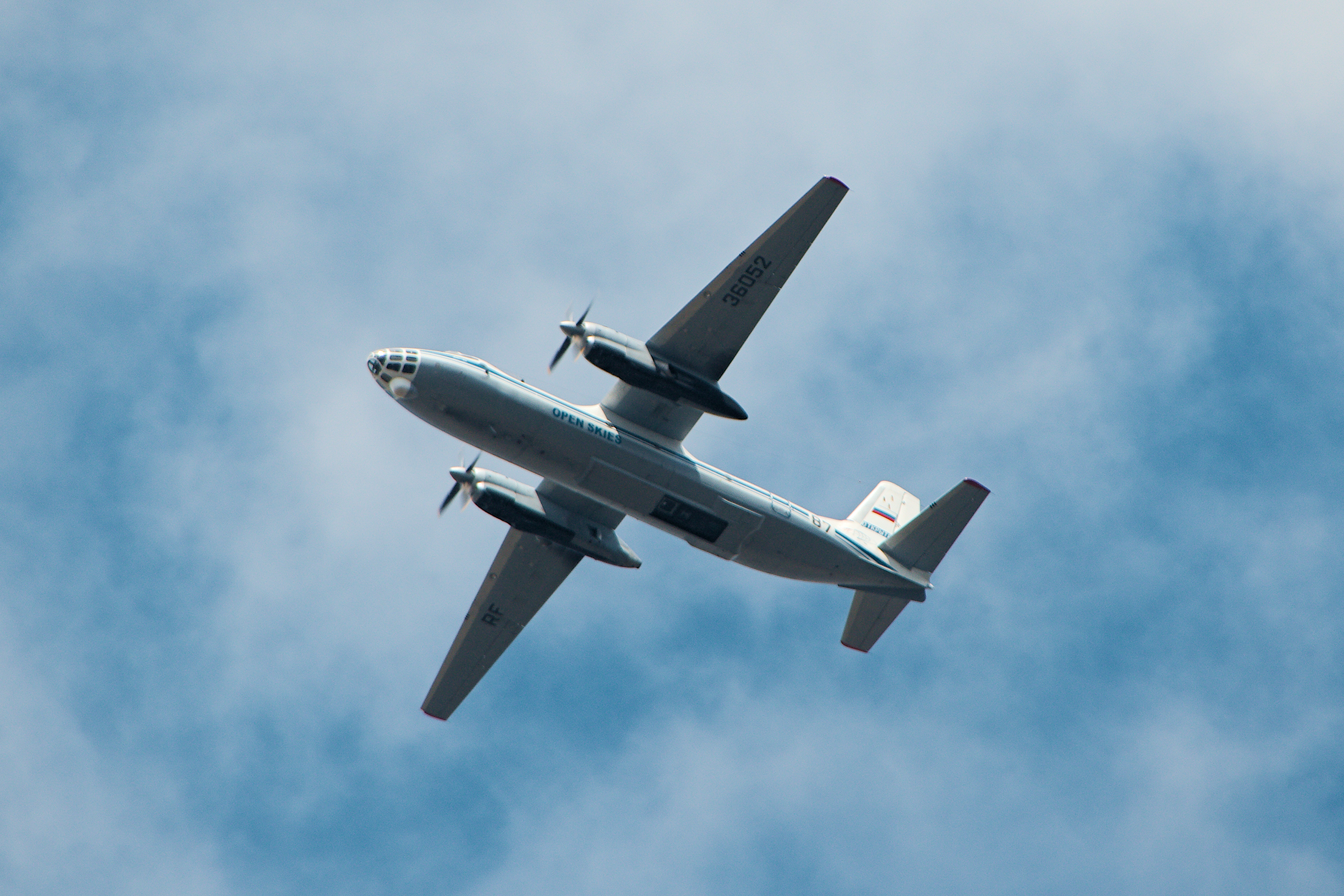
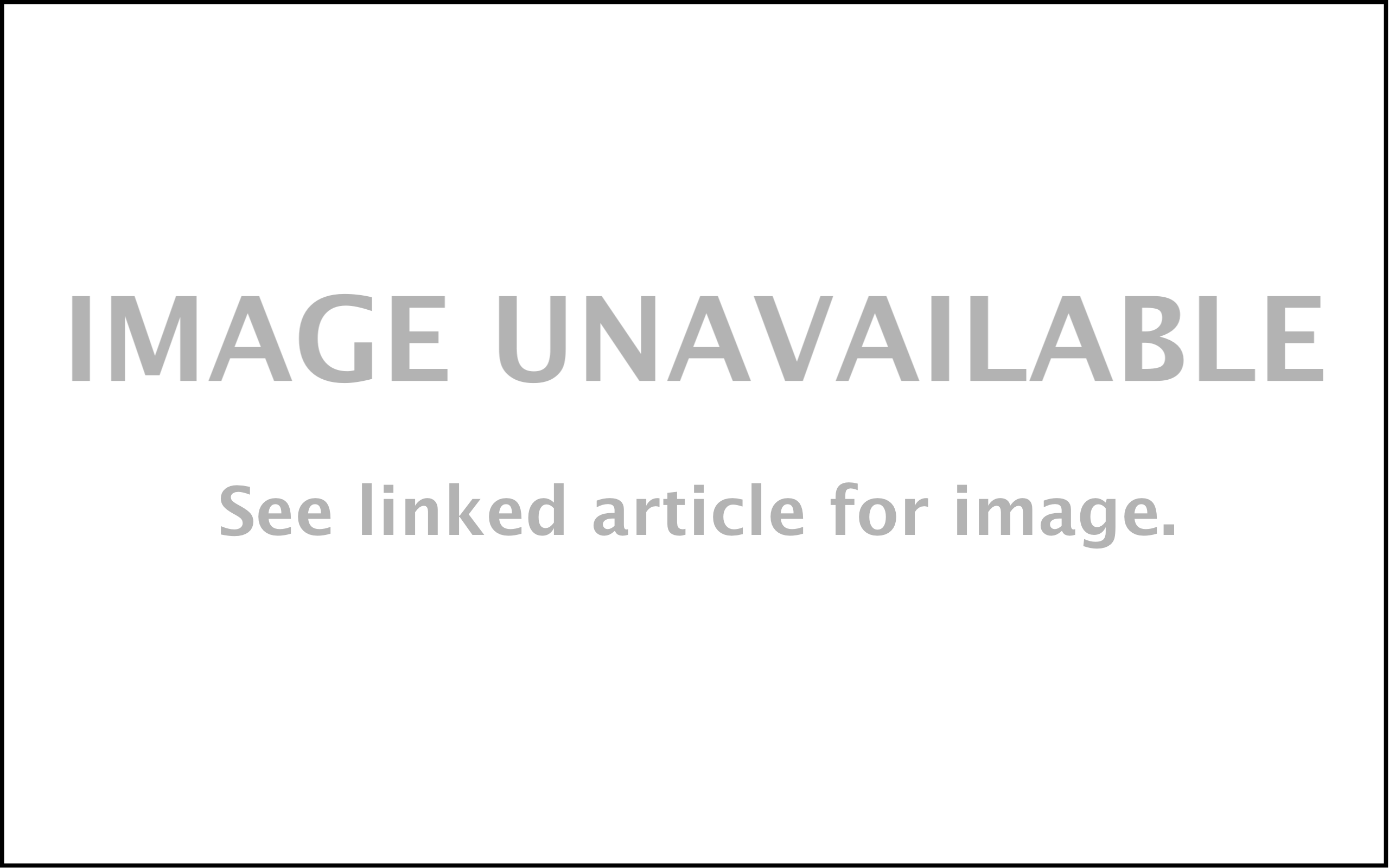
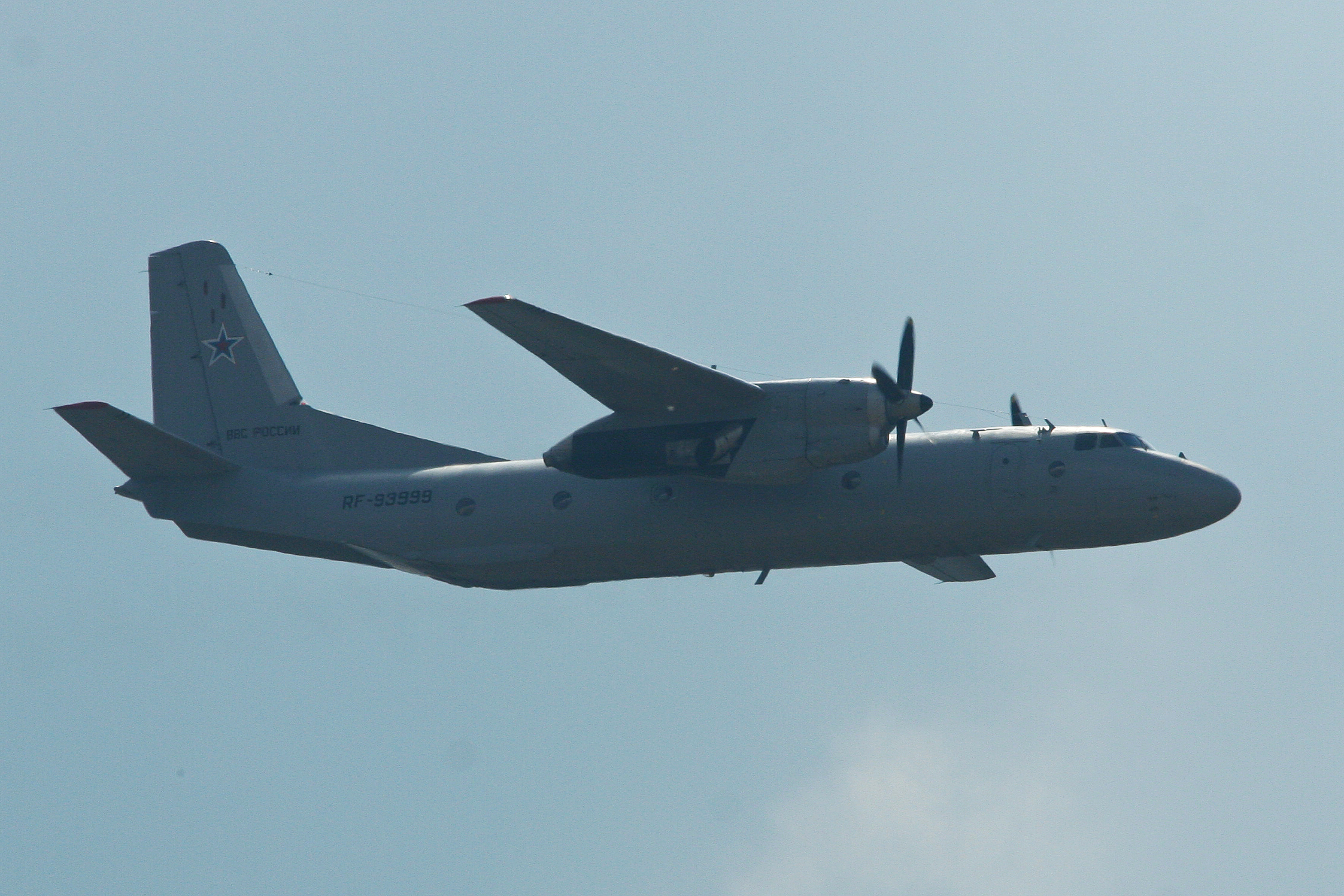
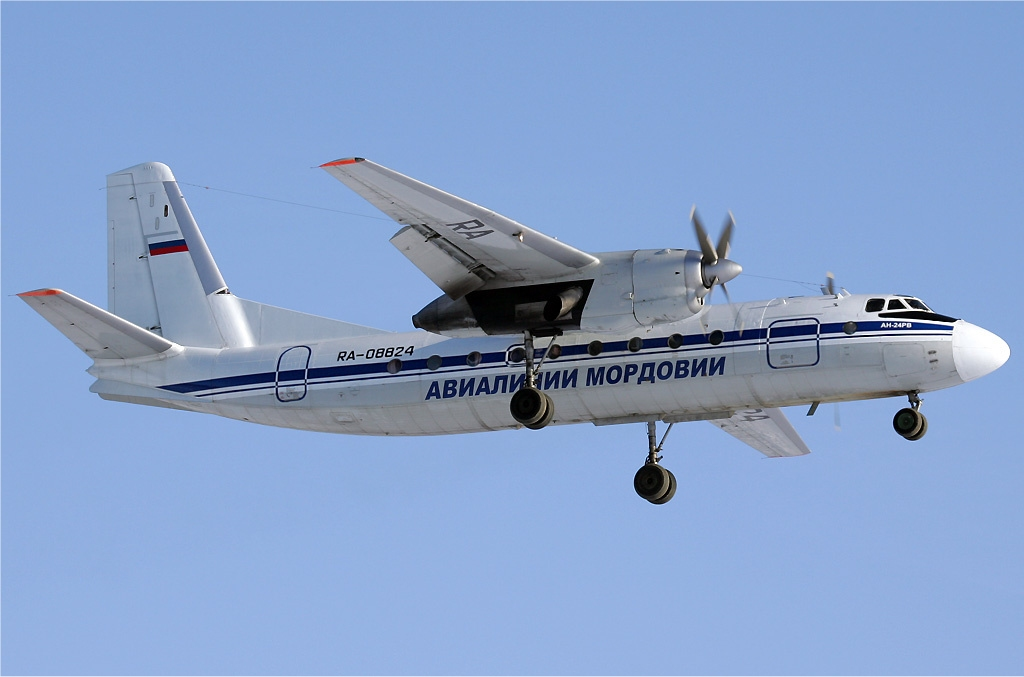
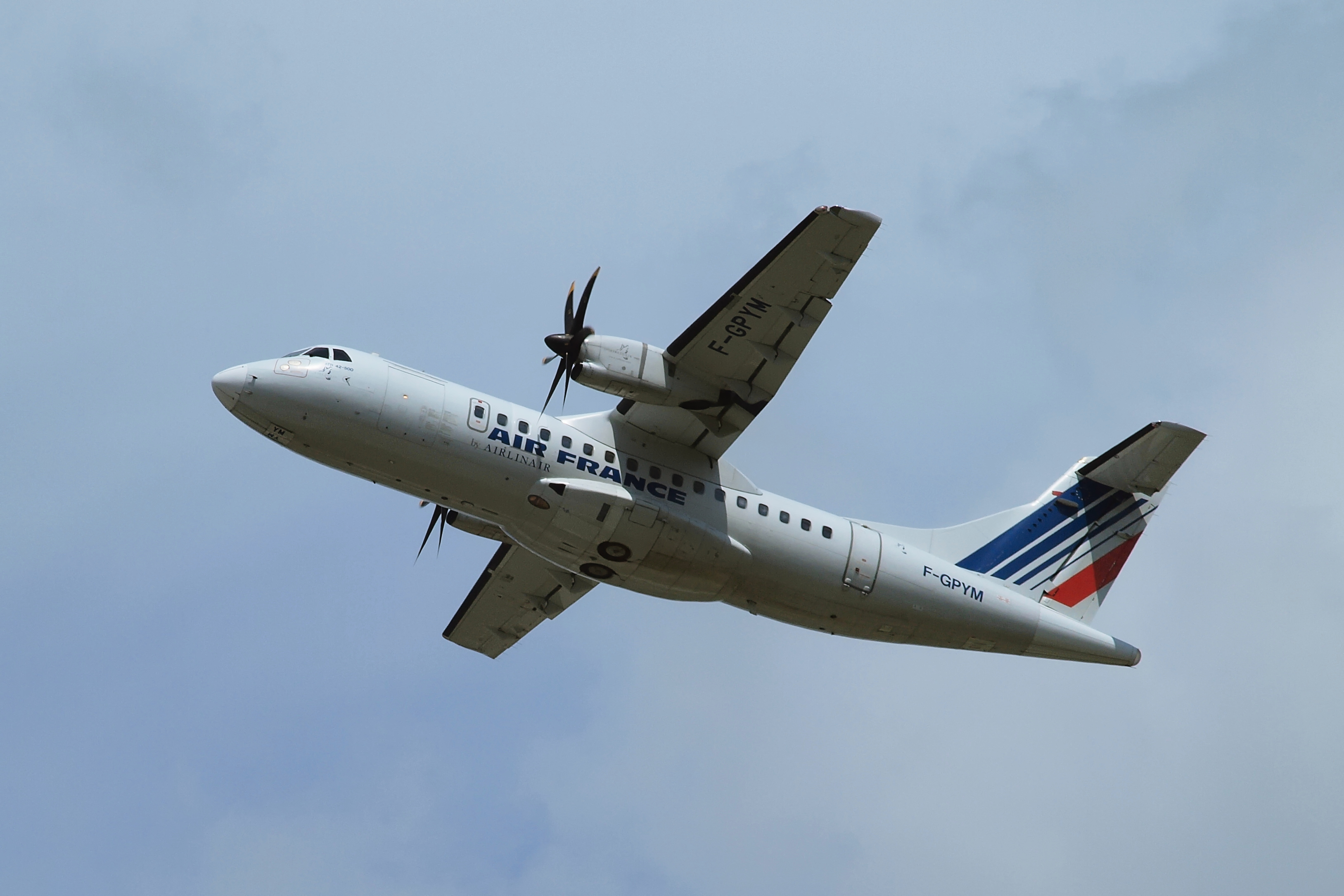
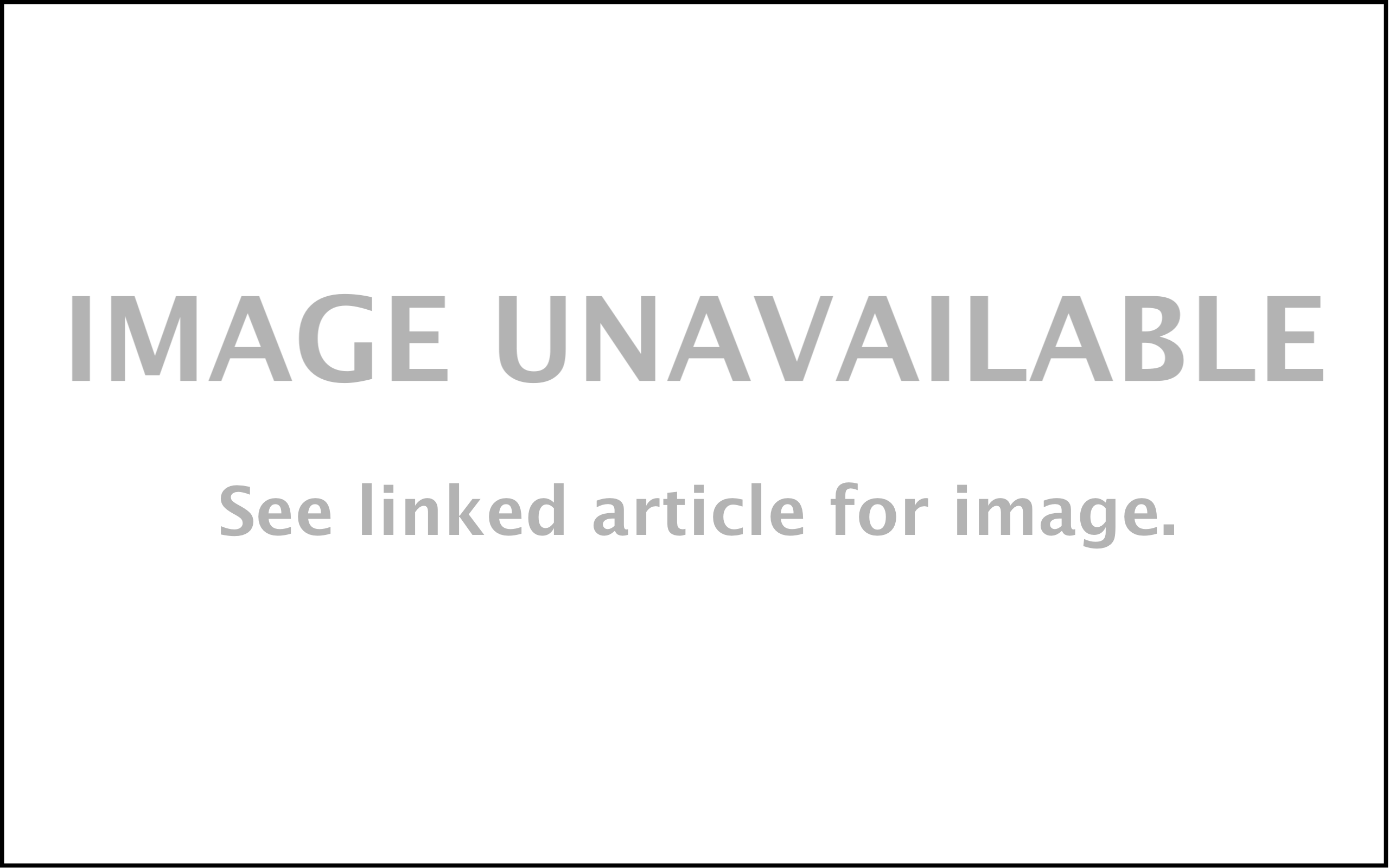
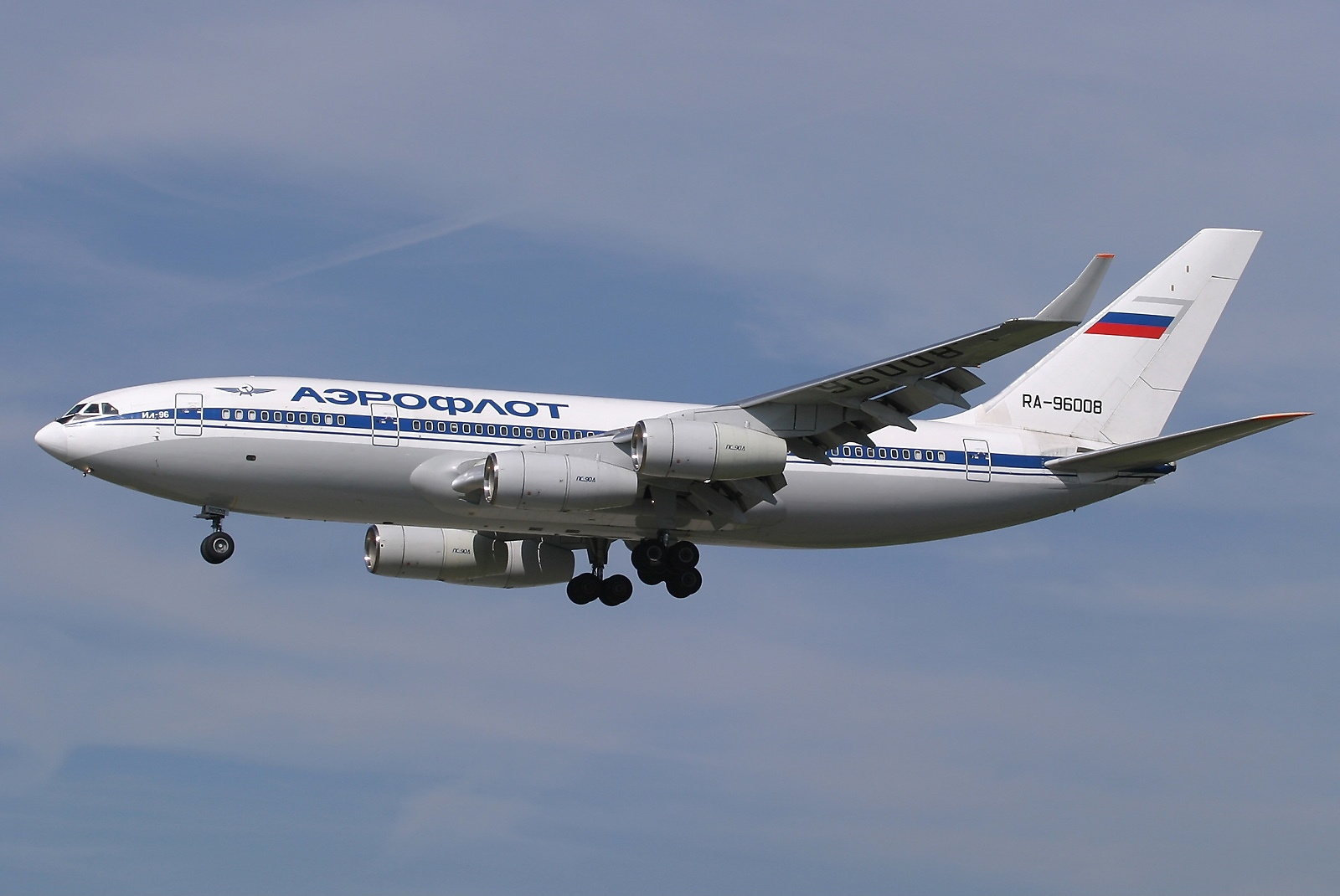
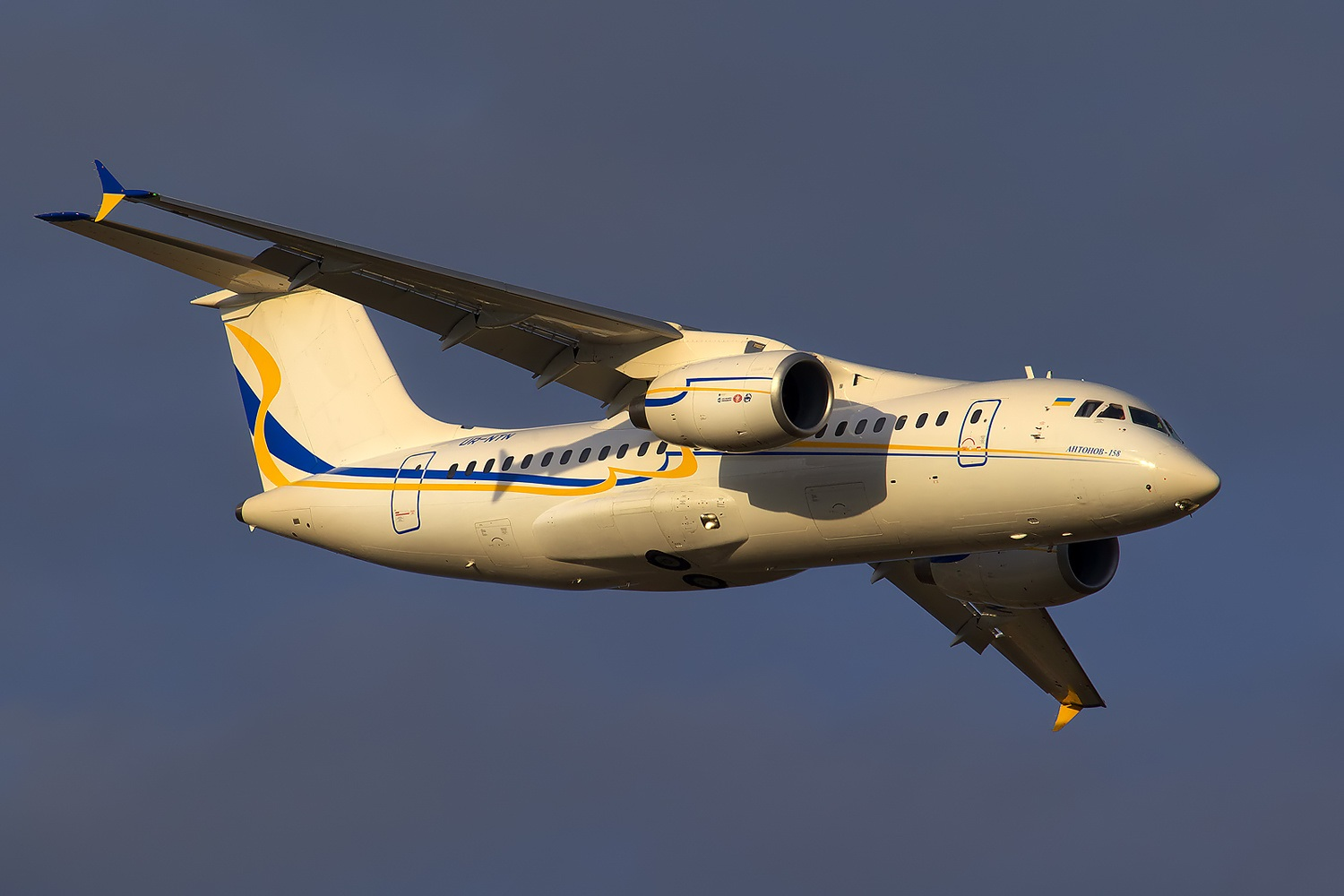
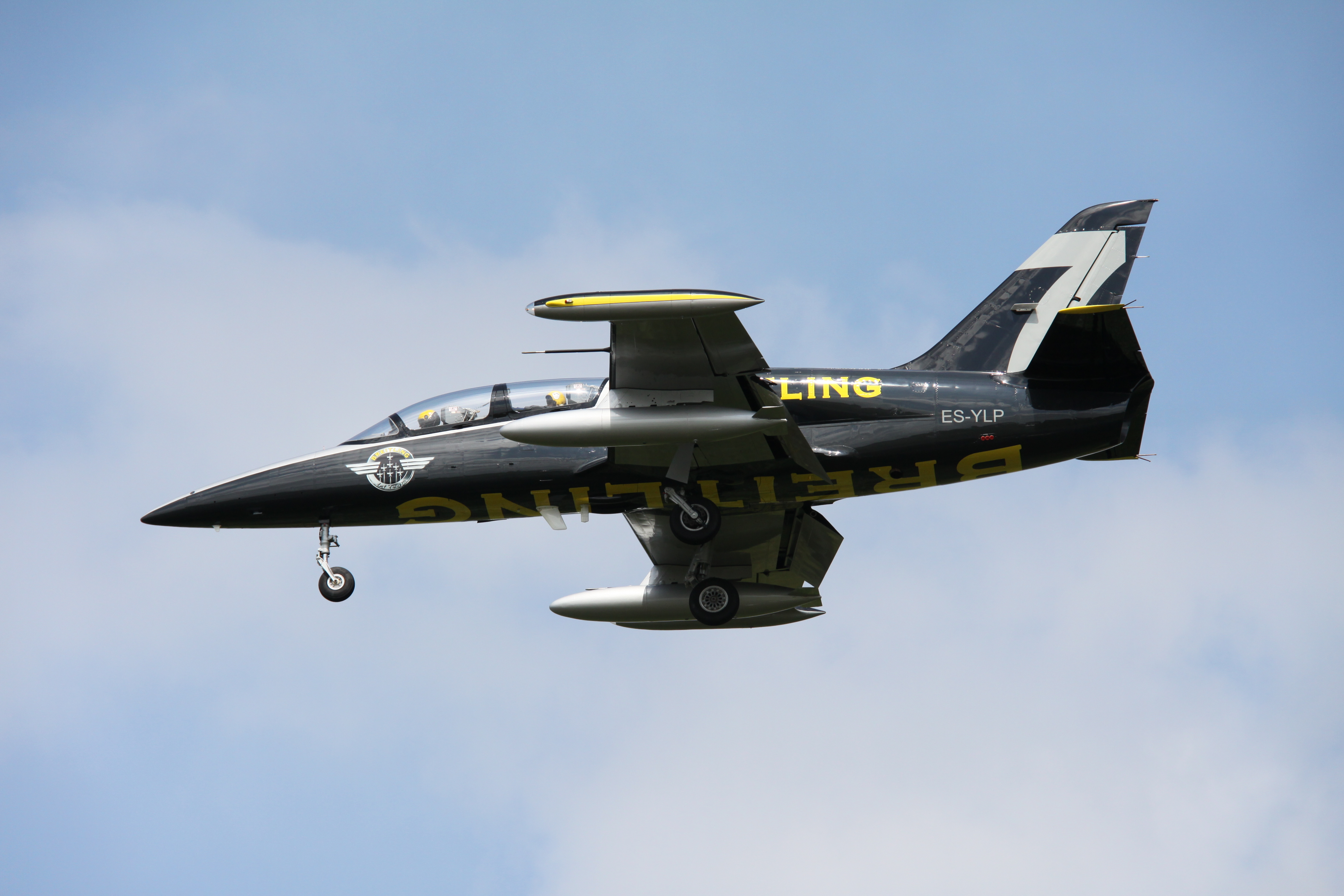
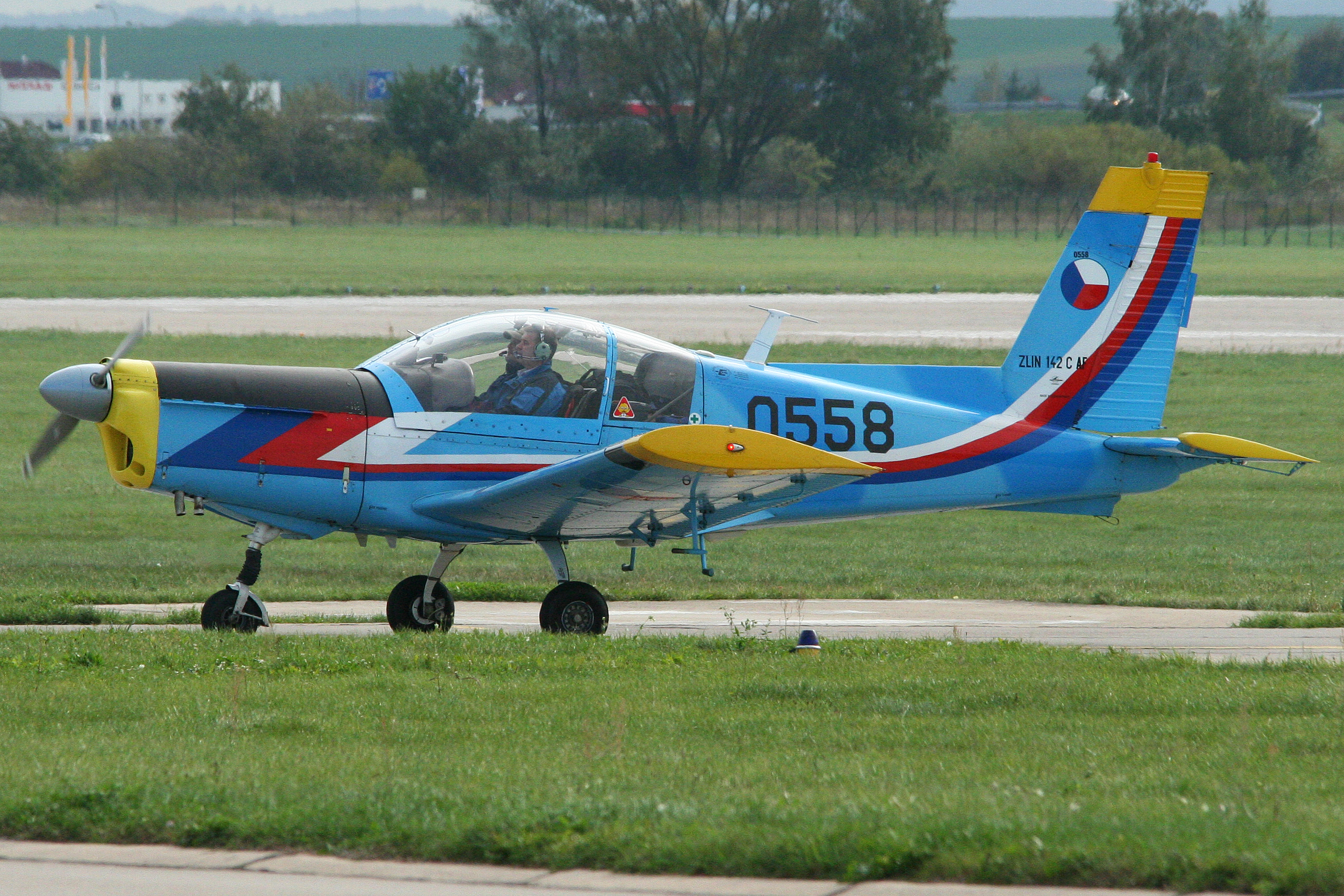
Model	Image	Origin	Quantity	Notes
FTR
MiG-29UB Fulcrum		USSR	100
MiG-29 Fulcrum		USSR	200
FGA
MiG-21UM Fishbed		USSR	ε200
MiG-21bis Fishbed		USSR	ε300
ISR
An-30 Clank		USSR	10
TPT • Heavy
Il-76 Candid		USSR	20
TPT • Light
An-26 Curl		USSR	30	(Aerogaviota).
An-24 Coke		USSR	10	(Aerogaviota).
ATR-42- 500		France; Italy	50	(Cubana & Aergaviota).
TPT • PAX
Tu-204E-100		Russia	3	(Cubana).
Il-96-300		Russia	3	(Cubana).
An-158		Ukraine	60	(Cubana).
TPT • TRG
L-39 Albatros		Czechoslovakia	ε25
Z-142C		Czechoslovakia	28

=== Helicopters ===
Model	Image	Origin	Quantity	Notes
ATK
Mi-35 Hind		USSR	48	(8 more in store).
MRH
Mi-17 Hip H		USSR	78	(12 more in store).
TPT • Medium
Mi-171		USSR	20	(VIP).
Mi-8P Hip		USSR	20	

=== Air Defence ===
Model	Image	Origin	Quantity	Notes
SAM • Medium-range
S-75 Dvina		USSR	n/a	(RS-SA-2 Guideline).
S-75 Dvina mod		USSR; Cuba	n/a	(RS-SA-2 Guideline – on T-55 chassis).
SAM • Short-range
S-125-2BM Pechora-2BM		Belarus	n/a	
S-125M1 Pechora-M1		USSR	n/a	(RS-SA-3 Goa).
S-125M Pechora-M		USSR	n/a	(RS-SA-3 Goa).
S-125M1 Pechora-M1 mod		USSR; Cuba	n/a	(RS-SA-3 Goa – on T-55 chassis).

== State Security ==
No heavy equipment.

== Border Guards ==
=== Patrol and coastal combatants ===
Class	Image	Ships	Origin	Tonnage	Note
PCC
Stenka class		2	USSR	~245	
PB
Zhuk class		18	USSR	~40	

== Youth Labour Army ==
No heavy equipment.

== Civil Defence Force ==
No heavy equipment.

== Territorial Militia ==
No heavy equipment.
