= Black Wasp (special forces) =

Cuban special forces unit

Mobile Brigade of Special Troops (Black Wasps)
- Avispas Negras
- Active: December 1, 1986–present
- Country: Cuba
- Branch: Cuban Revolutionary Armed Forces
- Type: Special forces
- Role: Elite light infantry Infiltrator shock troops
- Part of: Ministry of the FAR
- Engagements: Cold War

The Avispas Negras (English: Black Wasps), also known formally as the Mobile Brigade of Special Troops (BMTE) is a special forces unit in the Cuban Revolutionary Armed Forces. It is often identified as Military Unit 4895.

== History ==
They were officially created on December 1, 1986.

There were earlier special mission units that acted as part of the Ministry of the Interior, many of which served in Angola. The Landing and Assault Brigade was founded in December 1974.

In 1977, MINFAR decided to have its own special forces, after depending on the MININT in the Battle of Quifangondo in 1975.

On 22 November 2019, the First Secretary of the Communist Party of Cuba, Army General Raúl Castro, imposed the Antonio Maceo Order on the BMTE on the occasion of the 45th anniversary of its foundation.

In November 2019, the military unit was also awarded a diploma signed by General Leopoldo Cintra Frías.

On 3 January 2026, the United States killed 32 members of the Black Wasps while capturing Venezuelan President Nicolas Maduro. Among the deceased were colonels, lieutenants, majors and captains, and some reserve soldiers, ranging in age from 26 to 60. Two of the dead were 67-year-old Col. Humberto Alfonso Roca Sánchez and 62-year-old Col. Lázaro Evangelio Rodríguez Rodríguez.

== Personnel ==
The Black Wasps work in sub-groups of 5 members, who can be men or women.

Its main bases are in the old military prison "El Pitirre", located at kilometer 8 of the National Highway, and in the "Playa Baracoa" unit, near the El Mariel port area. Smaller units operate in "El Bosque de la Habana", where the Directorate of Special Troops of MINFAR and the El Reloj Club are located, the latter near the José Martí International Airport.

At their graduation, the soldiers and professional officers of this force carry out exercises in the Ciénaga de Zapata, or in the swamps south of the Isla de la Juventud (formerly Isla de Pinos), huge wetlands located both west of Cuba, in strict survival conditions. Passing these exercises means graduating.

The "Black Wasps" have received training from officers of the People's Army of Vietnam Special Forces (PAVSF), Korean People's Army Special Operations Forces (KPASOF), People's Liberation Army Special Operations Forces (PLA SOF), and the Russian Airborne Forces (VDV) and Spetsnaz GRU.

The uniform consists of a camouflage suit, a red beret, which from 2011, became a green beret, leaving the red beret only for the Prevention Troops (Military Police). The unit symbol is the shield with a black wasp on the front.

== Equipment ==
The armament is very varied and to a large extent is the same as that used by the rest of the Revolutionary Armed Forces of Cuba (FAR). In recent years, they have been seen in military parades with new weapons that include nationally manufactured weapons and old Soviet weaponry modernized with accessories such as Vilma optical sights and suppressors.

Name	Origin	Type	Notes
Makarov pistol	Cuba	Semi-automatic pistol	Made under license
CZ 75	Czechoslovakia	Semi-automatic pistol	
Stechkin APS	Soviet Union	Machine pistol	Used with 20-rounds magazines
Heckler & Koch MP5	West Germany	Submachine gun	
AKS-74U	Soviet Union	Carbine	
AKMS	Cuba	Assault rifle	Fitted with a polymer cylinder head and guard instead of wood and bakelite loader
AKMSB	Cuba	Assault rifle	As indicated by the letter "B", this version is the same as the AKMS, but it has a silencer and the Cuban-made red-dot sight "Vilma"
AKML	Cuba	Assault rifle	
AMD-65	Hungarian People's Republic	Assault rifle	Fitted with folding stocks; used by paratroopers
AS Val	Soviet Union	Assault rifle	
SVD Dragunov	Soviet Union	Sniper rifle	
VSS Vintorez	Soviet Union	Sniper rifle	
Mambí	Cuba	Sniper rifle	14.5mm anti-material rifle, designed and manufactured in Cuba and with a bullpup design.
Alejandro	Cuba	Sniper rifle	Bolt action sniper rifle used by troops of the territorial militia (MTT), and snipers
PKM	Soviet Union	Machine gun	
RPK	Soviet Union	Machine gun	
RPG-7V	Soviet Union	Rocket launcher	
9K38 Igla	Soviet Union	Rocket launcher	
RGD-5	Soviet Union	Hand grenade	
RKG-3	Soviet Union	Hand grenade	

In addition to western armament, other weapons of national manufacture are used, of which details and secondary equipment such as 60mm, 120mm mortars and demolition charges are not known.

The "Black Wasps" have vehicles in the event of an attack on the island, among which are a Fiero, an UAZ and a BRDM-2.
