= INS Mangrol =

INS Mangrol is the name of the following ships of the Indian Navy, named for Mangrol, Gujarat:

- INS Mangrol (1983), a Mahé-class minesweeper in commission from 1983–2004
- INS Mangrol (2023), a Mahe-class Anti-Submarine Warfare Shallow Water Craft

== See also ==
- Mangrol (disambiguation)
