= Battle of the Black Sea =

Battle of the Black Sea may refer to:

- Battle of Mogadishu (1993), between American and Somali forces
- Naval warfare in the Russian invasion of Ukraine, starting in 2022

== See also ==
- Category:Military history of the Black Sea
