= INS Malvan =

INS Malvan may refer to the following vessels of the Indian Navy:

- INS Malvan (1983), an Mahe-class minesweeper commissioned in 1983 and decommissioned in 2002
- INS Malwan (2023), an under construction ASW-SWC
