= Artan Unit =

Ukrainian military volunteer unit

- Артан
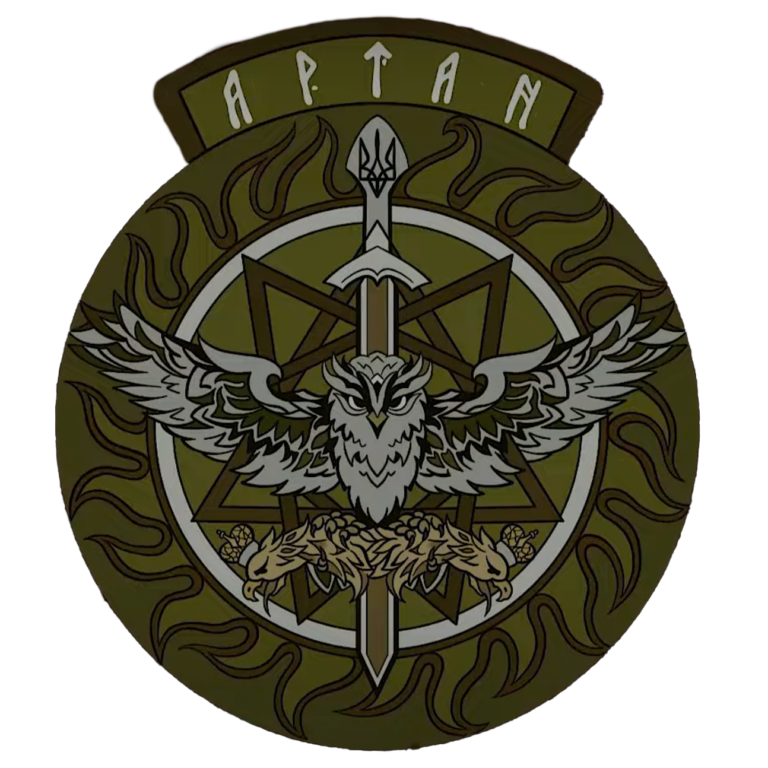
- Artan insignia
- Founded: June 2022
- Country: Ukraine
- Branch: Main Directorate of Intelligence
- Type: Spetsnaz battalion
- Role: Reconnaissance, counteroffensive and sabotage
- Part of: Ministry of Defence of Ukraine
- Motto: Latin: Scimus. Invenimus. Delemus (We Know. We Find. We Destroy)
- Engagements: Russo-Ukrainian War; Russian invasion of Ukraine; Northern Ukraine campaign; Battle of Kyiv; Eastern Ukraine campaign; 2022 Kharkiv counteroffensive; Battle of Kupiansk; Battle of Bakhmut; Battle of Chasiv Yar; 2024 Kharkiv offensive; Southern Ukraine campaign; Dnieper campaign; Zaporizhzhia Nuclear Power Plant crisis; Crimea campaign; Black Sea campaign; Snake Island campaign; Western Russia campaign
- Website: https://www.artan-gur.com

Commanders
- Current commander: Viktor Torkotyuk

The Artan unit is a Ukrainian battalion-level military unit, part of the spetsnaz units of the Main Directorate of Intelligence of Ukraine formed in 2022 as a response to the Russian invasion of Ukraine and has taken part in multiple combat operations throughout the Russo-Ukrainian War.

== History ==
=== Establishment ===
The special unit was established by officers of the HUR and volunteers on 1 June 2022 in Kyiv with the commander and some personnel having been participating in combat since 2014. The unit is named after the Artan tribe, who, according to legend, "killed any foreigner who comes to their land." Torkotyuk Viktor Viktorovych became the unit commander, with call sign "Titan". The battalion was formed entirely of volunteers and became widely known for its "daring" and "unique" operations. The volunteers included regular military personnel, special forces, ATO veterans and civilians with no prior combat experience. The unit also has a significant number of athletes representing players of boxing, wrestling, Muay Thai, kickboxing, taekwondo, pankration, MMA, rugby, athletics and other sports including world-famous athletes, world and European champions. The battalion commander himself was involved in football, karate, boxing and Muay Thai, being the bronze medalist in the 2019 Muay Thai World Championship and has the title of Master of Sports of International Class and has also been a veteran of the ATO as part of the 130th Reconnaissance Battalion.

=== Combat history ===
During the Russian invasion of Ukraine, the battalion has participated in many battles such as the Battle of Kyiv, Battle of Donbas, Battle of Bakhmut, Battle of Kupiansk, Battle of Chasiv Yar 2024 Kharkiv offensive, liberation of the "Boyko towers" and Black Sea campaign, freeing up of the grain corridor and partisan operations behind the Russian lines. The battalion has performed many special operations but most of Artan's operations will only be released following the conclusion of war.

It had also been praised several times by the President of Ukraine Volodymyr Zelenskyy

==== Zaporizhzhia Nuclear Power Plant crisis ====
One of the first special operations conducted by the battalion was in the aftermath of the Battle of Enerhodar in the form of an attempted amphibious assault to capture the Zaporizhzhia Nuclear Power Plant from Russian forces and end the Zaporizhzhia Nuclear Power Plant crisis. To prevent the worst-case scenario, the HUR decided to storm the station with large special forces units equipped with light infantry weapons to minimize casualties with reconnaissance troops being deployed ahead of the assault to identify landing sites and passages deep into Russian occupied territory. The special forces personnel including those of Artan crossed the Dnieper River in boats at night near Kakhovka Reservoir successfully landing, engaging in combat and sabotage operations. Although the operation itself was unsuccessful and the personnel were forced to withdraw but it provided valuable information, combat experience and also served as a diversionary measure.

==== Battle of Bakhmut ====
During the Battle of Bakhmut, the Artan unit was called upon several times to defend the city, to reinforce the infantry and to fortify "problematic" positions. The unit participated in urban battles along the Chasiv Yar-Kostyantynovka highway and also participated in clearing neighborhoods, capturing and fortifying positions with the support of the Armed Forces of Ukraine, the Special Operations Forces (Ukraine), and artillery.

==== Black Sea campaign ====
The Artan unit together with other units participated in the final stages of the Snake Island campaign capturing the island.

The unit's most famous operation was the capture of "Boyko Towers" which are oil and gas production platforms off the coast of Crimea. These platforms were occupied by Russia in 2015, and had been converted into military bases functioning as helipads and radar facilities. The Petro Godovanets, Ukraina, Tavrida and Syvash offshore drilling platforms were captured and returned to Ukrainian control. During the operation, Artan personnel were able to seize a stockpile of NAR unguided aircraft missiles and Neva radar systems. During one phase of this operation, a battle took place between Ukrainian special forces on boats and a Russian Su-30 which was damaged and forced to retreat.

It also conducted reconnaissance operations in the Black Sea and during one such operation, a reconnaissance boat was attacked by a Russian aircraft and an Artan soldier with the call sign “Conan” fell overboard. The boats were forced to retreat and “Conan” found himself alone in the open sea. For 14 hours he remained at sea awaiting rescue despite extreme fatigue. Jet skis, boats, and aerial reconnaissance vehicles were used for search operations and he was finally rescued. He later won the “Inspiration of the Year” award and a nomination of the “Ukrainska Pravda” award.

==== Battle of Hatishche ====
On 31 March 2023, two soldiers of the unit, Makarchenko Igor Anatolyevich and Frolov Yuriy Olegovich were killed while performing a combat mission near the village of Hatishche from explosive injuries.

==== Kursk raid ====
On 25 September 2023, the unit conducted a successful raid in Kursk Oblast during which Yanovich Yuriy Vyacheslavovich was killed while covering for the raiding force such that all other personnel withdrew unscathed.

==== Battle of Kupiansk ====
In October 2023, the Artan unit was deployed to take part in the Battle of Kupiansk with the task to help the units of the Armed Forces of Ukraine hold their positions. Russia had concentrated a large group of forces in that direction, in some areas outnumbering the Ukrainian forces tenfold and were supported by tanks and other heavy equipment. In one engagement, Russians tried to capture the positions held by the "Artanovites", the battle lasted 30 continuous hours and Artan emerged victorious. During the Kupiansk deployment, a soldier of the Artan unit with the call sign Khokhol found himself alone behind the frontlines, in the middle of Russian positions as he got lost as his group was leading Russian prisoners at night. Khokhol ordered his subordinates to retreat, distracted attention towards himself and tried to retreat, but lost consciousness after an explosion. He survived for the next three days in the middle of Russian positions and managed to safely return.

==== Crimea campaign ====
Artan has also been actively involved in conducting attacks and raids in Crimea. In October 2023, as part of a special operation of Ukrainian military intelligence, the unit's personnel landed on the western coast of the peninsula, as well as on the Tendrivskaya and Kinburnskaya spits, attacked the Russian forces and then withdrew.

This is not the first and not the last operation of the Security and Defense Forces of Ukraine on the Crimean peninsula. Most of them will become known only later. This is a systematic, planned and coordinated work of all units involved. The enemy will feel the consequences of our work for a long time. With our actions, we constantly remind the Russian invaders of the inevitability of the liberation of all occupied territories

==== Zaporozhzhia pilot evacuation mission ====
In early 2024, Artan scouts managed to recover the body of a Ukrainian pilot shot down by the Russians at the beginning of the full-scale invasion. His plane crashed in the middle of a minefield. The operation was carried out at a distance of less than a kilometer from Russian positions with a high activity of enemy UAVs in the area of operation. The chair, in which the pilot's body was lying, was mined. However, it was successfully demined and the body was evacuated.

==== Battle of Chasiv Yar ====
In the spring and summer of 2024, Artan participated in the Battle of Chasiv Yar. Unlike Bakhmut, there were significantly fewer gun battles and a significant use of drones, artillery, aviation, and KABs. During the durations of Artan deployment, the Russians never managed to enter the city and several massive assaults using heavy equipment were repelled with a significant number of Russian personnel being killed or captured. During the battle, on 15 March 2024, Rodionov Valery was killed in combat on 13 April 2024, Baranitskyi Felix Vyacheslavovich was killed in combat and Yavorsky Volodymyr Volodymyrovych was killed on 30 May 2024. On 12 July 2024, Ivasyshyn Yuriy Zhydachiv was also killed in action.

==== Tendrivskaya spit raid ====
On 6 August 2024, Artan unit and the Naval Center of the HUR conducted landing on the Tendrivskaya Spit and destroyed Russian armored vehicles including MT-LBs and electronic warfare complex as well as Russian fortifications. Russian forces suffered casualties whereas the unit withdrew with no casualties.

==== 2024 Kharkiv offensive ====
In the summer and fall of 2024, soldiers of the Artan unit, together with some other units cleared 400 hectares of forest near Lyptsy and destroyed 3 motorized rifle battalions, a "Storm" detachment and a reconnaissance company of the 7th separate motorized rifle regiment of the 11th Army Corps of the Russian Armed Forces as well as heavy equipment, electronic warfare equipment, and Russian fortifications.

The successful stalling of the offensive resulted in the protection of Kharkiv from a Russian assault and shellings and forced Russia to transfer additional forces to Lyptsy.

== Public activities ==
Since 2024, Artan has been organizing and conducting patriotic youth training "Zvytyaga" to educate young people "in the spirit of patriotism, military skills and team interaction". The training program includes theoretical and practical classes conducted by the unit's instructors. These include tactical training, the basics of handling weapons, tactical medicine, UAV control, topography and terrain orientation, physical endurance, martial arts, and more. Special emphasis is placed on developing leadership qualities and psychological resilience.

Children are also given lectures on the history of Ukraine, and meetings with cultural figures, singers, and military personnel are also organized by the unit.

As of December 2024, five "Zvytyaga" training courses have already been held in various regions of Ukraine.

=== Memorial to fallen servicemen ===
A memorial with 127 names of unit's soldiers killed during the Russo-Ukrainian war was established in Bohdan Khmelnitski park in Cherkasy in October 2026.

== Structure ==
- Management & Headquarters
- Commandant Platoon
- Tactical Group Revanche
- Artan Syndicate

== Symbolics ==
The unit's logo symbolizes strength, courage, devotion, brotherhood, professionalism, and responsibility. It depicts an owl, a symbol of wisdom, knowledge, and mystery. It is placed against the background of the Star of England, an ancient Slavic amulet. It holds a Russian dual headed eagle in its claws, as a symbol of victory.

== Inventory ==
Model	Image	Origin	Type
Vehicles
International MaxxPro		USA	Mine-Resistant Ambush Protected Vehicle
Humvee		USA	Infantry mobility vehicle
