= INS Malpe =

INS Malpe may refer to the following vessels of the Indian Navy:

- INS Malpe (1984), an Mahe-class minesweeper commissioned in 1984 and decommissioned in 2006
- INS Malpe (2024), an under construction ASW-SWC
