= INS Magdala =

INS Magdala may refer to the following vessels of the Indian Navy:

- INS Magdala (1984), an Mahe-class minesweeper commissioned in 1984 and decommissioned in 2004
- INS Magdala (2024), an ASW-SWC under construction
