= INS Mulki =

INS Mulki may refer to the following vessels of the Indian Navy:

- INS Mulki (1983), an Mahe-class minesweeper commissioned in 1983 and decommissioned in 2003
- INS Mulki (2023), an ASW-SWC under construction
