= Union de Industrias Militares =

State-owned Cuban weapons manufacturer

Unión de Industrias Militares
- Company type: State-owned
- Industry: Defence
- Founded: 22 December 1988
- Founder: Government of Cuba
- Headquarters: Plaza de la Revolución, Havana, Cuba
- Area served: Nationwide
- Key people: Luis Pérez Róspide (former head)
- Owner: Cuban Armed Forces
- Parent: GAESA

The Unión de Industrias Militares (UIM, English: Union of Military Industries) is the state owned military–industrial complex in Cuba. It is responsible for the repair of the weaponry and technology of the ground, air and naval units of the Cuban Revolutionary Armed Forces as well as the production of light weapons for infantry, ammunition, mines and other equipment. The UIM also devotes part of its production and service capacity to serving other requirements of the Cuban economy.

== History ==
The group has its origins in the 1960s with the creation of the Empresas Militares Industriales (EMI, English: Industrial Military Companies) after the Cuban Revolution. The group initially operated repair bases for the military. Throughout the Cold War, the military industry produced equipment under licence and oversaw the maintenance of equipment, much of it transferred from the Soviet Union.

After the end of the Cold War, during the Special Period of economic hardship of the 1990s, the UIM was given the new responsibility to "contribute to the economic development of the country and the self-financing of the armed forces". Thus, orders were given to convert part of the industry to civilian needs, with emphasis on nick, fruit, and other foodstuffs. By 1996, some 30% of the UIM's responsibilities were for the civilian sector.

== Facilities ==
The UIM is composed of twelve industrial military companies, seven research and development centers, and two centers of scientific-technological services throughout the country. Operating out of sixteen industrial installations, approximately 230 factories and companies are involved in total.

== Products ==
- Mambi AMR
- Alejandro Sniper Rifle
- Fiero fast attack vehicle
