= Mangrol =

Mangrol may refer to these places in western India:

- Mangrol, Gujarat, a town in Junagadh district, Gujarat
  - Mangrol State, a former Indian princely state seated in the above town, incorporated into Saurashtra State (later Gujarat)
  - Mangrol, Junagadh (Vidhan Sabha constituency), an assembly constituency in Junagadh district, Gujarat
- Mangrol, Bharuch or Hansot, a village in Bharuch district in Gujarat
- Mangrol, Surat (Vidhan Sabha constituency), an assembly constituency in Surat district, Gujarat
- Mangrol, Rajasthan, a city and a municipality in Baran district, Rajasthan

== See also ==
- Mangrol Assembly constituency (disambiguation)
- INS Mangrol, various Indian Navy ships
