= INS Malpe (1984) =

Retired Mahe-class minesweeper of the Indian Navy

History

India
- Name: INS Malpe (M 86)
- Namesake: Malpe
- Builder: Leningrad, USSR
- Commissioned: 10 May 1984
- Decommissioned: 4 Dec 2006
- Home port: Kochi
- Status: Decommissioned

General characteristics
- Class & type: Mahé-class minesweeper
- Displacement: 100 tons full load
- Length: 26 m
- Beam: 5.5 m
- Draught: 1.5 m
- Propulsion: Two diesel engines with 600 hp sustained and 2 shafts
- Speed: 12 knots (22 km/h)
- Range: 300 nautical miles (555.6 km) at 10 knots (19 km/h)
- Complement: 10
- Crew: 25
- Sensors & processing systems: MG-7 sonar
- Armament: 2 x 25mm/80 twin guns
- Notes: Primarily used for: Inshore mine sweeping, Harbor defense, Coastal patrolling.

INS Malpe was an Indian Naval minesweeper ship, named after a port in Malabar coast Malpe. She remained in service until decommissioned at Naval Base, Kochi on 4 December 2006.
