= INS Magdala (1984) =

Retired Mahe-class minesweeper of the Indian Navy

History

India
- Name: INS Magdala (M 88)
- Namesake: Port of Magdalla
- Builder: Leningrad, USSR
- Commissioned: 10 May 1984
- Decommissioned: 15 Feb 2002
- Home port: Kochi
- Status: Decommissioned

General characteristics
- Class & type: Mahé-class minesweeper
- Displacement: 100 tons full load
- Length: 26 m
- Beam: 5.5 m
- Draught: 1.5 m
- Propulsion: Two diesel engines with 600 hp sustained and 2 shafts
- Speed: 12 knots (22 km/h)
- Range: 300 nautical miles (555.6 km) at 10 knots (19 km/h)
- Complement: 10
- Crew: 25
- Sensors & processing systems: MG-7 sonar
- Armament: 2 x 25mm/80 twin guns
- Notes: Primarily used for: Inshore mine sweeping, Harbor defense, Coastal patrolling.

INS Magdala an Indian Naval minesweeper, took its name from the minor port of Magdala, located 5 miles (8.0 km) inshore of river Tapti at the Gulf of Khambat (Cambay). She was an inshore minesweeper (IMS) specially designed and built with glass reinforced plastic hull.

The ship was capable of operating in approaches to harbour and inshore waters in order to search, locate and destroy various types of mines.

== Service ==
As the naval band played Last Post, the national flag and national ensign fluttering on INS Magdala were lowered for the last time. That marked the decommissioning of INS Magdala, the sixth ship under project 1258 E.

INS Magdala, built at Leningrad in the erstwhile USSR, was commissioned on 10 May 1984 by Vice Admiral KK Nayyar, the then Flag Officer Commanding-in-Chief, Southern Naval Command. The ship was a part of the 20th Mine Counter Measure Squadron (MCMS) and was placed under the Naval Officer-in-Charge (Kerala & Lakshadweep) at Kochi.

During its commission, INS Magdala participated in operational activities, including mine countermeasures exercises, tracking drills, port visits, and search-and-rescue operations. Over its 17 years of service, the vessel logged over 45,000 nautical miles (83,000 km) and conducted a goodwill visit to Malé in October 1989.
