= INS Mulki (1983) =

Retired Mahe-class minesweeper of the Indian Navy

History

India
- Name: INS Mulki (M 87)
- Namesake: Mulki
- Builder: Leningrad, USSR
- Commissioned: 16 May 1983
- Decommissioned: 2003
- Home port: Kochi
- Status: Decommissioned

General characteristics
- Class & type: Mahé-class minesweeper
- Displacement: 100 tons full load
- Length: 26 m
- Beam: 5.5 m
- Draught: 1.5 m
- Propulsion: Two diesel engines with 600 hp sustained and 2 shafts
- Speed: 12 knots (22 km/h)
- Range: 300 nautical miles (555.6 km) at 10 knots (19 km/h)
- Complement: 10
- Crew: 25
- Sensors & processing systems: MG-7 sonar
- Armament: 2 x 25mm/80 twin guns
- Notes: Primarily used for: Inshore mine sweeping; Harbor defense; Coastal patrolling

The INS Mulki was a Mahé class minesweeper in the Indian Navy, named after Mulki, India, a port on the Malabar Coast, southwest India. She remained in service until decommissioned in 2003.

== Service ==
The INS Mulki was in service from 1983 to 2003.
