= INS Malvan (1983) =

Retired Mahe-class minesweeper of the Indian Navy

History

India
- Name: INS Malvan (M 84)
- Namesake: Malvan
- Builder: Leningrad, USSR
- Commissioned: 16 May 1983
- Decommissioned: 5 Jan 2003
- Home port: Kochi
- Status: Decommissioned

General characteristics
- Class & type: Mahé-class minesweeper
- Displacement: 100 tons full load
- Length: 26 m
- Beam: 5.5 m
- Draught: 1.5 m
- Propulsion: Two diesel engines with 600 hp sustained and 2 shafts
- Speed: 12 knots (22 km/h)
- Range: 300 nautical miles (555.6 km) at 10 knots (19 km/h)
- Complement: 10
- Crew: 25
- Sensors & processing systems: MG-7 sonar
- Armament: 2 x 25mm/80 twin guns
- Notes: Primarily used for: Inshore mine sweeping, Harbor defense, Coastal patrolling.

INS Malvan was an Indian Naval minesweeper, named after a port in Malabar coast Malvan. She remained in service until decommissioned at Naval Base, Kochi on 5 January 2003.
