= INS Mahé (1983) =

Retired minesweeper of the Indian Navy

History

India
- Name: INS Mahé (M 83)
- Namesake: Mahé, India
- Builder: Leningrad, USSR
- Commissioned: 16 May 1983
- Decommissioned: 15 May 2006
- Home port: Kochi
- Status: Decommissioned

General characteristics
- Class & type: Mahé-class minesweeper
- Displacement: 100 tons full load
- Length: 26 m
- Beam: 5.5 m
- Draught: 1.5 m
- Propulsion: Two diesel engines with 600 hp sustained and 2 shafts
- Speed: 12 knots (22 km/h)
- Range: 300 nautical miles (555.6 km) at 10 knots (19 km/h)
- Complement: 10
- Crew: 25
- Sensors & processing systems: MG-7 sonar
- Armament: 2 x 25mm/80 twin guns
- Notes: Primarily used for: Inshore mine sweeping, Harbor defense, Coastal patrolling.

INS Mahé was an Indian Naval minesweeper, named after a Union Territory Mahé in the west coast of India commissioned in 1983. She remained in service until decommissioned at Naval Base, Kochi on 15 May 2006.

== Service ==
The ship was commissioned by Vice Admiral K. K. Nayyar, the then Flag Officer Commanding-in-Chief Southern Naval Command, on 16 May 1983 at Kochi.

She was decommissioned at Kochi Naval Base in the presence of Flag Officer Commanding-in-Chief of Southern Naval Command, Vice Admiral Jagjit Singh Bedi. With the sounding of the 'Last post', the paying off pennant was hauled down to an end her 24 years of commission in the Indian naval service.

The Admiral inspected a 50-man guard of honor and Lt Cdr Boyiri Varma, the last commanding officer of INS Mahé, delivered the pre-decommissioning speech. At sunset, the Color Guard presented arms as the National Flag and the Naval Ensign were hauled down.
