= Mangrol Assembly constituency =

Mangrol Assembly constituency may refer to these electoral constituencies in Gujarat, India:

- Mangrol, Junagadh Assembly constituency in Junagadh district
- Mangrol, Surat Assembly constituency in Surat district

== See also ==
- Mangrol (disambiguation)
