= INS Mangrol (1983) =

Retired Mahe-class minesweeper of the Indian Navy

History

India
- Name: INS Mangrol (M 85)
- Namesake: Mangrol, Gujarat
- Builder: Leningrad, Soviet Union
- Commissioned: 16 May 1983; 43 years ago
- Decommissioned: 7 April 2004; 22 years ago
- Home port: Kochi
- Status: Decommissioned

General characteristics
- Class & type: Mahé-class minesweeper
- Displacement: 100 tons full load
- Length: 26 m
- Beam: 5.5 m
- Draught: 1.5 m
- Propulsion: Two diesel engines with 600 hp sustained and 2 shafts
- Speed: 12 knots (22 km/h)
- Range: 300 nautical miles (555.6 km) at 10 knots (19 km/h)
- Complement: 10
- Crew: 25
- Sensors & processing systems: MG-7 sonar
- Armament: 2 x 25mm/80 twin guns
- Notes: Primarily used for: Inshore mine sweeping, Harbor defense, Coastal patrolling.

INS Mangrol was an Indian Naval minesweeper, named after a port in the coast of Gujarat called Mangrol. She remained in service until decommissioned at Naval Base, Kochi on 7 April 2004.

== Service ==
The Mangrol was in service for close to 21 years and she covered 54,667 nautical miles in her lifetime.
