= Naval warfare in the Russo-Ukrainian war (2022–present) =

Maritime engagements during the conflict

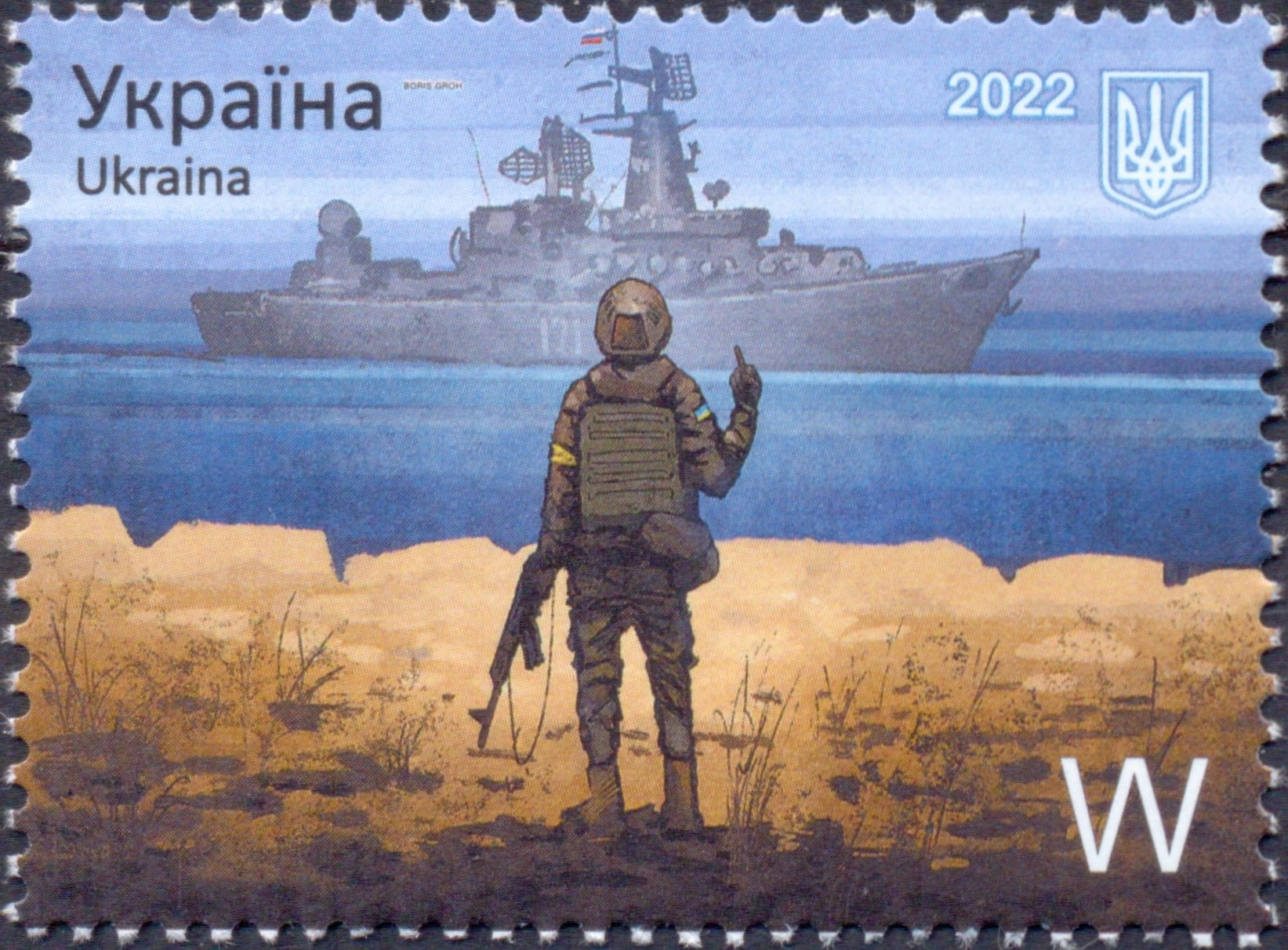
Ukrainian postage stamp, depicting a Ukrainian soldier giving Russian cruiser Moskva the finger, issued two days before she sank

Naval warfare in the Russian invasion of Ukraine began on 24 February 2022, when the Russian Armed Forces launched a full-scale invasion of Ukraine, in a major escalation of the Russo-Ukrainian War that began in 2014. Media reporting of—and focus on—the invasion has largely been on the terrestrial and aerial aspects, but maritime engagements have been consequential during the conflict. Disputes over Ukrainian grain exports through the Black Sea have played a prominent role.

== Timeline ==
=== 2022 ===
On 24 February 2022 – at the beginning of the invasion – the Russian Federal Agency for Sea and Inland Water Transport announced the suspension of maritime navigation in the Sea of Azov until further notice. The reason given was the commencement of "antiterrorist operations" by the Black Sea Fleet. The following day, 25 February, the Russian Department of Navigation and Oceanography warned that navigation was prohibited in the north-west Black Sea north of 45° 21’ due to activities of the Russian Navy. The navigational warning issued noted that ships and vessels in the prohibited area will be regarded as "terrorist threats".

After Russian forces took Berdiansk on the Azov Sea on 26 February, they seized at least eight Ukrainian warships; two Gyurza-M-class artillery boats, two Zhuk-class patrol boats, a Sorum-class tugboat (converted to a patrol vessel) and six small patrol boats. Russia Today did not mention the second Zhuk-class patrol boat or the six small patrol boats, but claimed that among these vessels captured were a Polnocny-class landing ship, a Ondatra-class landing craft, a Grisha-class corvette, a Matka-class missile boat, and a Yevgenya-class minesweeper (officially, the Ukrainian Navy had none of these assigned to bases west of the Kerch Strait prior to the war and no recent reporting of them crossing it was available). Two of the smaller boats were later revealed to be UMS-1000 patrol cutters, three were Kalkan-M boats and one was an Adamant-315 motor yacht.

On 28 February, Turkey closed the Bosporus and Dardanelles straits to warships of any country, as is its right under the Montreux Convention Regarding the Regime of the Straits of 1936.

On 8 March the Ukrainian armed forces stated they had sunk Vasily Bykov, which had attacked Snake Island, near Odesa. Videos posted on social media showed the warship being targeted. However, on March 16 the ship was shown entering Sevastopol with no obvious damage.

On 22 March 2022, a Raptor-class patrol boat was hit and damaged by an anti-tank guided missile.

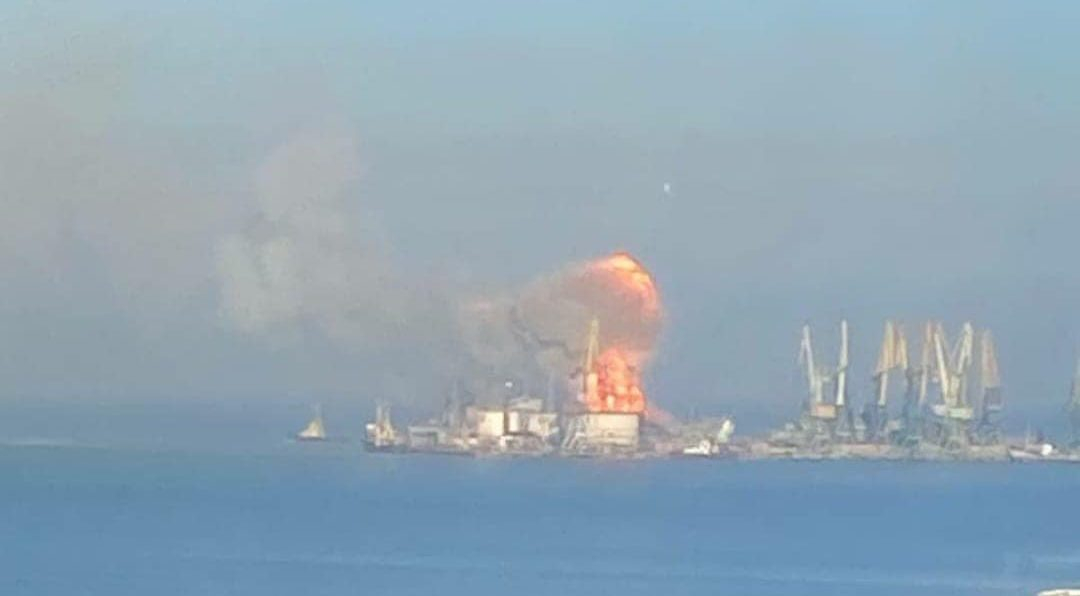
A Russian warship on fire near Berdiansk on 24 March 2022

On 24 March 2022, a number of ships docked in the port of Berdiansk, Ukraine, were damaged. The Tapir-class landing ship Saratov was destroyed. The Tsezar Kunikov and Novocherkassk sailed away, with fire and smoke billowing from one.

On 3 March 2022, while at anchor, the MV Helt struck a free-floating mine in the Black Sea, south of Odesa, Ukraine. The Helt was not carrying any cargo at the time, and according to the Ukrainian military, was forced into a dangerous area of the Black Sea. The six crew onboard all managed to escape and were rescued by Ukrainian authorities.

Drifting mines became a significant danger during the early phases of the invasion, with the NATO Allied Maritime Command issuing warnings about the devices, and their risk to shipping.

=== 2023 ===
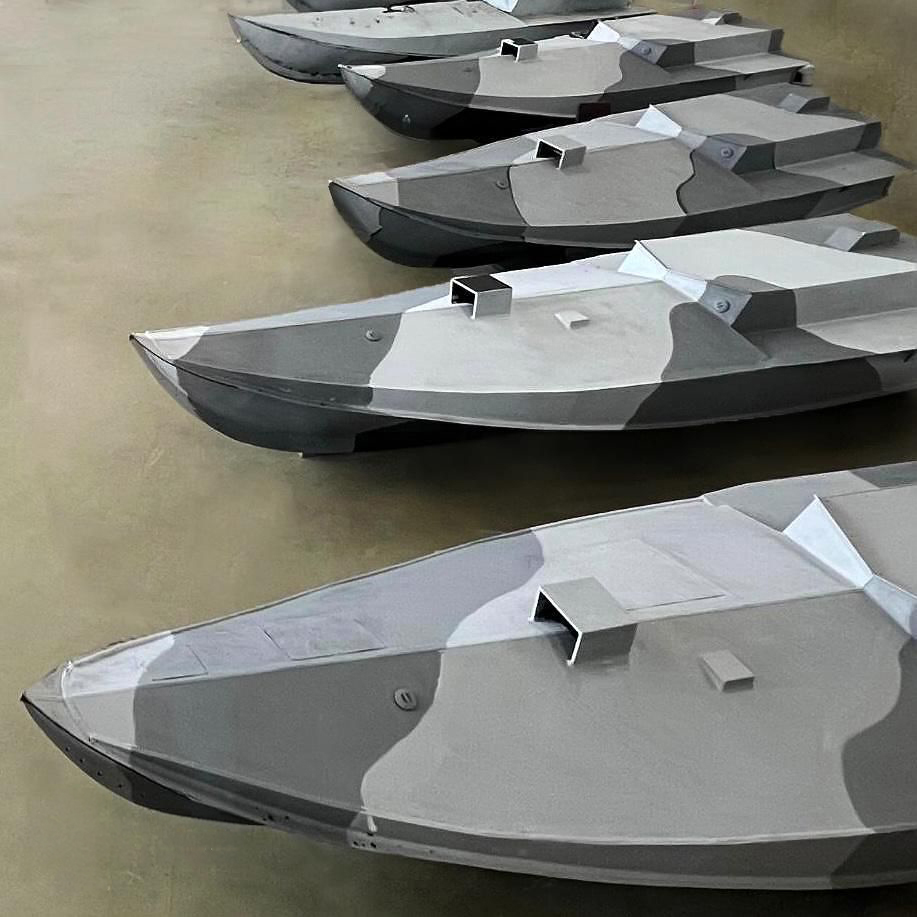
Ukrainian "Sea Baby" naval drones in 2023

During the 2023 Ukrainian counteroffensive, Ukraine increased its use of naval drones. On 17 July 2023, Security Service of Ukraine used a naval drone to attack the Crimean Bridge, releasing footage of the incident. On 4 August, the Olenegorsky Gornyak was attacked by naval drones during the night, near the Russian port of Novorossiysk, leaving the ship listing heavily to port.

The Russian Defence Ministry said that three Ukrainian naval drones were destroyed on 1 and 2 September 2023, while attempting to crash into the Crimean Bridge.

On 11 September 2023, Ukrainian military intelligence claimed that special forces had recovered several oil and gas drilling platforms off the Crimean coast that had been occupied and fortified by Russia since 2015. Among the facilities retaken were the Boyko Towers platforms and the 'Tavryda' and 'Syvash' mobile rigs following clashes during which a Russian Su-30 fighter jet, according to Ukrainian sources, tried to sink the assault boats with various weapons. Initially it was shot at with "service weapons" until it was reportedly struck by a Ukrainian MANPAD, damaging it and forcing it to retreat. Ukrainian forces also seized helicopter ammunition and a Neva radar system from the sites.

Also in September 2023, commercial vessels resumed their usage of the Ukrainian port of Odesa without asking permission from Russia – for the first time since the invasion began.

On 22 September 2023, the Ukrainian Air Force launched long-range Storm Shadow missiles at the Russian Black Sea fleet headquarters in Sevastopol. This attack damaged the landing ship Minsk and the submarine Rostov-on-Don, set the port on fire and resulted in a number of Russian personnel casualties.

In November, Ukraine launched 15 cruise missiles at the Russian shipyard Zaliv, destroying the missile carrier ‘Askold.’ This ship had not yet joined the Russian Black Sea fleet, making Ukraine the first country to destroy an enemy missile ship before it was officially commissioned.

=== 2024 ===
On 31 January 2024, Ukraine sunk its first Russian ship using only naval drones, sinking the Russian Black Navy Tarantul Class missile corvette Ivanovets. Ten MAGURA drones were used in this attack, with six hitting and sinking this ship. Over the next six weeks, Ukrainian forces sunk another two Russian ships with naval drones, sinking a Ropucha Class landing ship Tsezar Kunikov on 14 February and later the 65 million dollar Russian Navy Patrol Ship Sergey Kotov on 4 March, a ship that Ukraine had tried to sink three times previously before finally succeeding. These military achievements against Russian warships for Ukraine have pushed the Russian navy away from the coastline, enabling Ukraine to set up their grain export corridor.

On 24 March, Ukraine launched missiles at and damaged two large amphibious ships of the Black Sea Fleet, named Yamal and Azov.

On 19 May, Ukraine destroyed the last of Russia's carrier of cruise missiles in the Black Sea with drones when it hit the Zyklon Cruise Missile Carrier in Sevastopol. This ship was a 220-foot Karakurt class vessel named Tsyklon, and remains on the seafloor of the Black Sea.

On 25 December, Ukraine's Strategic Command attacked the command post of the Russian 810th Naval Infantry Brigade with missiles, a regiment of the Black Sea Fleet in Sevastopol.

On 31 December, Ukraine used the Magura V5 naval drone to hit and destroy two Russian Mi-8 helicopters, being the first time a naval drone has ever shot down a helicopter.

=== 2025 ===
In March 2025, Russia and Ukraine engaged in negotiations over a maritime truce in the Black Sea, as mediated by the US and held in Saudi Arabia. According to a White House statement, this truce aimed to ensure "safe navigation, eliminate the use of force, and prevent the use of commercial vessels for military purposes in the Black Sea." A tentative agreement was reached on 25 March to halt military strikes in the Black Sea and on energy infrastructure, however, the agreement was contingent on the Kremlin's conditions that sanctions on Russian agricultural exports be lifted. However, the truce faced immediate challenges, with the Kremlin contending that the truce would only begin once the sanctions were lifted. Ukraine, on the other hand, took the position that the truce should become effective from 25 March. This led to uncertainty over the truce's enforcement, and its credibility was further compounded when Russia attacked a Ukrainian Black Sea port of Myklolaiv with an overnight drone the following day.

On 28 August 2025, the Ukrainian reconnaissance ship Simferopol was sunk in the delta of the Danube River by a Russian naval drone, with the Ukrainian navy claiming that the strike had killed two crew members and left several others injured or missing.

This maritime truce has seen little success since it was agreed upon in March, with the Black Sea remaining a place of significant conflict. On 2 May, Ukraine used drone strikes to take down a Russian Su-30 fighter jet over the Black Sea near the port of Novorossiysk, marking the first time a marine drone has ever destroyed a combat aircraft. A few weeks later, on 19 May, the Security Service of Ukraine used a coordinated drone strike to destroy a Russian radar system and military warehouse at a gas production platform in the Black Sea.

In December 2025, Ukraine attacked the Russian shadow fleet tanker Qendil which was 2,000 km north of Bengazi. Ukraine announced that it killed Major General Andrey Averyanov, head of the Russian GRU's Department of Special Tasks hybrid warfare unit and operations in Africa. However, the government of Madagascar announced later that month that he is visiting the country, and RFI eventually withdrew its claim after more evidence emerged that he is alive.

== Black Sea Grain Initiative ==
The Black Sea Grain Initiative was effective from 22 July 2022 to 17 July 2023, and guaranteed the safe passage of grain via ships from certain Ukrainian ports.

Following the end of the period during which the Black Sea Grain Initiative was in effect, the Russian Defence Ministry said that it would deem all ships travelling to Ukraine to be potentially carrying military cargo. In the same statement, Russia declared south-eastern and north-western parts of the Black Sea to be temporarily unsafe for navigation.

However, despite the Black Sea Grain Initiative falling through, Ukraine has been able to re-assert itself in the Black Sea and push Russian warships away from the coastline, allowing them to set up a grain export corridor. Ukraine has successfully pushed Russia away from Odesa ports and set up this corridor through a number of military victories, including the Ukrainian liberation of Snake Island and the Ukrainian city Kherson on the Black Sea. In addition, Ukraine has successfully coordinated missile strikes against Russian Black Sea Fleet ships in Crimea and used unmanned sea drones to destroy and damage Russian naval vessels. As a result of these attacks, Russia has pulled back from the Ukrainian coastline and repositioned much of its fleet to more secure locations along the Russian coast, notably the port of Novorossiysk, to protect its vessels from continued Ukrainian strikes. Since the summer of 2023, Ukraine has been able to set up a 22 km zone of territorial water and their exports have gradually increased since the beginning of the war. By autumn of 2023, Ukraine was able to export 8.6 million tons of cargo and by the end of 2024, Ukraine had achieved nearly 100 million tons of total transshipment.

However, in response to this, Russia has launched dozens of attacks on Ukrainian ports since July 2023. The most recent attack was on 23 May 2025 when Russia fired two ballistic missiles at the Odesa Port, killing two and injuring seven others.

== Losses ==
At the outset of the full-scale invasion in February 2022, the Russian Black Sea Fleet significantly outmatched Ukraine's limited naval capacity. However, since then, Ukraine has been able to successfully deny sea control to Russia and inflict substantial losses on their Black Sea Fleet. Estimates have suggested that Ukraine has destroyed or disabled forty per cent of Russia's Black Sea fleet, which originally consisted of seventy-four ships. The Russian Navy is estimated to have lost twenty-nine ships, including the Moskva, the flagship of the Black Sea Fleet. The Ukrainian Navy has lost nine ships, including the Hetman Sahaidachny, the flagship of the Ukrainian Navy. A further one ship was damaged, and seventeen others were captured.

Ukraine has been able to inflict these heavy losses on the Russian Black Sea fleet through its use of unmanned sea drones, cruise missiles and asymmetric warfare. These military successes have severely impeded Russia's ability to operate safely near the Ukrainian coastline and Russia has been seen to be taking a more defensive stance in the Black Sea. Russia has moved its ships away from Crimea, more specifically Sevastopol, and towards safer harbours in Russia like Novorossiysk. In July 2024, Russia removed its last remaining patrol ship from Crimea and as of today, no significant Russian naval operations are happening in Sevastopol. According to the British Ministry of Defence, the Black Sea Fleet can be classified as "functionally inactive."

December 26, 2023, Ukraine's Air Force struck the Novocherkassk, a major Russian landing craft, while docked in Feodosia, southern Crimea. The attack, reportedly by air-launched cruise missiles, caused multiple explosions and fire, hinting that munitions aboard were detonated by the attack (Ukraine said the ship had launched cruise missiles against Ukrainian cities), Russian authorities and media confirmed the attack. Ukraine said the ship was destroyed—unlikely to return to service. Though Russian authorities did not confirm the ship's loss, they said one person had been killed (other sources indicated more), and said two attacking aircraft were downed. Independent analysts said the damage significantly hampers future Russian attacks on Ukraine's Black Sea coast.

The implications of these losses for the Russian Black Sea fleet have been significant. Russian logistics have been disrupted, making it more difficult for them to resupply Russian troops in southern Ukraine and to bomb Ukrainian targets from their warships armed with missiles. A combination of heavy losses in their navy fleet and the constant threat of missile and drone attacks from Ukraine has significantly reduced Russia's ability to exert influence and power in the Black Sea and into the Mediterranean Sea.
