= Alejandro sniper rifle =

Type of sniper rifle

Alejandro
- Type: Sniper rifle
- Place of origin: Cuba

Service history
- In service: 2002–present
- Used by: Cuba

Production history
- Designed: 2001-2002
- Manufacturer: Unión de Industrias Militares

Specifications
- Cartridge: 7.62×54mmR
- Caliber: 7.62 mm
- Action: Bolt-Action
- Feed system: internal magazine, 8 rounds

The Alejandro sniper rifle is a bolt-action sniper rifle which was designed and manufactured in Cuba by the Unión de Industrias Militares.

It was named after the code name used by Fidel Castro in the Sierra Maestra, which was also his middle name.

== Design ==
The Alejandro is a bolt-action precision rifle used by all branches of the Cuban Armed Forces. Its design started towards the end of 2001 and the beginning of 2002, and it fires the 7.62×54mmR cartridge fed from an internal magazine with a capacity of 8 rounds.

Although it can use different types of scopes, even Western ones, its standard is the PSO-1.
