= Yevgenya-class minesweeper =

1967 Soviet inshore minesweeper class

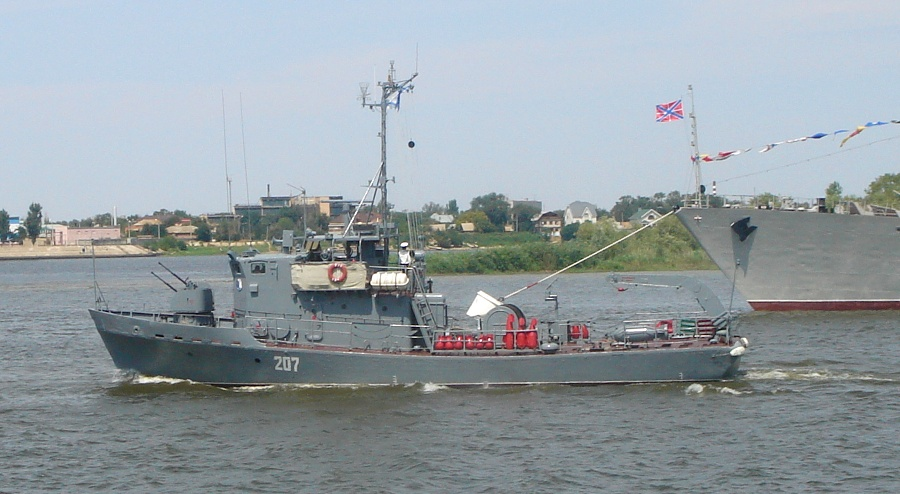
- Russian Navy minesweeper RT-71 in 2012

Class overview
- Name: Yevgenya class (Project 1258)
- Operators: Soviet Navy; Azerbaijani Navy; Cuban Revolutionary Navy; Russian Navy; Syrian Navy; Ukrainian Navy; Vietnam People's Navy; Yemeni Navy
- Subclasses: Mahé class
- Built: 1967–1980
- In commission: 1967–present
- Completed: 92

General characteristics
- Type: Inshore minesweeper
- Displacement: 89.9 t (88.5 long tons) (standard); 96 t (94 long tons) (maximum)
- Length: 26.13 m (85 ft 9 in) (oa)
- Beam: 5.9 m (19 ft 4 in)
- Draught: 1.35 m (4 ft 5 in)
- Propulsion: 2 shafts; Diesel engines, 630 kW (850 bhp)
- Speed: 12 knots (22 km/h; 14 mph)
- Range: 300 nmi (560 km; 350 mi) at 10 knots (19 km/h; 12 mph)
- Complement: 10
- Sensors & processing systems: MG-7 sonar
- Armament: 2 × 14.5 mm (0.57 in) machine guns

The Yevgenya-class, Soviet designation Project 1258 Korund, are a series of minesweepers built for the Soviet Navy and export customers between 1967-80.

== Design ==
The Yevgenya-class are small minesweepers built for inshore work. The hulls are constructed of glass-reinforced plastic. As built, they have a standard displacement of 89.9 tonnes (88.5 long tons), 91 tonnes (90 long tons) normally, 93.0 tonnes (91.5 long tons) at full load and maximum 96 tonnes (94 long tons). The Yevegenya-class measures 26.13 metres (85 ft 9 in) long overall, 23 metres (75 ft 6 in) between perpendiculars and 24.16 metres (79 ft 3 in) at the waterline with an extreme beam of 5.9 metres (19 ft 4 in) and 5.4 metres (17 ft 9 in) at the waterline. The vessels have a normal draught of 1.35 metres (4 ft 5 in) and 1.38 metres (4 ft 6 in) fully loaded.

As built, the minesweepers are powered by two diesel engines, turning two propeller shafts that create 630 kilowatts (850 bhp). This gives the ships a maximum speed of 12 knots (22 km/h; 14 mph) and a range of 300 nmi (560 km; 350 mi) at 10 knots (19 km/h; 12 mph). They carry 91 tonnes (90 long tons) of diesel fuel.

The vessels have twin-mounted 14.5 mm (0.57 in) machine guns. They are equipped with MT-34, AT-2, SEMT-3, Neva and GKT-3 sweeps. The minesweepers also mount MG-7 sonar, and they have a complement of 10.

== Ships ==
The following navies have operated Yevgenya-class minesweepers:

- Angolan Navy - 2
- Russian Navy - at least one (RT-71) remained active in the Caspian Flotilla as of 2024; a few others may also remain in service as of 2025
- Azerbaijan Navy - 5 ships
- Bulgarian Navy - 4 ships in service
- Cuban Navy - 11 ships transferred
- Indian Navy - 6 ships transferred (all decommissioned by 2006). Also known as Mahé-class minesweeper.
- Iraqi Navy - 3 ships (transferred in 1975)
- Mozambique - 2 ships transferred (Decommissioned in 1993)
- Nicaraguan Navy - 4 ships (ex-Cuban)
- Syrian Navy - 5 ships transferred
- Vietnam Navy 2 ships
- Yemen Navy - 2 ships transferred

== See also ==
- List of ships of the Soviet Navy
- List of ships of Russia by project number

== Sources ==
- Gardiner, Robert; Chumbley, Stephen & Budzbon, Przemysław, eds. (1995). Conway's All the World's Fighting Ships 1947–1995. Annapolis, Maryland: Naval Institute Press. ISBN 1-55750-132-7.
