= Mambi AMR =

Type of bullpup anti-material rifle

Mambi
- Type: Bullpup anti-material rifle
- Place of origin: Cuba

Service history
- In service: 1980s–present
- Used by: Cuba
- Wars: See Conflicts

Production history
- Manufacturer: Union de Industrias Militares
- Produced: 1981

Specifications
- Length: 2100 mm (83 in)
- Barrel length: 1219 mm (47 in)
- Cartridge: 14.5×114mm
- Caliber: 14.5mm
- Action: Gas-operated
- Muzzle velocity: 1,114 m/s (3,655 ft/s)
- Effective firing range: 2,000 m (6,600 ft)
- Maximum firing range: 3,000 m (9,800 ft)
- Feed system: 5-round detachable box magazine
- Sights: None

The Mambi-1 AMR is a semi-automatic anti-materiel rifle designed and manufactured in Cuba. It was named after the Mambises, who were rebel soldiers that fought against the Kingdom of Spain during the Cuban War of Independence (1895–1898).

== History ==
Little is known about this weapon, as it has received little attention in mainstream media.

A sniper rifle variant, the Mambi-2 SR was developed soon after the completion of the anti-material rifle. It fires 12.7×108mm rounds.

== Design ==
The Mambi was designed to be used against a variety of soft-skinned ground vehicles, small boats, and even helicopters. It uses the powerful Soviet 14.5×114mm round. The Mambi appears to be a Bullpup since its 5-round magazine and action are placed behind the trigger group. It is fitted with a muzzle brake to help reduce recoil created by the round it fires. The rifle weighs approximately 14 kg and its design is similar to the Barrett M82A2.

The weapon is designed to be fired from a prone position due to large amounts of recoil.

== Conflicts ==
The Mambi AMR has been used in the following conflicts:

- South African Border War
- Angolan Civil War

== See also ==
- Barret M82
- List of bullpup firearms
- List of sniper rifles
- PTRS-41
- PTRD
- Carl Gustaf 20 mm recoilless rifle
