= Mahé-class minesweeper =

Retired class of minesweepers operated by the Indian Navy

Class overview
- Name: Mahé class
- Operators: Indian Navy
- Succeeded by: Pondicherry-class minesweeper
- In commission: 1986–2006
- Planned: 6
- Completed: 6
- Active: 0
- Retired: 6

General characteristics
- Type: Minesweeper
- Displacement: 100 tons full load
- Length: 26 m (85 ft 4 in)
- Beam: 5.5 m (18 ft 1 in)
- Draught: 1.5 m (4 ft 11 in)
- Propulsion: Two diesel engines with 600 hp sustained and 2 shafts
- Speed: 12 knots (22 km/h; 14 mph)
- Range: 300 nmi (560 km; 350 mi) at 10 knots (19 km/h; 12 mph)
- Complement: 10
- Crew: 25
- Sensors & processing systems: MG-7 sonar
- Armament: 2 x twin 25 mm/80 guns

The Mahé-class minesweeper is a class of mid-1960s small Russian minesweepers designed to counter the threat posed by naval mines. All of them were derivatives of the Yevgenya-class minesweeper.

The Mahé class was designed with glass-reinforced plastic hulls built at Kolpino, USSR. All of the vessels were based at Kochi and undertook various operational commitments such as mine counter-measure exercises, harbour defence, visits to various minor ports, and search and rescue missions.

== Units ==
Ship Name	Hull No.	Homeport	Commission	Decommission	Builder
INS Mahé	M 83	Kochi	16 May 1983	15 May 2006	
INS Malvan	M 84	Kochi	16 May 1983	5 Jan 2003	
INS Mangrol	M 85	Kochi	16 May 1983	7 Apr 2004	
INS Malpe	M 86	Kochi	10 May 1984	4 Dec 2006	
INS Mulki	M 87	Kochi	10 May 1984	2003	
INS Magdala	M 88	Kochi	10 May 1984	February 2002	
