= Pauk-class corvette =

Class of Soviet patrol corvettes

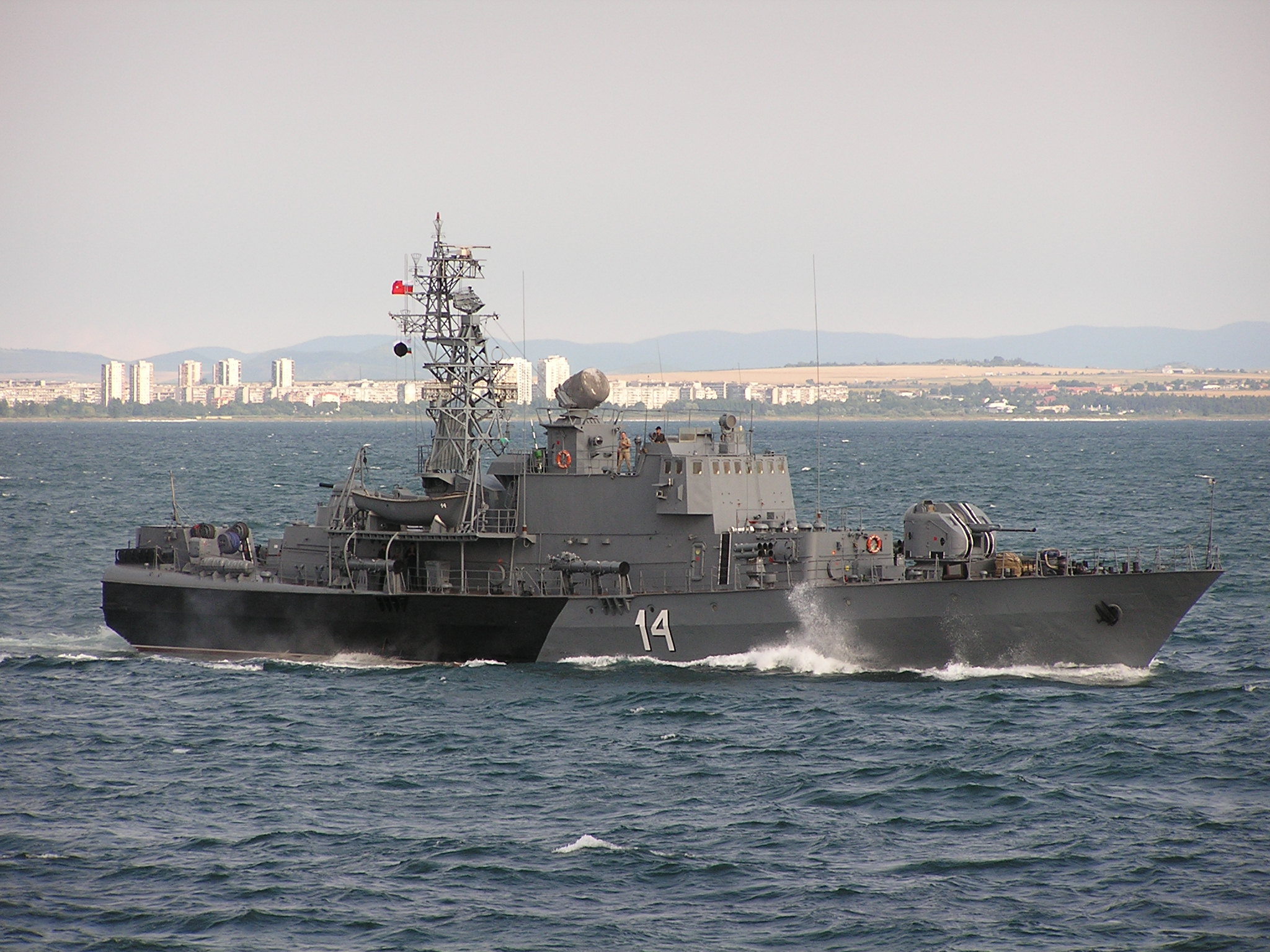
- Bulgarian Navy Pauk-class corvette Bodri

Class overview
- Name: Pauk class
- Builders: Vostochnaya Verf
- Operators: Soviet Navy; Russian Navy; Russian Coast Guard; Indian Navy; Bulgarian Navy; Cuban Revolutionary Navy; Ukrainian Sea Guard
- Preceded by: Poti class
- Subclasses: Abhay class
- Planned: 41
- Completed: 36
- Canceled: 5
- Active: 4?
- Retired: 32?
- Preserved: 1

General characteristics
- Type: Anti-submarine corvette
- Displacement: 500 long tons (508 t) standard, 580 long tons (589 t) full load
- Length: 57 m (187 ft)
- Beam: 9.4 m (30 ft 10 in)
- Draught: 2.4 m (7 ft 10 in)
- Propulsion: 2 shaft M504 diesels, 20,000 shp (14,914 kW)
- Speed: 28–34 knots (51.9 km/h/32.2 mph – 63 km/h/39.1 mph)
- Range: 1,650 nautical miles (3,056 km; 1,899 mi) at 14 kn (25.9 km/h; 16.1 mph)
- Complement: 40
- Sensors & processing systems: Radar: Spin Trough, Bass Tilt, Air surface search; Sonar: Medium frequency hull mounted and Bronza dipping sonar
- Electronic warfare & decoys: Vympel-R2 Electronic Warfare suite; Half Hat-B; PK-16 Decoy Launchers
- Armament: 1 SA-N-5 SAM (1x4); 1 × 76mm AK-176 gun; 1 × 30mm AK-630 gun; 2 × RBU-1200 anti submarine rocket launchers; 4 × 406 mm (16 in) anti submarine torpedo tubes; some ships have 2 × 533 mm (21 in) torpedo tubes

The Pauk class is the NATO reporting name for a class of small patrol corvettes built for the Soviet Navy and export customers between 1977 and 1989. The Russian designation is Project 1241.2 Molniya-2. These ships are designed for coastal patrol and inshore anti-submarine warfare. The design is the patrol version of the Tarantul class which is designated Project 1241.1, but is slightly longer and has diesel engines. The ships are fitted with a dipping sonar which is also used in Soviet helicopters.

The class saw moderate export success, with four ships sold to India as the Abhay class, two ships sold to Bulgaria, and one ship to Cuba. A further five ships were transferred to Ukraine after the fall of the USSR. There were plans for India to build more ships locally under license, but this was dropped in favour of the indigenous Kamorta class.

== Ships in class by country ==
=== Soviet Union / Russia ===
Name	Builder	Launched	Commissioned	Decommissioned	Status
MPK-140	Yaroslavl Shipyard	5 February 1979	31 December 1979	31 July 1996	Decommissioned
MPK-12 / PSKR-800 / Berkut	Vladivostok Shipyard	6 December 1979	28 November 1980	2000	Decommissioned
MPK-144	Yaroslavl Shipyard	12 January 1980	4 November 1980	10 April 2002	Decommissioned
MPK-60 / Komsomolec Bashkirii	Yaroslavl Shipyard	10 June 1980	31 December 1980	10 April 2002	Decommissioned
PSKR-801 / Berkut	Vladivostok Shipyard	6 March 1981	30 September 1981	2001	Decommissioned
PSKR-802 / Marten / Yaroslavl	Yaroslavl Shipyard	16 April 1981	20 September 1981	28 December 2008	Decommissioned
MPK-76	Yaroslavl Shipyard	8 June 1981	29 December 1981	10 April 2002	Decommissioned
PSKR-804 / Tolyatti	Yaroslavl Shipyard	18 February 1982	30 August 1982	2002	Decommissioned
PSKR-803 / Condor	Vladivostok Shipyard	6 May 1982	22 December 1982	2001	Decommissioned
MPK-93	Yaroslavl Shipyard	6 July 1982	25 December 1982	2012	Transferred to Ukrainian Navy as Uzhhorod in 1997; Decommissioned; Captured by Russia in 2014; Fate unknown
PSKR-806 / Kaliningrad	Yaroslavl Shipyard	18 February 1983	10 September 1983	2002	Decommissioned
PSKR-805 / Korshun	Vladivostok Shipyard	3 May 1983	28 October 1983	2007	Decommissioned
MPK-146	Yaroslavl Shipyard	12 June 1983	24 December 1983		Transferred to Bulgaria in 1989; In active service as Reshitelni
PSKR-813 / Grigory Kuropyatnikov	Yaroslavl Shipyard	18 January 1984	30 September 1984		Transferred to Ukraine in 1992; In active service with the Ukrainian Sea Guard
PSKR-808 / Grif	Yaroslavl Shipyard	24 May 1984	25 December 1984	28 December 2008	Decommissioned
PSKR-807 / Kobchik	Vladivostok Shipyard	19 June 1984	30 September 1984	2007	Decommissioned
MPK-116	Yaroslavl Shipyard	26 January 1985	9 September 1985	2014	Transferred to Ukraine in 1997 as Khmelnytskyi; Captured by Russia in 2014; Scrapped in 2023
MPK-124	Yaroslavl Shipyard	17 June 1985	18 December 1985		Transferred to Bulgaria in 1990; In active service as Bodri
PSKR-809 / Krechet	Vladivostok Shipyard	29 June 1985	30 September 1985	7 October 2008	Decommissioned
PSKR-810 / Nikolai Kapulnov	Yaroslavl Shipyard	8 January 1986	30 September 1086	2009	Decommissioned
PSKR-812 / Sokol	Vladivostok Shipyard	24 May 1986	30 September 1986		Active with the Russian Coast Guard's Pacific Fleet
PSKR-811 / Orlan	Yaroslavl Shipyard	14 June 1986	6 December 1986	20 February 2009	Decommissioned
PSKR-813	Yaroslavl Shipyard	18 September 1986	30 June 1987	2010	Transferred to Ukrainian Sea Guard as Poltava in 1992; Decommissioned; Captured by Russia in 2014; Ultimate fate unknown
PSRK-814 / Sarych	Yaroslavl Shipyard	24 January 1987	28 September 1987	20 February 2009	Decommissioned
PSKR-816 / Yastreb	Vladivostok Shipyard	29 April 1987	31 August 1987	2014	Decommissioned
PSKR-815	Yaroslavl Shipyard	30 May 1987	29 December 1987	2014	Transferred to Ukrainian Sea Guard as Grigoriy Gnatenko in 1992; Decommissioned; Captured by Russia in 2014; Used as target and scuttled in 2015-16
PSKR-815 (Plant No. 519) / Sobol / Cheboksary	Yaroslavl Shipyard	5 December 1987	10 September 1988	2017	Preserved as a museum ship, Cheboksary, Russia
MPK-211 / Abhay	Yaroslavl Shipyard	20 April 1988	10 March 1989	6 October 2025	Built for India as Abhay; Decommissioned
PSKR-818 / Nakhodka	Vladivostok Shipyard	31 May 1988	31 October 1988	2011	Decommissioned
PSKR-817 / Jaguar / Minsk	Yaroslavl Shipyard	8 July 1988	28 December 1988	2018	Decommissioned
MPK-3	Yaroslavl Shipyard	21 December 1988	1990		Built for Cuba as 321; In active service
MPK-218 / Ajay	Yaroslavl Shipyard	1989	24 January 1990	19 September 2022	Built for India as Ajay; Decommissioned
MPK-206 / Akshay	Yaroslavl Shipyard	9 January 1990	10 December 1990	3 June 2022	Built for India as Akshay; Decommissioned
MPK-208 / Agray	Yaroslavl Shipyard	20 July 1990	30 January 1991	27 January 2017	Built for India as Agray; Decommissioned
MPK-291 / Novorrossiysk	Yaroslavl Shipyard	23 April 1991	27 November 1991	2020	Decommissioned
MPK-292 / Kuban	Yaroslavl Shipyard	23 April 1991	27 November 1991	?	Listed as still in service with Russian Coast Guard in the Black Sea as of 2025

=== Foreign operators ===
Name	Hull Number	Commissioned	Decommissioned	Status
Bulgarian Navy
Reshitelni	13	September 1989		In active service
Bodri	14	December 1990		In active service
Cuban Revolutionary Navy
	321	May 1990		In active service
Indian Navy
Abhay	P33	10 March 1989	6 October 2025	Decommissioned
Ajay	P34	24 January 1990	19 September 2022	Decommissioned
Akshay	P35	10 December 1990	3 June 2022	Decommissioned
Agray	P36	30 January 1991	27 January 2017	Converted to trials ship in 2004 after RBU-1200 misfire; Decommissioned
Ukrainian Navy
Uzhhorod	U207	1997	2012	Decommissioned; Captured by Russia in 2014; Fate unknown
Khmelnytski	U208	1997	2014	Decommissioned; Captured by Russia in 2014; Scrapped in 2023
Ukrainian Sea Guard
Grigory Kuropyatnikov	BG-50	1992		In active service
Poltava	BG-51	1992	2010	Decommissioned; Captured by Russia in 2014; Ultimate fate unknown
Grygoriy Gnatenko	BG-52	1992	2014	Decommissioned; Captured by Russia in 2014; Used as target and scuttled in 2015-16

== See also ==
- List of ships of the Soviet Navy
- List of ships of Russia by project number

== Gallery ==
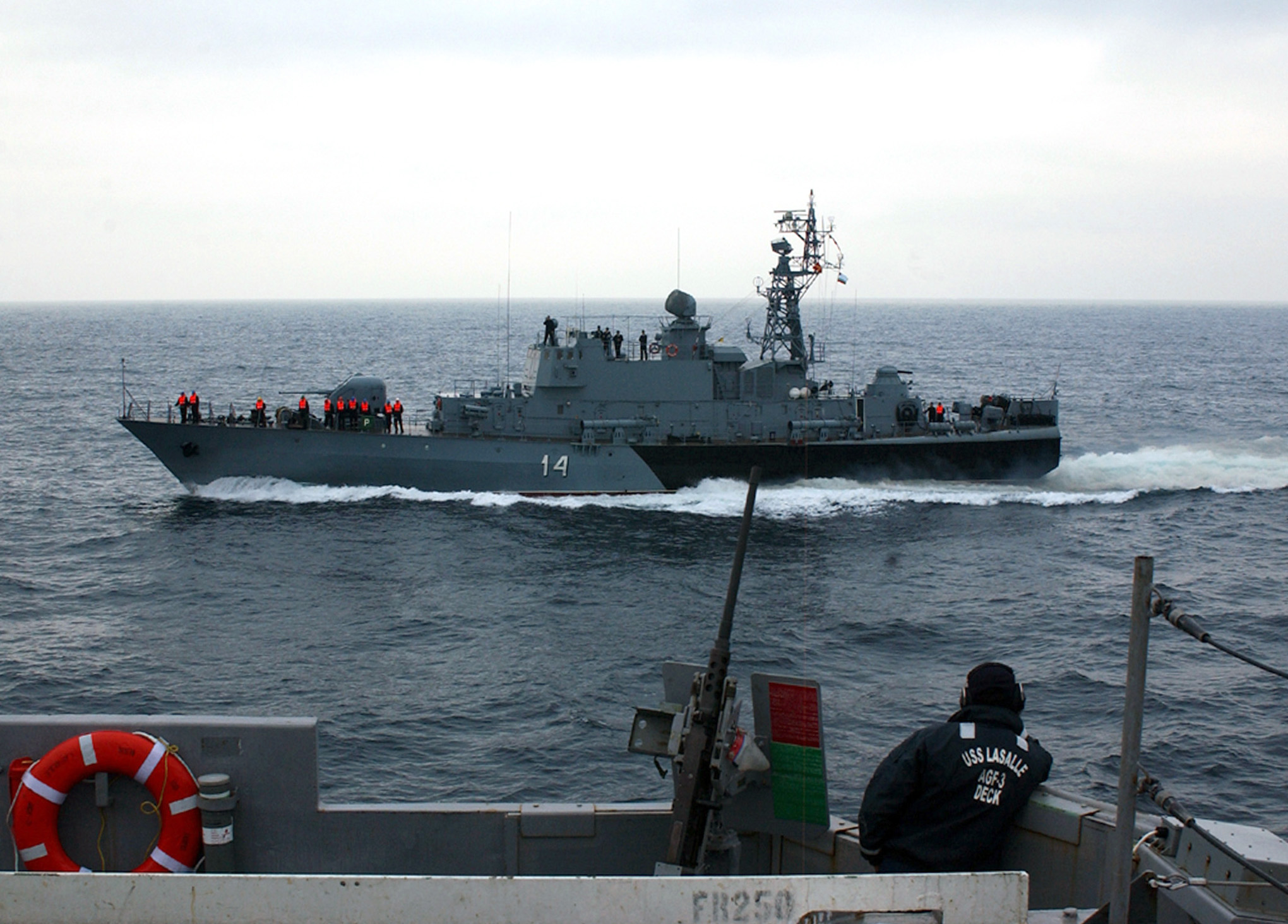

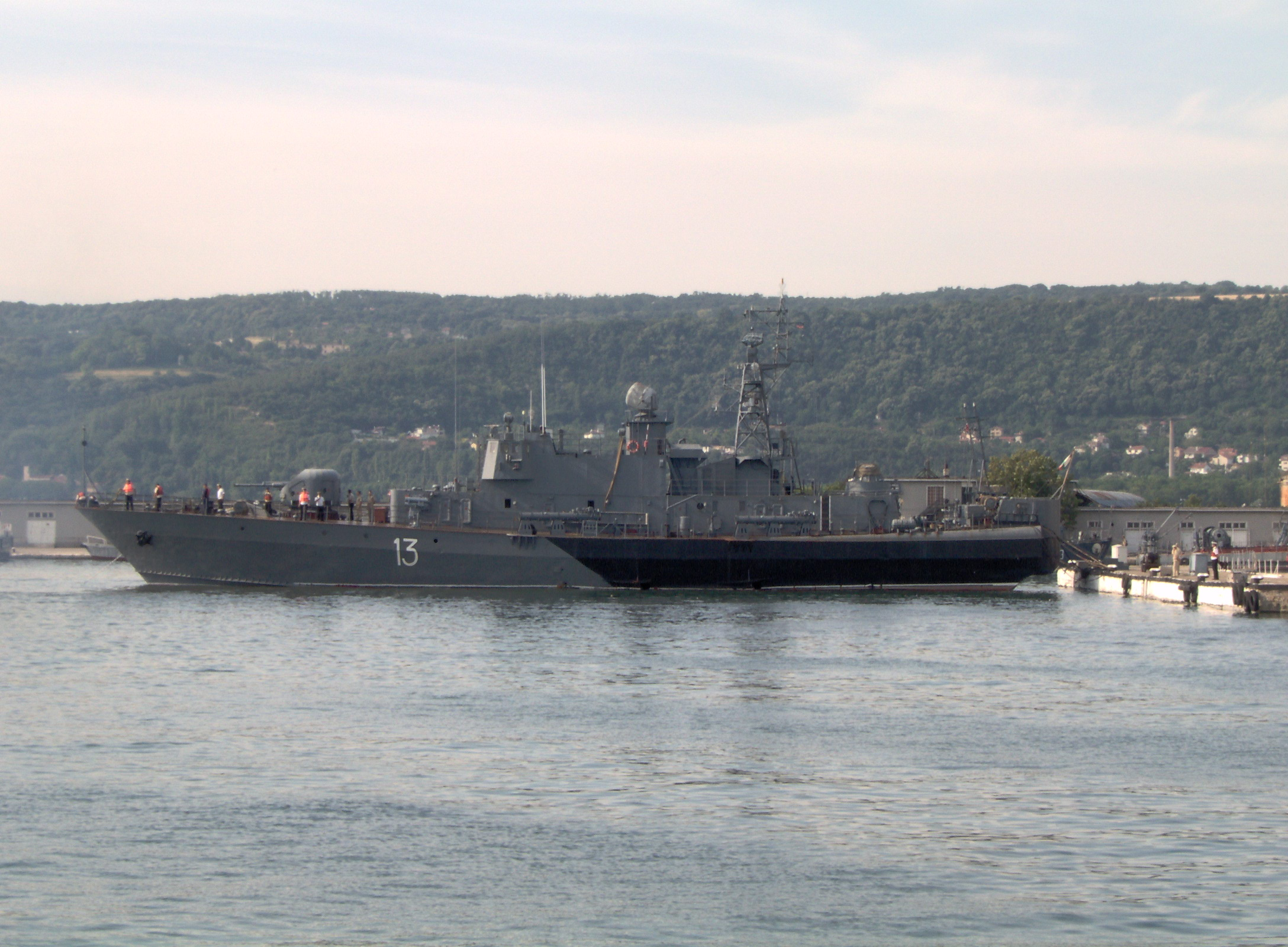
