= Inhul Bridge =

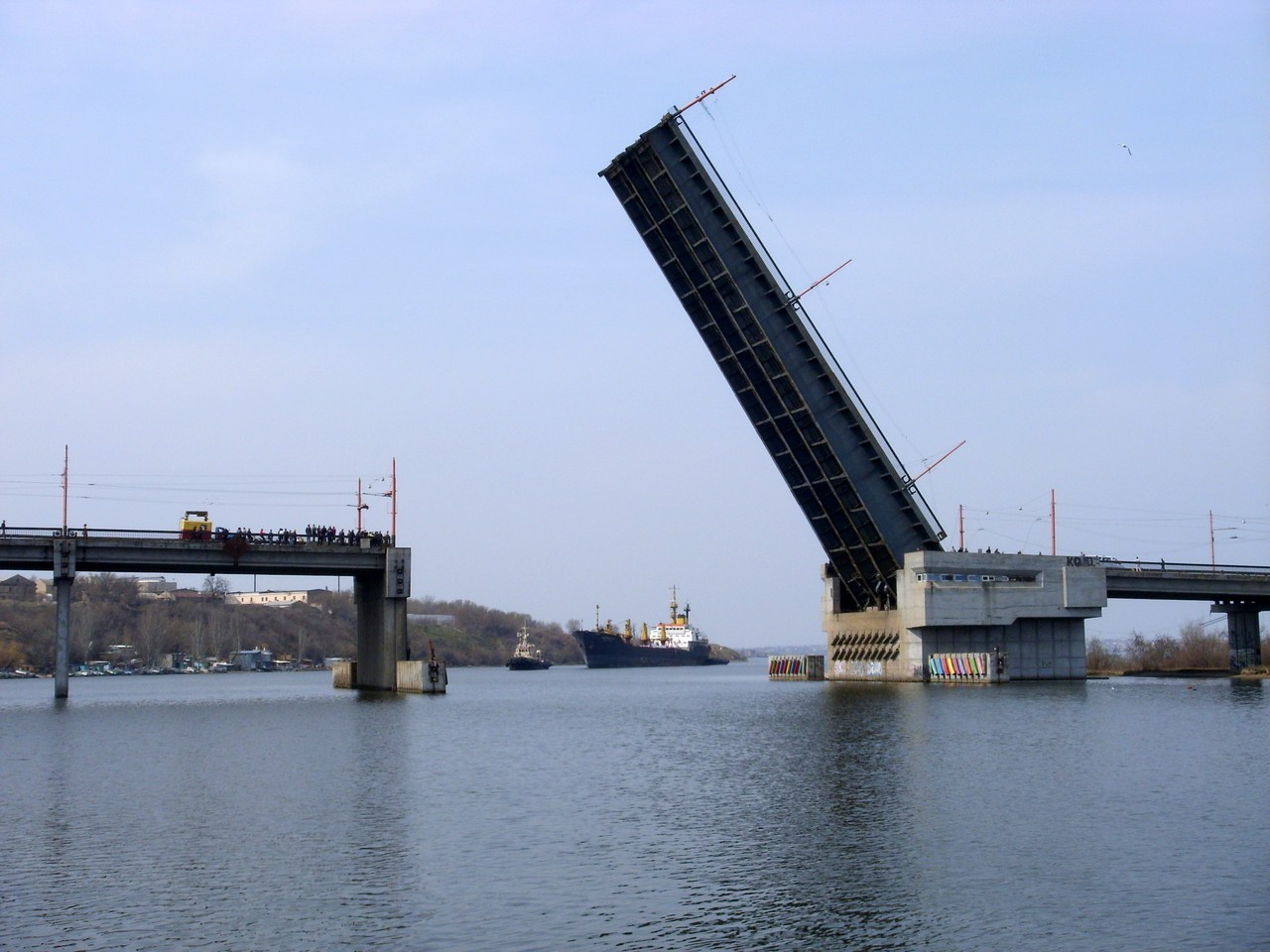
- Inhul Bridge in a dismantled state
- Coordinates: 46°58′47″N 31°59′22″E

Location
- Interactive map of Inhul Bridge

The Inhul Bridge (also known as Inhulskyi Bridge, Ukrainian: Інгульський міст, Інгульний міст) is a moveable bridge over the Inhul River in the city of Mykolaiv, Ukraine. It is designed to allow the passage of vessels from the Mykolaiv Shipbuilding Plant.

== Location ==
The bridge connects the city center, starting from Arkasivska Street, with the Solyani residential area, where it continues as the Heroes of Ukraine Avenue.

== Technical Specifications ==
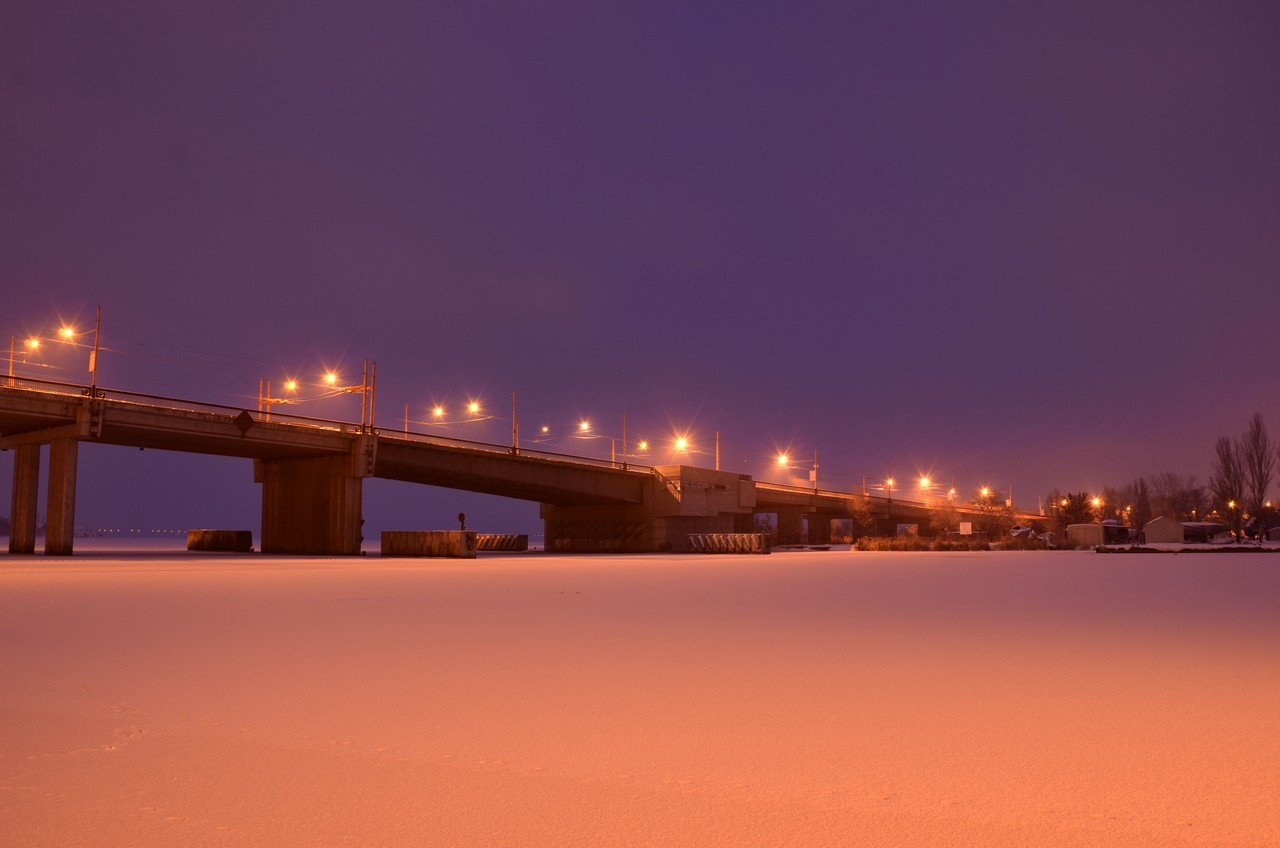
Inhul Bridge in winter at night

General characteristics:

- The total length of the Inhul Bridge is 422 meters, and its width is 18.5 meters. It features four traffic lanes and two pedestrian sidewalks, each 2.25 meters wide.
- The movable span provides a clearance of 55 meters and a height of 60 meters, operated by hydraulic cylinders.
- Design layout: 5 spans of 33 meters each + a 76.25-meter draw span + 7 spans of 33 meters each.
- The foundations are based on 0.6-meter diameter shell piles.
- The piers are of composite monolithic construction.

Span structures:

- The viaduct section consists of 33-meter-long precast prestressed reinforced concrete beams.
- The main river span, 76.25 meters in length, is a steel single-leaf bascule span with a counterweight comparable to the weight of the movable span, allowing the bridge to be opened even manually.

Until 1996, the Inhul Bridge had the largest draw span in Europe. It is now surpassed by the bridge in Rotterdam by less than 6 meters.

== Construction history ==
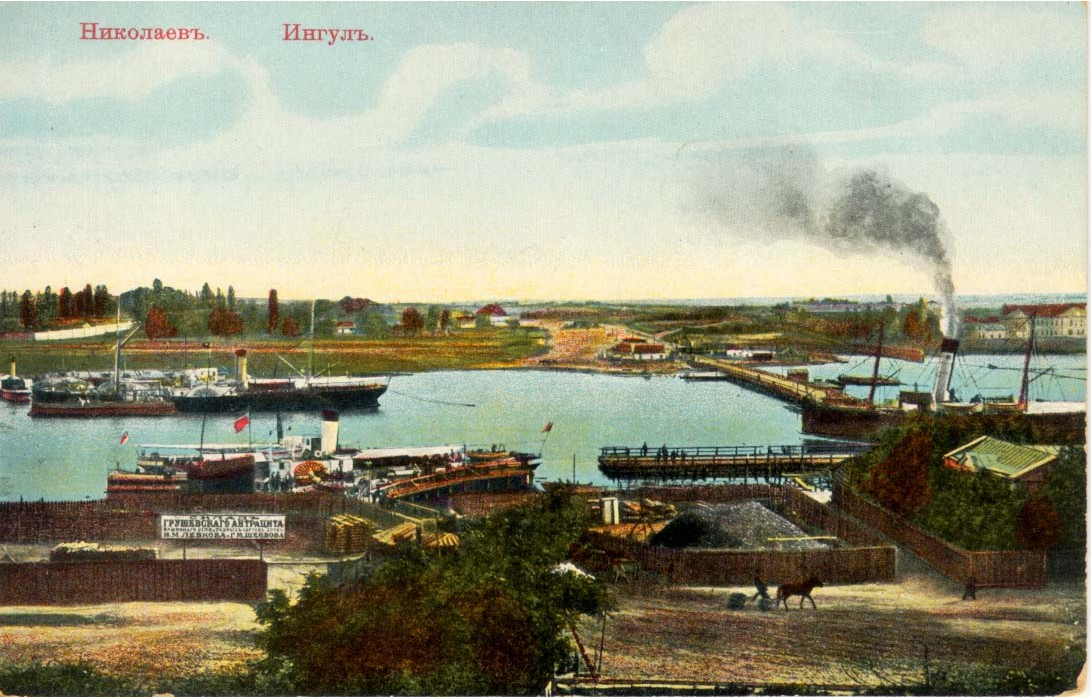
View of Inhul and the old Inhul Bridge in Mykolaiv on an old postcard

The first bridge across the Inhul River was built between 1792 and 1795 as a pontoon bridge laid on floating pontoons.

The current bridge was constructed between 1974 and 1980. The Inhul Bridge lies along the route used by vessels heading to the docks of the Shipbuilding Plant named after the 61 Communards. The bridge was designed as a drawbridge specifically to allow the passage of ships for repair or construction.

The official opening of the bridge took place on 6 January 1981 in the presence of city authorities, the press, and local residents. The Inhul Bridge is 422 meters long and nearly 19 meters wide. It features pedestrian walkways on both sides of the structure and a roadway with a trolleybus line. The bridge connects the Solyani residential district with the outskirts of Mykolaiv. The movable section of the bridge has a vertical, single-leaf bascule design and is 76 meters in length.

The bridge was designed by the Leningrad-based design institute Lengipromstroymost and the Kyiv branch of Soyuzdorpoyekt. It was built by Bridge Detachment No. 444 of Mostobud No. 1 (now Bridge Unit No. 73) under the supervision of Lenin Prize laureate Lev Heorhiyovych Karelia, who had previously overseen the construction of the Varvarivskyi Bridge in Mykolaiv.

The bridge crossing spans the Inhul River from Arkasivska Street to Cape Strilka and, via a viaduct with a sharp turn, leads to the Heroes of Ukraine Avenue (then Kyiv Highway). It visually "cuts through" the Park of Victory located beyond the river, dividing it into two parts. The two separated sections of the park are connected by an underground pedestrian passage, which became the first—and for many years the only—underground crossing in Mykolaiv.

On 31 December 1982, trolleybus service was launched across the Inhul Bridge. A new trolleybus route No. 6 was introduced, connecting the People's Garden Park (known as Petrovskyi Park until 2016) with the "Oblsilhosptekhnika" enterprise. For this, special movable components of the trolleybus catenary system had to be installed on the bridge to accommodate the opening of the draw span. Prior to this, similar infrastructure had only been used on the drawbridges across the Neva River in Leningrad.

== Incidents ==
In the mid-1980s, a floating vessel collided with the span adjacent to the drawbridge section, causing mechanical damage. Traffic on the bridge was halted for three days, with vehicles redirected via the bridge of the Mykolaiv Shipbuilding Plant (the old Inhul Bridge). One section of the span had to be replaced. The damaged segment was simply lowered into the river by floating cranes near the embankment at the site of the former Wild Beach.

In the 1990s, the lifting mechanism was accidentally triggered, causing the bridge to begin opening unexpectedly. As a temporary safety measure, concrete blocks were placed on the draw span to prevent unintended operation; these blocks were removed by crane during scheduled bridge openings.

On 4 March 2008, while a vessel built for Spanish clients was being guided out of the harbor of the Mykolaiv Shipbuilding Plant, the Inhul Bridge, which was in the open position, suddenly began to descend. The crews of both tugboats towing the vessel took emergency action to stop it. The rear tugboat managed to reverse at full power, narrowly avoiding a collision with the bridge. The incident was caused by a malfunction in the mechanism due to a hydraulic failure caused by an oil leak.

On 16 September 2015, an attempt to open the Inhul Bridge failed during a scheduled passage for the missile boat Pryluky and the maritime patrol vessel Hryhoriy Kuropyatnykov, en route to the harbor of the state-owned Mykolaiv Shipbuilding Plant. The incident occurred due to improperly conducted repair work on the bridge's asphalt surface. Workers had not removed the old asphalt before laying new material on top, resulting in an overload of the movable section. After the excess ballast was removed, the bridge was successfully opened by the morning of the following day.

== Gallery ==
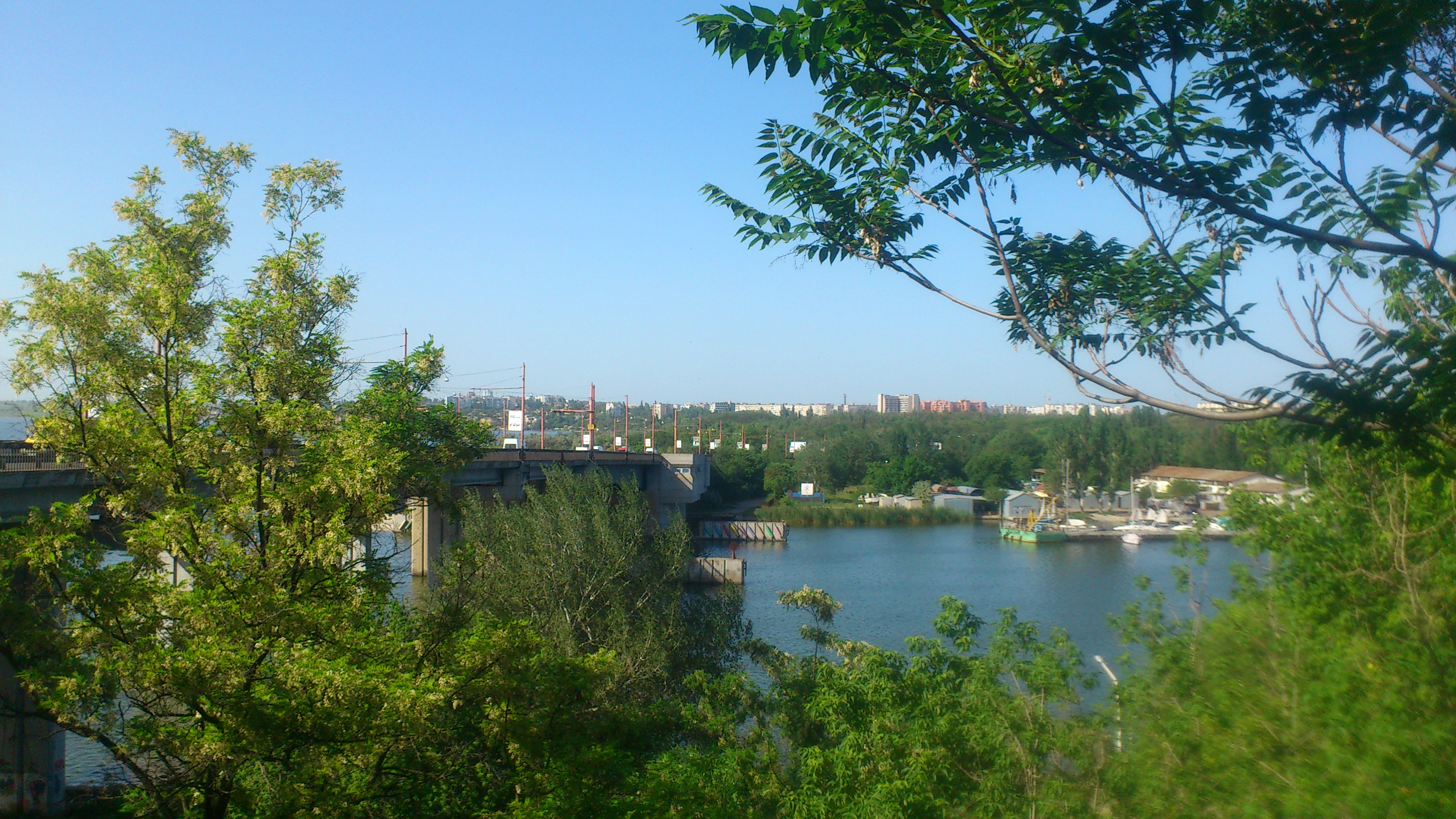
Inhul Bridge from Flotsky Boulevard

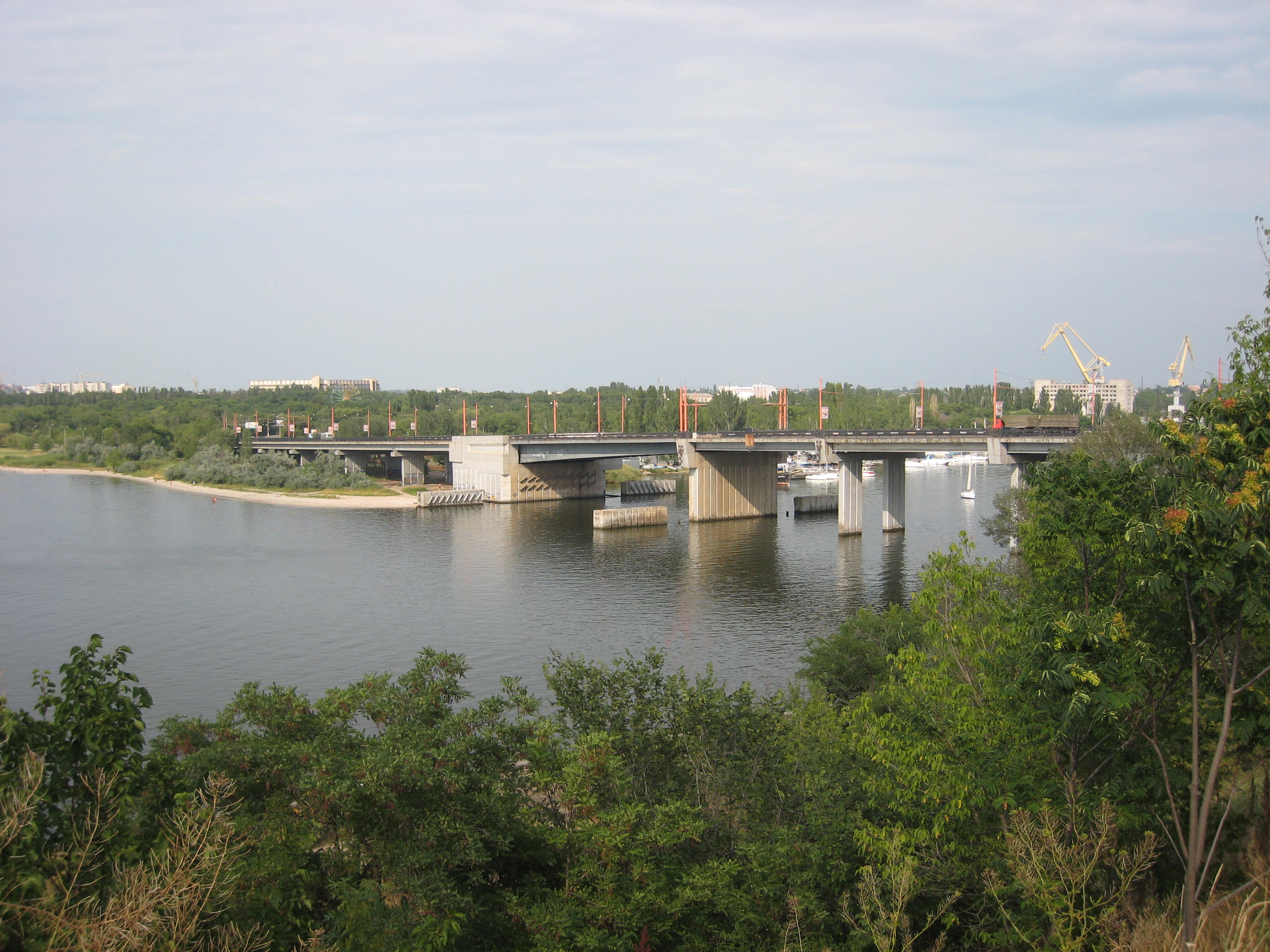
Inhul Bridge, July 2008

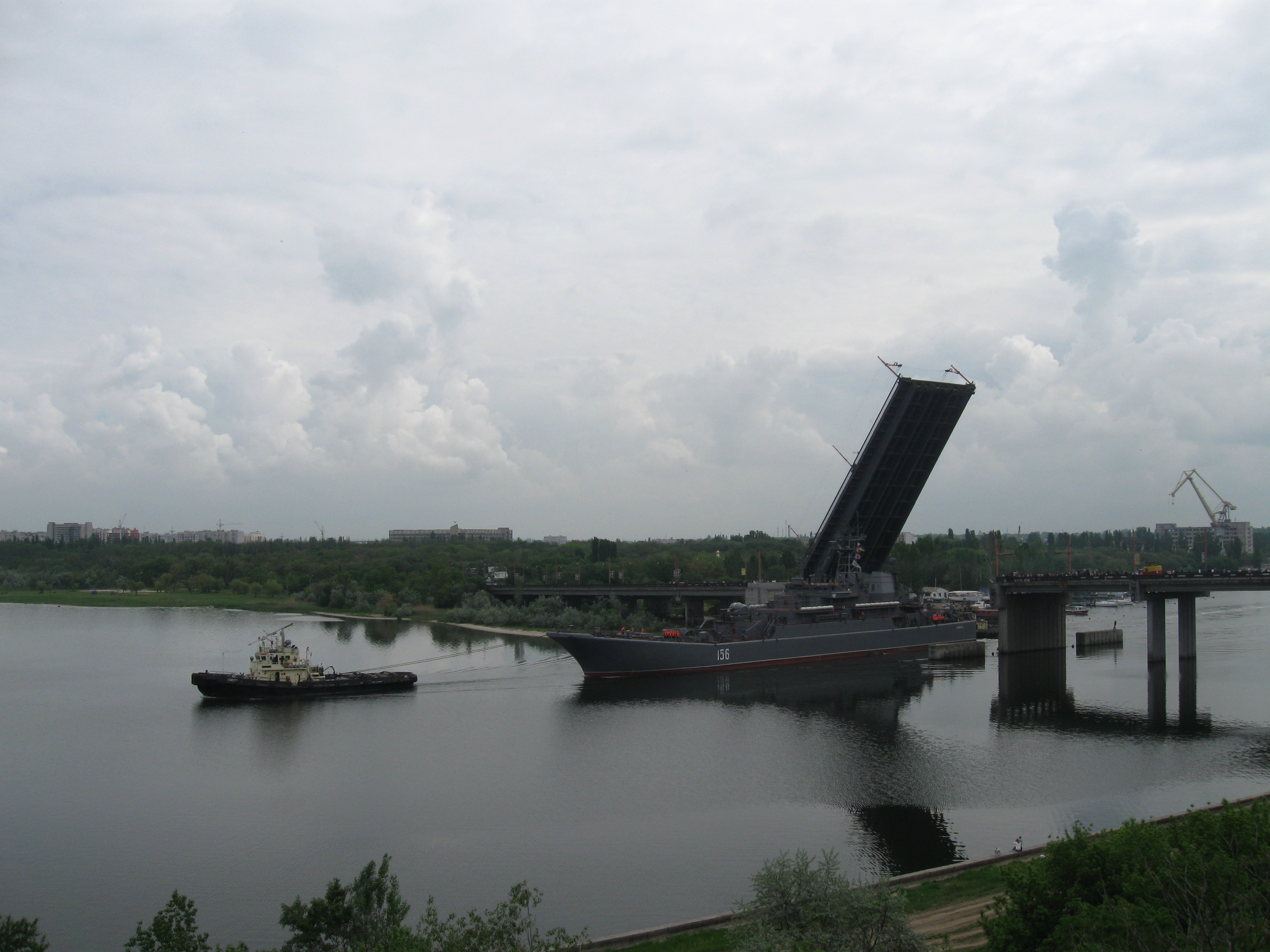
The large landing ship Yamal passes under the Inhul Bridge
