= Typhoon Weapon Station =

Israeli remote weapon station

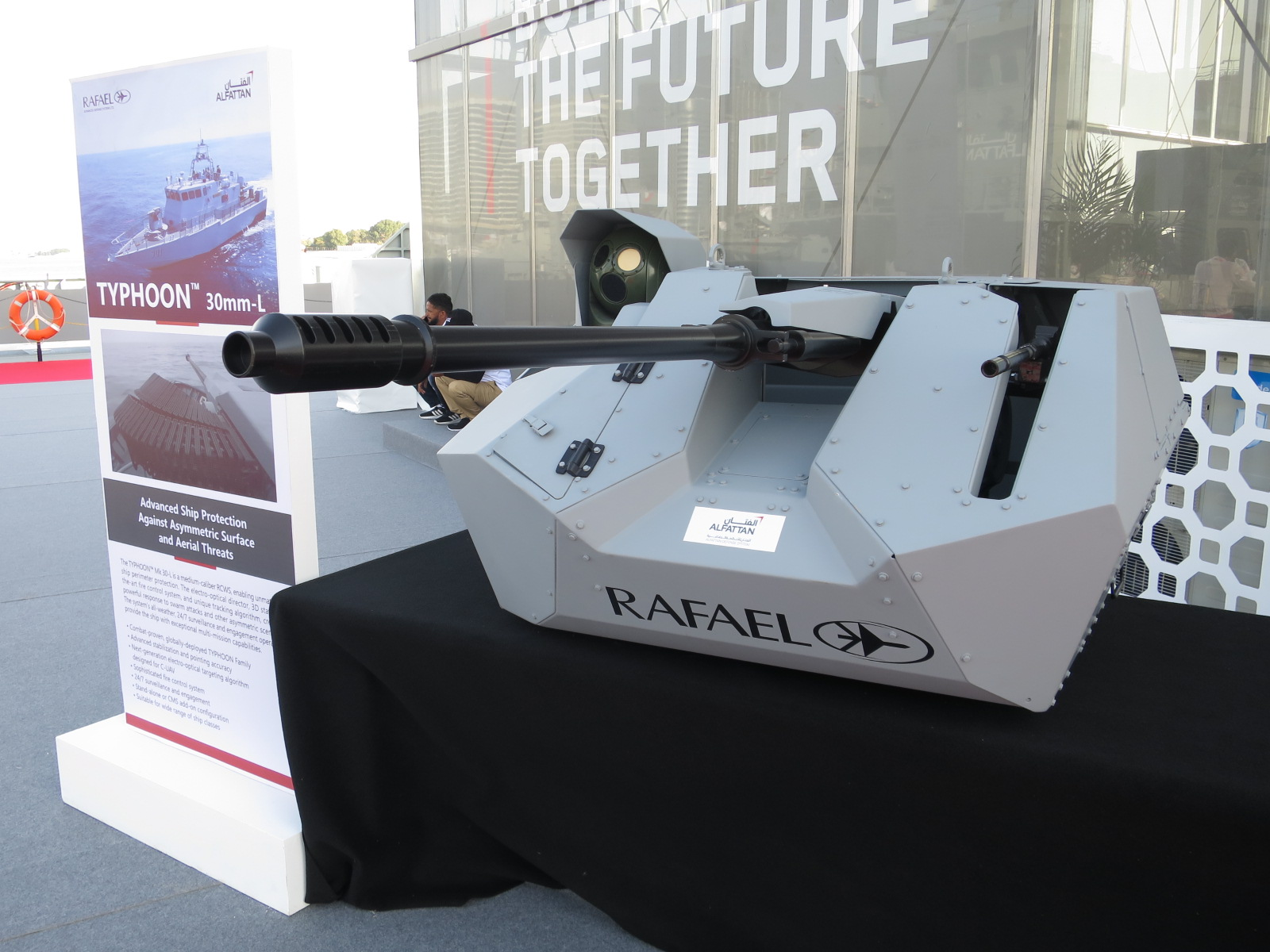
- Static Typhoon 30mm gun in NAVDEX 2023.
- Type: Remote controlled weapon station
- Place of origin: Israel

Service history
- In service: 1997–present
- Used by: See Operators

Production history
- Variants: See Variants

The Typhoon is a type of remote weapon station manufactured by Rafael Advanced Defense Systems of Israel, and it shares similar design principles and common technologies with Samson Remote Controlled Weapon Station (Samson RCWS), a land-based system manufactured by the same developer. Like Samson RCWS, Typhoon is also multi-configurable.

The Typhoon, and its lightweight variant, Mini Typhoon, are used by the Israeli Navy, Indian Navy, Philippine Navy, Royal Australian Navy, Royal New Zealand Navy, the Republic of Singapore Navy, Sri Lankan Navy and Singapore's Police Coast Guard.

== Overview ==
The first Typhoon, the Mk-23, was released in 1997. The weapon is mounted on a stabilized deck mounting which allows it to remain on target as the platform beneath it moves. The stabilizer has an accuracy of 0.25 milliradians (mrad), allowing it to keep the weapon aimed to within 250 millimetres (9.8 in) on a target 1,000 metres (3,300 ft) away.

The mounting does not penetrate the platform, making it relatively simple to fit the weapon to ships. Typhoon can use sights attached to the weapon mount or it can receive inputs from an independent Electro-Optical Detector (EOD) or Fire Control Radar (FCR). Using its own sight the Typhoon system can provide firing solutions entirely without outside assistance, allowing it to function fully independently.

The cannon system mounted can be an ATK, Oerlikon, Mauser or Giat model in the 20–30 mm caliber range. Between 160 and 210 rounds are carried on the mounting, depending on the caliber. The mount can traverse 120° to either side and elevate between -12.5° and 40.5°. The weight of a complete system is between 690 and 750 kilograms (1,520 and 1,650 lb) without ammunition, depending on the guns and sensors mounted.

By 2006, more than 120 Typhoon systems had been ordered.

== Variants ==
=== Mini Typhoon ===
Mini Typhoon is a lightweight, remote-controlled weapon station based on the Typhoon. It can be fitted with a 12.7 mm (.50) machine gun, a 7.62 mm machine gun, or a 40 mm grenade launcher, with a magazine of up to 230 rounds. The system has an accuracy rating of 0.5 mrad, weighs between 140 and 170 kilograms (310 and 370 lb), depending on the weapon fitted, and can be installed without structural penetration of a ship's deck. The mini Typhoon is also mounted on the Protector USV (unmanned surface vehicle) as the Mk49 Mod 0.

=== Typhoon Mk-30c ===
Typhoon Mk-30c is a new variant equipped with the 30 mm Mk44 Bushmaster II and 200 ready use rounds.

== Operators ==
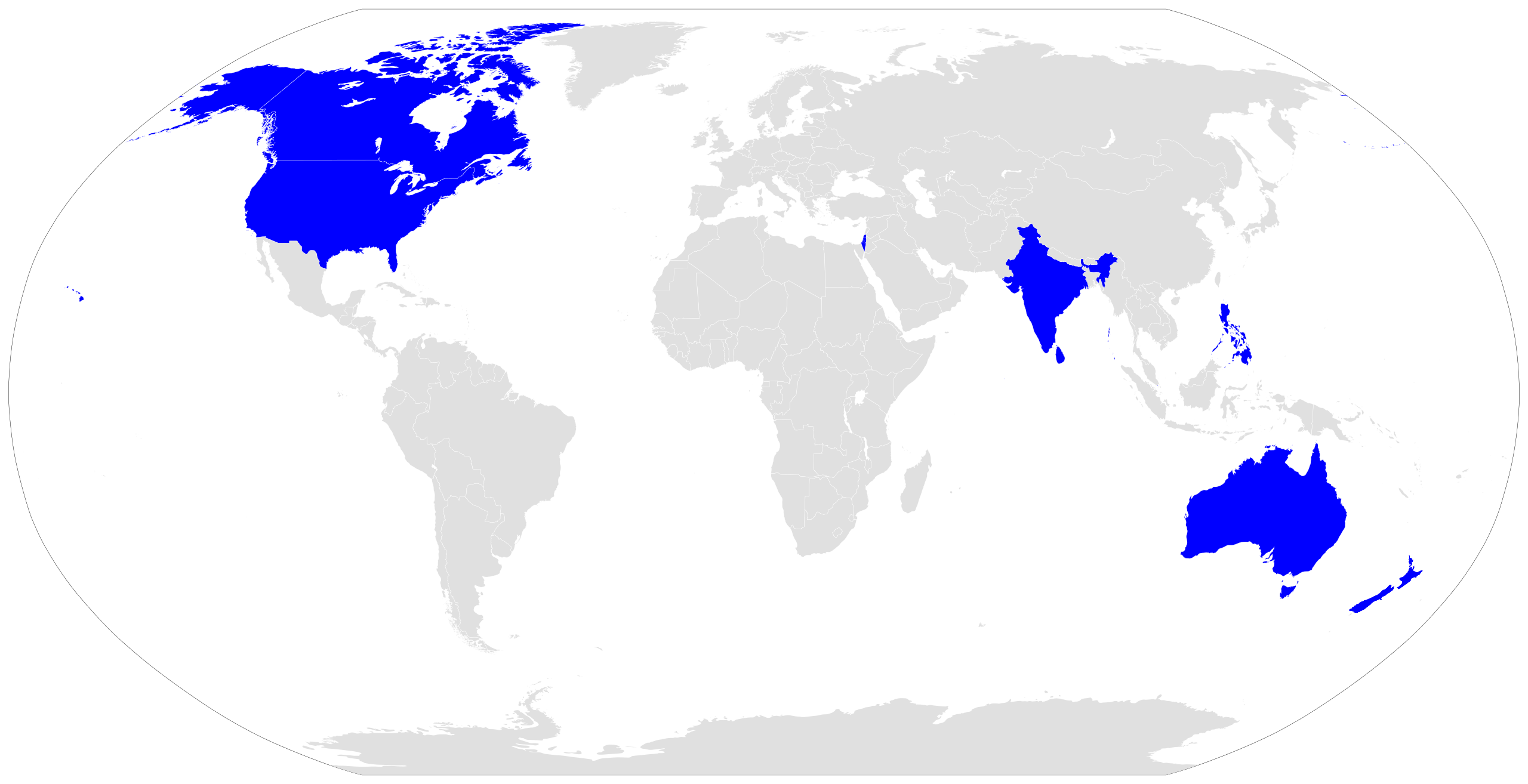
Map with Typhoon operators in blue.

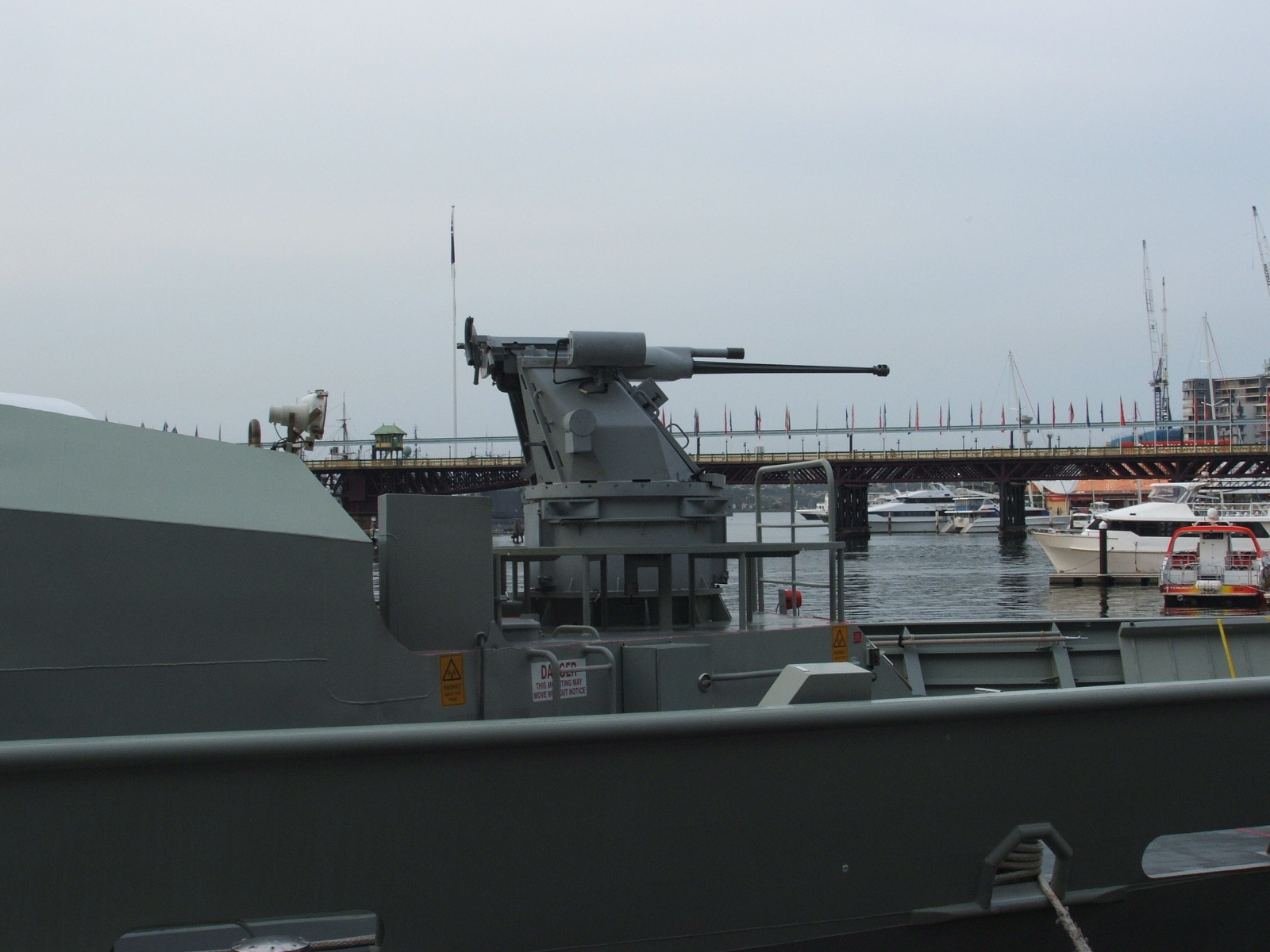
The Typhoon Mounting the 25mm M242 Bushmaster on board the Australian ship HMAS Armidale.

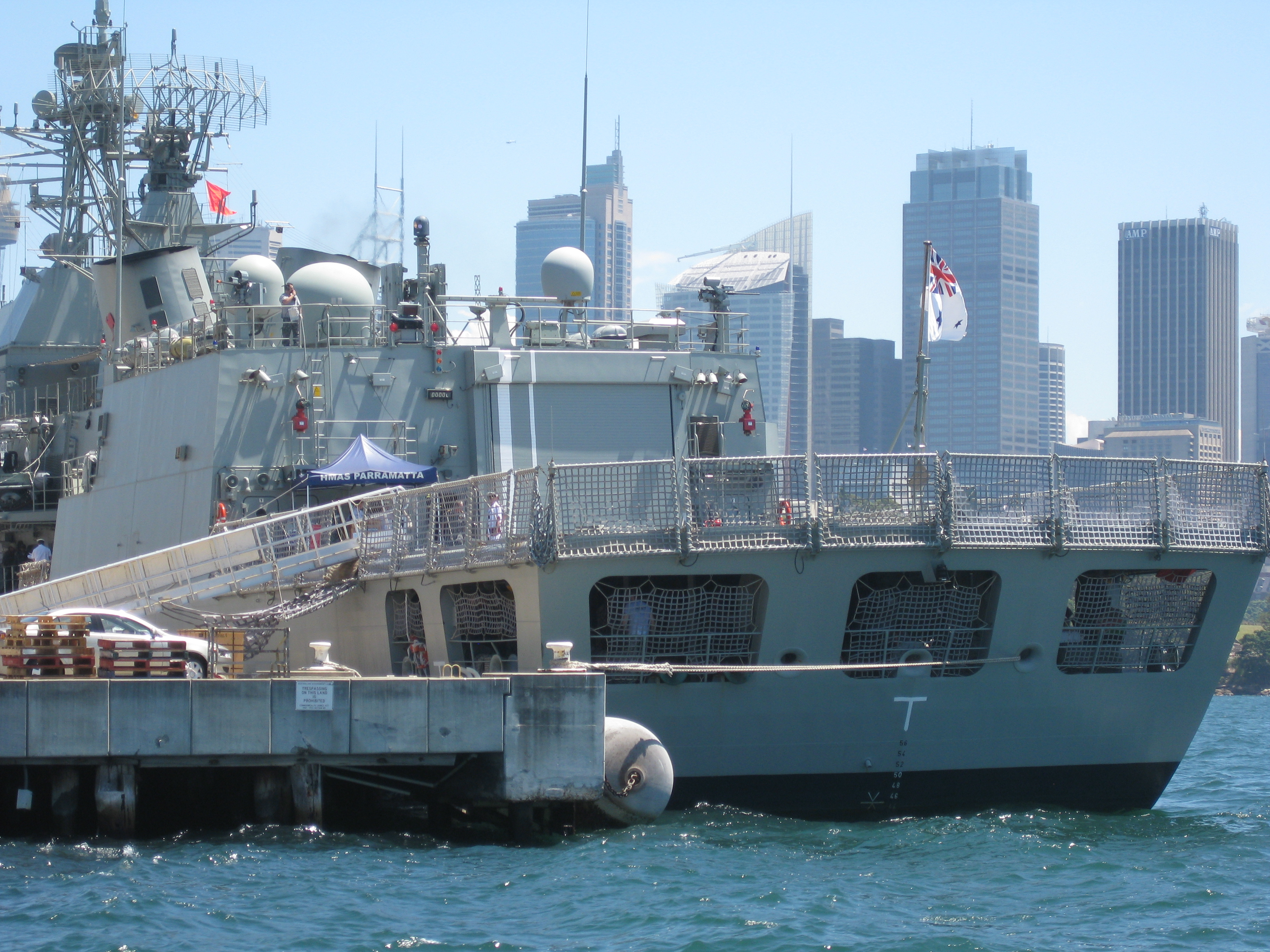
Stern view of HMAS Parramatta in January 2010. Note the two Mini Typhoon mounts fitted one each side of the hangar roof.

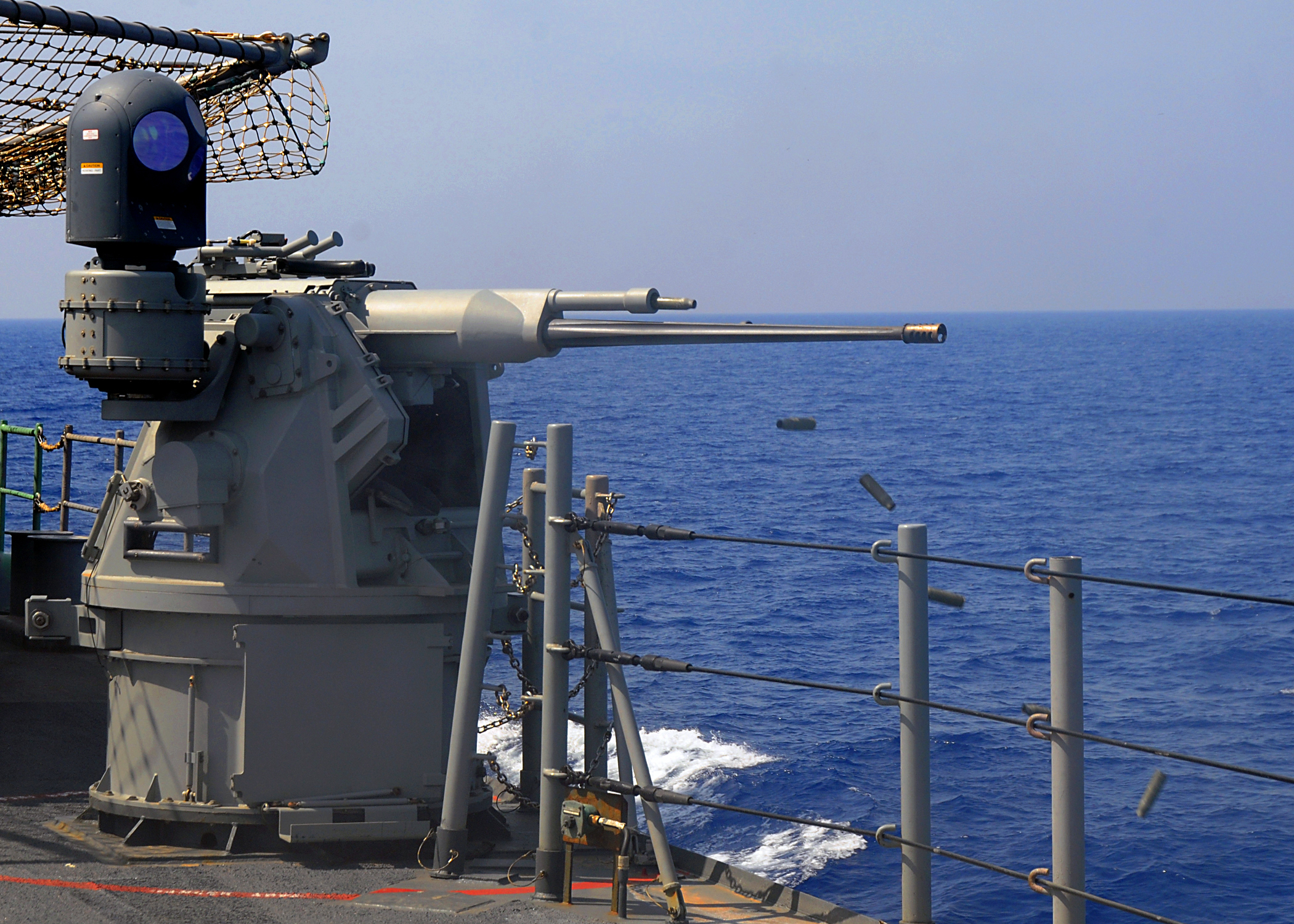
Mk38 Mod2 on board Ticonderoga-class cruiser USS Vella Gulf

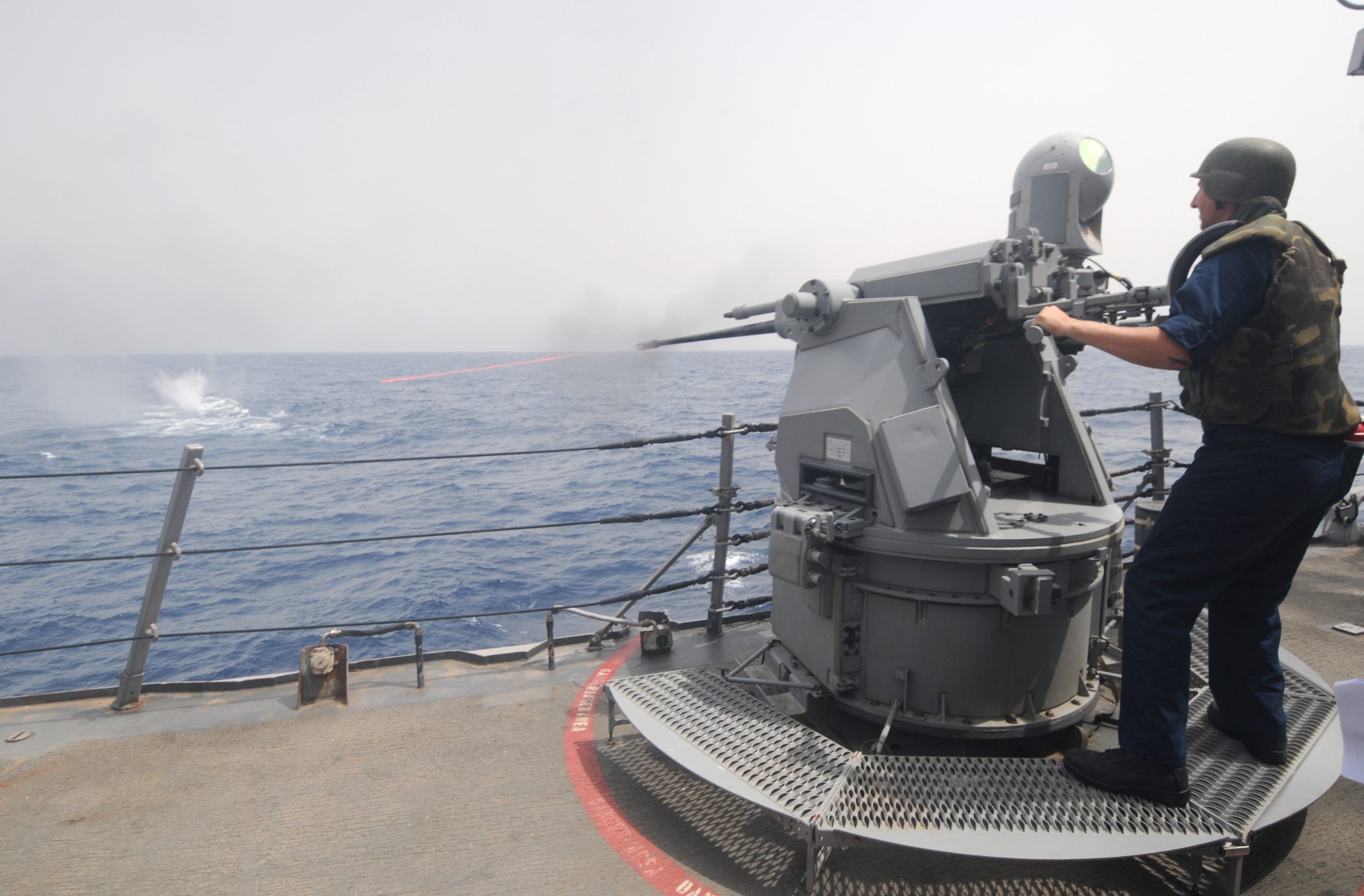
Manual operation mode.

=== Current operators ===
Australia

- Adelaide-class frigate (retired) – Mini Typhoon as a temporary mount for deployments to the Middle East.
- Arafura-class offshore patrol vessel
- Armidale-class patrol boat – 25 mm M242 Bushmaster
- Anzac-class frigate – Mini Typhoon as a temporary mount for deployments to the Middle East.
- Canberra-class landing helicopter dock
- Hobart-class destroyer – 25 mm M242 Bushmaster
- Supply-class replenishment oiler – 25 mm M242 Bushmaster

Canada

- Halifax-class frigate - Mini Typhoon as mount.
- Harry DeWolf-class offshore patrol vessel - Mk 38 Mod 2 as main gun

India

- Super Dvora Mk II-class patrol boat

Israel - with M242 Bushmasters

- Shaldag-class patrol boat
- Super Dvora Mk II-class patrol boat
- Super Dvora Mk III-class patrol boat
- Sa'ar 4.5-class missile boat

Maldives

- Colombo-class FACs

New Zealand

- Anzac-class frigate – Mini Typhoon as a permanent mount with M2 Browning machine guns
- Protector-class offshore patrol vessel – 1 x 25 mm
- HMNZS Aotearoa - Mini Typhoon as a permanent mount

Philippines

- Del Pilar-class offshore patrol vessel – Mk.38 Mod. 2 & 3
- Multipurpose Assault Craft – Mini Typhoon and Typhoon MLS-ER
- Nestor Acero-class FAIC

Singapore

- Victory-class multi-role combat vessel - Mk 30-c
- Independence-class littoral mission vessel - 1x 25mm Mk 38 Mod 2
- Sentinel-class maritime security and response vessels - 1x 25mm Mk 38 Mod 2
- Endurance-class landing platform dock – 2× 25mm Mk 38 Mod 2 (mounted amidships on port and starboard side)
- Formidable-class frigate Mk 38 Mod 2
- Bedok-class mine countermeasures vessel – Mk 25
- Protector USV – Mini Typhoon Mk49 Mod0
- New Coastal Patrol Craft (NCPC) for the Police Coast Guard.

Sri Lanka

- Saryu-class advanced offshore patrol vessels – 2× 30 mm Mk44 Bushmaster II (mounted amidships on port and starboard side)
- Colombo class FACs
- Shaldag-class patrol boat
- Super Dvora Mk II-class patrol boat
- Super Dvora Mk III-class patrol boat

United States

- Typhoon Weapon System has been selected by the US Navy, designated Mk 38 Mod 2, and provided by the US-located branch of the UK-headquartered company BAE Systems teamed with Rafael. Following upgrades which expanded the ships it could be mounted on, improved its optics, and added a co-axial 7.62mm machine gun, it received the designation Mk 38 Mod 3.
- Mini-Typhoon selected by the US Navy as the Remote Operated Small Arms Mount (ROSAM), designated Mk 49 Mod 0, and a later model Mk 49 Mod 1. The combination Spike missile/12.7mm armed variant has been tested on an unmanned vessel.
