= Super Dvora Mk II-class patrol boat =

Class of naval patrol boats

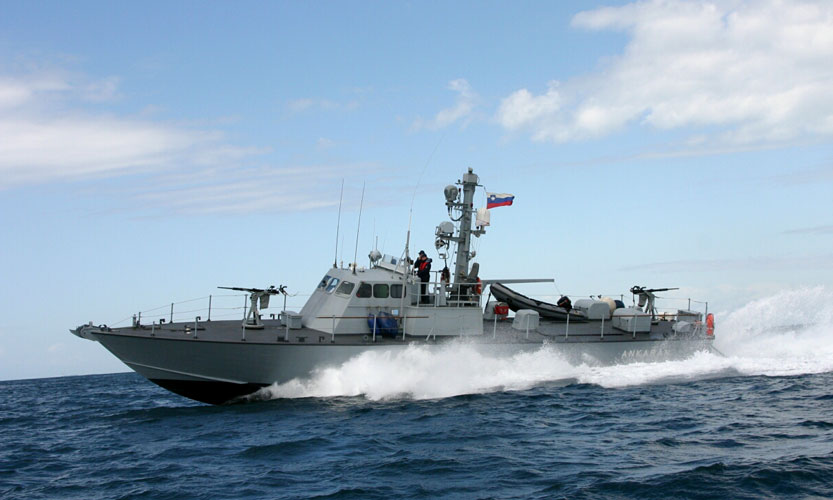
- Super Dvora Mk II-class HPL-21 Ankaran of the Slovenian Navy

Class overview
- Name: Super Dvora Mark II class
- Builders: IAI-Ramta
- Operators: See Operators
- Preceded by: Dvora class
- Succeeded by: Super Dvora Mk III class
- In commission: 1996
- Planned: 23
- Completed: 23
- Active: 14 or 15
- Lost: 1 or 2
- Retired: 5 or 6

General characteristics
- Type: Fast patrol boat
- Displacement: 60 tons full load
- Length: 25.4 m (83 ft) (incl. ASD platform)
- Beam: 5.67 m (18.6 ft)
- Draught: 1.1 m (3.6 ft)
- Installed power: 4,570 hp (3,410 kW)
- Propulsion: 2 × diesel engines; 2 × Arneson ASD-16 articulating surface drives.
- Speed: 45–52 knots (83–96 km/h) (max)
- Range: 700 nautical miles (1,300 km) at 42 knots (78 km/h)
- Armament: 1 × Typhoon 25-30 mm stabilized cannon/Oerlikon 20 mm cannon; 2 × 12.7 mm machine guns

The Super Dvora Mark II-class patrol boats is a high-speed class of patrol boats meant for a variety of naval missions from typical off-shore coastal patrol mission profiles to high-speed, high-maneuver littoral warfare. Built by Israel Aerospace Industries for the Israeli Sea Corps, the Super Dvora Mark II is the successor to the Dvora-class fast patrol boats. The Super Dvora Mark IIs have been employed by the Sri Lanka Navy to counter LTTE operations at sea.

== Design and construction ==
25.4 metres (83 ft) in length, the Super Dvora II has a marine aluminum alloy planing hull in order to maintaining high standards of sea-keeping, maneuverability and static/dynamic intact/damaged stability in adverse environments.

=== Armament ===
Originally the main armament of the Super Dvora Mark II design was the Oerlikon 20 mm cannon which were manually operated. At present all Super Dvora Mark II types have been modified to allow for the installation of Typhoon 25-30 mm stabilized cannon which can be slaved to state-of the art mast-mounted, day/night, long-range electro-optic systems. In addition to its main armament, Super Dvora Mark IIs carry heavy or light machine guns, depending on the operational requirements.

Sri Lankan Navy Super Dvora Mark IIs carry additional weapon systems such as Automatic Grenade Launchers, GPMGs & HMGs.

== Operators ==
Eritrea

- Eritrean Navy (6 procured, all in service)

India

- Indian Navy (5 procured, 2 in service, 3 decommissioned)
  - INFAC T-82 — commissioned on 9 October 2003 at Naval Dockyard (Mumbai) {ND(Mbi)} with her motto, Stealth and Strike. The boat regularly conducted multiple search and rescue operations, submarine escort duties as well as coastal interdiction missions. As per earlier confirmation, T-82 was decommissioned on 6 October 2025 during sunset along with INS Abhay, the final active Abhay-class corvette. Vice Admiral Krishna Swaminathan, the Flag Officer Commanding-in-Chief Western Naval Command (FOC-IN-C WNC), was the chief guest of the ceremony while attendees included the commissioning crew of the vessels, former Commanding Officers and senior dignitaries. The ships were under the command of Lieutenant Commander Adishesh Mishra and Commander Abhay Kumar Singh, respectively.

Israel

- Israeli Navy (4 procured, 2 in service, 2 decommissioned)

Slovenia

- Slovenian Navy (1, named Ankaran, in service)

Sri Lanka

- Sri Lanka Navy (6 procured, 4 in service, 2 sunk)

Preceded by Dvora	Dvora series	Succeeded by Super Dvora Mk III
