= Abhay-class corvette =

Class of modified Pauk class Corvettes of Indian navy

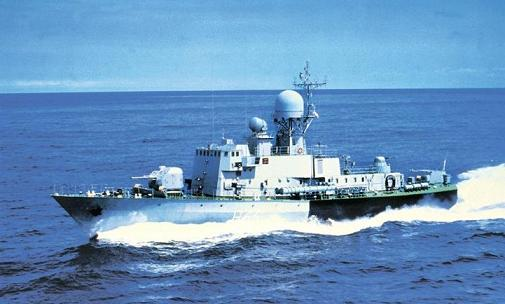
- An Abhay-class corvette underway

Class overview
- Name: Abhay class
- Operators: Indian Navy
- Preceded by: Durg class
- Succeeded by: Veer class by precedence; ASW-SWC by role
- In commission: 1989 – 2025
- Planned: 4
- Completed: 4
- Retired: 4

General characteristics
- Type: Corvette
- Displacement: 485 short tons (440 t)
- Length: 58.5 m (192 ft)
- Beam: 10.2 m (33 ft)
- Draught: 3.4 m (11 ft)
- Propulsion: 2 × Type M 521 diesel engines (16,184 PS; 11,903 kW)
- Speed: 28 kn (52 km/h)
- Range: 2,400 nmi (4,400 km) at 14 kn (26 km/h)
- Complement: 32 (includes 6 officers)
- Sensors & processing systems: MR-352 (NATO: Cross Dome) E/F band air and surface search radar; Pechora I-band navigation radar; MR-123 (NATO: Bass Tilt) H/I-band fire-control radar; Rat Tail variable depth sonar
- Electronic warfare & decoys: 2 × PK 16 chaff launchers
- Armament: 1 × quad Strela-2M (SA-N-5) SAM; 1 × 76 mm AK-176 gun; 1 × 30 mm AK-630 gun; 4 × 533 mm torpedo tubes, SET-65E anti-submarine torpedoes; 2 × RBU-1200 five-tubed anti-submarine rocket launcher

The Abhay-class corvettes of the Indian Navy were the customised variants of the Soviet Pauk-class corvettes. The class was primarily intended for coastal patrol and anti-submarine warfare. The last ship of the class is expected to be decommissioned by 2025. The class is being replaced by Arnala and Mahe subclasses of Anti-Submarine Warfare Shallow Water Craft (ASW SWC). The ships formed the 23 Patrol Vessel Squadron of the Indian Navy.

== Description ==
Abhay class is modified from Pauk II class under Project 1241 PE. The ships were built at Volodarski shipyard in the former Soviet Union. Abhay class vessels are longer, have larger torpedo tubes and improved electronics when compared to the Pauk I class vessels. The ships in the class were named after former Abhay-class seaward defence boats.

Abhay class is to be upgraded with Abhay integrated sonar system developed by Naval Physical and Oceanographic Laboratory.

== Service history ==
INS Agray was damaged in 2004 when an anti-submarine rocket fired from the onboard RBU-1200 launcher misfired and exploded on the side of the ship. Following the accident, the vessel was converted into a patrol vessel and a trials ship for electronic warfare systems.

The Ministry of Defence cleared acquisition of 16 shallow water anti-submarine vessels to replace the Abhay class of vessels. They would form the Arnala and Mahe subclasses of the Anti Submarine Warfare Shallow Water Craft.

INS Ajay was decommissioned on 19 September 2022 after 32 years of service in the Indian Navy.

INS Abhay, as per earlier confirmation, was decommissioned on 6 October 2025 during sunset along with INFAC T-82, a Super Dvora Mk II-class patrol boat. This marked the end of active service of the Abhay class of ships with the Indian Navy. Vice Admiral Krishna Swaminathan, the Flag Officer Commanding-in-Chief Western Naval Command (FOCINC WNC), was the chief guest of the ceremony, hosted at the Naval Dockyard (Mumbai), while attendees included the commissioning crew of the vessels, former Commanding Officers and senior dignitaries. The ships were under the command of Commander Abhay Kumar Singh and Lieutenant Commander Adishesh Mishra, respectively.

== Ships of the class ==
Name	Pennant	Builder	Commissioned	Decommissioned	Status
Abhay	P33	Volodarski	10 March 1989	6 October 2025	Decommissioned
Ajay	P34	Volodarski	24 January 1990	19 September 2022	Decommissioned
Akshay	P35	Volodarski	10 December 1990	3 June 2022	Decommissioned
Agray	P36	Volodarski	30 January 1991	27 January 2017	Decommissioned

== See also ==
- List of historical ships of the Indian Navy
