= Protector USV =

Israeli unmanned surface vehicle

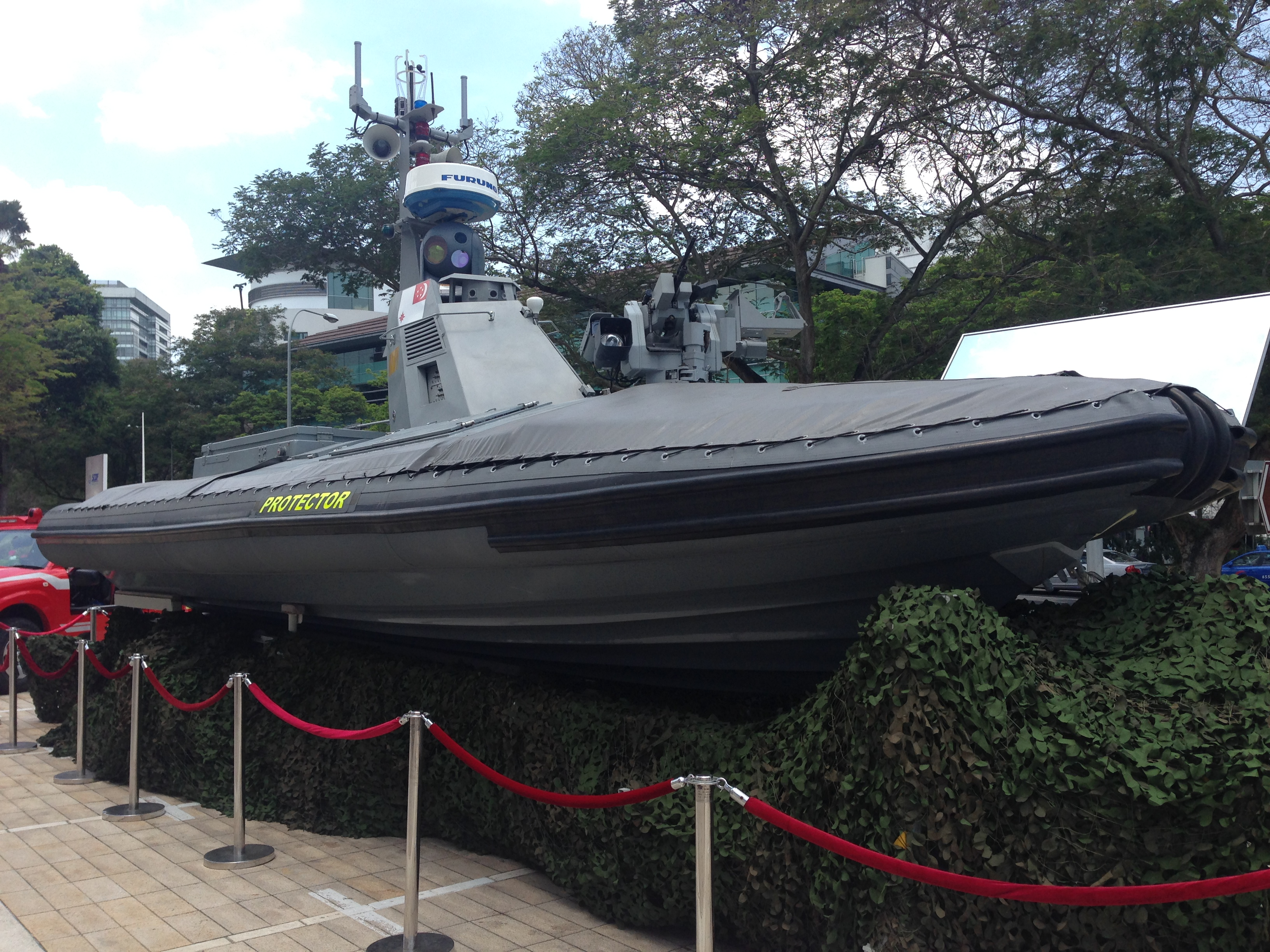
A Protector USV on display at the National Museum of Singapore in February 2014

The Protector unmanned surface vehicle (USV) was developed by the Israeli Rafael Advanced Defense Systems in response to emerging terrorist threats against maritime assets such as the USS Cole bombing, and is the first operational combat USV in service. It is fitted with a Mini Typhoon Weapon Station. In 2005, it was deployed by the Singapore Navy to support coalition forces in the Persian Gulf, and was later deployed for anti-piracy duties in the Gulf of Aden. In 2012, Rafael announced that they were building a larger (11 metre) version of the Protector, that would have a greater range, and be equipped with a wider range of weaponry.

== Features ==
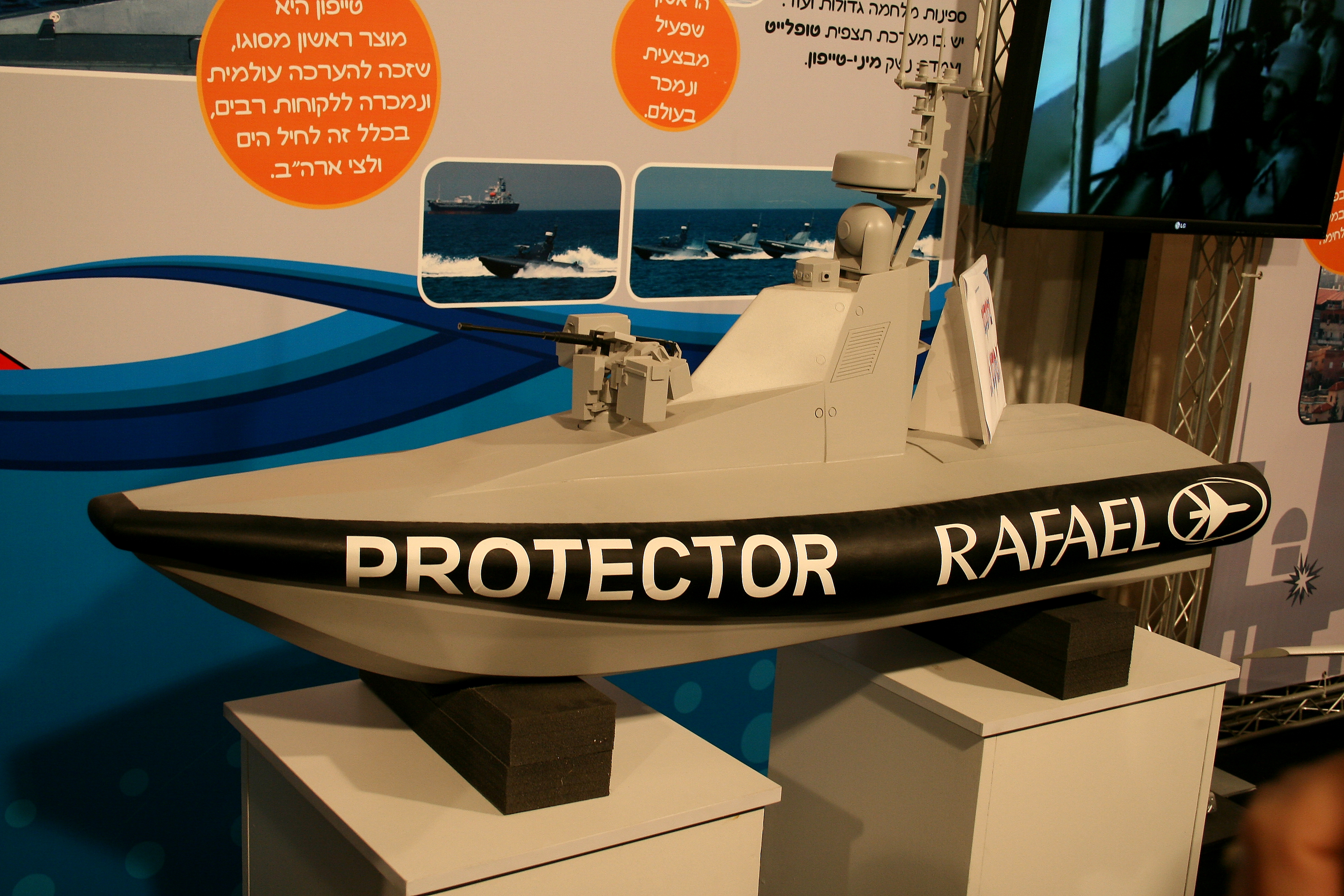
1:6 scale model of Protector USV

Based on a 9-metre (30-foot) rigid-hulled inflatable boat, the Protector is stealthy, fast and highly maneuverable. The vessel's low profile upper structure is sealed and aerodynamic, and its modular platform design allows it to be reconfigured to meet changing mission requirements, such as force protection, anti-terror, surveillance and reconnaissance, mine and electronic warfare. The hull is a deep V-shaped planing hull, with the inflatable section providing stability and endurance. A single diesel engine drives water jets, allowing speeds of 50 knots (92.6 km/h; 57.5 mph).

The Protector offers enhanced surveillance, identification and interception capabilities. It is equipped with a Mini-Typhoon stabilized weapon system, a TOPLITE electro-optic surveillance and targeting system with day and night targeting capabilities through the use of forward looking infrared, charge-coupled devices and laser rangefinders, as well as a public address system.

The Protector is remotely controlled and can be operated with guidance from a commander and operator located ashore or aboard a manned vessel. This allows it to provide the first line of defense, inspecting vessels of interest while personnel and capital assets are held at a safe distance.

== Deployment ==
The Protector was deployed by the Republic of Singapore Navy together with its Endurance class landing platform dock ships to the North Persian Gulf for peacekeeping operations in 2005, where it performed surveillance and reconnaissance, as well as force protection duties for more than eight hours at a time.

In 2006, BAE Systems, Lockheed Martin and Rafael demonstrated the Protector's force protection capabilities to the United States Navy, United States Coast Guard and other maritime security agencies at the United States Special Operations Command trade show in Tampa Bay, Florida, as part of the littoral combat ship and Integrated Deepwater System Program programs.

== General specifications ==
- Displacement: 4 tonnes
- Length: 9 metres (29 ft 6.3 in)
- Beam: 3.5m
- Draft: 0.46m
- Engine: Diesel
- Propulsion: Water jet
- Speed: 50 knots (92.6 km/h; 57.5 mph)
- Range: 400 nm (740 km) @ 30 Knots (56 km/h)
- Cost per unit: $3,175,000
- Navigation: Radar, GPS and INS
- Sensors: TOPLITE electro-optic surveillance and targeting system (incorporating FLIR, Digital CCD surveillance camera and laser rangefinders)
- Armament: Mini-Typhoon stabilized weapon system

== Operators ==
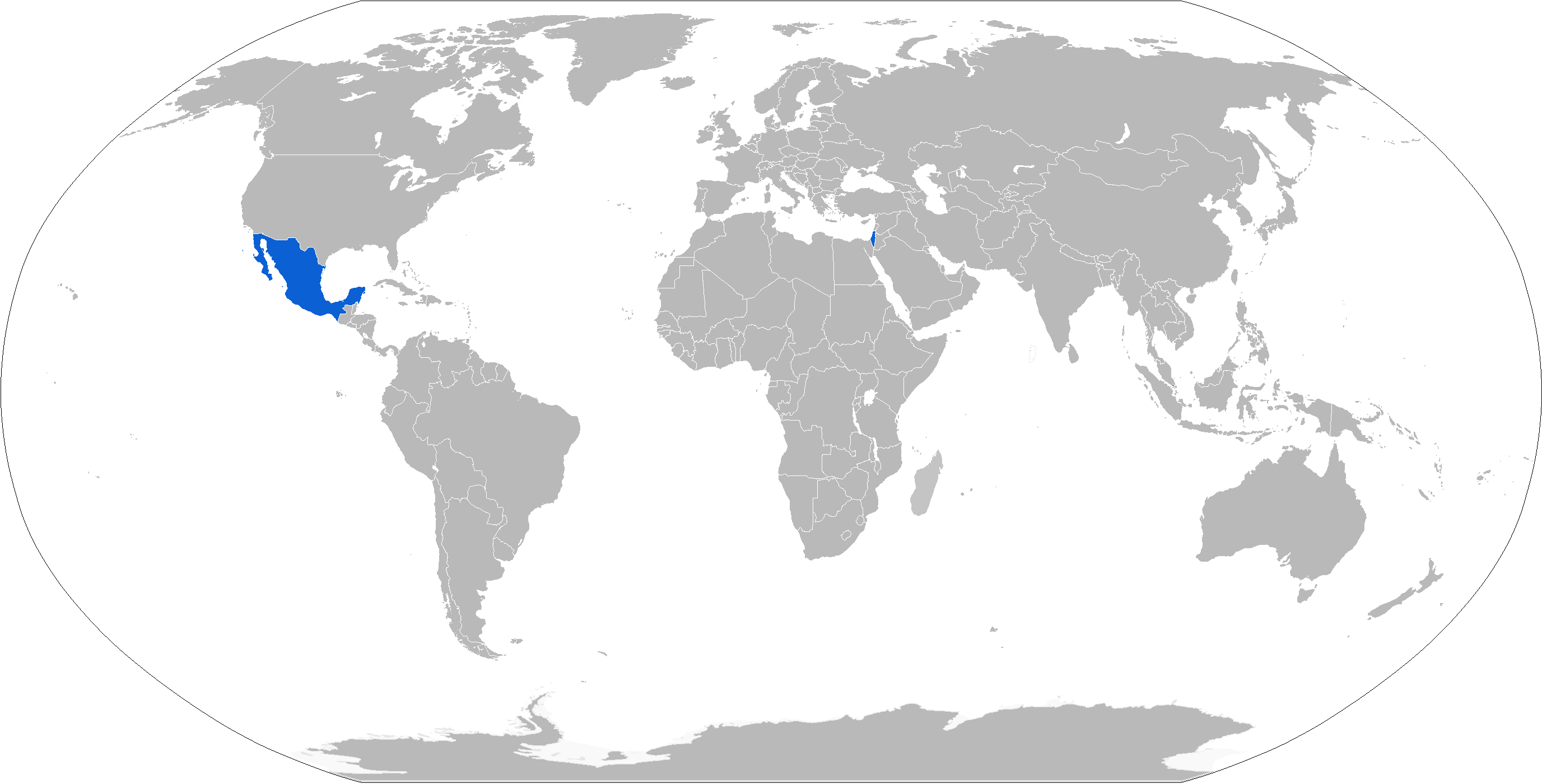
Map with Protector operators in blue

=== Current operators ===
- Israel: Israeli Navy
- Singapore: Republic of Singapore Navy
- Mexico: Mexican Navy
