= Super Dvora Mk III-class patrol boat =

Israeli military fast patrol boat

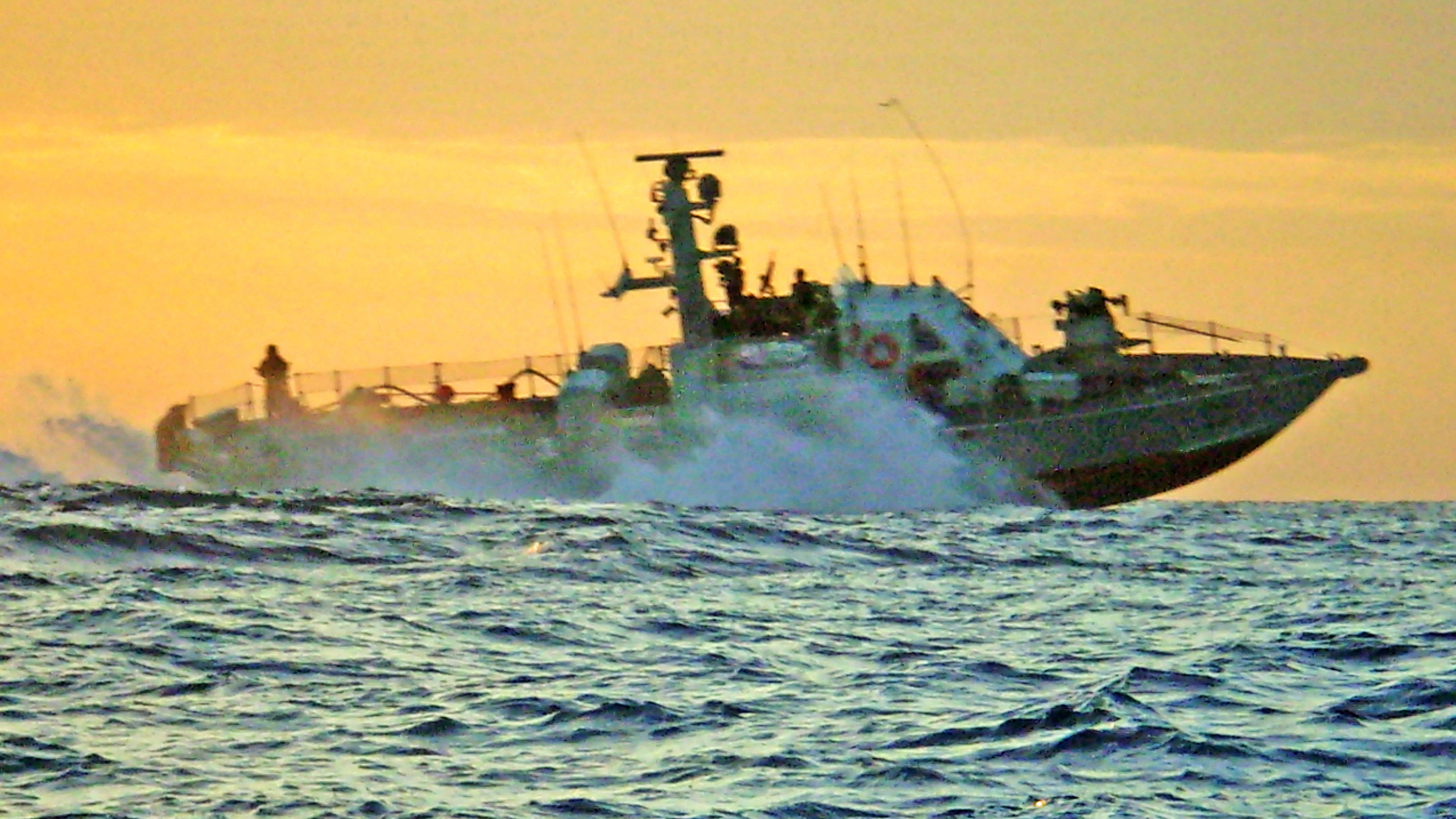

Class overview
- Name: Super Dvora Mark III class
- Builders: IAI-Ramta
- Operators: See Operators
- Preceded by: Super Dvora Mk II class
- Subclasses: Super Dvora Multi-Role, Super Dvora Mk IIIi
- In commission: 2004
- Planned: 19
- Completed: 19
- Active: 19

General characteristics
- Type: Fast patrol boat
- Displacement: Mk III: 72 tons; Multi-Role: 85 tons; Mk IIIi: 50 tons
- Length: Mk III: 27.4 metres (90 ft); Multi-Role: 29 metres (95 ft); Mk IIIi: 20 metres (66 ft)
- Beam: Mk III/IIIi: 5.67 metres (18.6 ft); Multi-Role: 6.3 metres (21 ft)
- Draught: 1.1 metres (3.6 ft)
- Propulsion: 2x Detroit Diesel MTU 12V-4000 M90 (4,175 hp (3,113 kW) total) and 2x Arneson Surface Drive-16 articulating propulsion systems
- Speed: 45 knots (83 km/h)-50 knots (93 km/h)
- Range: Multi-Role: 1,500 nautical miles (2,780 km) at 10 knots (19 km/h); Mk III: 700 nautical miles (1,300 km) at 14 knots (26 km/h); Mk IIIi: 300 nautical miles (560 km) at 30 knots (56 km/h)
- Crew: 9-12
- Armament: 4 × AGM-114 Hellfire (Surface-to-surface type) missiles, SPIKE NLOS missiles; 1 × Typhoon 20-30 mm stabilized cannon; 1 × Oerlikon 20 mm cannon; 2 × 12.7 mm machine guns; Automatic grenade launchers

The Super Dvora Mark III-class patrol boat is the latest generation of the Dvora family of fast patrol boats or fast attack craft (FPB/FAC). Manufactured by IAI Ramta in 2004 these vessels are capable of travelling up to 50 knots (93 km/h; 58 mph) in littoral waters thanks to its state of the art thrust vectoring control Articulated Surface Drives (ASD) while holding various armaments, from automatic grenade launchers, AGM-114 Hellfire missiles, SPIKE NLOS missiles, and 30 mm cannons in its armory.

== Design and construction ==
=== Performance ===
The Super Dvora Mk III craft features interception of sea target at high-speeds approaching 50 knots; long-range missions thanks to its sea replenishment ability ahead of a typical four-day endurance; high maneuverability in both open ocean and littoral environment; steady sea keeping in a range of sea states and very callous weather; and the ability to incorporate advanced, stabilized, accurate marine arsenal and sensors. Taken as a whole, vessel displacement varies from 72 to 58 tons depending on the operation package.

These vessels are fast and agile, and designed to reach and maintain high operating tempos. Its hull geometry provides constant sea keeping at all speeds, and a dry deck throughout high-speed runs and tracking down.

=== Propulsion system ===
The propulsion system consists of two Detroit Diesel MTU 12V-4000 (4,175 horsepower (3,113 kW) total) engines driving two articulated surface drives, which were initially designed for competitive speedboats. Arneson Surface Drive-16 articulating propulsion systems drives provide the vessel with thrust vectoring control. Beside those systems, Mk IIIs are also equipped with ZF4650 reduction gears.

Their thrust-vectoring propulsion system allows Super Dvora Mk III to function in shallow waters at draughts of 1.2 metres (3.9 ft) facilitating special operations forces delivery on enemy shores and catastrophe relief missions.

=== Armaments ===
The Super Dvora Mk III design is robust to allow for the installation of Typhoon 20-30 mm stabilized cannon, heavy machine guns, AGM-114 Hellfire (Surface-to-surface type) missiles, SPIKE NLOS missiles, all of which can be slaved to state-of the art mast-mounted, day/night, long range electro-optic systems including Elbit/El-Op sensors and targeting systems.

== Developments ==
IAI-Ramta is currently working on a number of new configuration upgrade packages for the Super Dvora platform as Strike and Littoral Warrior, which consists of a variety of highly advanced precision weapon systems.

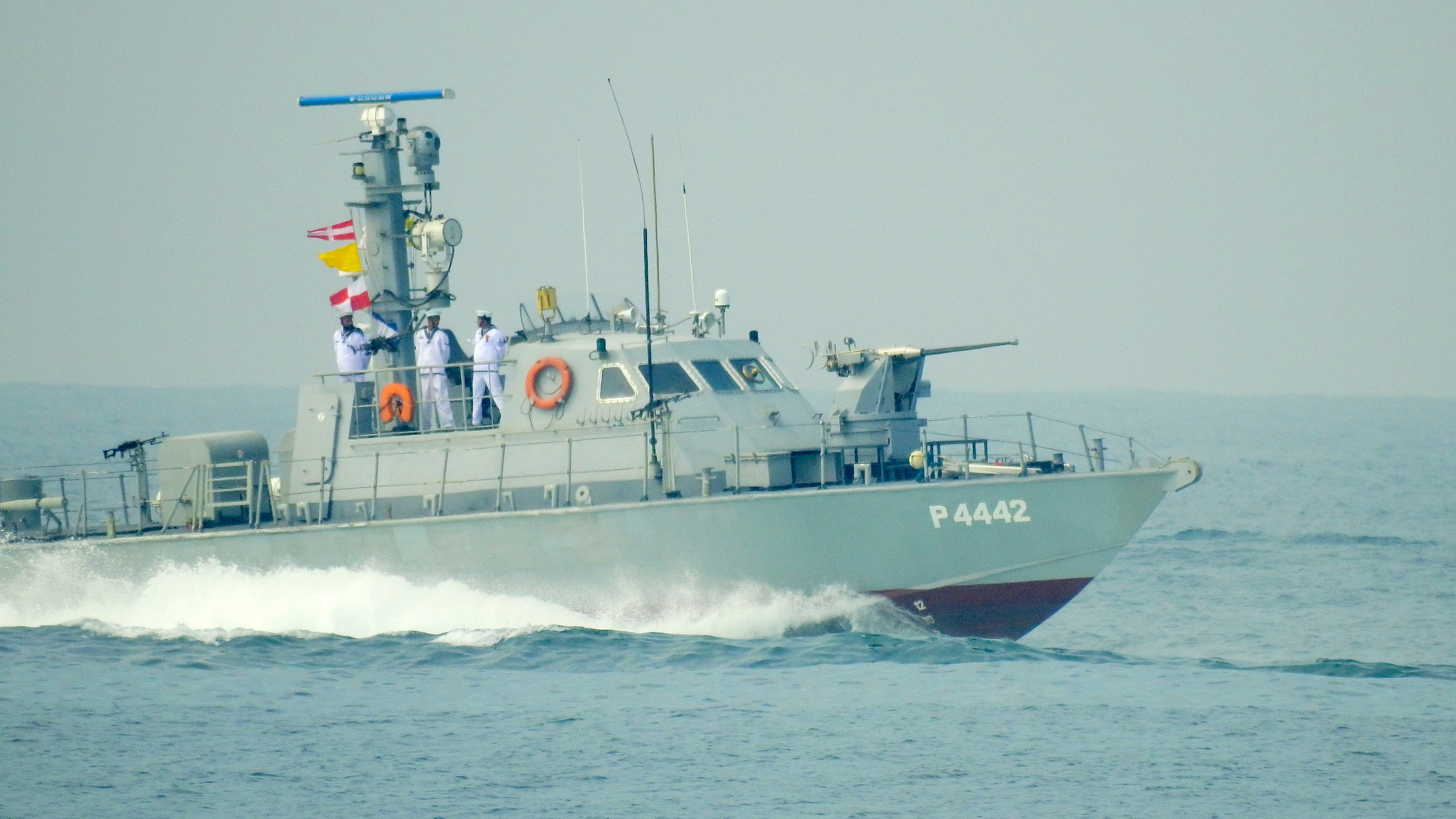
Sri Lanka Navy Super Dvora MK III

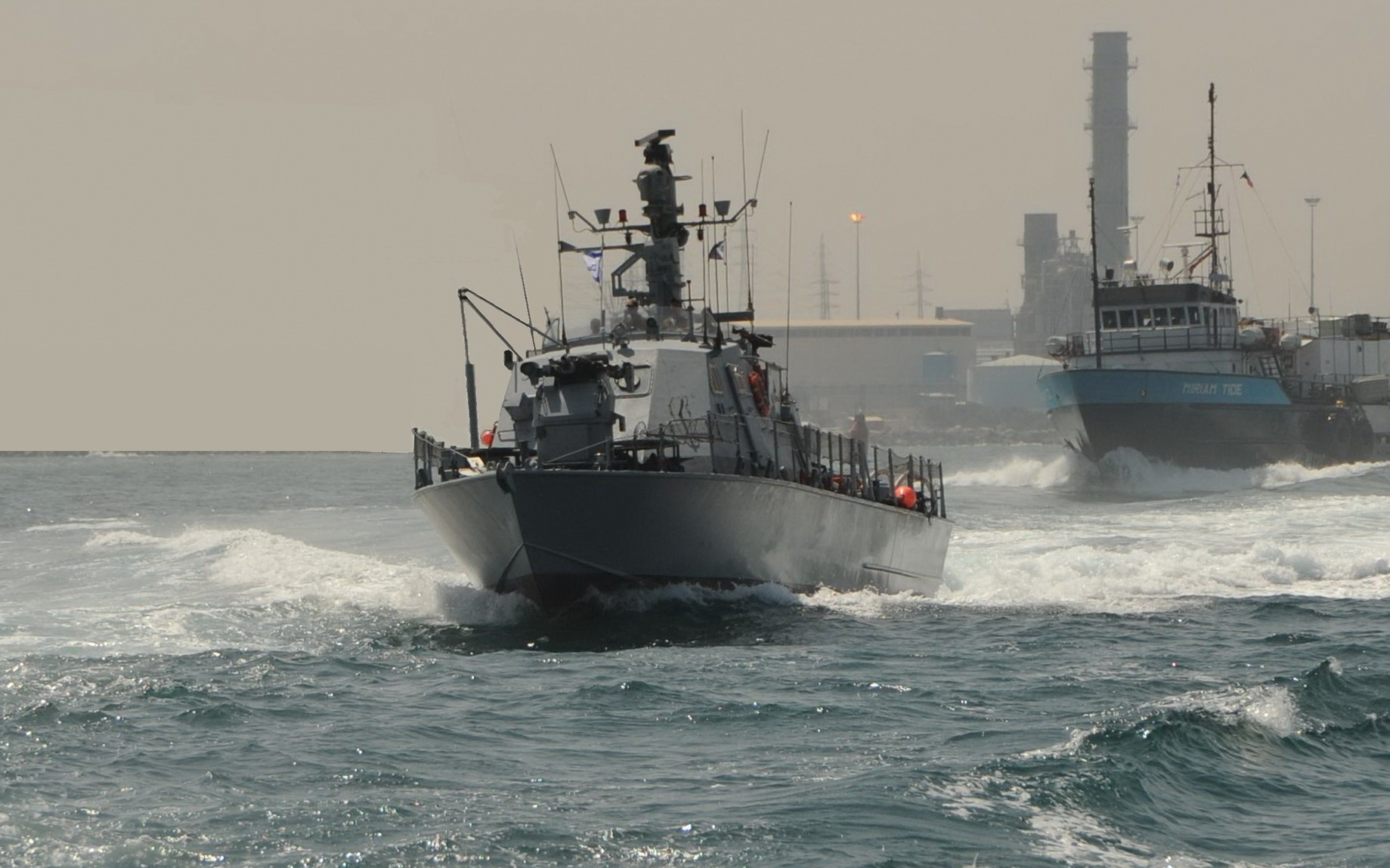
Israel Navy Super Dvora Mk III-class patrol boat

== Operators ==
- Angola: Confirmed to be unnamed country in 2015.
- Israel: Active with Israeli Navy. 13 Dvora Mk IIIs in service.
- Myanmar: 6 Dvora Mk IIIs ordered. The sale is controversial due to its sales while the Rohingya crisis is still going on.
- Sri Lanka: 6 active with Sri Lankan navy.

Preceded by Super Dvora Mk II	Dvora series	Succeeded by latest model
