= INS Akshay (1990) =

History

India
- Name: INS Akshay
- Commissioned: 10 December 1990
- Decommissioned: 3 June 2022
- Status: Decommissioned

General characteristics
- Class & type: Abhay class corvette
- Displacement: 485 tons full load
- Length: 56.0 m (183.7 ft)
- Beam: 10.2 m (33 ft)
- Draft: 3.3 m (11 ft)
- Propulsion: 2 diesel motors with 16,184 hp and 2 shafts (Another report says 4 engines)
- Speed: 28 knots (52 km/h), (32 knots according to Jane's)
- Range: 2,400 mi (3,900 km) at 14 knots (26 km/h)
- Complement: 97 (incl. 7 officers), (Jane's lists 32, with 6 officers)
- Sensors & processing systems: 1 × MR 352 Pozitiv-E search radar; 1 × Pechora navigation radar; 1 × Rat Tail VDS sonar
- Armament: 1 × quad Strela-2M (SA-N-5) SAM; 1 × AK-76/60 76mm gun; 4 × 533mm torpedo tubes, SET-65E anti-submarine torpedoes; 2 × RBU 1200 five-tubed

INS Akshay (P35) is an Abhay class corvette, was in service with the Indian Navy from 10 December 1990 and decommissioned on 3 June 2022.
