= INS Ajay (1990) =

History

India
- Name: INS Ajay
- Commissioned: 24 January 1990
- Decommissioned: 19 September 2022
- Status: Decommissioned

General characteristics
- Class & type: Abhay-class corvette
- Displacement: 485 tons full load
- Length: 56.0 m (183 ft 9 in)
- Beam: 10.2 m (33 ft 6 in)
- Draft: 3.3 m (10 ft 10 in)
- Propulsion: 2 diesel motors with 16,184 hp (12,068 kW) and 2 shafts (Another report says 4 engines)
- Speed: 28 knots (52 km/h; 32 mph), (32 knots (59 km/h; 37 mph) according to Jane's)
- Range: 2,400 mi (3,900 km) at 14 knots (26 km/h; 16 mph)
- Complement: 97 (incl. 7 officers), (Jane's lists 32, with 6 officers)
- Sensors & processing systems: 1 × MR 352 Pozitiv-E search radar; 1 × Pechora navigation radar; 1 × Rat Tail VDS sonar
- Armament: 1 × quad Strela-2M (SA-N-5) SAM; 1 × AK-76/60 76 mm gun; 4 × 533 mm torpedo tubes, SET-65E anti-submarine torpedoes; 2 × RBU 1200 five-tubed

INS Ajay (P34) was an Abhay-class corvette, in service with the Indian Navy. She inherited her name from INS Ajay, the first warship built in independent India, which served in the Navy from 1960–1974.

INS Ajay was commissioned on 24 January 1990 at Poti, Soviet Union (now in Georgia) as part of the 23rd Patrol Vessel Squadron under the operational control of flag officer commanding Maharashtra Naval Area. Vice Admiral A.G. Thapliyal served as the ship's first commanding officer. The ship participated in several naval operations, including Operation Talwar during the Kargil War and Operation Parakram in 2001.

== Decommissioning ==
INS Ajay was decommissioned on 19 September 2022 at a ceremony held at the Naval Dockyard in Mumbai, after over 32 years in active service. Vice Admiral Ajendra Bahadur Singh, flag officer commanding-in-chief, Western Naval Command was the chief guest for the function, Vice Admiral Thapliyal (Retd) was the guest of honour, and over 400 personnel, including flag officers, senior officers from the Indian Army, Indian Air Force and Indian Coast Guard, and officers and men of the commissioning crew, crew of previous commissions as well as the ship's present crew and families attended the decommissioning.
