= Ukrainian patrol ship Hryhoriy Kuropyatnykov =

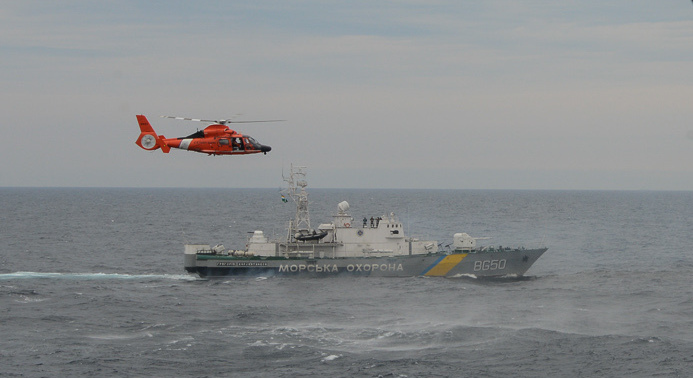
- Hryhoriy Kuropyatnykov alongside an MH-65 Dolphin helicopter from USCGC Hamilton in the Black Sea, 2021

History

→ Soviet Union → Ukraine
- Name: Hryhoriy Kuropyatnykov
- Namesake: Grigory Kuropyatnikov
- Builder: Yaroslavl Shipyard, Yaroslavl
- Laid down: 20 October 1982
- Launched: 18 January 1984
- Commissioned: 30 September 1984
- Home port: Balaclava (1984-2014), Odessa (2014-2022)
- Identification: BG-50
- Fate: Unknown, presumed sunk on 7-8 May 2022 by Russian aircraft near Odessa

General characteristics
- Class & type: Pauk-class corvette
- Displacement: 475 tons

The Ukrainian patrol ship Hryhoriy Kuropyatnykov was a Pauk-class corvette in service as the flagship of the Ukrainian Sea Guard.

== Design and construction ==
The Project 1241.2 "Molniya-2" (Pauk-class corvette) were intended for use with the Soviet Border Troops in peacetime, and easily converted to military use for anti submarine duties for the Soviet Navy in wartime.

The ship was laid down on 20 October 1982 at the Yaroslavl Shipyard and launched on 18 January 1984. The ship was named after the Hero of the Soviet Union and NKVD Border Troops Officer Grigory Kuropyatnikov.

== Operational history ==
=== Soviet Union ===
Grigory Kuropyatnikov entered service with the Soviet Border Troops on 30 September 1984, and was based in Balaklava, Crimea. The ship first went to sea on 4 November 1984, commanded by Captain Pavel Appolonovich Kozhevnikov. The ship engaged in border patrol, primarily conducting protection duties for the Soviet exclusive economic zone and fisheries monitoring off the coast of Crimea.

=== Ukraine ===
On 21 January 1992, the ships crew took the oath of allegiance to Ukraine.

On 20 March 1996, Grigory Kuropyatnikov detained the Turkish poaching vessel Baba Yusuf. Later in the year, alongside her sister ship Poltava, the vessel made a visit to Poti, Georgia.

On 15 January 1998, the Pauk-class corvettes Grigory Kuropyatnikov and Grygoriy Gnatenko intercepted the Turkish poaching schooner Taren Kapten. The schooner attempted to ram Grigory Kuropyatnikov but capsized and sunk as a result.

In 2000, the ship was reclassified with the new hull number BG-50. On 21 March 2000 Hryhoriy Kuropyatnykov engaged several Turkish poaching vessels in the Black Sea near Snake Island. During the engagement, more than 20 shots from the ships AK-176 naval gun were fired, resulting in severe damage to the shooner Emir Ahmed, resulting in its sinking. The crew were detained aboard the ship. Another schooner was reportedly also engaged. The conflict marks the first instance of a naval engagement by the newly independent Ukraine.

Following the Russian annexation of Crimea, Hryhoriy Kuropyatnykov along with several other Ukrainian Sea Guard vessels were relocated to Odessa.

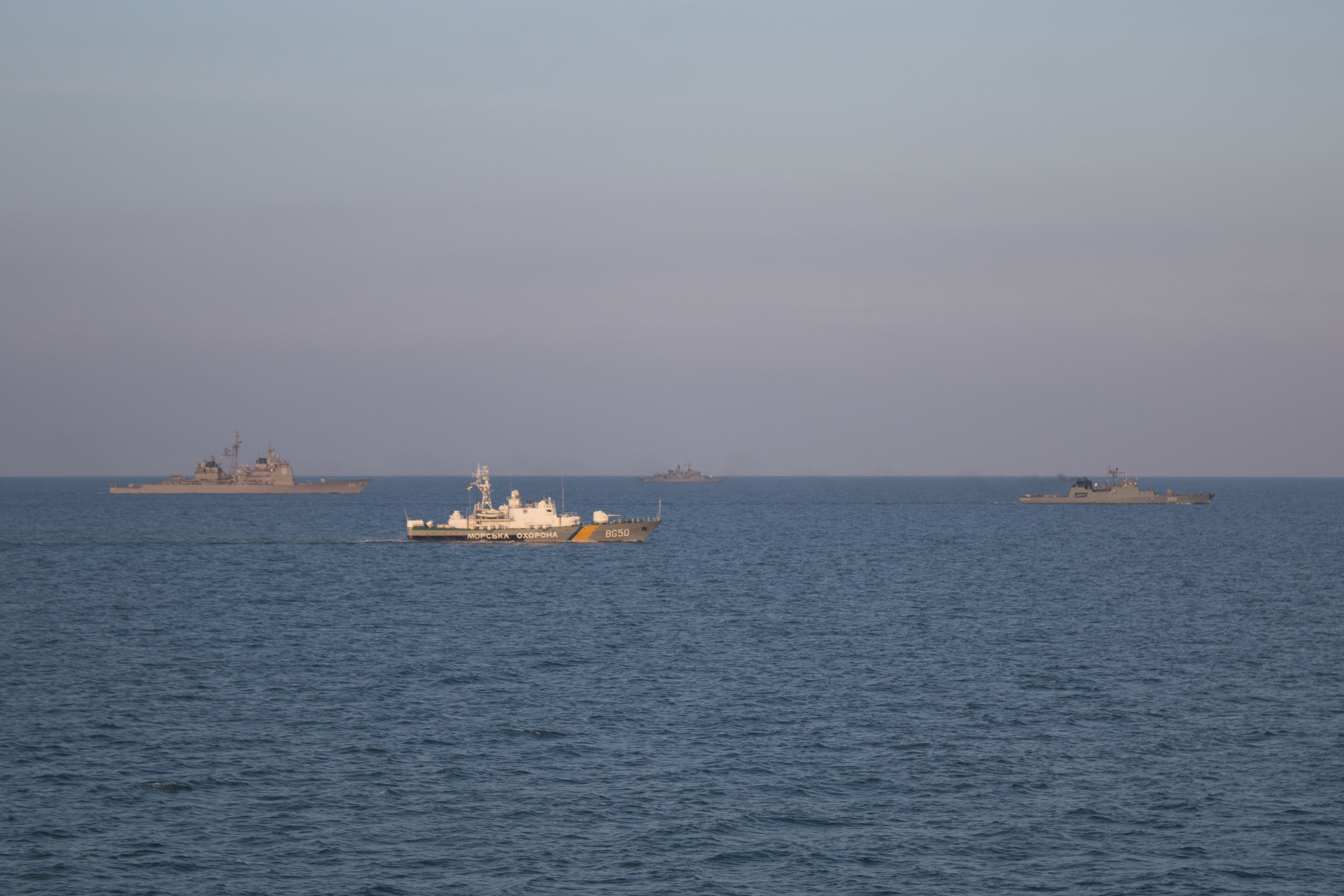
Hryhoriy Kuropyatnykov alongside USS Hue City, TCG Turgutreis and ROS Macellariu.

In 2017, Hryhoriy Kuropyatnykov took part in joint exercises with the United States Navy destroyer USS Carney off the coast of Odessa. The vessel would also join Sea Breeze 2017 alongside the cruiser USS Hue City, and the frigates TCG Turgutreis and ROS Macellariu.

In 2019 Hryhoriy Kuropyatnykov underwent dock repairs at the Mykolaiv Shipyard.

In May 2021 Hryhoriy Kuropyatnykov alongside the Ukrainian Navy patrol vessel Starobilsk, alongside the US Coast Guard cutter USCGS Hamilton took part in joint exercises in the Black Sea. The exercises were observed by a Rubin-class patrol boat of the Russian Coast Guard.

On 26 February 2022, the ship came under attack from a Russian unmanned aerial vehicle, with the drone shot down while the ship was on patrol near Chernomorsk. Later, Russian sources indicated that the ship was sunk by Sukhoi Su-30 aircraft of the Russian Aerospace Forces on the night of 7-8 May 2022 in the vicinity of the roadstead of Odessa.

== See also ==
- Ukrainian Sea Guard
