= INS Abhay (1989) =

Anti-submarine corvette

History
- Name: INS Abhay
- Commissioned: 10 March 1989
- Decommissioned: 6 October 2025
- Status: Decommissioned

General characteristics
- Class & type: Abhay class corvette
- Displacement: 485 tons full load
- Length: 56.0 m (183.7 ft)
- Beam: 10.2 m (33 ft)
- Draft: 3.3 m (11 ft)
- Propulsion: 2 diesel motors with 16,184 hp and 2 shafts (Another report says 4 engines)
- Speed: 28 knots (52 km/h), (32 knots according to Jane's)
- Range: 2,400 mi (3,900 km) at 14 knots (26 km/h)
- Complement: 97 (incl. 7 officers), (Jane's lists 32, with 6 officers)
- Sensors & processing systems: 1 × MR 352 Pozitiv-E search radar; 1 × Pechora navigation radar; 1 × Rat Tail VDS sonar
- Armament: 1 × quad Strela-2M (SA-N-5) SAM; 1 × AK-176 76mm gun; 4 × 533mm torpedo tubes, SET-65E anti-submarine torpedoes; 2 × RBU-1200 five-tubed Anti-submarine warfare rocket launchers

INS Abhay (P33) ("Fearless") was the lead ship of her class of anti-submarine warfare corvettes, which were in service with the Indian Navy.

Abhay is Sanskrit for fearless. The ship was commissioned on 10 March 1989 at Poti, Georgia in the erstwhile USSR.

INS Abhay, as per earlier confirmation, was decommissioned on 6 October 2025 during sunset along with INFAC T-82, a Super Dvora Mk II-class patrol boat. This marked the end of active service of the Abhay class of ships with the Indian Navy. Vice Admiral Krishna Swaminathan, the Flag Officer Commanding-in-Chief Western Naval Command (FOCINC WNC), was the chief guest of the ceremony, hosted at the Naval Dockyard (Mumbai), while attendees included the commissioning crew of the vessels, former Commanding Officers and senior dignitaries.
