= INS Karwar =

Two ships of the Indian Navy have been named INS Karwar:

- INS Karwar (M92), a Ton-class minesweeper the former HMS Overton acquired in 1956 and decommissioned in 1981
- INS Karwar (M67), a Pondicherry-class minesweeper commissioned in 1986 and decommissioned in 2017
