= M71 =

M71, M-71, or M.71 may refer to:

- Globular Cluster M71 or Messier 71, a globular cluster in the constellation Sagitta
- INS Kozhikode (M71), a minesweeper of the Karwar class
- M71 (Johannesburg), a major metropolitan road route in Johannesburg, South Africa
- M-71 (Michigan highway), a state highway in Michigan
- M/71 mine, an Egyptian mine
- Macchi M.71, an Italian flying boat fighter aircraft of the 1930s
- Miles M.71 Merchantman, a bigger all-metal design of the Miles Aerovan
- PM M71 Floating Bridge, pontoon bridge of the Soviet PMP Floating Bridge design located in the former Yugoslavia
- RK 71 or commercially M71, a Finnish assault rifle
- Shvetsov M-71, soviet air-cooled aircraft engine of World War II era
- Soltam M-71, a 1979 Israeli 155 mm 39 calibre towed howitzer
- Swiss M1971 Helmet, a Swiss steel military helmet
