= INS Cuddalore =

Two ships of the Indian Navy have been named INS Cuddalore:

- INS Cuddalore (M90), a Ton-class minesweeper the former HMS Wennington acquired in 1956 and decommissioned in 1979
- INS Cuddalore (M69), a Pondicherry-class minesweeper commissioned in 1987 and decommissioned in 2018
