= Swiss Militärblachen =

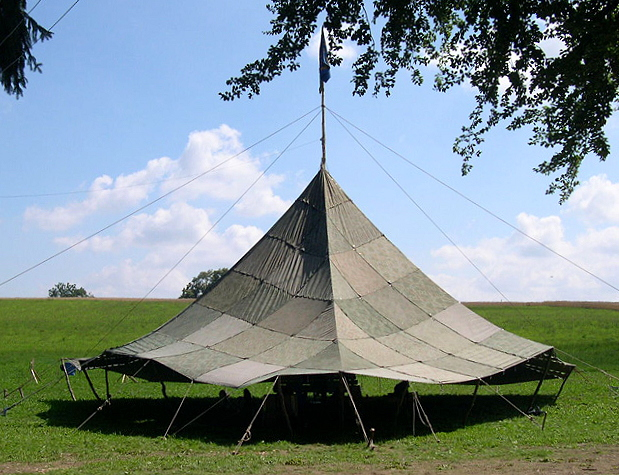
Tent made of 108 Military Tarpaulin made in Scout camp

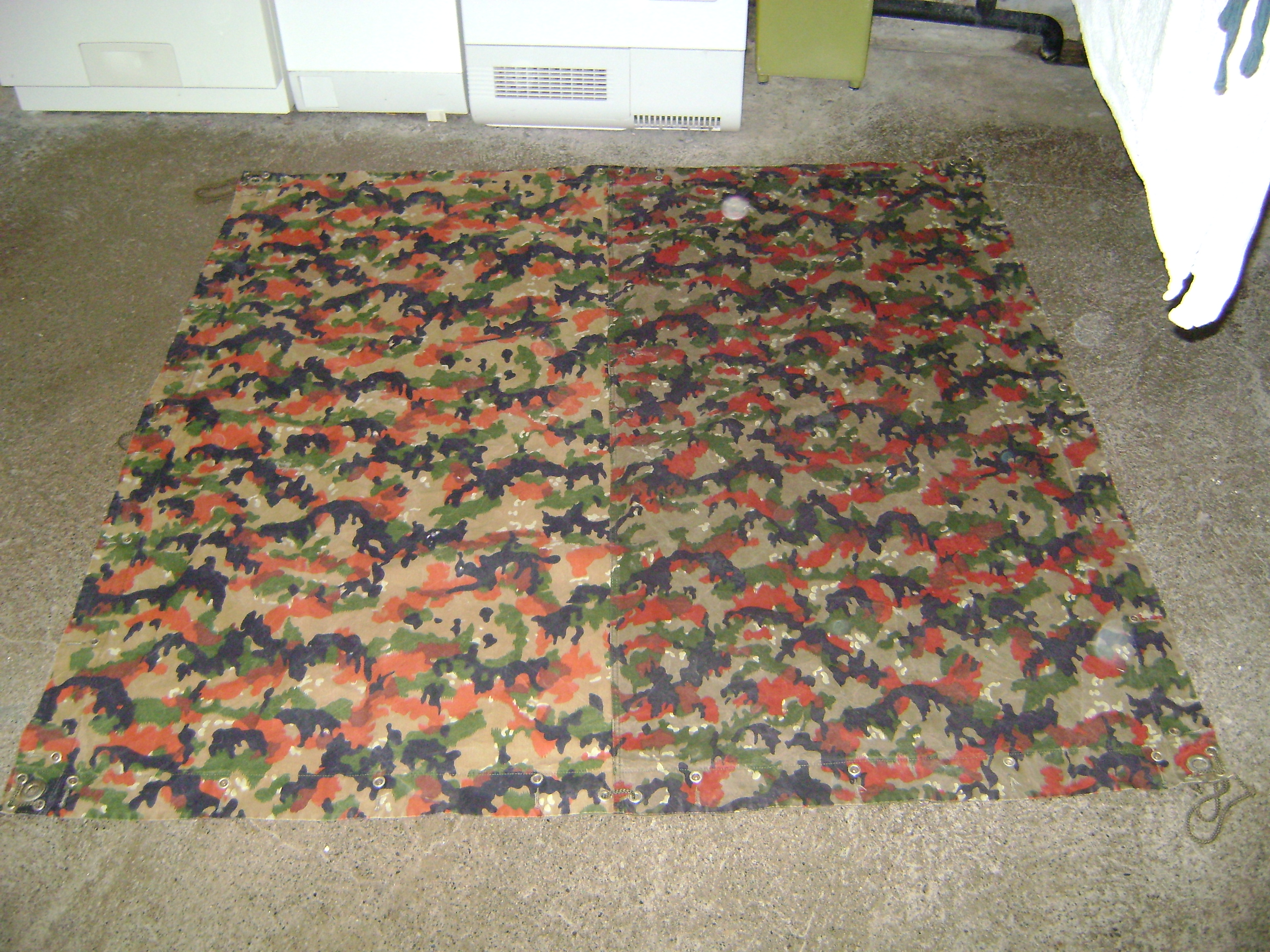
Swiss Military Tarpaulin frontside

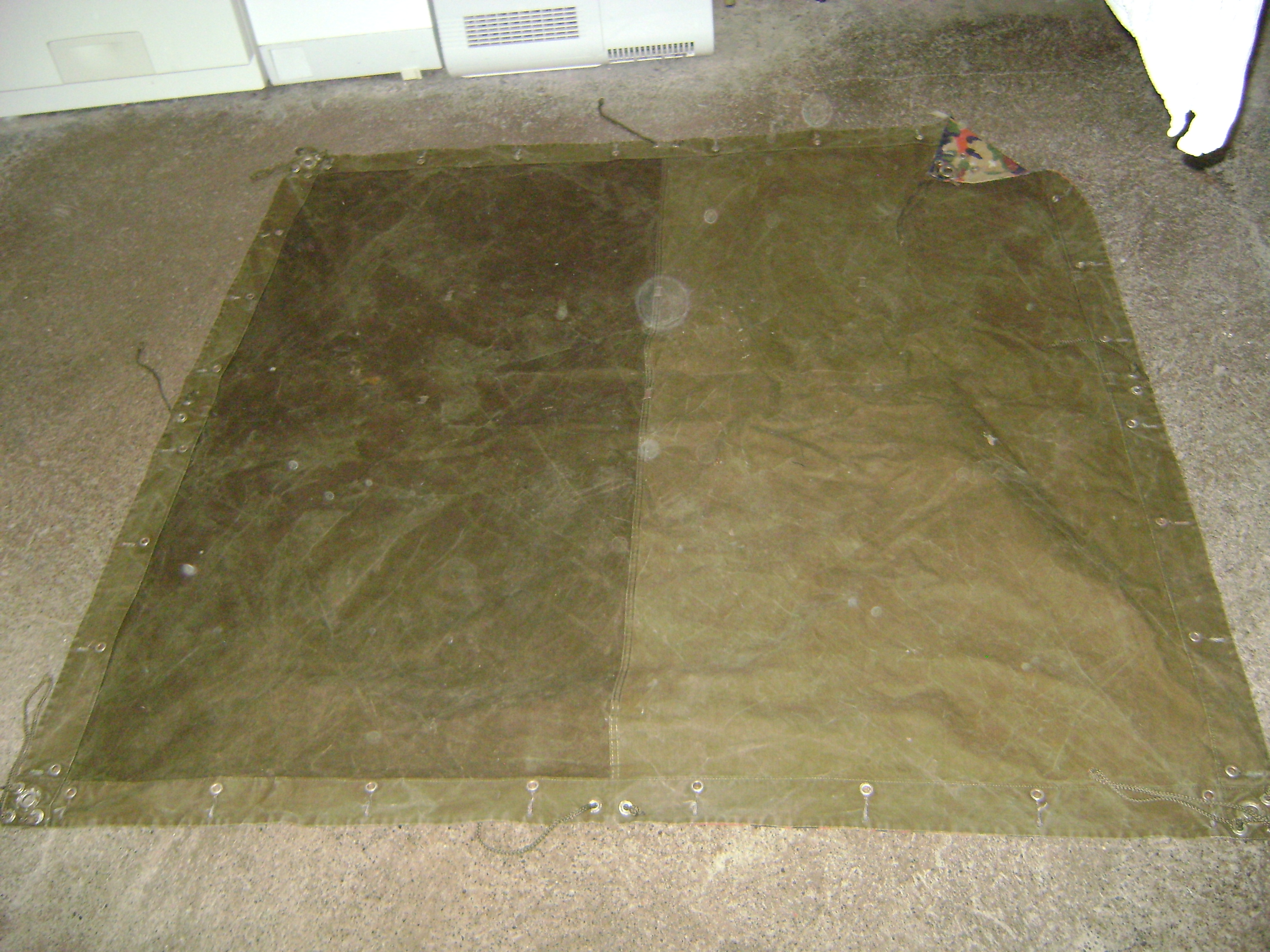
Swiss Military Tarpaulin backside

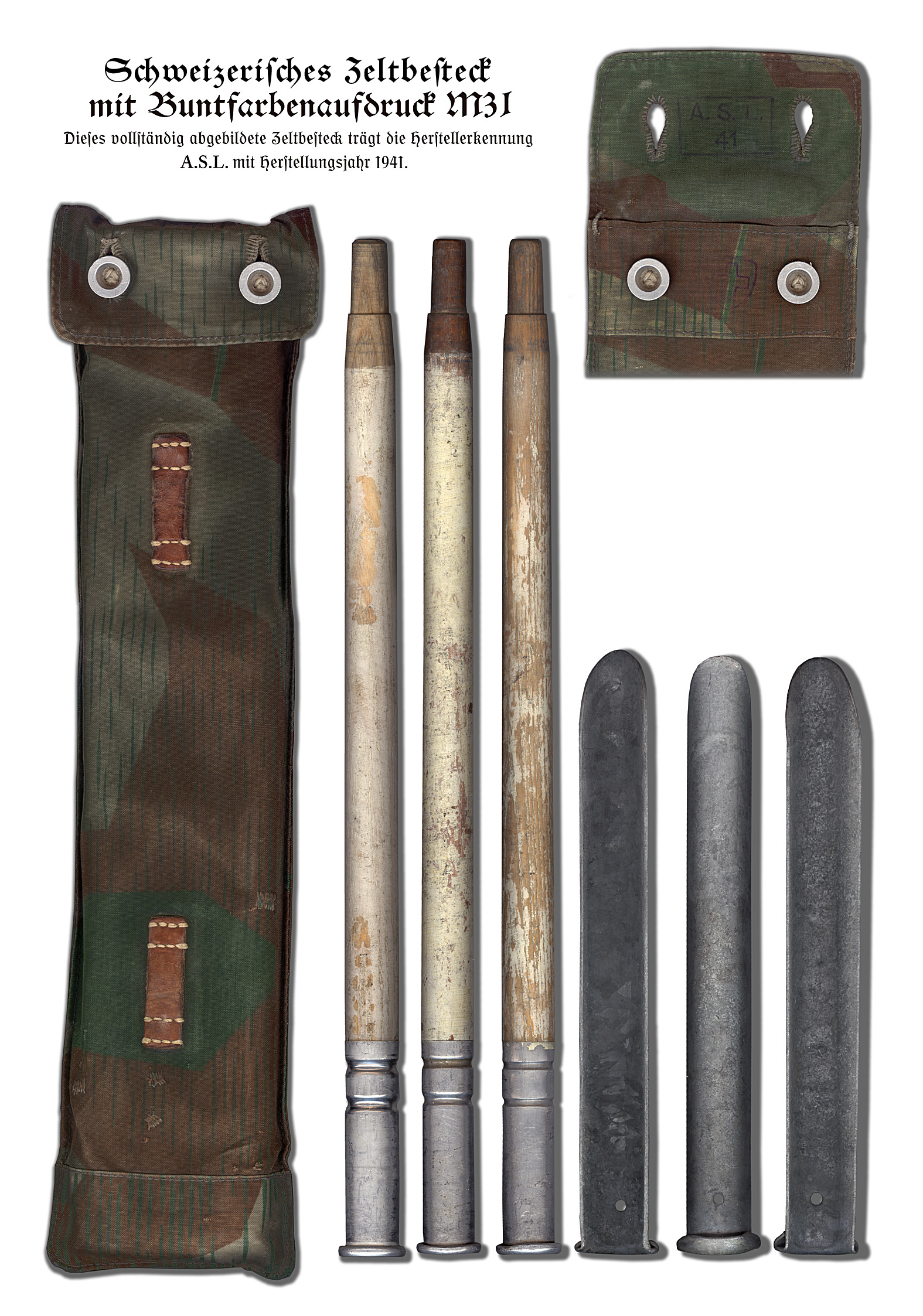
Zelteinheit

Swiss Militärblachen, a kind of Military Shelter-half, are square tarpaulins printed with camouflage. They are used as rain protection, as elements in bivouac and for camouflaging military equipment. They are specially treated and therefore water repellent and highly resistant to abrasion and dirt. "Blache" is Swiss German. The word is not used in any other German-speaking country. In Germany and Austria, shelter-halves are known as "Mehrzweckplane", however, the ones used there are trapezoid-shaped.

The official name is the Swiss army tent 01 and tent 64. The number in each case represents the year of introduction (1901 and 1964). The two models differ in camouflage and button arrangement. They are sewn or riveted to the Militärblachen, and very old models have the buttons on a strong string attached so that a button can be used on both sides - the button can be pulled through the loop to the opposite side.

Older Militärblachen have the TAZ 83 camo pattern on one side, while newer ones have a green camo pattern on both sides, not similar to the TAZ 90 pattern.

The Swiss Militärblache is square and has a side length of 165 centimeters. It consists of chemically modified Cotton and has reinforced seams, giving it very high tensile strength. Along the edges are 32 buttonholes and 64 aluminium buttons installed in double rows, making it possible to connect two sheets. Every Militärblache has a removable 2-meter tent cord in a 60 cm long "neck strap" and four corner and center cords. The corners have strong metal eyelets to hold a tent pole. The dry Militärblache weighs 1.25 kg.

Every tarp has a peg bag ("Zelteinheit"), which includes three aluminum or steel pegs (depending on the version) and either three pegs of wood (each 40.5 cm, composed of 110 cm long) or four long and one short aluminum tent poles.

Damaged Militärblachen were once identified by a corner with a yellow color and referred to as "B-Blache" or "Ausschussblache" (Surplus). Today, all tarps with double print are surplus, since new tarps only have camouflage print on one side.

By skillfully combining several different Tarpaulins, tents can be manufactured in different sizes and shapes. In this use, the surplus is interesting especially for youth organizations (Scouts, CEVI, Jungwacht, blue ring, BESJ and others).

Swiss Militärblachen with the TAZ 83 pattern are still in use in the Swiss Military along with Militärblachen with the green camo pattern.

== See also ==
- Swiss Military TAZ 90
- List of camouflage patterns
