= M1918 helmet (Switzerland) =

Swiss military combat helmet

M1918 Helmet
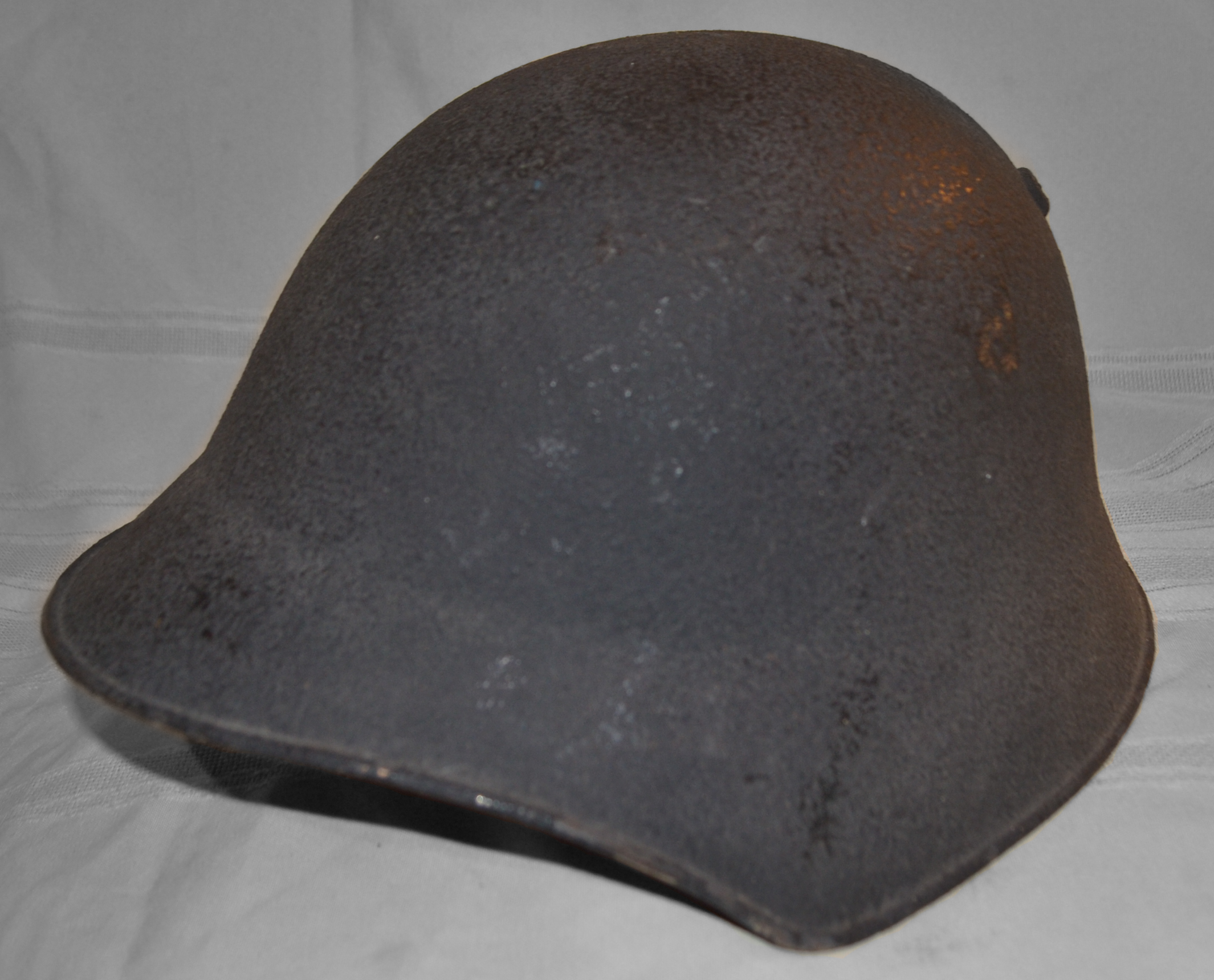
- M1918/1940 Helmet, note the matte textured finish.
- Type: Combat Helmet
- Place of origin: Switzerland

Service history
- In service: 1918 – 1971
- Used by: See Users

Production history
- Designer: Dr. Edward A. Gessler and Paul Boesh
- Designed: 1918
- Produced: 1918 - 1963
- No. produced: 603,000 (All variants)

Specifications
- Weight: 1.15 kg - 1.23 kg

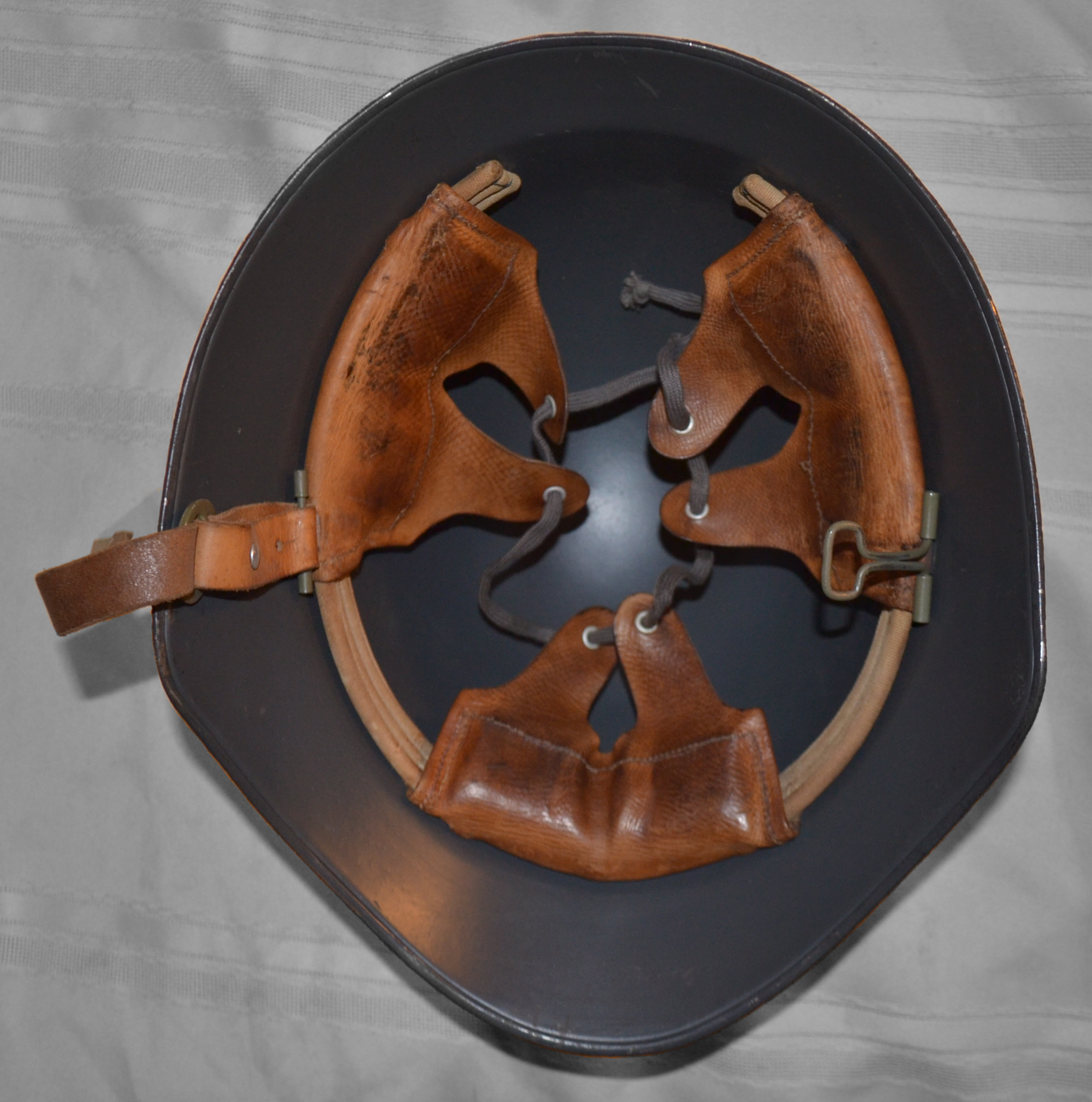
M18/40 Liner, with its three-quarter liner band and three liner pads along with the clamp and hook chin strap.

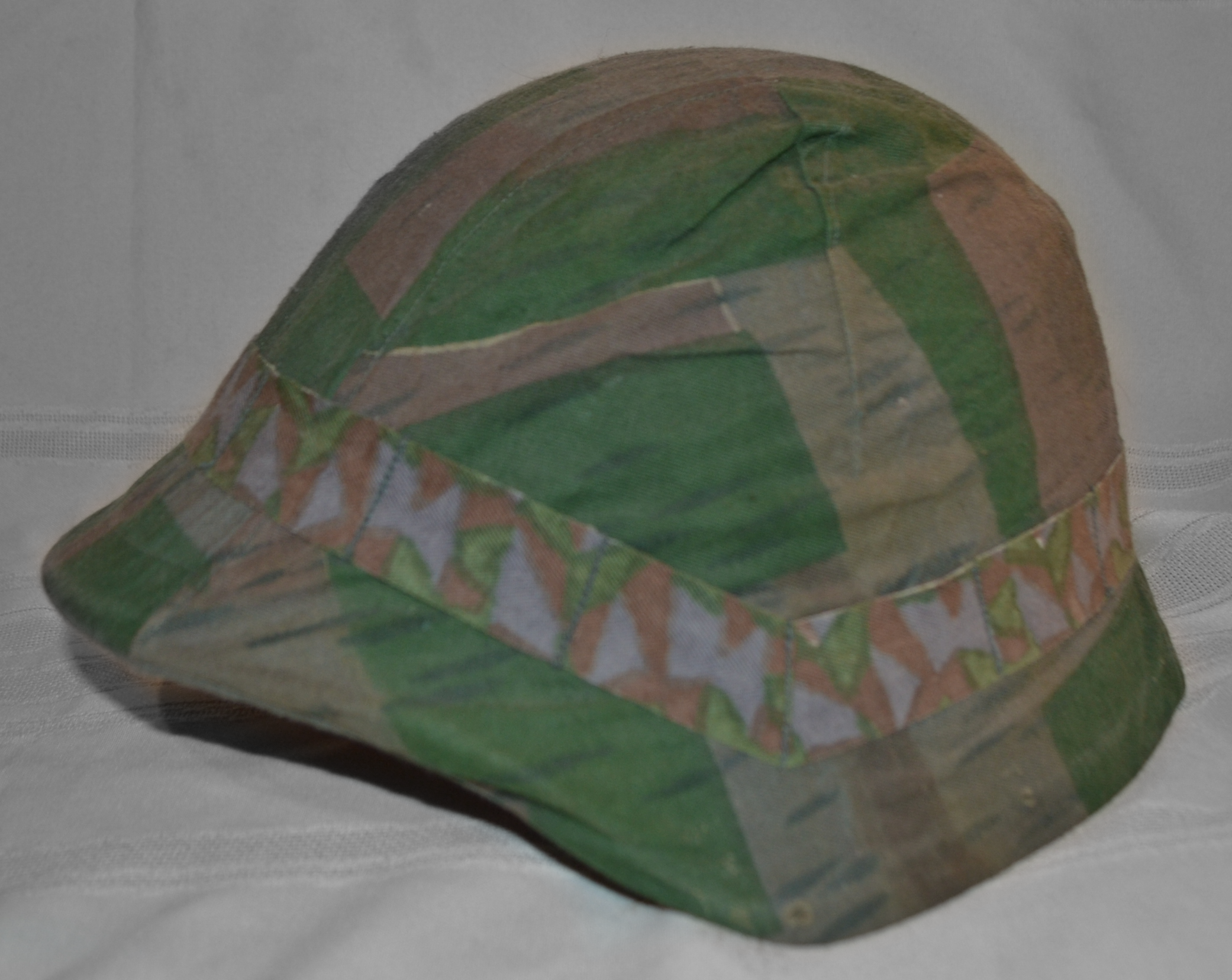
Summer side of the reversible cover for the helmet.

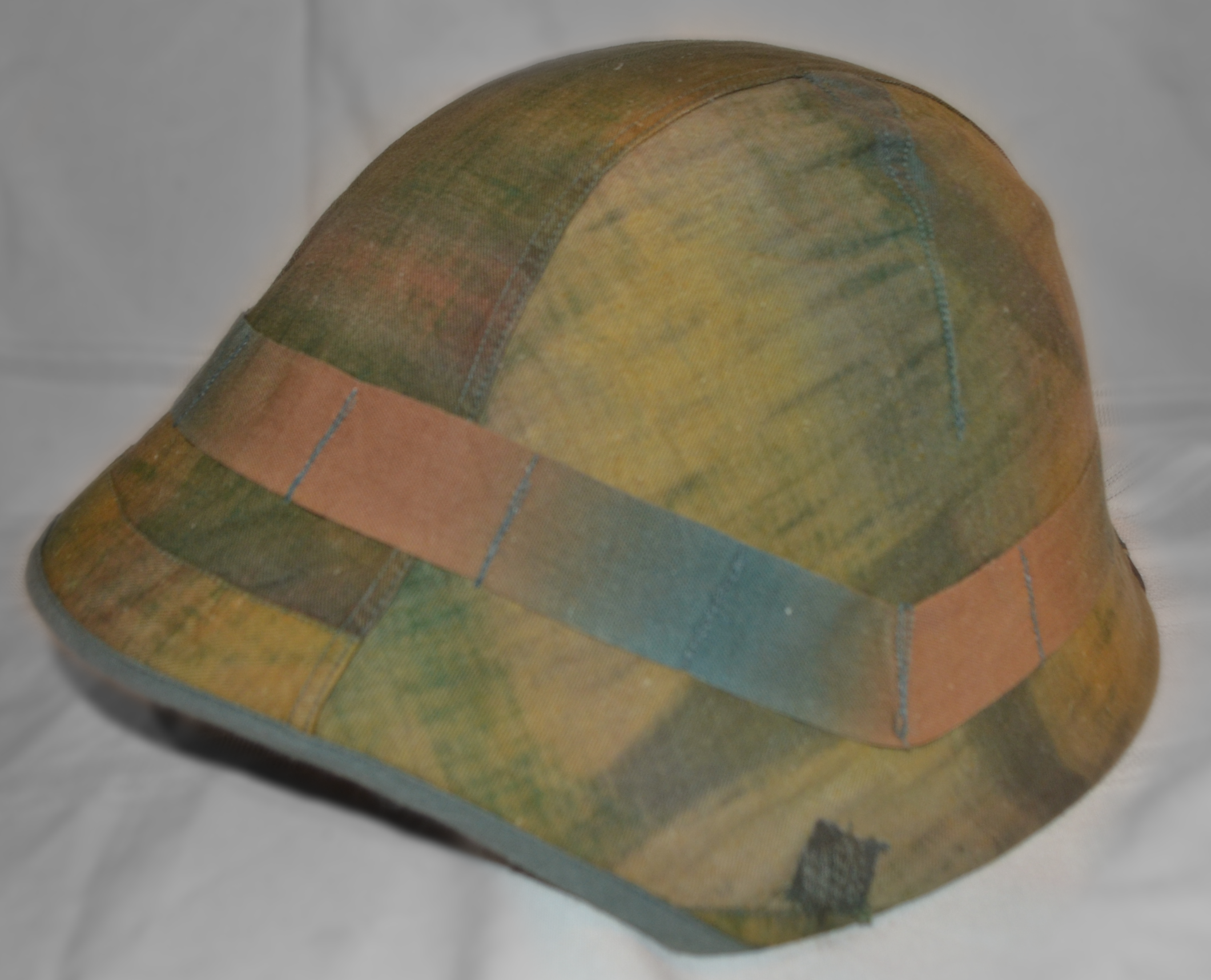
Autumn side of the cover.

The M1918 helmet (also known as the M18) is a Swiss steel combat helmet that was used by the Swiss Armed Forces starting from 1918 until its gradual replacement by the M1971 helmet in the late 20th century.

== Design ==
The design was drawn up by Dr. Edward A. Gessler and Paul Boesh. Dr. Edward was director of the Swiss National Museum, while Boesh was a sculptor serving in the Swiss General staff as a Lieutenant.

The M1918's shape drew from the German M16 Stahlhelm and was at times confused with the coincidentally developed experimental U.S combat helmet Model 5 which shared a near-exact shape and liner design. The shell being made from 1.15 mm manganese steel and painted in olive drab with the liner being similar to the M16 Stahlhelm's liner with its three pads and clamp and hook chin strap attaching directly to the liner.

In 1940, a new variant of the M18 was made, but with a shallower skirt. This variant was designated the M18/40. Later in 1943, most M18s and M18/40s were given a coat of matte black paint mixed with sawdust for a textured finish, as well as a new liner that only went around three-quarters of the circumference of the shell's inside. This variant was designated the M18/43. The final designation of the M1918 was the M18/63, which featured a more comfortable liner.

Camouflage covers for the M18 were introduced in 1942 and were reversible from one of two patterns depending on the season. A second type of camouflage cover was later adopted in 1956 featuring a variant of the Swiss TAZ 57 camouflage pattern.

A lightweight aluminum version of the M18 was produced for the Swiss civil defense, painted in fluorescent yellow.

== Users ==
=== Former ===
- Switzerland
- Argentina - The M18 was exported to Argentina in the late 1930s and issued as the M1938, Argentina's first steel combat helmet.

== Bibliography ==
- Bashford, Dean (1920). Helmets and Body Armor in Modern Warfare. Yale University Press.
- Brayley, Martin J. (2008). Tin Hats to Composite Helmets: A Collector's Guide. Crowood Press UK. ISBN 978-1847970244.
