= Swiss M1971 Helmet =

Swiss helmet

M1971 Helmet
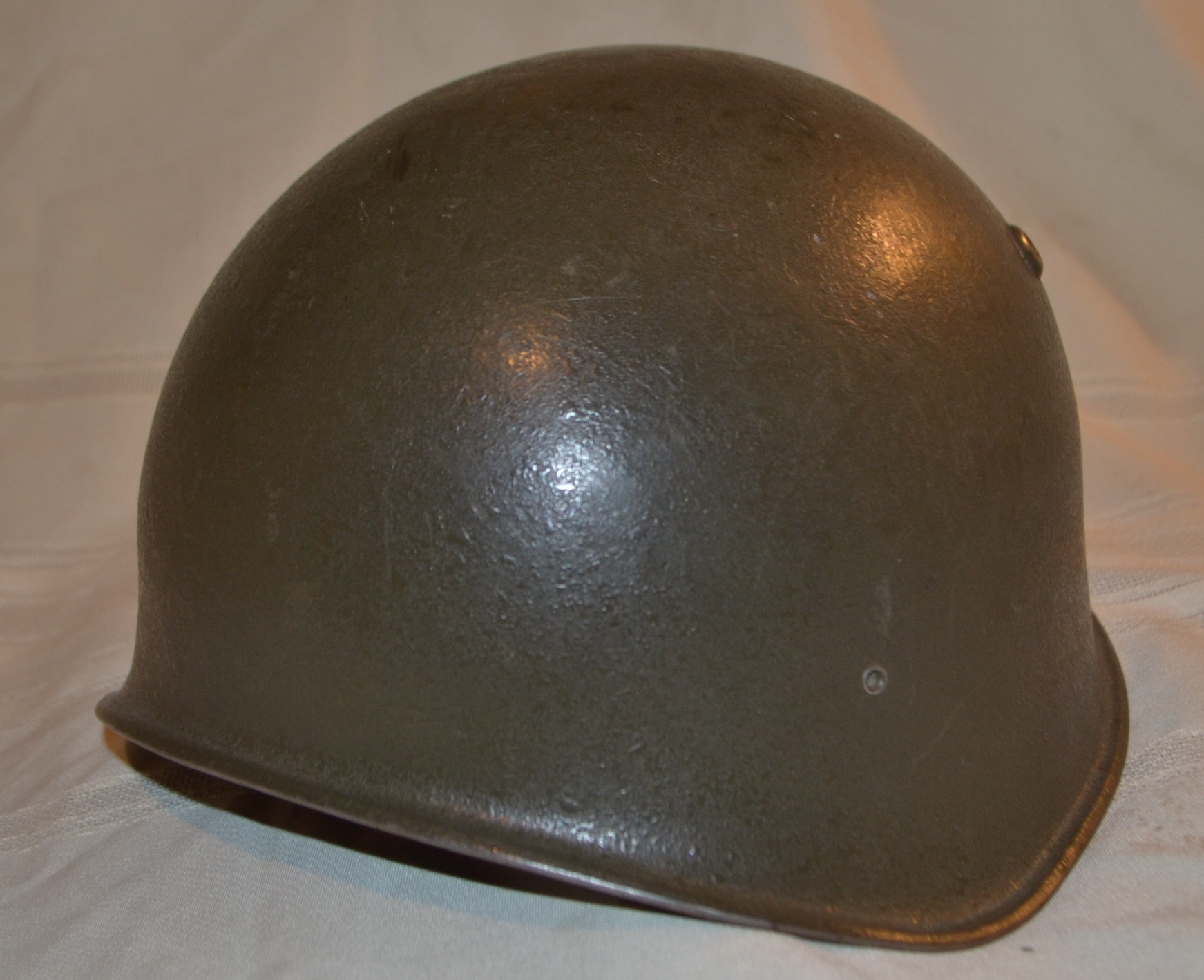
- An OD M1971 Helmet
- Type: Combat helmet
- Place of origin: Switzerland

Service history
- In service: 1975 - 2018 (Switzerland)
- Used by: Switzerland, Mauritania

Production history
- Designed: 1971

Specifications
- Weight: 1.4 kg - 1.5 kg

The M1971 helmet (Also known as M71) is a military steel combat helmet used by Switzerland from its formal introduction in 1975 until its gradual replacement by the Schuberth B826 (known in Switzerland as the Schutzhelm 04 (in German) or casque de protection balistique 04 (in French)).

== Design ==
The shell is of a near hemispherical shape with prominent flares on both sides and stamped in 1.15mm steel. It includes four rivets where the liner attaches to the shell. The shell is painted a matte dark olive green with a textured finish. Towards the rear two vent holes are present around the same spot and construction as the previous M18 and M18/40 models.

The liner itself consists of a metal band running the inside circumference with a foam spacer between it and the shell. Attached to the band are four leather pads, affixed to the rear of these is a leather pouch where simple pieces of thick felt are used for sizing to one's head. A drawstring connects all four pads for further sizing. The chinstrap is a four-point setup with the straps attaching to the shell in the same place the liner itself does.

Both chin straps connecting with a simple hook and catch system. A cover in TAZ 83 pattern camouflage was produced for the helmet, with four hooks to attach to the shell and a pull string to size it accordingly. A cover in TAZ 90 pattern camouflage was also made, with it having the same basic construction.

== Users ==
=== Current ===
- Mauritania - seen in use by Mauritian forces during a counter-terrorism operation in Mali

=== Former ===
- Switzerland

== Bibliography ==
- Brayley, Martin J. (2008). Tin Hats to Composite Helmets: A Collector's Guide. Crowood Press UK. ISBN 978-1847970244.
