= Yurka-class minesweeper =

Class overview
- Name: Project 266 Rubin
- Operators: Soviet Navy; Egyptian Navy; Vietnam People's Navy
- Preceded by: T58-class minesweeper
- Succeeded by: Natya-class minesweeper
- In commission: 1963-1990s
- Completed: 52

General characteristics
- Displacement: 540 tons
- Length: 52 meters
- Beam: 9.4 meters
- Draught: 2.6 meters
- Propulsion: 2 M-503 Diesel engines 5000 hp
- Speed: 16 knots (30 km/h)
- Range: 1,500 nautical miles (2,778.0 km) at 12 knots (22 km/h)
- Endurance: 7 days
- Crew: 68 (6 officers)
- Electronic warfare & decoys: Minesweeping: AT-2 acoustic sweep; GKT-2 contact sweep; TEM-3 magnetic sweep
- Armament: 2х2-30 mm AK-230; 2 х5 RBU 1200; 7 AMD-1000 naval mines or 32 depth charges; underwater mine searcher MKT-210; Sweeps BKT, AT-3, TEM-4

The Yurka class is a NATO reporting name for Project 266 Rubin, a group of minesweepers built for the Soviet Navy and export customers between 1963 and 1970.

== Design ==
A new ocean minesweeper design was requested in 1957 to follow the T43 class minesweeper into the Soviet Navy. The design was approved in 1959 and entered service in 1963. Major improvements in mine detection and anti mine explosion protection were implemented. Magnetic, acoustic and electric signatures were reduced. The hull was built of low magnetic steel.

== Ships ==
=== Soviet Navy ===
About 41 ships were built for the Soviet Navy, One ship was lost to an accidental explosion in the Black Sea in 1989. All the Ships were decommissioned by the mid-1990s

=== Egyptian Navy ===
Fours ships transferred in 1969 - in service 2008

=== Vietnam Navy ===
Two ships transferred in 1979 - in service 2008

== See also ==
- List of ships of the Soviet Navy
- List of ships of Russia by project number
