= INS Kozhikode =

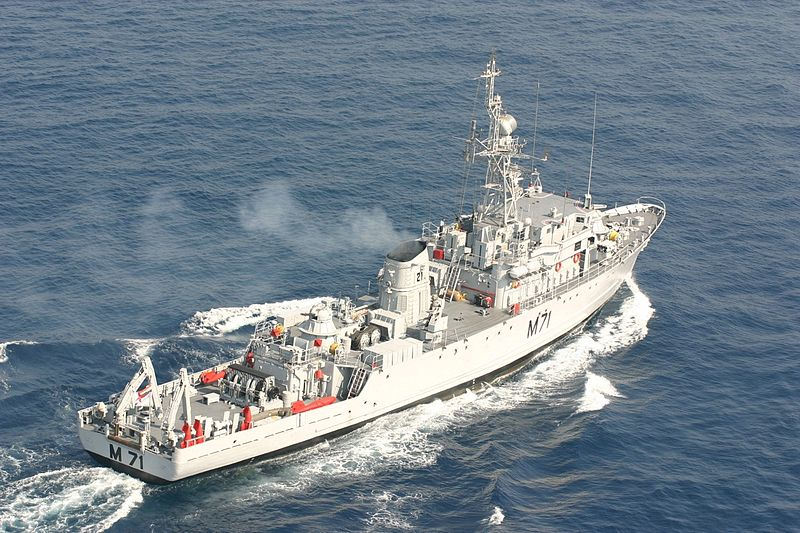
- INS Kozhikode

History

India
- Name: INS Kozhikode
- Namesake: Kozhikode
- Commissioned: 19 December 1988
- Decommissioned: 13 April 2019
- Identification: M71

General characteristics
- Class & type: Karwar-class minesweeper
- Displacement: 877 long tons (891 t) full load
- Length: 61 m (200 ft 2 in)
- Beam: 10.2 m (33 ft 6 in)
- Draft: 2.7 m (8 ft 10 in)
- Propulsion: 2 × M-503B diesels, 2 shafts, 5,000 bhp (3,700 kW)
- Speed: 16 knots (30 km/h; 18 mph)
- Range: 4,000 nmi (7,400 km) at 10 knots (19 km/h; 12 mph); 3,000 nmi (5,600 km) at 12 knots (22 km/h; 14 mph)
- Complement: 10 officers, 72 enlisted
- Sensors & processing systems: Sonar: MG-69/79 High frequency, hull mounted, active mine detection; Radar: Don 2 I-band air/surface; 2 × Square Head - High Pole B IFF; MR-104 Drum Tilt H/I-band fire control
- Electronic warfare & decoys: Minesweeping: AT-2 acoustic sweep; GKT-2 contact sweep; TEM-3 magnetic sweep
- Armament: 4 × 30 mm (2×2) guns; 4 × 25 mm (2×2) AA; 2 × RBU 1200 5-tubed ASW rocket; 10 mines; 2 × 16 SA-N-5 SAM Grail missiles

INS Kozhikode (M71) was a minesweeper of the Karwar class, of similar design to the Pondicherry-class ships that were in service with the Indian Navy till 2012. Built by the Sredne-Nevskiy Shipyard at Saint Petersburg, Russia. Except for the addition of surface-to-air missiles. Kozhikode is a modified Natya-class minesweeper. The ship took part in the International Fleet Review 2016 that was held off the coast of Visakhapatnam.

The ship was decommissioned from the fleet on 13 April 2019.
