= Leibermuster =

German WWII military camouflage pattern

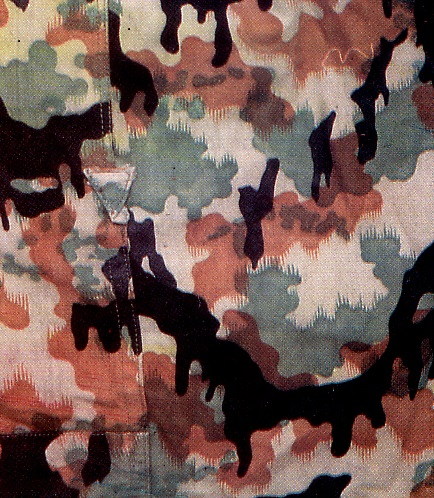
- Closeup of Leibermuster
- Type: Military camouflage pattern
- Place of origin: Nazi Germany

Service history
- In service: 1945
- Used by: Heer; Waffen-SS
- Wars: World War II

Production history
- Designer: Leiber brothers

Leibermuster is a German military camouflage pattern first used in 1945. It was the last of a family of German World War II camouflage patterns. The pattern (named after its designers, the Leiber brothers) was issued on a very limited basis to combat units before the war ended. It consists of bold irregular areas of black printed over brown and green on a pale background.

Reproduction Leibermuster uniforms made in China and Turkey, created for collectors and reenactors, have become available on the market through European vendors. After the war, Leibermuster was the basis for the "Alpenflage" issued to the Swiss army until the 1990s.

== History ==
In the 1950s, there was consideration for acquiring the Leibermuster for the Belgian military with 20,000 uniforms, but it was never adopted.

== Development ==
The pattern was intended to provide some degree of camouflage in the infrared. It was the first pattern to be issued to both regular army (Wehrmacht) and Waffen-SS units. All known original images of the Leibermuster depict Wehrmacht soldiers stationed in former Czechoslovakia. There are no known images of Waffen-SS members wearing the Leibermuster.
