= INS Cuddalore (M69) =

Minesweeper

History

India
- Name: INS Cuddalore
- Namesake: Cuddalore
- Commissioned: 29 October 1987
- Decommissioned: 23 March 2018
- Identification: M69

General characteristics
- Class & type: Pondicherry-class minesweeper
- Displacement: 877 long tons (891 t) full load
- Length: 61 m (200 ft 2 in)
- Beam: 10.2 m (33 ft 6 in)
- Draft: 2.7 m (8 ft 10 in)
- Propulsion: 2 × M-503B diesels, 2 shafts, 5,000 bhp (3,700 kW)
- Speed: 16 knots (30 km/h; 18 mph)
- Range: 4,000 nmi (7,400 km) at 10 knots (19 km/h; 12 mph); 3,000 nmi (5,600 km) at 12 knots (22 km/h; 14 mph)
- Complement: 10 officers, 72 enlisted
- Sensors & processing systems: Sonar: MG-69/79 High frequency, hull mounted, active mine detection; Radar: Don 2 I-band air/surface; 2 × Square Head - High Pole B IFF; MR-104 Drum Tilt H/I-band fire control
- Electronic warfare & decoys: Minesweeping: AT-2 acoustic sweep; GKT-2 contact sweep; TEM-3 magnetic sweep
- Armament: 4 × 30 mm (2×2) guns; 4 × 25 mm (2×2) AA; 2 × RBU 1200 5-tubed ASW rocket; 10 mines; 2 × 16 SA-N-5 SAM Grail missiles

INS Cuddalore (M69) was a modified Natya-class minesweeper of the Pondicherry class ships that were in service with the Indian Navy.

== Construction and commissioning ==
Cuddalore was built by the Sredne-Nevskiy Shipyard at Saint Petersburg, Russia. Except for the addition of surface-to-air missiles. Cuddalore was commissioned on 29 October 1987 at Riga (erstwhile USSR). Her commissioning commanding officer was Rear Admiral PK Nair.

== Service history ==
Cuddalore was based at Indian Navy's Eastern Naval Command in Visakhapatnam and was operationally under the authority of the Naval Officer-in-Charge Andhra Pradesh region. She was the senior ship of the 21st Mine Counter measures (MCM) Squadron. Cuddalore was adjudged as the "best ship" at the Eastern Naval Command (ENC)’s annual flotilla awards ceremony for the year 2015–16.

== Decommissioning ==
Cuddalore was decommissioned on 23 March 2018 at the naval dockyard in Visakhapatnam.
