= INS Pondicherry =

Indian naval ship

History

India
- Name: INS Pondicherry
- Namesake: Pondicherry
- Commissioned: 2 February 1978
- Decommissioned: 5 October 2007
- Status: Out of service

General characteristics
- Class & type: Pondicherry class minesweeper
- Displacement: 804 tons full load
- Propulsion: 2 diesel engines; 2 shafts, cp props, 5,000 hp
- Speed: 16 knots (30 km/h)
- Range: 3,000 mi (4,800 km) at 12 knots (22 km/h)
- Complement: 82 (incl. 10 officers)
- Sensors & processing systems: Air/Surface; 1 x Don 2 radar at I-band frequency; IFF; 2 x (NATO: Square Head - High Pole B) radars; Sonar; MG-69/79, hull mounted which has active mine detection, with high frequency
- Armament: 4 × 30 mm guns, 4 × 25 mm guns, 2 × RBU-1200 5-tubed fixed mortars, Fitted to carry 10 mines

INS Pondicherry (M61) was a Pondicherry class minesweeper in service with the Indian Navy, built by the Sredne-Nevskiy Shipyard at Saint Petersburg in Russia. She was the lead ship of this class. Pondicherry served the Indian Navy from 1978 to 2007. She was named after Puducherry, a union territory of India which at the time was known as Pondicherry.

On 15 February 1989 Pondicherry was painted white and used as the Presidential yacht for the Fleet Review by President R. Venkataraman. She reverted to her normal role and colour on completion. She was based at Mumbai.
