= Exail Technologies =

French technology company

- Type: Public
- Traded as: Euronext Paris: EXAIL
- Industry: Technology
- Founded: 2022
- Headquarters: La Garde, Var, France
- Area served: Worldwide
- Key people: Raphaël Gorgé (Chairman & CEO)
- Products: Unmanned underwater vehicles, Unmanned surface vehicles, inertial and navigation sensors, optical components
- Revenue: ▲€398 million (2024)
- Net income: ▼€−4 million (2024)
- Number of employees: 2,000 (2024)
- Website: www.exail.com

Exail Technologies (written as EXAIL) is a French technology company based in La Garde (Département Var). The group was formed in 2022 from the merger of drone and robotics specialist ECA Group and navigation and photonics provider iXblue. Exail develops unmanned systems, inertial and navigation sensors, and optical components for civil and military applications and is represented in around 80 countries. In 2024, the family-run company generated sales of around €373 million with approximately 2,000 employees. According to the company, Exail generates around 56 percent of its sales in the defense sector, while 44 percent comes from civilian applications. The group is listed on the Paris Stock Exchange, has been a member of the SBF 120 index since 2025, and is part of the “Euronext Tech Leaders” segment.

== History ==
The company's origins date back to Etudes et Constructions Aéronautiques (ECA), which was founded in Toulon in 1936 and initially developed equipment for aviation and the navy. In the 1970s, ECA introduced one of the first autonomous underwater mine clearance drones, the remote-controlled “Poisson Auto-Propulsé” (PAP). After its acquisition by the French family-owned Groupe Gorgé in 1992, the robotics business was expanded, followed in the early 2000s by autonomous submersibles such as the deep-sea AUV ALISTAR 3000. At the same time, the high-tech company iXblue was founded in 2000, specializing in inertial navigation, maritime autonomy, and photonics.

In the 2010s, ECA expanded its range of unmanned surface and underwater vehicles for mine countermeasures and survey tasks. In 2019, together with French shipbuilder Naval Group, it won a contract to supply twelve mine hunting systems for the Belgian and Dutch navies; Exail's share is reported to be around €450 million.

In mid-2022, Groupe Gorgé announced the acquisition of iXblue and the merger of the two companies to form Exail. According to the manufacturer, the combination created a new company with complementary business areas – iXblue contributed around 750 employees and a sales network in more than 60 countries, while ECA brought autonomous robotics expertise to the table. The combined order backlog of the two companies was over €620 million at the end of 2021 and rose to over €1 billion by 2025.

== Activities ==
Exail sees itself as a vertically integrated high-tech conglomerate that develops and manufactures robotics, navigation, and photonics products. Its core business areas are maritime robotics (unmanned surface and underwater vehicles), navigation and positioning sensors, and optical and photonic components for space and quantum technologies. According to the company, Exail is active in more than 80 countries and is a contractor for civil and government clients.

=== Maritime robotics and autonomous systems ===
Exail's ECA division develops unmanned surface and underwater systems for mine countermeasures, surveying, and reconnaissance. The portfolio includes the UMIS (Unmanned Mine Countermeasures Integrated System), which consists of the Inspector 90 unmanned surface drone, a launch and recovery system, the Seascan inspection ROV, the K-STER disposable drone for mine clearance, and the Umisoft software. This system was selected for the Indonesian Navy in 2024/25, among others.

In addition to mine countermeasure systems, Exail offers unmanned surface vessels from the DriX series. The 8-meter-long DriX drone generation from 2017 is used for hydrographic surveying and maritime surveillance and operates in 19 countries. In September 2025, Exail unveiled a 16-meter prototype that autonomously traveled approximately 1,100 nautical miles from southern France through the Strait of Gibraltar to the Iberian Peninsula to participate in the NATO exercise REPMUS.

On 14 May 2026, India-based Larsen & Toubro (L&T) announced its strategic partnership with Exail Technologies to deliver an advanced Unmanned Mine Counter-Measure (MCM) Suite for the Mine Counter Measure Vessels (MCMVs) programme of the Indian Navy. Under the partnership, L&T will act as the prime contractor, while Exail Technologies will serve as the technology partner. Together, they will offer the integrated system to all shipyards competing for the Indian Navy’s MCMV programme.

=== Navigation and sensor technology ===
The second business area comprises inertial navigation systems (INS) and motion sensors based on fiber optic gyroscopes. Exail's technology is used in ships, submarines, UUVs, and UAV drones. According to the company, more than 50 naval forces use its systems. In the summer of 2025, Exail received an order to supply 100 compact Phins Compact inertial systems to an unnamed US UUV manufacturer. Shortly before, the Spanish Ministry of Defense had selected UmiX 40 systems for the new tactical SIRTAP drone. At the same time, the French defense procurement agency DGA ordered a simulator system for training purposes.

=== Photonics, aerospace, and other activities ===
The former iXblue unit of Exail develops optical components, laser and fiber optic systems for space, telecommunications, and scientific applications. These technologies are also used in quantum sensors, satellite propulsion, and deep-sea exploration. In addition, Exail produces guided missile simulators, aviation test equipment, and land robotics applications.
