= T58-class minesweeper =

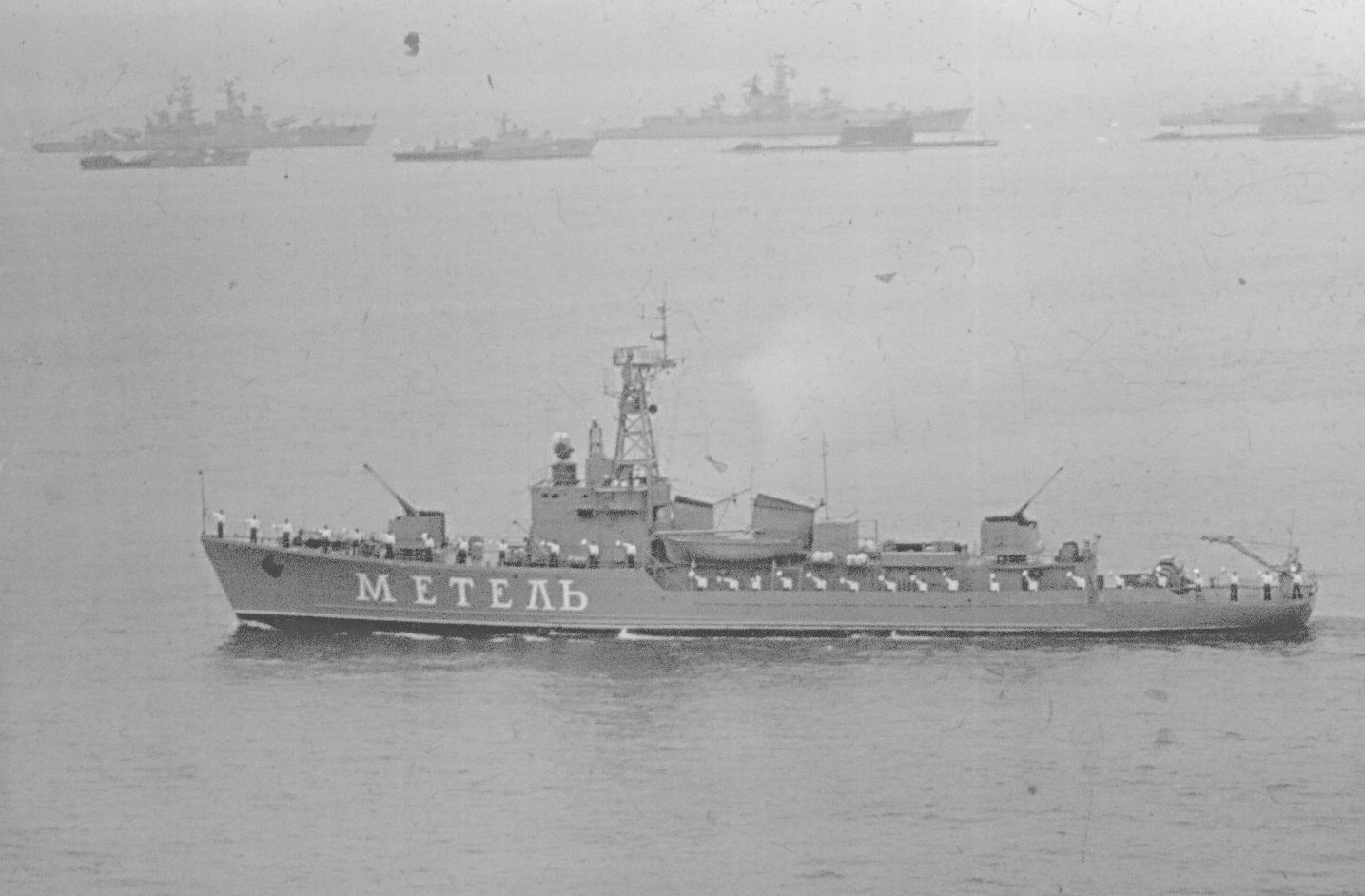

Class overview
- Name: T58 class (Project 264)
- Operators: Soviet Navy
- Preceded by: T43 class
- Succeeded by: Yurka class
- Built: 1957–1961
- In commission: 1957–1993
- Completed: 24
- Retired: 24

General characteristics
- Type: Minesweeper
- Displacement: 790 tons standard, 860 tons full load
- Length: 70.1 m (230 ft 0 in)
- Beam: 9 m (29 ft 6 in)
- Draught: 2.4 m (7 ft 10 in)
- Propulsion: 2 shaft diesel engines 4,000 hp (3,000 kW)
- Speed: 18 knots (33 km/h; 21 mph)
- Range: 3,800 nmi (7,000 km; 4,400 mi) at 10 knots (19 km/h; 12 mph)
- Complement: 82
- Armament: 2 × twin 57 mm (2.2 in) guns; 2 × twin 25 mm (0.98 in) guns; 1 depth charge thrower; up to 32 mines; Sweeps MT-1, MTSh

The T58 class were a group of minesweepers built for the Soviet Navy in the 1950s. The Soviet designation was Project 264.

== Design ==
The specification for these ships was issued in 1949 and the lead ship was completed in 1957. These ships were larger than the previous T43 class and had increased sweep capacity and were fitted with more advanced mechanical, acoustic and magnetic sweeps. Heavier self-defence weapons were also fitted. The ships had steel hulls and were powered by three diesel engines (which were located on two levels to minimise length). No special provision was made to minimise acoustic or pressure signature. The ships were also fitted to operate in an NBC environment.

=== Variants ===
- Project 254 A – built from 1958 - Improved silencing and degaussing gear, new sonar and radar, 30 mm guns instead of 25 mm and RBU-2500 anti-submarine mortars
- Radar Picket version - 3 units converted early 1970s. Fitted with P-10 air search radar installation aft replacing one twin 57 mm gun turret
- Patrol ship - 19 units transferred to the Border Guard, served until the early 1990s
- Valdai-class submarine rescue ship - 7 units fitted with diving support equipment

== Ships ==
45 ships were built between 1957 and 1962. All were scrapped by the early 1990s.

== See also ==
- List of ships of the Soviet Navy
- List of ships of Russia by project number
