= Future Mine Counter Measure Vessels (India) =

Class of Indian minehunters

Class overview
- Name: Future MCMV
- Operators: Indian Navy
- Preceded by: Pondicherry-class minesweeper
- Planned: 12

General characteristics
- Type: Mine-countermeasure vessel
- Displacement: 1,000 tonnes

Mine Counter Measure Vessels are series of twelve multi-purpose mine countermeasure vessels for the Indian Navy proposed to be jointly built by Goa Shipyard Limited (GSL) with a foreign partner to transfer technology of equipment for anti-mine operations.

== History ==
=== Past attempts ===
==== 1st attempt ====
In May 2004, the Indian Ministry of Defence (MOD) approved a Mine Counter-Measures Vessel (MCMV) programme. The plan was to initially procure 8 MCMVs to replace the 12 existing Soviet-origin Pondicherry-class minesweeper that had been in service for the last 25 to 30 years. The ships were proposed to be built by the Goa Shipyard Limited (GSL).

The ships were to feature :–

1. High-resolution sonar for mine detection
2. Remote-controlled mine disposal systems to neutralise the mines
3. Lightweight reinforced composite hull to reduce their acoustic and magnetic signatures and better resist underwater explosions
4. Lifespan: 30 years
5. Maximum speed: 30 knots
6. Endurance: 10 days

As per the plans, a Request for Tender (RFT) was sent to Italy's Intermarine, South Korea's Kangnam Corp. and Spain's IZAR (now Navantia) for construction and/or technology assistance for the MCMVs. Subsequently, a Request for Proposal (RFP) for mine detection and neutralising equipment was sent to France's Thales and ECA, Germany's Atlas Elektronik and Spain's FABA.

In 2008, the Ministry of Defence (MoD) invited bids for 8 MCMVs from France's DCN International (now Naval Group), Italy's Fincantieri, Spain's IZAR, South Korea's Kangnam Corp. and Northrop Grumman of the US.

Kangnam emerged as the winning bidder and concluded price negotiation with MoD in October 2011. As per the deal, the first two MCMVs would be directly delivered by the foreign shipyard at the cost of ₹2,700 crore (equivalent to ₹61 billion or US$630 million in 2026) by 2016 for user acceptance trials. The rest of six ships would be built by GSL at the cost of ₹6,000 crore (equivalent to ₹130 billion or US$1.4 billion in 2026) and delivered by 2018. However, in November 2011, Attorney General Mukul Rohatgi held the firm guilty of employing defence agents to seal the deal. Subsequently, the entire procurement process was scrapped.

==== 2nd attempt ====
In February 2015, due to the urgent re-requirement of the ships, the Defence Acquisition Council (DAC) nominated GSL for the construction of 12 MCMVs at a cost of ₹32,640 crore (equivalent to ₹480 billion or US$4.9 billion in 2026). In September 2015, GSL floated a global expression of interest (EOI) from companies willing to transfer technology to build the vessels. On 11 January 2016, Kangnam Corporation responded and was the sole respondent to the EOI, leading to a single vendor situation. By then, the Pondicherry-class minesweeper were set to be decommissioned by 2018. As of April 2017, the deal was expected to be signed by the end of the year. However, the deal did not go through as reported in January 2018. Kangnam did not since "differences persisted over the transfer of technology and cost". The South Korean firm demanded $1 billion as technology transfer fee and "refused to provide intellectual property rights and production support guarantees" which the Defence Ministry did not accept. The negotiations had started in 2016. As per the original timeline, the construction of the first vessel was expected to begin in April 2018 with deliveries to be completed between April 2021 and April 2026. However, this was pushed back as the contract was cancelled again.

==== 3rd attempt ====
On 21 March 2018, another EOI was floated for the same reason to South Korea's Kangnam Corporation, Italy's Intermarine, Spain's Navantia, Germany's ThyssenKrupp, and Russian Shipyards. Responses was received from a Russian shipyard and Intermarine. Meanwhile, the Navy also updated the qualitative requirements so that the MCMVs fit into the modern technologies after the delays of its induction The Russian offer was a variant of its Alexandrit-class minesweepers which had integrated drones for anti-mine operations.

In August 2021, due to the delays in the procurement, a request for information was released to lease four in-service/decommissioned mine countermeasure vessels. The first vessel is to be inducted within 10 months of contract signing with the others following within 4 months each.

Until the MCMVs are delivered, the upcoming Samarthak-class Multi Purpose Vessel are planned to partially fulfil the Navy's requirement.

=== Current status ===
In August 2023, released a fresh Request for Information (RFI) for 12 vessels to integrate the capabilities of anti-submarine warfare and mine countermeasures vessels which can operate Remotely Operated Vehicles (ROVs) and underwater drones. The vessels would also feature advanced hull-mounted and towed array sonars for submarine and mine detection. The order would be split between the lowest (L1) and second-lowest bidding (L2) shipyards in 8:4 ratio and would be delivered between 2030 and 2037. The L3 bidder would need to match the cost of the L1 bidder to get the contract.

As of May 2025, the procurement case for 12 MCMVs will be presented to the Defence Acquisition Council (DAC) to approve the project worth ₹44,000 crore (equivalent to ₹450 billion or US$4.7 billion in 2026). This will be followed by issuing the Request for Proposal (RFP), which is the formal tender, to the Indian shipyards for their techno-commercial bids for the acquisition. The rolling out of the first vessel is expected after seven to eight years of signing the contract. The vessels, with non-magnetic hulls and high-definition sonar, will have a displacement of around 1,000 tonnes. The Indian Navy has a total requirement of 24 MCMVs.

On 3 July 2025, the Defence Acquisition Council — under the Ministry of Defence and chaired by Defence Minister Rajnath Singh — authorised the Acceptance of Necessity (AoN) for the project. As of 18 November, the Request for Proposal (RfP) of the Project 17B-class frigate followed by the same for the MCMV project is expected to be released within 3–4 months.

On 14 May 2026, Larsen & Toubro (L&T) announced its strategic partnership with France-based Exail Technologies to deliver an advanced Unmanned Mine Counter-Measure (MCM) Suite for the MCMV programme of the Indian Navy. Under the partnership, L&T will act as the prime contractor, while Exail Technologies will serve as the technology partner. Together, they will offer the integrated system to all shipyards competing for the Indian Navy’s MCMV programme.

== Specifications ==
- Displacement: 2,800 tons
- Length: 87 m
- Beam: 15 m
- Draft: 4.1 m
- Propulsion: CODOE configuration 2 × diesel engines and 2 × electric motors.
- Maximum speed: 20 knots
- Complement: <75
- Armament: 1 × 76 mm naval gun, 2 × 30 mm CIWS or DEW, 2 × 12.7 mm machine guns and containerized missile and loitering munitions (short to medium range) in 40-foot containers weighing up to 30 tonnes.
- Sonar: hull-mounted mine-hunting sonar and a forward looking mine & obstacle detection sonar
- Equipment: 2 × CASCADE ASV, 4 × HW-AUV and at least 20 × ROV.
- Aircraft: 1 × MULE multicopter or NSUAS

=== Mine-hunting gear ===
As stated in the Request for Information released in 2023, each ships would be equipped to launch, recover and operate two Compact Autonomous Surface Craft All Domain Effects (CASCADE) Autonomous Surface Vehicle (ASV), four Heavy Weight Autonomous Underwater Vehicle (HWAUV) along with a ship launched Multi Utility Long Endurance (MULE) multicopter or Naval Shipborne Unmanned Aerial System (NSUAS) and at least 20 Remotely Operated Vehicles (ROV).

The CASCADE ASVs would be tasked to carry HWUAVs and ROVs from the MCMV, identify, classify and neutralise the mines with towed acoustic and influence sweep equipment. While ASVs will coordinate with HWUAV to identify potential mines using side-scan and synthetic aperture sonars, identification, classification and neutralisation of mines is to be tasked to ROVs.

The unmanned rotorcraft (MULE or NSUAS) would provide situational awareness for the entire operation providing relay between ASV (equipped with integrated composite masts) and MCMV.

The dimensions as mentioned in the RFI are

- CASCADE ASV: 12 m long
- HWAUV: 1.5 tonnes, 5 m long and diameter of 21 inches diameter
- Remotely Operated Vehicle: 50 kg, 2 m long and diameter of 9 inches diameter

The development of CASCADE has been initiated and will have anti-submarine warfare role as well.

== See also ==
- Lerici-class minehunter
