= Natya-class minesweeper =

Soviet class of minesweepers

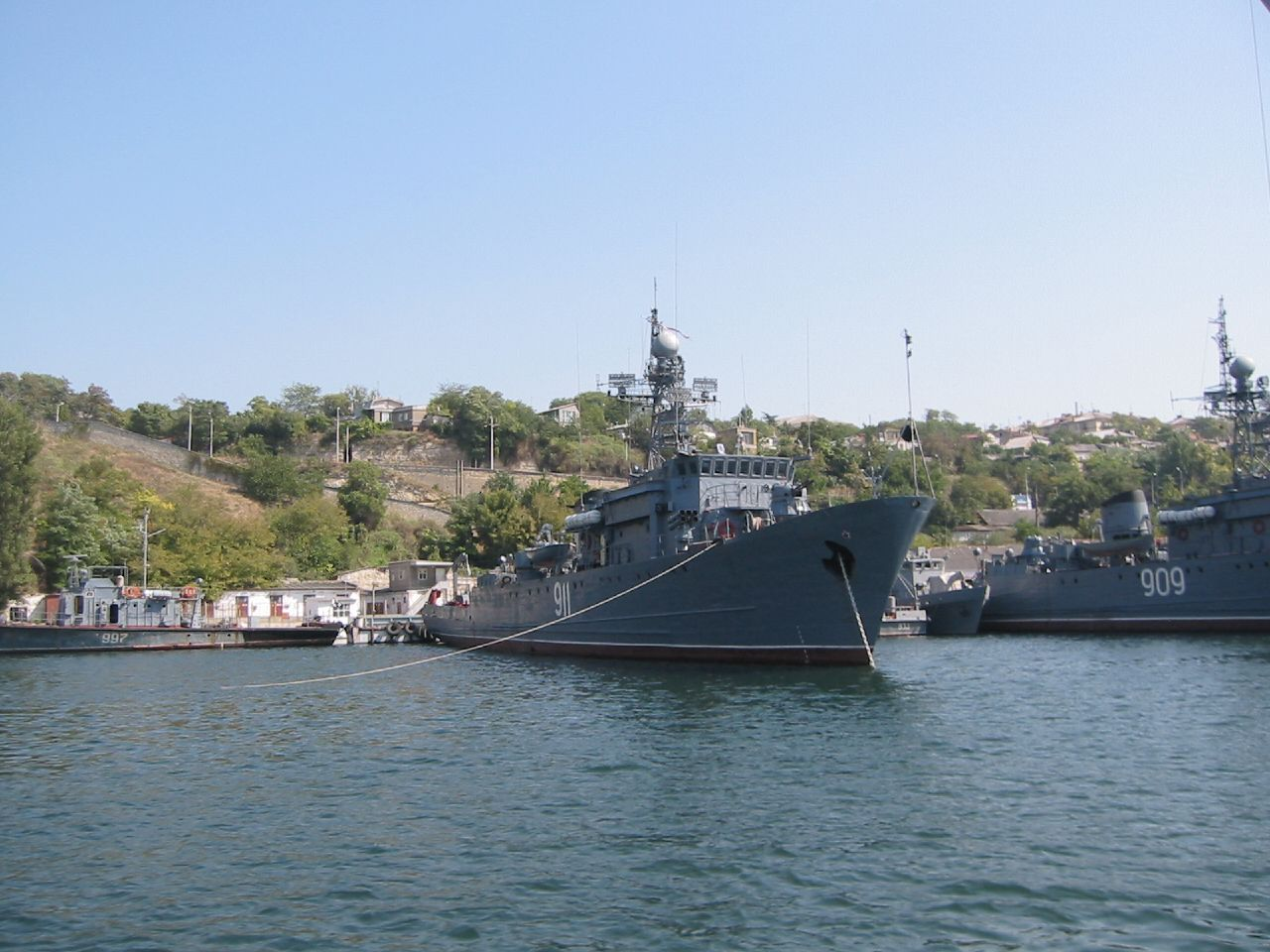
- Russian ocean minesweeper project 266M "Akvamarin" Ivan Golubets at Sevastopol, 2005

Class overview
- Name: Project 266M Akvamarin
- Builders: KB Baltic Zavod
- Operators: Soviet Navy; Russian Navy; Ukrainian Navy; Indian Navy; Libyan Navy; Syrian Navy; Yemeni Navy
- Preceded by: Yurka class
- Succeeded by: Gorya class
- Subclasses: Pondicherry class
- Built: 1970s–2001
- In commission: 1970–present
- Completed: 45

General characteristics
- Type: minesweeper
- Displacement: 873 tons
- Length: 61 m (200 ft 2 in)
- Beam: 10.2 m (33 ft 6 in)
- Draught: 3.6 m (11 ft 10 in)
- Propulsion: 2 × M-503 diesel engines 5,000 hp (3,700 kW)
- Speed: 17 knots (31 km/h; 20 mph)
- Range: 1,500 nmi (2,800 km; 1,700 mi) at 12 knots (22 km/h; 14 mph)
- Endurance: 7 days
- Crew: 68 (6 officers)
- Sensors & processing systems: Sonar: MG-69/79 High frequency, hull mounted, active mine detection; Radar: Don 2 I-band air/surface; 2 × Square Head - High Pole B IFF; MR-104 Rys' (NATO designation: "Drum Tilt") H/I-band fire control
- Electronic warfare & decoys: Minesweeping: AT-2 acoustic sweep; GKT-2 contact sweep; TEM-3 magnetic sweep
- Armament: 2 × AK-230 dual 30 mm autocannons; 2 × 2М-3М dual 25 mm autocannons; 2 × 5 RBU 1200; 7 AMD-1000 naval mines or 32 depth charges; underwater mine searcher MKT-210; Sweeps BKT, AT-3, TEM-4

The Natya class is the NATO reporting name for Project 266M Akvamarin, a class of minesweepers built for the Soviet Navy and export customers during the 1970s and 1980s. The ships were used for ocean minesweeping.

== Design ==
The design evolved from the Yurka-class minesweeper with new demining equipment including more advanced sonar and closed circuit TV. A stern ramp made recovering sweeps easier. The hull was built of low magnetic steel. The engines were mounted on sound dampening beams and shrouded propellers were used to reduce noise. An electrical field compensator was also installed. A single ship designated Natya 2 by NATO was built with an aluminium hull for reduced magnetic signature.

Ukrainian forces claimed to have sunk the minesweeper Kovrovets on 19 May 2024. At the same time, in other sources they claimed to sink the small missile ship Tsiklon. There are no independent confirmations or comments from the Russian Ministry of Defense.

== Project 02668 ==
- Displacement: 852 tons.
- Armament: 1 × 30mm AK-306 CIWS, 2 × 14.5 mm MTPU-1 machine guns, BKT high-speed pin sweep, TEM-4 electromagnetic sweep, AT-3 acoustic sweep, SZ-1 or SZ-2 depth charges, "Livadia" mine detector-finder.
- Crew: 60.

Project 02668 was designed by Design Bureau "Almaz" and is a prototype, which demonstrates the latest technology - the logical continuation of a series of Project 266ME. The minesweeper is equipped with the most modern means of anti-mine protection. It was the first Russian mine-sweeping ship to have an integrated navigation bridge and main command center, as well as the "Diez-E" automated control system of anti-mine action activities.

The St. Andrew's flag-raising ceremony was held on 17 January 2009, and the ship was accepted into the Russian Black Sea Fleet.

== Operators ==
45 ships were built for the Soviet Navy from 1970 to 1982.

Russian Navy

- 5 ships believed to remain in service as of 2025:
  - Black Sea Fleet - 3 ships (one possibly damaged in drone strike March 2026)
  - Pacific Fleet - 2 ships

Ukrainian Navy

- 2 captured by Russia.
  - Chernihiv (ex-Zenitchik - captured)
  - Cherkasy (captured)

Indian Navy

- 12 ships built for the Indian Navy in two batches between 1978 and 1988. Ship design was modified to Indian specifications. Known as the Pondicherry-class minesweeper in Indian service. All have since been decommissioned. These ships were to be replaced by GSL Mine Counter-Measure Vessels, but the project is currently on hold.

Libyan Navy

- 8 ships transferred 1981–86. 2 still in active

(Libya) Libyan People's Army

- 2 ships captured in February 2011.

Syrian Navy

- One ship in 1986.

Yemeni Navy

- One ship.

== See also ==
- List of ships of the Soviet Navy
- List of ships of Russia by project number
