= INS Karwar (M67) =

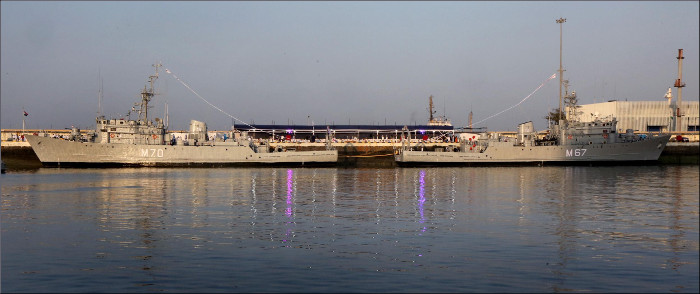
- INS Karwar (right) and INS Kakinada before their decommissioning ceremony.

History

India
- Name: INS Karwar
- Namesake: Karwar
- Commissioned: 14 July 1986
- Decommissioned: 9 May 2017
- Identification: M67

General characteristics
- Class & type: Karwar-class minesweeper
- Displacement: 877 long tons (891 t) full load
- Length: 61 m (200 ft 2 in)
- Beam: 10.2 m (33 ft 6 in)
- Draft: 2.7 m (8 ft 10 in)
- Propulsion: 2 × M-503B diesels, 2 shafts, 5,000 bhp (3,700 kW)
- Speed: 16 knots (30 km/h; 18 mph)
- Range: 4,000 nmi (7,400 km) at 10 knots (19 km/h; 12 mph); 3,000 nmi (5,600 km) at 12 knots (22 km/h; 14 mph)
- Complement: 10 officers, 72 enlisted
- Sensors & processing systems: Sonar: MG-69/79 High frequency, hull mounted, active mine detection; Radar: Don 2 I-band air/surface; 2 × Square Head - High Pole B IFF; MR-104 Drum Tilt H/I-band fire control
- Electronic warfare & decoys: Minesweeping: AT-2 acoustic sweep; GKT-2 contact sweep; TEM-3 magnetic sweep
- Armament: 4 × 30 mm (2×2) guns; 4 × 25 mm (2×2) AA; 2 × RBU 1200 5-tubed ASW rocket; 10 mines; 2 × 16 SA-N-5 SAM Grail missiles

INS Karwar (M67) of the Karwar subclass was a Pondicherry-class minesweepers that was in service with the Indian Navy till 2012, built by the Sredne-Nevskiy Shipyard at Saint Petersburg in Russia except for the addition of surface-to-air missiles.

INS Karwar was the first of the Natya-class minesweepers acquired from the USSR. She was commissioned on 14 July 1986 in Riga (USSR) under the command of Commander RK Sinha. The ship operated from Vishakhapatnam till 2013 after which she was based at Mumbai. Her crew consisted of six officers and 90 sailors, INS Karwar had the motto Hamesha Tayyar ("Always ready"). The last commanding officer was Cdr Kaushik Dhar.

Karwar was decommissioned on 9 May 2017. The decommissioning left the country with only four minesweepers.
