= TAZ 83 =

Swiss Army military camouflage pattern

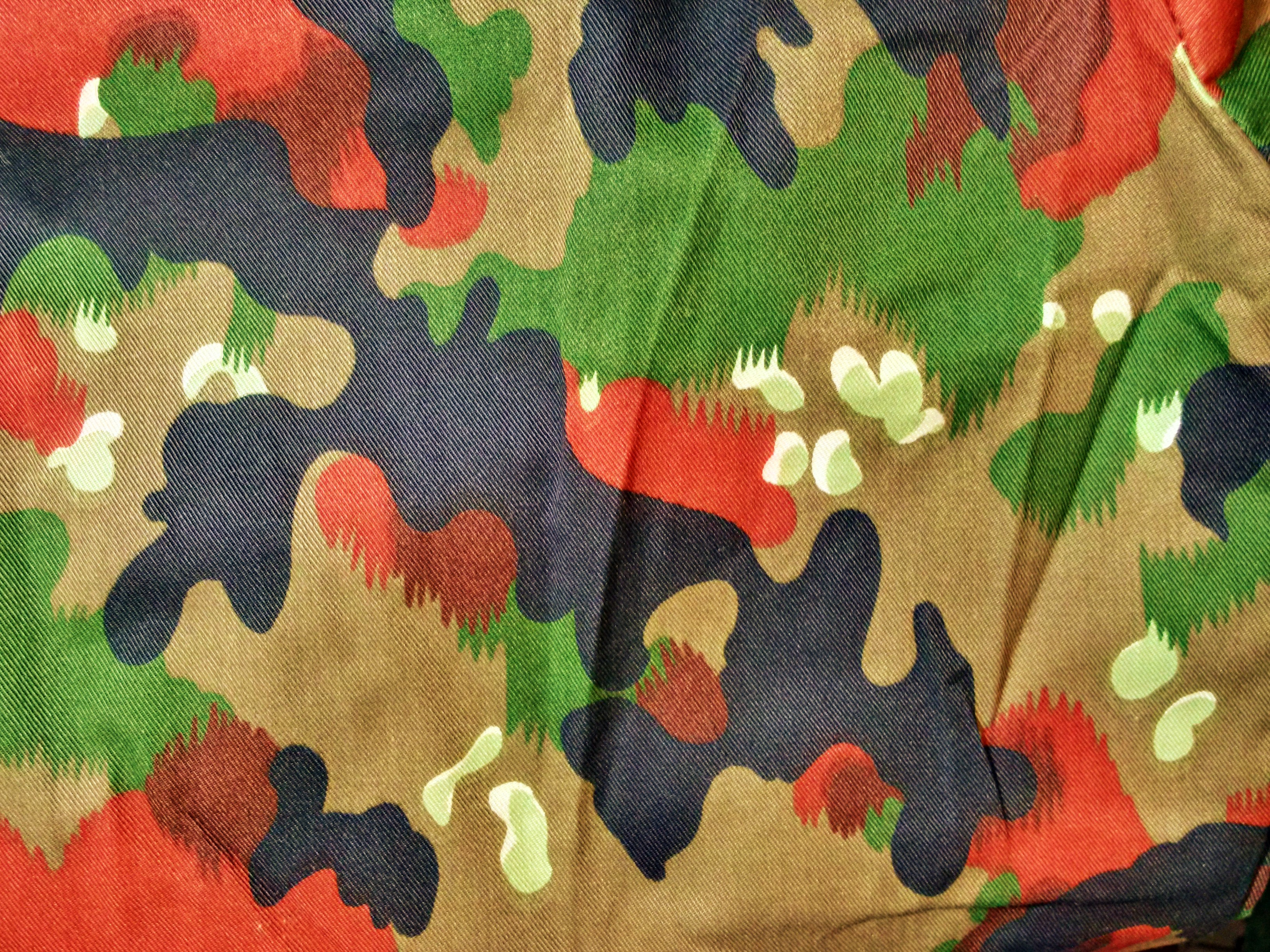
- Closeup of TAZ 83 fabric
- Type: Military camouflage pattern
- Place of origin: Switzerland

Service history
- In service: 1957-1993
- Used by: See Users
- Wars: Kosovo War

Production history
- Produced: 1957-1993

The TAZ 83 is a military camouflage pattern used by the Swiss Army for the Kampfanzug 57/70 (combat dress 57/70) and the TAZ 83 (Tarnanzug, camouflage dress 83). It also is known as "Alpenflage" or "pizza camouflage" among collectors of militaria. As military surplus camouflage clothing it came on to the army surplus market in the 1990s.

Swiss Militärblachen with the TAZ 83 pattern are still in use in the Swiss Army along with Militärblachen with a green camo pattern (not the same pattern as the TAZ 90).

== History ==
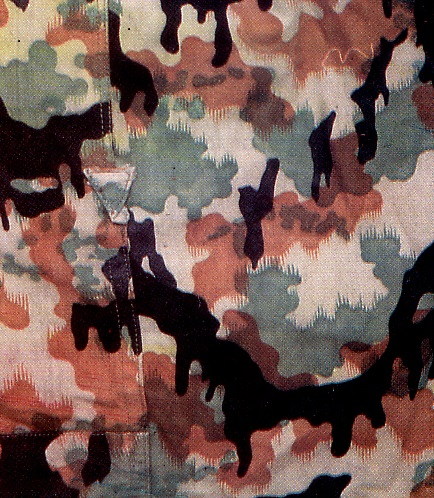
Original Wehrmacht "Leibermuster" pattern produced by Germany at the end of WWII.

The pattern is directly based on a experimental all-terrain pattern that saw limited service at the end of World War II by Germany's Waffen-SS and Wehrmacht called Leibermuster designed by Helmut Leiber brothers which was set to replace all German camouflage patters at the time. After the end of World War II, Switzerland was given the technology used to make the camouflage pattern, having reportedly obtained the original German WWII era roller-printing machines through Czechoslovakia.

The Kampfanzug 57/70 was issued from 1957 to 1993 (after 1970 with a textile daypack) and the lighter TAZ 83 with different pattern from 1983 to 1993 for non-combat troops before both were replaced by the TAZ 90.

== Pattern ==
The Kampfanzug 57/70 is a six-colour camouflage pattern consisting of a tan-coloured background with random white flecks with light green body, overprinted with green, red/reddish brown and black leaf shapes. The choice of red and green would at first glance seem to make this pattern very bright for something intended to conceal, but it works well for FIBUA (fighting in built-up areas) environments and alpine terrain.

Swiss soldiers have referred to it as "Vierfrucht-Pyjama," which translates as, "four-fruit pyjamas."

== Users ==
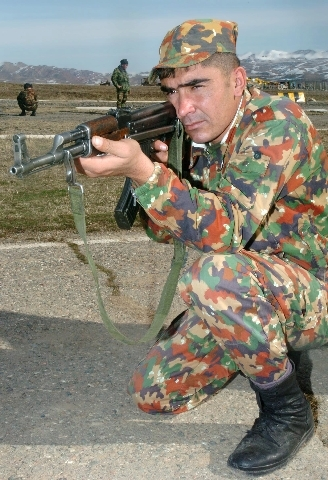
Tajik soldier with TAZ-83 uniform during joint American-Tajik exercise in 2007.

- Switzerland
- Tajikistan

=== Former users ===
- Kosova: Used by the Kosovo Liberation Army.
- Russia: never officially adopted by Russian military, however it appears that some examples were acquired by Russian VDV troops in the First Chechen War, likely via military surplus and was liked due to the M70 Jacket’s massive carrying capacity.

== See also ==
- TAZ 90
