= Pondicherry-class minesweeper =

Class of minesweepers built and operated by Indian navy

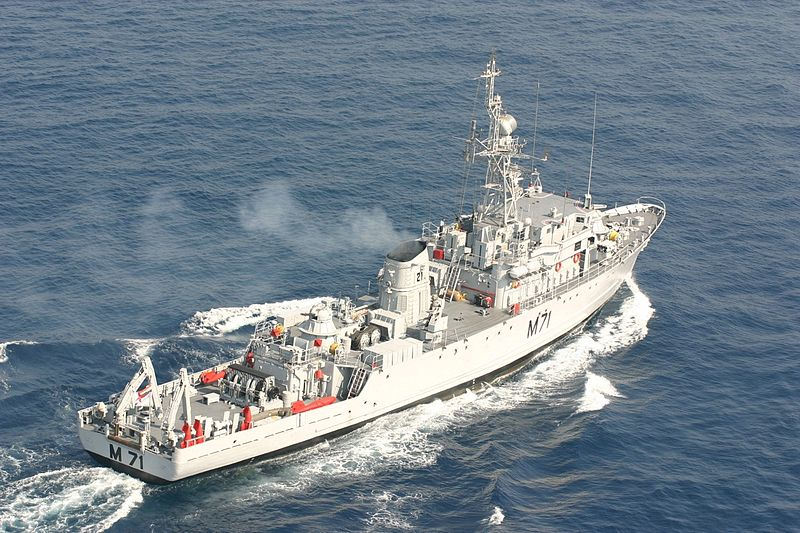
- INS Kozhikode

Class overview
- Name: Pondicherry class
- Operators: Indian Navy
- Preceded by: Mahé-class minesweeper
- Succeeded by: Future Indian minehunter class
- Subclasses: Karwar class
- In commission: 1978-2019
- Completed: 12
- Retired: 12

General characteristics
- Type: Minesweeper
- Displacement: 877 long tons (891 t) full load
- Length: 61 m (200 ft 2 in)
- Beam: 10.2 m (33 ft 6 in)
- Draft: 2.7 m (8 ft 10 in)
- Propulsion: 2 × M-503B diesels, 2 shafts, 5,000 bhp (3,700 kW)
- Speed: 16 knots (30 km/h; 18 mph)
- Range: 4,000 nmi (7,400 km) at 10 knots (19 km/h; 12 mph); 3,000 nmi (5,600 km) at 12 knots (22 km/h; 14 mph)
- Complement: 10 officers, 72 enlisted
- Sensors & processing systems: Sonar: MG-69/79 High frequency, hull mounted, active mine detection; Radar: Don 2 I-band air/surface; 2 × Square Head - High Pole B IFF; MR-104 Drum Tilt H/I-band fire control
- Electronic warfare & decoys: Minesweeping: AT-2 acoustic sweep; GKT-2 contact sweep; TEM-3 magnetic sweep
- Armament: 4 × 30 mm (2×2) guns; 4 × 25 mm (2×2) AA; 2 × RBU 1200 5-tubed ASW rocket; 10 mines; M67–M72 also have 2 × SA-N-5 SAM, 16 Grail missiles

The Pondicherry class are a class of minesweepers built for the Indian Navy by the Soviet Union. They are modified versions of the Natya-class minesweeper. The vessels were acquired in two batches. The first were purchased from 1977 to 1980 and the second from 1986 to 1988. Technically, the second batch is referred to as the Karwar class but are physically identical to the first batch with the exception of additional surface-to-air missiles. As minesweepers, they are large and heavily armed. They can serve a dual purpose as an anti-submarine warfare escort. Their hulls are constructed of U3 low magnetic signature steel.

M61–M66 were based at Mumbai formed the 19 Mine Countermeasures Squadron (MCMS) and were decommissioned by the March 2015. M67–M72 are based at Visakhapatnam and form the 21 Mine Countermeasures Squadron (MCMS).

INS Konkan suffered minor fire accident in Vizag dry dock on 4 December 2013. She was operational by January 2014. INS Kozhikode was the last ship in the series to be decommissioned on 13 April 2019.

== Ships ==
| Name | Pennant | Commissioned | Decommissioned | Status | Homeport |
|---|---|---|---|---|---|
Flight I : Pondicherry class
| Pondicherry | M 61 | 2 February 1978 | 5 October 2007 | Decommissioned | Mumbai |
| Porbander | M 62 | 19 December 1977 | Decommissioned 2007 | Decommissioned | Mumbai |
| Bedi | M 63 | 27 April 1979 | 22 September 2009 | Decommissioned | Mumbai |
| Bhavnagar | M 64 | 27 April 1979 | 26 December 2009 | Decommissioned | Mumbai |
| Alleppey | M 65 | 10 June 1980 | 13 March 2015 | Decommissioned | Mumbai |
| Ratnagiri | M 66 | 10 June 1980 | 22 May 2012 | Decommissioned | Mumbai |
Flight II : Karwar class
| Karwar | M 67 | 14 July 1986 | 9 May 2017 | Decommissioned | Visakhapatnam |
| Cannanore | M 68 | 17 December 1987 | 23 March 2018 | Decommissioned | Visakhapatnam |
| Cuddalore | M 69 | 29 October 1987 | 23 March 2018 | Decommissioned | Visakhapatnam |
| Kakinada | M 70 | 23 December 1986 | 9 May 2017 | Decommissioned | Visakhapatnam |
| Kozhikode | M 71 | 19 December 1988 | 13 April 2019 | Decommissioned | Visakhapatnam |
| Konkan | M 72 | 8 October 1988 | 23 March 2018 | Decommissioned | Visakhapatnam |

== See also ==
- List of Indian Navy ships
