= TAZ 90 =

Swiss military camouflage since 1993

TAZ90
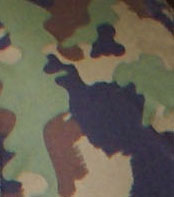
- TAZ 90 Woodland fabric
- Type: Military camouflage pattern
- Place of origin: Switzerland

Service history
- In service: 1993–present
- Used by: Switzerland

Production history
- Produced: 1993–present
- Variants: See Variants

The TAZ 90 (TarnAnZug in German and TASS 90 in French) is the camouflage patterns for current standard issue battledress and service dress uniform of the Swiss Armed Forces.

== History ==
The TAZ 90 was issued to the Swiss military in 1993 after the TAZ 83 had been phased out of service. ETH Zurich played a role in its creation, since the pattern was made to suit Swiss environment.

=== Replacement ===
The TAZ 16 ("Multiumfeldtarnmuster 16") will be introduced to the troop from 2022. The geometry of the pattern is kept as it is, but the colour pattern will be slightly modified. The black is replaced by a tan-like light brown.

The new camouflage, is currently in use since 2018, and is being fielded by Army Reconnaissance Detachment 10 and some individuals in the regular army

The new pattern will be applied to the new personal equipment of the Swiss Army that will be supplied to the new recruits. It is known as the MBAS program, and its cost is estimated to be CHF 215 million.

== Pattern ==
The four-colour pattern consists of tan, brown, green and black and is a development of the Taz 57 and Taz 83 (the "Alpenflage") patterns which it replaced in the early 1990s. Even so, the pattern is based on the alpenflage, but with the deletion of the white spots and the red colour found in the alpenflage, along with minor changes.

== Variants ==
=== Taz 90/06 ===
In 2006, the Taz was changed to include Velcro insignia and Velcro name tabs (Taz 90/06).

=== Desert ===
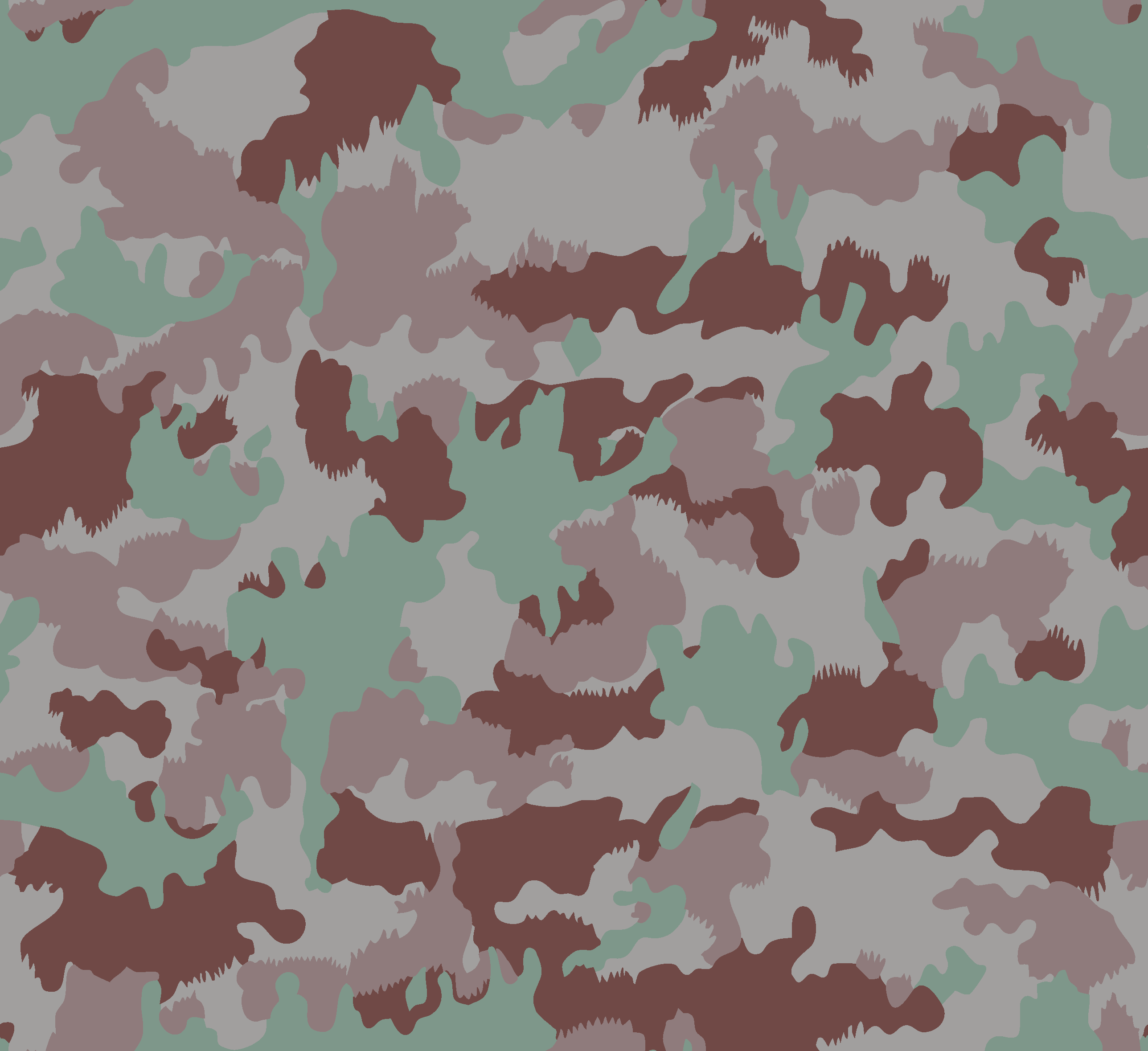
TAZ 07 swatch.

A desert variant for Swiss troops working abroad in peacekeeping operations. Known sometimes as TAZ 07, Südtarn or Wüstetarn, the variant was seen with Swiss troops in Kosovo in peacekeeping operations.

== Gallery ==
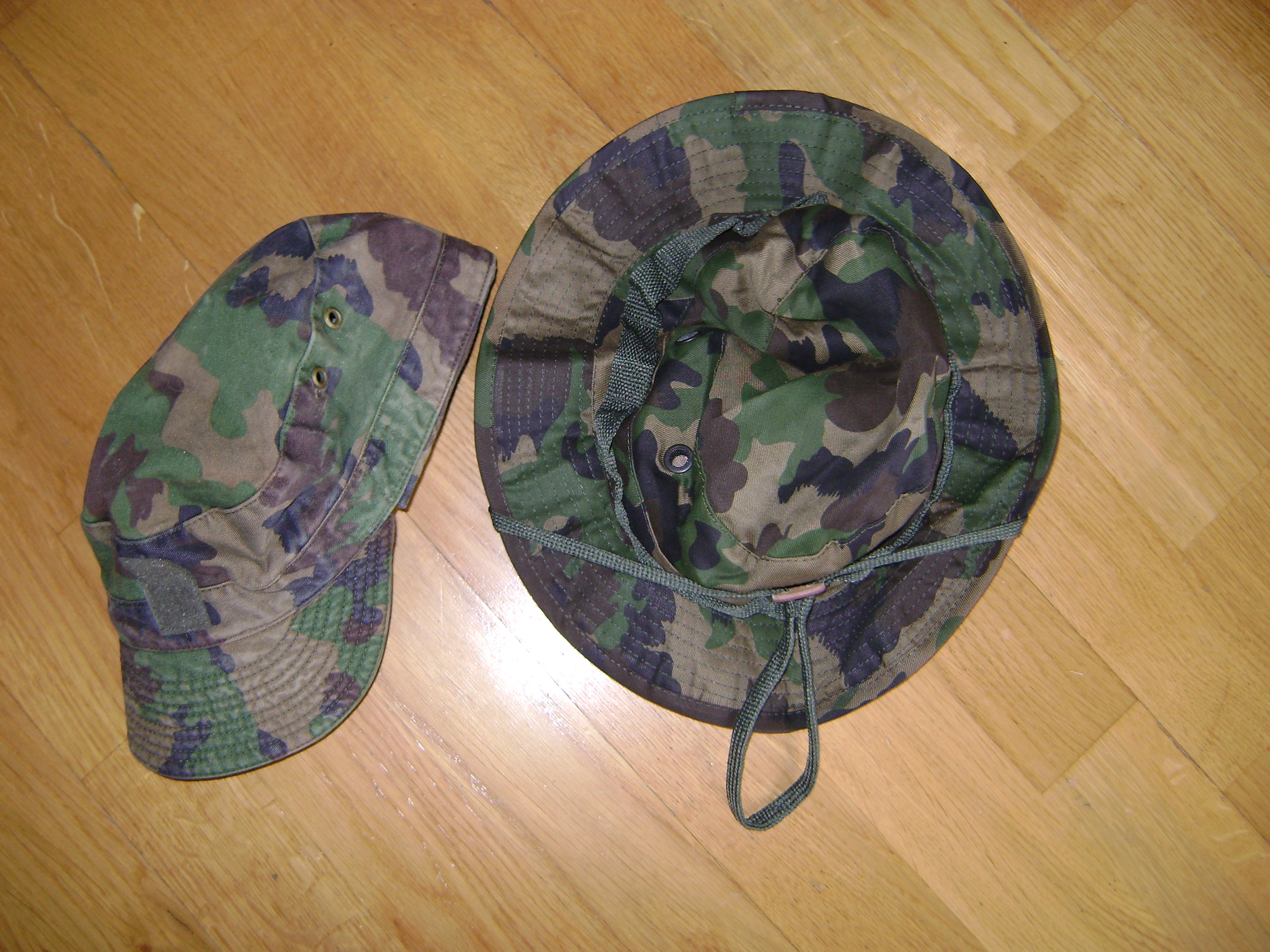
Taz 90 hat

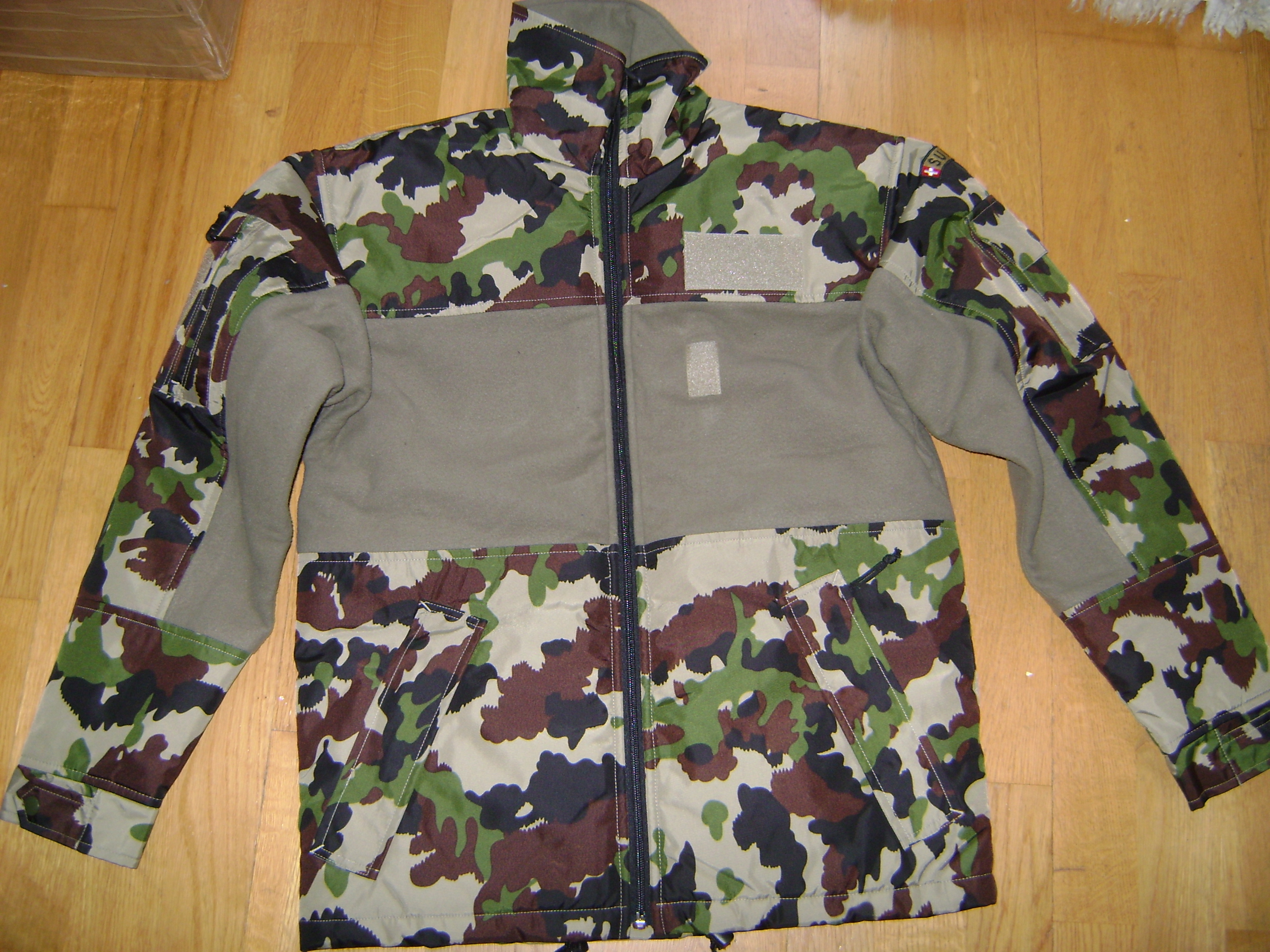
A Taz 90 instructor jacket

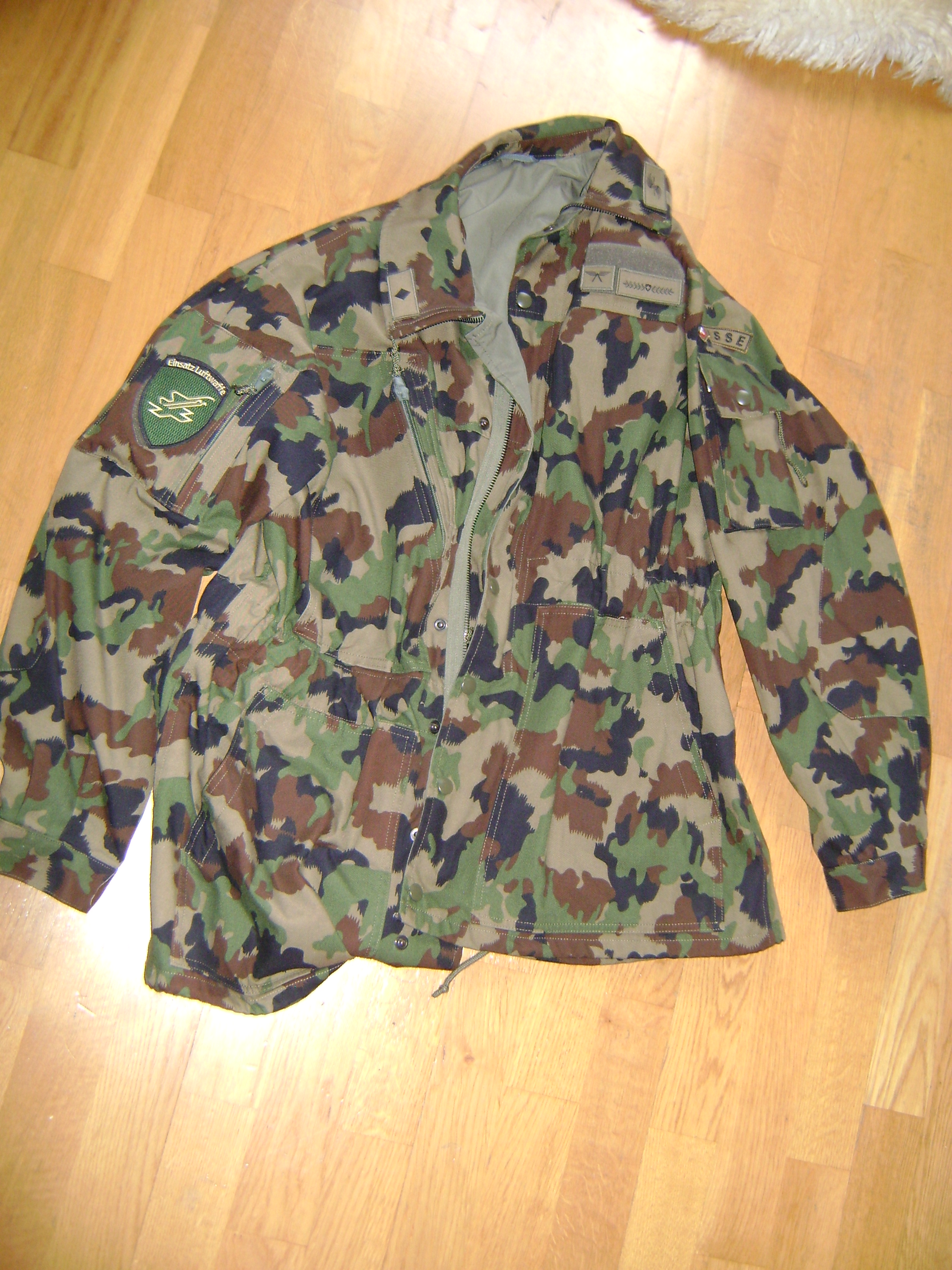
Taz 90 (Swiss Woodland) camouflage cold protection jacket

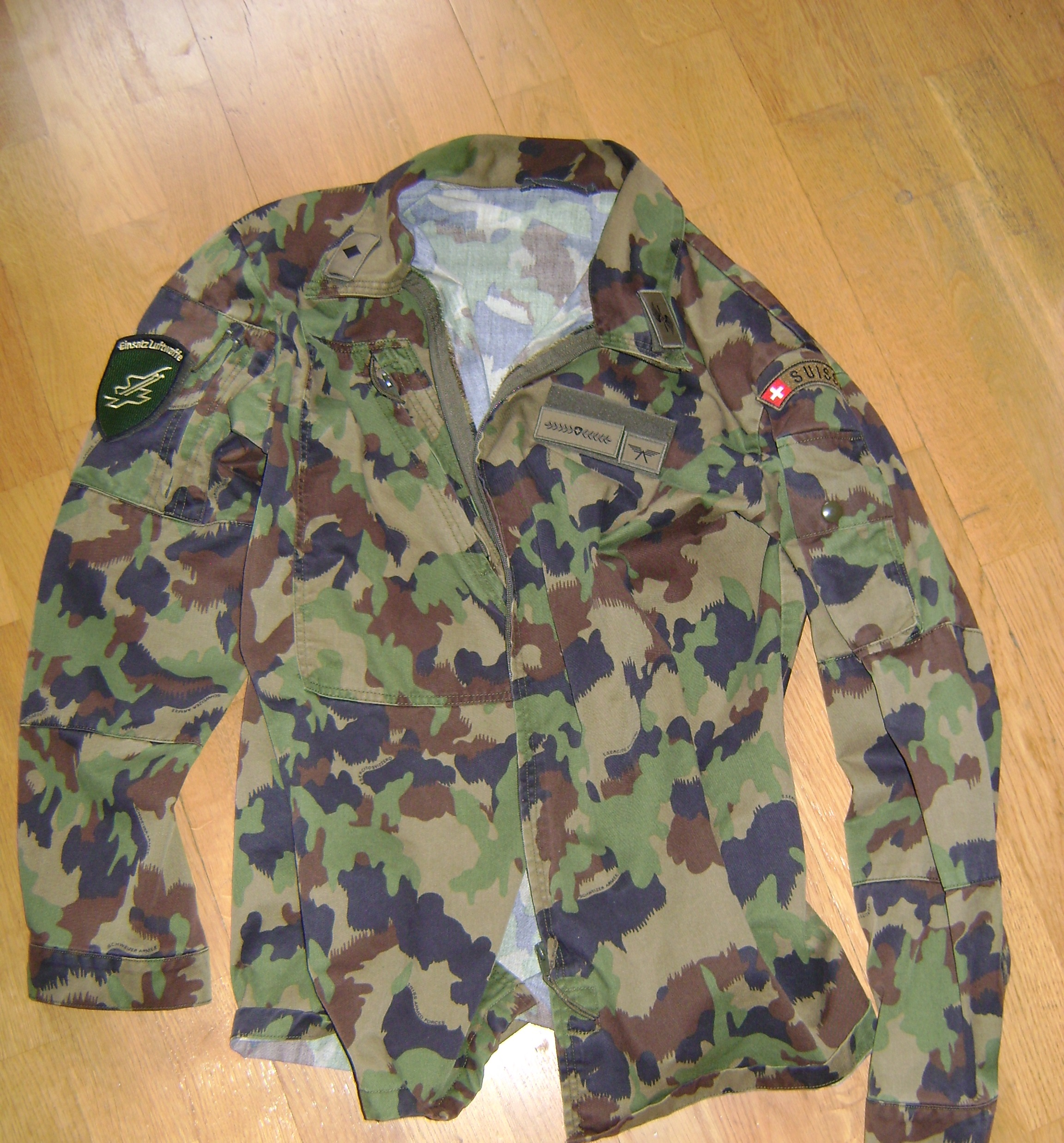
Taz 90 jacket

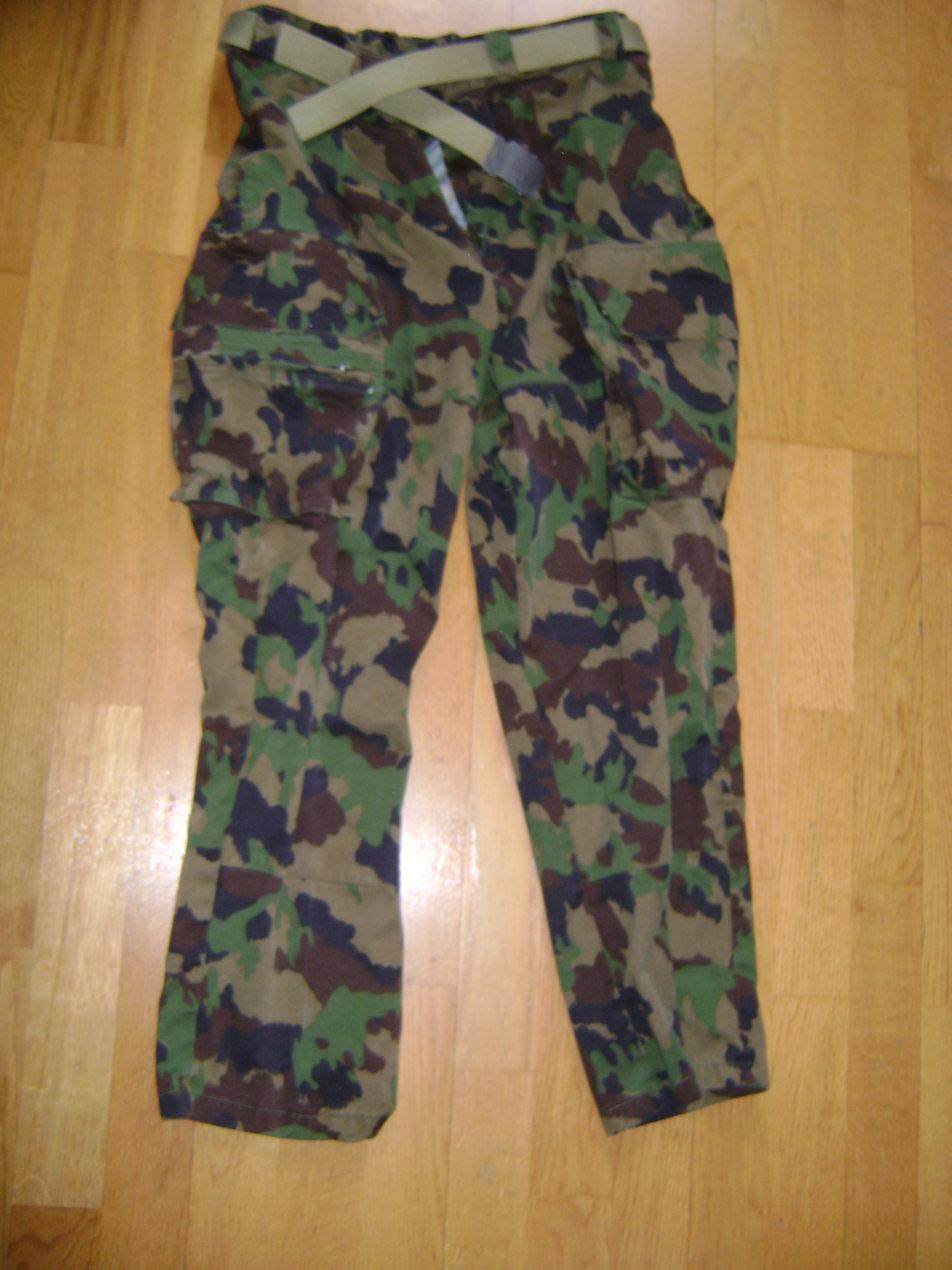
Taz 90 trousers

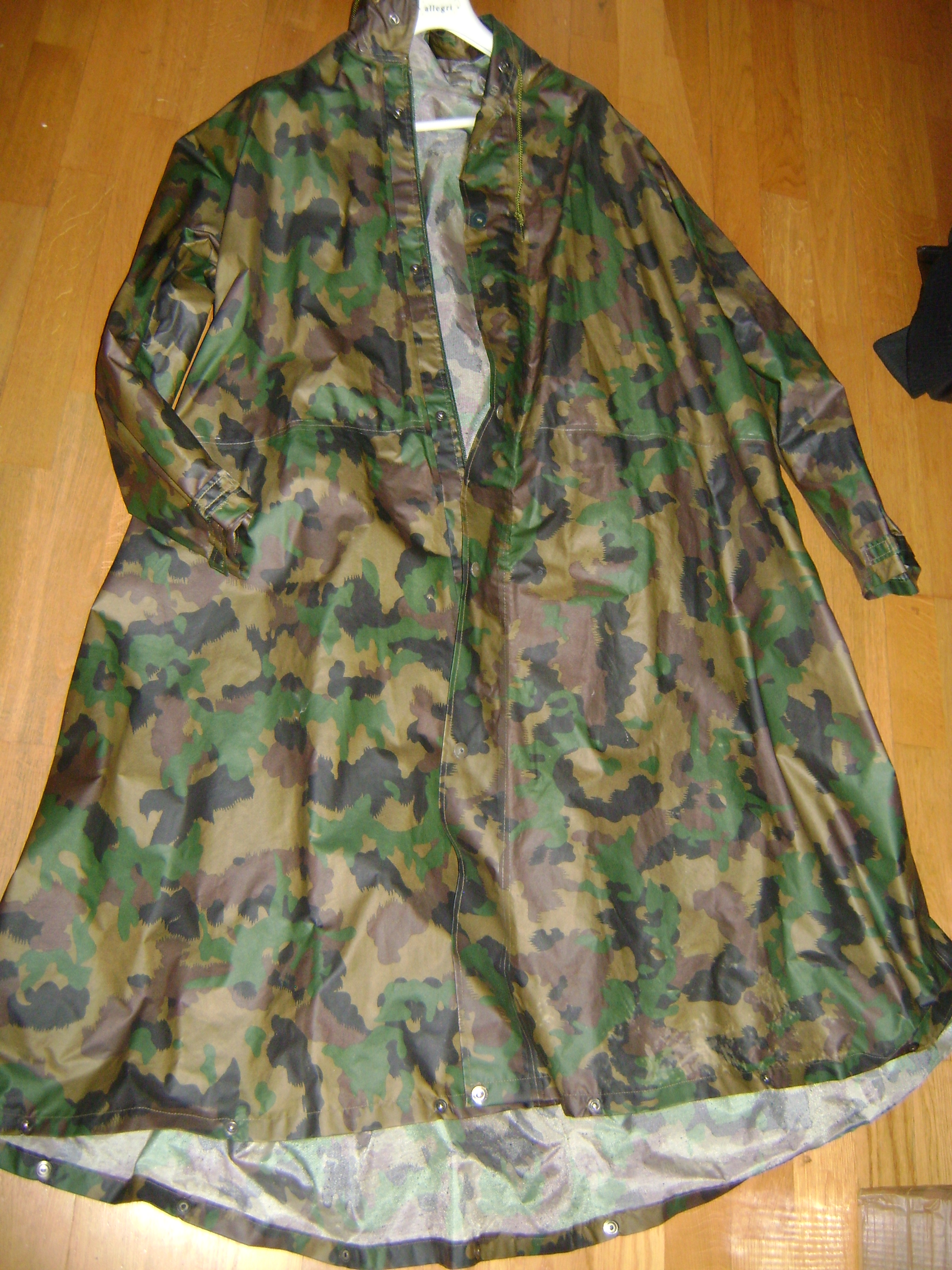
Taz 90 raincoat

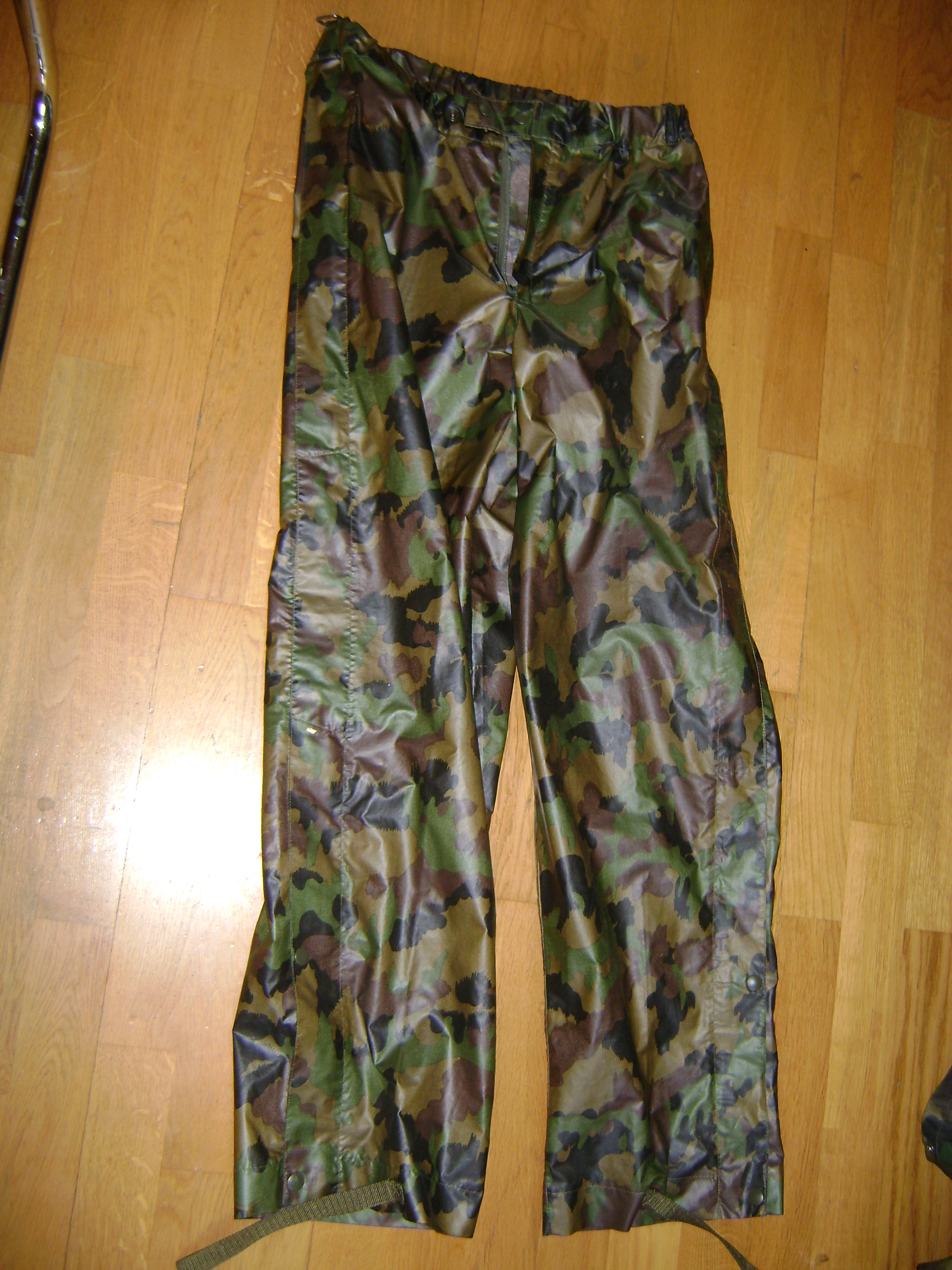
Taz 90 raintrousers

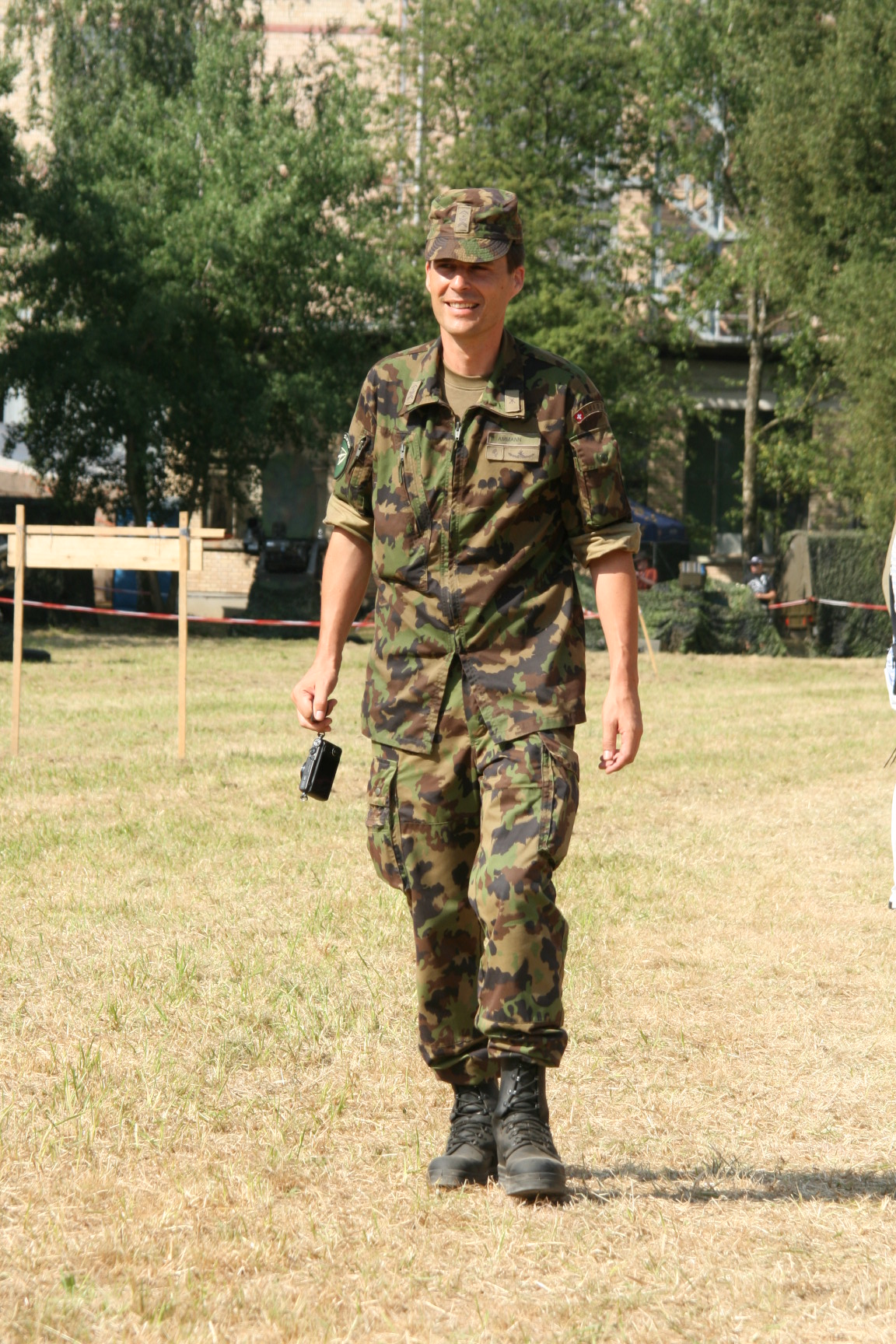
NCO with Taz 90

== Bibliography ==
- Larson, Eric H. (2021). Camouflage: International Ground Force Patterns, 1946–2017. Barnsley: Pen & Sword. ISBN 9781526739537.
