= List of frigates of India =

Frigates, which are naval vessels intermediate between corvettes and destroyers, have had a significant role in the naval history of India. Although the Maratha Navy, the naval branch of the armed forces of the Maratha Empire, used Grabs and Gallivats to project naval power, the concept of frigates (formerly called sloops) was introduced by the British. HMIS Clive, HMIS Lawrence and HMIS Cornwallis, of the Aubrietia class, were some of the early sloops commissioned into the Royal Indian Navy (RIN) during the 1920s. These ships later served in the Second World War. Later, in the 1930s, sloops of the P, Anchusa, Hastings, Grimsby, and Black Swan classes were commissioned.

The RIN was expanded significantly during the Second World War. The sloops HMIS Sutlej and HMIS Jumna, of the Black Swan class, took part in Operation Husky, the Allied invasion of Sicily. In 1945, HMIS Dhanush and HMIS Shamsher, of the River class, were the first frigates, so-called, to be commissioned. Several frigates of the River class were also commissioned. Some of them were later transferred to Pakistan during partition.

In the post-war period, the Indian Navy operated frigates from the Blackwood, Whitby, Leopard, Leander, and Nilgiri classes. The Nilgiri-class frigates were the first major warships to be built in India, in association with Yarrow Shipbuilders of the United Kingdom. Later in the 2000s, the Indian Navy, collaborating with Russia for the first time, acquired six under Project 1135.6, designated as Talwar-class. As of January 2025, 14 guided-missile frigates from four different classes – Nilgiri, Shivalik, Talwar, and Brahmaputra – are operated by the Indian Navy.

== Ships currently in commission ==
The Nilgiri-class is the largest of the frigate classes presently in service as of January 2025. INS Nilgiri is the lead ship of the class and the second class of stealth warship built by India. This class is intended to serve as a complement to the currently-serving Shivalik-class frigates with improved design portfolios, such as low radar cross-section (RCS) and reduced infrared signature. Of the seven ships ordered, four are built by Mazagon Dock Limited in Mumbai and three by Garden Reach Shipbuilders and Engineers in Kolkata.The Shivalik-class is the first stealth warship built by India. All three ships of this class were built by Mazagon Dock Limited in Mumbai, from 2000 to 2010. With their improved stealth features and land-attack capabilities, the Shivalik-class warships were originally conceived as successors to the seven Talwar-class frigates, which are modified Krivak III-class vessels built by Russia for the Indian Navy. The Talwar class was preceded by the Brahmaputra-class frigates, which were built by the Garden Reach Shipbuilders and Engineers in Kolkata. Three ships of this class are still in service with the Indian Navy.

=== Nilgiri class ===
The Nilgiri-class frigates, formally classified as the Project-17 Alpha frigates (P-17A), are a series of stealth guided-missile frigates currently being built by Mazagon Dock Shipbuilders (MDL) and Garden Reach Shipbuilders & Engineers (GRSE) for the Indian Navy (IN). Designed by the Warship Design Bureau, the class is intended to serve as a complement to the currently-serving Shivalik-class frigates (P-17) with improved design portfolios, such as low radar cross-section (RCS) and reduced infrared signature.With a total of seven vessels, the construction of the frigates are currently divided between MDL and GRSE. As of 2024, all seven frigates have been launched and are intended to enter service with the IN between 2024 and 2027. The frigates will form a part of the Eastern Fleet as well as the future Carrier Battle Group (CBG) of INS Vikrant.

Ship	Pennent number	Picture	Armament	Displacement	Service			Origin
Ship	Pennent number	Picture	Armament	Displacement	Laid down	Launched	Commissioned	Origin
INS Nilgiri	F33		2 x 16 cell VLS-launched Barak 8 surface-to-air missiles; 8 × VLS-launched BrahMos, anti-ship cruise missiles; 1 × OTO Melara 76 mm gun; 2 × AK-630 CIWS; 2 × OFT 12.7 mm M2 Stabilized Remote Controlled Gun; 2 × Triple torpedo tubes for Torpedo Advanced Light Shyena; 2 × RBU-6000 (RPK-8) rocket launchers	6,670 tonnes (6,560 long tons; 7,350 short tons) full load	28 December 2017	28 September 2019	15 January 2025	India (MDL)
INS Udaygiri	F35		2 x 16 cell VLS-launched Barak 8 surface-to-air missiles; 8 × VLS-launched BrahMos, anti-ship cruise missiles; 1 × OTO Melara 76 mm gun; 2 × AK-630 CIWS; 2 × OFT 12.7 mm M2 Stabilized Remote Controlled Gun; 2 × Triple torpedo tubes for Torpedo Advanced Light Shyena; 2 × RBU-6000 (RPK-8) rocket launchers	6,670 tonnes (6,560 long tons; 7,350 short tons) full load	7 May 2019	17 May 2022	26 August 2025	India (MDL)
INS Taragiri	F41		2 x 16 cell VLS-launched Barak 8 surface-to-air missiles; 8 × VLS-launched BrahMos, anti-ship cruise missiles; 1 × OTO Melara 76 mm gun; 2 × AK-630 CIWS; 2 × OFT 12.7 mm M2 Stabilized Remote Controlled Gun; 2 × Triple torpedo tubes for Torpedo Advanced Light Shyena; 2 × RBU-6000 (RPK-8) rocket launchers	6,670 tonnes (6,560 long tons; 7,350 short tons) full load	10 September 2020	11 September 2022	3 April 2026	India (MDL)
INS Himgiri	F34		2 x 16 cell VLS-launched Barak 8 surface-to-air missiles; 8 × VLS-launched BrahMos, anti-ship cruise missiles; 1 × OTO Melara 76 mm gun; 2 × AK-630 CIWS; 2 × OFT 12.7 mm M2 Stabilized Remote Controlled Gun; 2 × Triple torpedo tubes for Torpedo Advanced Light Shyena; 2 × RBU-6000 (RPK-8) rocket launchers	6,670 tonnes (6,560 long tons; 7,350 short tons) full load	10 November 2018	14 December 2020	26 August 2025	India(GRSE)

=== Shivalik class ===
The Shivalik class, or Project 17 class, is a class of multi-role frigates in service with the Indian Navy. They are the first stealth warships built in India. A total of three ships were built between 2000 and 2010, and all three were in commission by 2012. The Shivalik class, along with the seven Project 17A frigates being developed from them as of February 2017, are projected to be the principal frigates of the Indian Navy in the first half of the 21st century. All ships of the class were built by Mazagon Dock Limited. The class and the ships are named after hill ranges in India. Originally conceived as a successor to the Talwar-class frigates, the Shivalik-class frigates feature improved stealth features and land-attack capabilities.

Ship	Pennent number	Picture	Armament	Displacement	Service			Origin
Ship	Pennent number	Picture	Armament	Displacement	Laid down	Launched	Commissioned	Origin
INS Shivalik	F47		2 x 16 cell VLS-launched Barak 1 surface-to-air missiles; 24 × Shtil-1 medium-range missiles; 8 × VLS-launched Klub, anti-ship cruise missiles or BrahMos; 1 × OTO Melara 76 mm gun; 2 × AK-630 CIWS; 2 × 2 DTA-53-956 torpedo launchers; 2 × RBU-6000 (RPK-8) rocket launchers	6,200 tonnes (6,100 long tons; 6,800 short tons) full load	11 July 2001	18 April 2003	29 April 2010	India(MDL)
INS Satpura	F48		2 x 16 cell VLS-launched Barak 1 surface-to-air missiles; 24 × Shtil-1 medium-range missiles; 8 × VLS-launched Klub, anti-ship cruise missiles or BrahMos; 1 × OTO Melara 76 mm gun; 2 × AK-630 CIWS; 2 × 2 DTA-53-956 torpedo launchers; 2 × RBU-6000 (RPK-8) rocket launchers	6,200 tonnes (6,100 long tons; 6,800 short tons) full load	31 October 2002	4 June 2004	20 August 2011	India(MDL)
INS Sahyadri	F49		2 x 16 cell VLS-launched Barak 1 surface-to-air missiles; 24 × Shtil-1 medium-range missiles; 8 × VLS-launched Klub, anti-ship cruise missiles or BrahMos; 1 × OTO Melara 76 mm gun; 2 × AK-630 CIWS; 2 × 2 DTA-53-956 torpedo launchers; 2 × RBU-6000 (RPK-8) rocket launchers	6,200 tonnes (6,100 long tons; 6,800 short tons) full load	30 September 2003	27 May 2005	21 July 2012	India(MDL)

=== Talwar class ===
The Talwar class, also known as Project 1135.6, is a class of guided-missile frigates designed and built by Russia for the Indian Navy, as modified Krivak III-class frigates (the class that is also the basis of the Russian Admiral Grigorovich-class frigate), with a number of systems of Indian design and manufacture, including anti-submarine sensors (sonar) and communications equipment. Each ship of this class has a displacement of 4,000 tons and speed of 30 knots (56 km/h; 35 mph) and is capable of accomplishing a wide variety of missions, primarily finding and eliminating enemy submarines and large surface ships. Due to the use of stealth technologies and a special hull design, the frigate operates with reduced radar cross section (RCS), as well as reduced electromagnetic, acoustic, and infrared signatures.

Ship	Pennent number	Picture	Armament	Displacement	Service			Origin
Ship	Pennent number	Picture	Armament	Displacement	Laid down	Launched	Commissioned	Origin
INS Talwar	F40		24 × Shtil-1 medium-range missiles; 8 × Igla-1E (SA-16); 8 × VLS launched Klub, anti-ship cruise missiles; 1 × 100 mm (3.9 in) A-190E gun; 2 × Kashtan CIWS; 2 × 2 533 mm (21.0 in) torpedo tubes; 1 × RBU-6000 (RPK-8) rocket launcher	4,035 tonnes (3,971 long tons; 4,448 short tons)	10 March 1999	12 May 2000	18 June 2003	Russia(Baltic Shipyard)
INS Trishul	F43		24 × Shtil-1 medium-range missiles; 8 × Igla-1E (SA-16); 8 × VLS launched Klub, anti-ship cruise missiles; 1 × 100 mm (3.9 in) A-190E gun; 2 × Kashtan CIWS; 2 × 2 533 mm (21.0 in) torpedo tubes; 1 × RBU-6000 (RPK-8) rocket launcher	4,035 tonnes (3,971 long tons; 4,448 short tons)	24 September 1999	24 November 2000	25 June 2003	Russia(Baltic Shipyard)
INS Tabar (F44)	F44		24 × Shtil-1 medium-range missiles; 8 × Igla-1E (SA-16); 8 × VLS launched Klub, anti-ship cruise missiles; 1 × 100 mm (3.9 in) A-190E gun; 2 × Kashtan CIWS; 2 × 2 533 mm (21.0 in) torpedo tubes; 1 × RBU-6000 (RPK-8) rocket launcher	4,035 tonnes (3,971 long tons; 4,448 short tons)	26 May 2000	25 May 2001	19 April 2004	Russia(Baltic Shipyard)
INS Teg	F45		24 × Shtil-1 medium-range missiles; 8 × Igla-1E (SA-16); 8 × VLS launched BrahMos, anti-ship and land-attack cruise missiles (F45, F50, F51); 1 × 100 mm (3.9 in) A-190E gun; 2 × AK-630 CIWS; 2 × 2 533 mm (21.0 in) torpedo tubes; 1 × RBU-6000 (RPK-8) rocket launcher	4,035 tonnes (3,971 long tons; 4,448 short tons)	c.July 2007	27 November 2009	27 April 2012	Russia (Yantar Shipyard)
INS Tarkash	F50		24 × Shtil-1 medium-range missiles; 8 × Igla-1E (SA-16); 8 × VLS launched BrahMos, anti-ship and land-attack cruise missiles (F45, F50, F51); 1 × 100 mm (3.9 in) A-190E gun; 2 × AK-630 CIWS; 2 × 2 533 mm (21.0 in) torpedo tubes; 1 × RBU-6000 (RPK-8) rocket launcher	4,035 tonnes (3,971 long tons; 4,448 short tons)	c.November 2007	23 June 2010	9 November 2012	Russia (Yantar Shipyard)
INS Trikand	F51		24 × Shtil-1 medium-range missiles; 8 × Igla-1E (SA-16); 8 × VLS launched BrahMos, anti-ship and land-attack cruise missiles (F45, F50, F51); 1 × 100 mm (3.9 in) A-190E gun; 2 × AK-630 CIWS; 2 × 2 533 mm (21.0 in) torpedo tubes; 1 × RBU-6000 (RPK-8) rocket launcher	4,035 tonnes (3,971 long tons; 4,448 short tons)	11 June 2008	25 May 2011	29 June 2013	Russia (Yantar Shipyard)
INS Tushil	F70		24 × VLS launched Shtil-1 medium-range missiles; 8 × Igla-1E (SA-16); 8 × VLS launched BrahMos, anti-ship and land-attack cruise missiles; 1 × 100 mm (3.9 in) A-190E gun; 2 × AK-630 CIWS; 2 × 2 533 mm (21.0 in) torpedo tubes; 1 × RBU-6000 (RPK-8) rocket launcher	4,035 tonnes (3,971 long tons; 4,448 short tons)	13 July 2013 (ex-Butakov)	28 October 2021	9 December 2024	Russia (Yantar Shipyard)
INS Tamal	F71		24 × VLS launched Shtil-1 medium-range missiles; 8 × Igla-1E (SA-16); 8 × VLS launched BrahMos, anti-ship and land-attack cruise missiles; 1 × 100 mm (3.9 in) A-190E gun; 2 × AK-630 CIWS; 2 × 2 533 mm (21.0 in) torpedo tubes; 1 × RBU-6000 (RPK-8) rocket launcher	4,035 tonnes (3,971 long tons; 4,448 short tons)	5 November 2013 (ex-Istomin)	24 February 2022	1 July 2025	Russia (Yantar Shipyard)

=== Brahmaputra class ===
The Brahmaputra-class frigates (Type 16A or Project 16A) are guided-missile frigates of the Indian Navy, designed and built in India. They are an enhancement of the Godavari class, with the same displacement, 3850 tons, and length, 126 metres (413 ft), but with different configuration, armaments, and capabilities. Three ships of this class serve in the Indian Navy. The class and the ships, are named for Indian rivers.

Ship	Pennent number	Picture	Armament	Displacement	Laid down	Launched	Commissioned	Origin
INS Brahmaputra	F31		16 × Kh-35 (SS-N-25) SSM (4 × quadruple KT-184 launchers); 24 × Barak SAM (3 × 8-cell VLS units); 1 × OTO Melara 76 mm gun; 4 × AK-630 6-barreled 30 mm (1.2 in) gatling gun; 2 × triple ILAS 3 324 mm (12.8 in) torpedo tubes (Whitehead A244S anti-submarine torpedoes)	3,850 tonnes (3,790 long tons; 4,240 short tons)	c.1989	26 January 1994	14 April 2000	India(GRSE)
INS Betwa	F39		16 × Kh-35 (SS-N-25) SSM (4 × quadruple KT-184 launchers); 24 × Barak SAM (3 × 8-cell VLS units); 1 × OTO Melara 76 mm gun; 4 × AK-630 6-barreled 30 mm (1.2 in) gatling gun; 2 × triple ILAS 3 324 mm (12.8 in) torpedo tubes (Whitehead A244S anti-submarine torpedoes)	3,850 tonnes (3,790 long tons; 4,240 short tons)	22 August 1994	26 February 1998	7 July 2004	India(GRSE)
INS Beas	F37		16 × Kh-35 (SS-N-25) SSM (4 × quadruple KT-184 launchers); 24 × Barak SAM (3 × 8-cell VLS units); 1 × OTO Melara 76 mm gun; 4 × AK-630 6-barreled 30 mm (1.2 in) gatling gun; 2 × triple ILAS 3 324 mm (12.8 in) torpedo tubes (Whitehead A244S anti-submarine torpedoes)	3,850 tonnes (3,790 long tons; 4,240 short tons)	26 February 1998	28 November 2000	11 July 2005	India(GRSE)

== Decommissioned ships ==
Most of the decommissioned frigates or sloops of the Indian Navy originated in the United Kingdom.

=== Sloops ===
A modern British sloop-of-war is a warship used for convoy defence. HMIS Clive,HMIS Lawrence of the Aubrietia class, were some of the early sloops commissioned into the RIN during the 1920s. These ships were also the first ships to be decommissioned. Later, sloops from the Black Swan, Grimsby, P, Hastings, and Anchusa classes were commissioned. The sloops HMIS Narbada and HMIS Godavari, of the Black Swan class, and HMIS Hindustan, of the Hastings class, were transferred to Pakistan post-partition. HMIS Elphinstone, of the Anchusa class, and HMIS Indus, of the Grimsby class, were lost in action during the Second World War. The other sloops were subsequently scrapped after their decommissioning.

==== Anchusa class ====
The twenty-eight Anchusa-class sloops were a small class of corvettes or convoy sloops built in 1917 and 1918 under the Emergency War Programme for the Royal Navy in the First World War, as the final part of the larger "Flower class" (which were also referred to as the "cabbage class", or "herbaceous borders"). The sloops were single-screw with triple hulls at the bows to give extra protection against loss when working as fleet sweeping vessels, or as convoy protection ships (the class was built to look like merchant ships for use as Q-ships). HMS Ceanothus (1917) (later renamed as HMS Elphinstone), transferred to the Royal Indian Marine in 1922, was the only Anchusa-class sloop used by India.

Ship	Armament	Displacement	Service			Origin	Fate
Ship	Armament	Displacement	Commissioned (Royal Navy)	Commissioned (Royal Indian Marine)	Decommissioned	Origin	Fate
HMIS Elphinstone	2 × 12-pounder gun; 1 × 7.5 inch howitzer or 1 × 200 lb stick-bomb howitzer; 4 × Depth charge throwers; 2 × 4 in (102 mm) guns; 1 or 2 × 12-pounder guns	1,290 tonnes (1,270 long tons; 1,420 short tons)	2 June 1917	May 1922	-	United Kingdom	Wrecked on the Nicobar Islands on 29 January 1925.

==== Aubrietia class ====
The Aubrietia class was a class of twelve sloops built under the Emergency War Programme for the Royal Navy in the First World War as part of the larger "Flower" class. The Flowers were the first ships designed as minesweepers. Like all the Flowers, the Aubrietia class were originally designed as single-screw fleet sweeping vessels, with triple hulls at the bows and an above-water magazine located aft, to give extra protection against loss from mine damage when working. However, the greatest utility was to be as a convoy escort; and, as such, other classes took over the minesweeping role. The Aubrietias were re-classified as convoy sloops. HMIS Cornwallis of this class was used by the RIN from 1921 to 1946, when it was decommissioned.

Ship	Armament	Displacement	Service			Origin	Fate
Ship	Armament	Displacement	Commissioned (Royal Navy)	Commissioned (Royal Indian Marine)	Decommissioned	Origin	Fate
HMIS Cornwallis (U09) (Note: Formerly HMS Lychnis (L09).)	2 × 4-inch 102 mm (4.0 in) gun; 1 × 3-pounder 47 mm (1.9 in) AA; depth charge throwers	1,250 tonnes (1,230 long tons; 1,380 short tons)	21 August 1917	September 1921	1946	United Kingdom	scrapped

==== P class ====
The P class, nominally classified as "patrol boats", was in effect a class of coastal sloops. Twenty-four ships to this design were ordered in May 1915 (numbered P.11 to P.34), and another thirty between February and June 1916 (numbered P.35 to P.64), under the Emergency War Programme for the Royal Navy in the First World War. In December 1916, ten of the latter group were altered on the stocks before launch for use as decoy Q-ships and were renumbered as PC-class sloops. Although usually not named, in 1925 P.38 was given the name Spey, as well as HMIS Baluchi and HMIS Pathan, the two P-class sloops used by the RIN.

Ship	Armament	Displacement	Service			Origin	Fate
Ship	Armament	Displacement	Commissioned (Royal Navy)	Commissioned (RIN)	Decommissioned	Origin	Fate
HMIS Baluchi (PC.55)	1 × 4-inch 102 mm (4.0 in); 1 × QF 2-pounder 40 mm (1.6 in) A/A; 2 × 14-inch torpedo tubes	613 tonnes (603 long tons; 676 short tons)	5 May 1917	May 1922	1935	United Kingdom	Sold for scrapping.
HMIS Pathan (PC.69)	1 × 4-inch 102 mm (4.0 in); 1 × QF 2-pounder 40 mm (1.6 in) A/A; 2 × 14-inch torpedo tubes	613 tonnes (603 long tons; 676 short tons)	11 March 1918	5 August 1921	-	United Kingdom	Sunk by Italian submarine Galvani on 23 June 1940.

==== Grimsby class ====
The Grimsby class was a class of 13 sloops-of-war laid down between 1933 and 1940. Eight were built in the United Kingdom for the Royal Navy, four in Australia for the Royal Australian Navy, and one, HMIS Indus, for the RIN.

Ship	Picture	Armament	Displacement	Service			Origin	Fate
Ship	Picture	Armament	Displacement	Laid down	Commissioned (RIN)	Decommissioned	Origin	Fate
HMIS Indus (U67)		2 × 120 mm (4.7 in) Mark IX guns; 1 × QF 3 inch 20 cwt anti-aircraft gun; 4 × 3-pounder guns; 15–90 depth charges	1,006 tonnes (990 long tons; 1,109 short tons)	8 December 1933	15 March 1935	-	United Kingdom	Bombed and sunk by Japanese aircraft during the Burma Campaign on 6 April 1942.

==== Black Swan class ====
The Black Swan and Modified Black Swan were two classes of sloops of the Royal Navy and RIN. Twelve Black Swans were launched between 1939 and 1943, including four for the RIN. Twenty-five Modified Black Swans were launched between 1942 and 1945, including two for the RIN. Several other ships were cancelled.

Ship	Armament	Displacement	Service			Origin	Fate
Ship	Armament	Displacement	Laid down	Commissioned (RIN)	Decommissioned	Origin	Fate
HMIS Cauvery (Note: Renamed as INS Kaveri post republic.)	6 × QF 4 in (102 mm) Mk XVI AA guns (3 × 2); 4 × 2-pounder AA pom-pom; 4 × 0.5-inch (12.7 mm) AA machine guns (original); 12 × 20 mm (0.79 in) Oerlikon AA (6 × 2) (modified); Depth charges 40 (110 modified)	1,350 tonnes (1,330 long tons; 1,490 short tons) (Note: Original: 1,250 tonnes (1,230 long tons; 1,380 short tons))	28 October 1942	26 August 1943	30 September 1977	United Kingdom	scrapped
HMIS Jumna (Note: Renamed as INS Jamuna post republic.)	6 × QF 4 in (102 mm) Mk XVI AA guns (3 × 2); 4 × 2-pounder AA pom-pom; 4 × 0.5-inch (12.7 mm) AA machine guns (original); 12 × 20 mm (0.79 in) Oerlikon AA (6 × 2) (modified); Depth charges 40 (110 modified)	1,350 tonnes (1,330 long tons; 1,490 short tons)	20 February 1940	13 May 1941	31 December 1980	United Kingdom	scrapped
HMIS Narbada	6 × QF 4 in (102 mm) Mk XVI AA guns (3 × 2); 4 × 2-pounder AA pom-pom; 4 × 0.5-inch (12.7 mm) AA machine guns (original); 12 × 20 mm (0.79 in) Oerlikon AA (6 × 2) (modified); Depth charges 40 (110 modified)	1,350 tonnes (1,330 long tons; 1,490 short tons)	30 August 1941	29 April 1943	1948	United Kingdom	Transferred to Pakistan post-partition and served as PNS Jhelum.
HMIS Kistna (Note: Renamed as INS Krisna post republic.)	6 × QF 4 in (102 mm) Mk XVI AA guns (3 × 2); 4 × 2-pounder AA pom-pom; 4 × 0.5-inch (12.7 mm) AA machine guns (original); 12 × 20 mm (0.79 in) Oerlikon AA (6 × 2) (modified); Depth charges 40 (110 modified)	1,350 tonnes (1,330 long tons; 1,490 short tons)	14 July 1942	26 August 1943	31 December 1981	United Kingdom	scrapped
HMIS Godavari	6 × QF 4 in (102 mm) Mk XVI AA guns (3 × 2); 4 × 2-pounder AA pom-pom; 4 × 0.5-inch (12.7 mm) AA machine guns (original); 12 × 20 mm (0.79 in) Oerlikon AA (6 × 2) (modified); Depth charges 40 (110 modified)	1,350 tonnes (1,330 long tons; 1,490 short tons)	30 August 1941	28 June 1943	1948	United Kingdom	Transferred to Pakistan post-partition and served as PNS Sind.
HMIS Sutlej (Note: Renamed as INS Sutlej post republic.)	6 × QF 4 in (102 mm) Mk XVI AA guns (3 × 2); 4 × 2-pounder AA pom-pom; 4 × 0.5-inch (12.7 mm) AA machine guns (original); 12 × 20 mm (0.79 in) Oerlikon AA (6 × 2) (modified); Depth charges 40 (110 modified)	1,350 tonnes (1,330 long tons; 1,490 short tons)	4 January 1940	23 April 1941	31 December 1978	United Kingdom	scrapped

==== Hastings class ====
The Hastings class, also known as Folkestone class, was a class of five sloops built for the Royal Navy and the RIN in the interwar period, which went on to see service in the Second World War. HMIS Hindustan of this class served in the RIN.

Ship	Picture	Armament	Displacement	Service			Origin	Fate
Ship	Picture	Armament	Displacement	Laid down	Commissioned (RIN)	Decommissioned	Origin	Fate
HMIS Hindustan (L80)		2 × 4 in (100 mm) QF Mk IV guns; 4 × 3-pounder 47 mm (1.9 in) saluting guns	1,210 tonnes (1,190 long tons; 1,330 short tons)	4 September 1929	10 October 1930	1948	United Kingdom	Transferred to Pakistan post-partition and served as PNS Karsaz till 1960.

==== Other sloops ====
Ship	Armament	Displacement	Service		Origin	Fate
Ship	Armament	Displacement	Commissioned (Royal Indian Marine)	Decommissioned	Origin	Fate
HMIS Clive (U79} (Note: Previously L79.)	2 × 4 in (100 mm) guns; 2 × 2-pounder pom-poms	2,083 tonnes (2,050 long tons; 2,296 short tons)	20 April 1920	1947	United Kingdom	scrapped
HMIS Lawrence (U83) (Note: Previously L83.)	2 × 4 in (100 mm) guns; 2 × 2-pounder pom-poms	1,245 tonnes (1,225 long tons; 1,372 short tons)	27 December 1919	1947	United Kingdom	scrapped

=== Frigates ===
In 1945, HMIS Dhanush and HMIS Shamsher of the River class were the first frigates commissioned into the RIN. They were later transferred to Pakistan during partition. Later, several more frigates of the River class were commissioned. Frigates of the Blackwood, Whitby, Leopard, Nilgiri, Leander, and Godavari classes served with the Indian Navy. Of these, the Nilgiri-class frigates, commissioned between 1972 and 1981, were the first home-grown frigates in Indian service. The last ship of the Nilgiri class, INS Taragiri, was decommissioned in 2013.

==== River class ====
The River class was a class of 151 frigates launched between 1941 and 1944 for use as anti-submarine convoy escorts in the North Atlantic. The majority served with the Royal Navy (RN) and Royal Canadian Navy (RCN), with some serving in other Allied navies: the Royal Australian Navy (RAN), the Free French Navy (FFN), the Royal Netherlands Navy and, post-war, the South African Navy (SAN). Eight ships of this class served in the RIN.

Ship	Armament	Displacement	Service			Origin	Fate
Ship	Armament	Displacement	Commissioned (Royal Navy)	Commissioned (RIN)	Decommissioned	Origin	Fate
HMIS Neza (K239) (Note: Formerly HMS Test.)	4 × QF 4-inch (101.6 mm) Mk.XVI guns, twin mounts HA/LA Mk.XIX; 3 × QF 40 mm (1.6 in) Bofors, single mounts Mk.VII; 4 × QF 20 mm (0.79 in) Oerlikon, twin mounts Mk.V; 1 × Hedgehog 24 spigot A/S projector; 50 depth charges	1,390 tonnes (1,370 long tons; 1,530 short tons)	7 May 1943	1946	1947	United Kingdom	Returned to the Royal Navy in April 1947. Scrapped in 1955.
HMIS Kukri (K243) (Note: Formerly HMS Trent. Renamed INS Kukri post republic.)	4 × QF 4-inch (101.6 mm) Mk.XVI guns, twin mounts HA/LA Mk.XIX; 3 × QF 40 mm (1.6 in) Bofors, single mounts Mk.VII; 4 × QF 20 mm (0.79 in) Oerlikon, twin mounts Mk.V; 1 × Hedgehog 24 spigot A/S projector; 50 depth charges	1,390 tonnes (1,370 long tons; 1,530 short tons)	27 February 1943	1946	1951	United Kingdom	Converted to survey vessel and recommissioned as INS Investigator post republic.
HMIS Tir (K256) (Note: Formerly HMS Bann. Renamed INS Tir post republic.)	4 × QF 4-inch (101.6 mm) Mk.XVI guns, twin mounts HA/LA Mk.XIX; 3 × QF 40 mm (1.6 in) Bofors, single mounts Mk.VII; 4 × QF 20 mm (0.79 in) Oerlikon, twin mounts Mk.V; 1 × Hedgehog 24 spigot A/S projector; 50 depth charges	1,390 tonnes (1,370 long tons; 1,530 short tons)	7 May 1943	3 December 1945	30 September 1977	United Kingdom	scrapped
HMIS Tamar (K262) (Note: Formerly HMS Aire.)	4 × QF 4-inch (101.6 mm) Mk.XVI guns, twin mounts HA/LA Mk.XIX; 3 × QF 40 mm (1.6 in) Bofors, single mounts Mk.VII; 4 × QF 20 mm (0.79 in) Oerlikon, twin mounts Mk.V; 1 × Hedgehog 24 spigot A/S projector; 50 depth charges	1,390 tonnes (1,370 long tons; 1,530 short tons)	28 July 1943	1946	December 1946	United Kingdom	Constructive total Loss after running aground off Hainan Island.
HMIS Dhanush (K265) (Note: Formerly HMS Deveron.)	4 × QF 4-inch (101.6 mm) Mk.XVI guns, twin mounts HA/LA Mk.XIX; 3 × QF 40 mm (1.6 in) Bofors, single mounts Mk.VII; 4 × QF 20 mm (0.79 in) Oerlikon, twin mounts Mk.V; 1 × Hedgehog 24 spigot A/S projector; 50 depth charges	1,390 tonnes (1,370 long tons; 1,530 short tons)	2 March 1943	1945	1948	United Kingdom	Transferred to Pakistan and served as PNS Zulfiqar.
HMIS Hooghly (K330) (Note: Formerly HMCS Waskesiu. Renamed INS Hooghly post republic.)	4 × QF 4-inch (101.6 mm) Mk.XVI guns, twin mounts HA/LA Mk.XIX; 3 × QF 40 mm (1.6 in) Bofors, single mounts Mk.VII; 4 × QF 20 mm (0.79 in) Oerlikon, twin mounts Mk.V; 1 × Hedgehog 24 spigot A/S projector; 50 depth charges	1,390 tonnes (1,370 long tons; 1,530 short tons)	16 June 1943	Purchased 1948	unknown	United Kingdom	scrapped
HMIS Shamsher (K392) (Note: Formerly HMS Nadder.)	4 × QF 4-inch (101.6 mm) Mk.XVI guns, twin mounts HA/LA Mk.XIX; 3 × QF 40 mm (1.6 in) Bofors, single mounts Mk.VII; 4 × QF 20 mm (0.79 in) Oerlikon, twin mounts Mk.V; 1 × Hedgehog 24 spigot A/S projector; 50 depth charges	1,390 tonnes (1,370 long tons; 1,530 short tons)	20 January 1944	1945	1947	United Kingdom	Transferred to Pakistan and served as PNS Shamsher. Scrapped in 1959.
HMIS Bengal (K419) (Note: Formerly HMCS Kokanee. Renamed INS Bengal post republic.)	4 × QF 4-inch (101.6 mm) Mk.XVI guns, twin mounts HA/LA Mk.XIX; 3 × QF 40 mm (1.6 in) Bofors, single mounts Mk.VII; 4 × QF 20 mm (0.79 in) Oerlikon, twin mounts Mk.V; 1 × Hedgehog 24 spigot A/S projector; 50 depth charges	1,390 tonnes (1,370 long tons; 1,530 short tons)	6 June 1944	Purchased 1948	unknown	United Kingdom	scrapped

==== Blackwood class ====
The Type 14 Blackwood was a ship class of minimal "second-rate" anti-submarine warfare frigates. Built for the Royal Navy, to supplement the Type 12 class, during the 1950s at a time of increasing threat from the Soviet Union's submarine fleet, they served until the late 1970s. Twelve ships of this class served with the Royal Navy and a further three were built for the Indian Navy.

Ship	Armament	Displacement	Service			Origin	Fate
Ship	Armament	Displacement	Laid down	Commissioned	Decommissioned	Origin	Fate
INS Kirpan (F144)	3 × 40 mm (1.6 in) Bofors gun Mark 7 (quarterdeck mount later removed); 2 × Limbo Mark 10 anti-submarine mortars	1,479 tonnes (1,456 long tons; 1,630 short tons)	5 November 1956	July 1959	18 August 1978	United Kingdom	Transferred to Indian Coast Guard in 1978.
INS Kuthar (F146)	3 × 40 mm (1.6 in) Bofors gun Mark 7 (quarterdeck mount later removed); 2 × Limbo Mark 10 anti-submarine mortars	1,479 tonnes (1,456 long tons; 1,630 short tons)	19 September 1957	November 1959	18 August 1978	United Kingdom	Transferred to Indian Coast Guard in 1978.
INS Khukri (F149)	3 × 40 mm (1.6 in) Bofors gun Mark 7 (quarterdeck mount later removed); 2 × Limbo Mark 10 anti-submarine mortars	1,479 tonnes (1,456 long tons; 1,630 short tons)	29 December 1955	16 July 1958	-	United Kingdom	Sunk in action on 9 December 1971 during 1971 Indo-Pakistani War.

==== Whitby class ====
The Type 12 or Whitby class was a six-ship class of anti-submarine frigates of the British Royal Navy, which entered service late in the 1950s. They were designed in the early 1950s as first-rate ocean-going convoy escorts, in the light of experience gained during the Second World War. At the time, the Royal Navy were designing single-role escorts and the Whitbys were designed as fast convoy escorts capable of tackling high-speed submarines. However, this made the Whitbys more sophisticated and expensive to produce in large numbers in the event of a major war. Although themselves rapidly outdated, the Type 12 proved to be an excellent basis for a series of frigate designs used by the British and Commonwealth navies for the next 20 years. Two ships from this class served in the Indian Navy.

Ship	Armament	Displacement	Service			Origin	Fate
Ship	Armament	Displacement	Laid down	Commissioned	Decommissioned	Origin	Fate
INS Talwar (F140)	1 × twin 114 mm (4.5 in) gun Mark 6; 1 × twin 40 mm (1.6 in) Bofors gun Mark 2 STAAG, later; 1 × single 40 mm Bofors gun Mark 7; 2 × Limbo anti-submarine mortar Mark 10; 12 × 21-inch (533 mm) anti-submarine torpedo tubes (removed or never shipped)	2,185 tonnes (2,150 long tons; 2,409 short tons)	7 June 1957	26 April 1959	30 October 1985	United Kingdom	Broken up for scrap in 1992.
INS Trishul (F143)	1 × twin 114 mm (4.5 in) gun Mark 6; 1 × twin 40 mm (1.6 in) Bofors gun Mark 2 STAAG, later; 1 × single 40 mm Bofors gun Mark 7; 2 × Limbo anti-submarine mortar Mark 10; 12 × 21-inch (533 mm) anti-submarine torpedo tubes (removed or never shipped)	2,185 tonnes (2,150 long tons; 2,409 short tons)	19 February 1957	13 January 1960	31 August 1992	United Kingdom	Broken up for scrap in 1996.

==== Leopard class ====
The Type 41 or Leopard class was a class of anti-aircraft defence frigates built for the Royal Navy (4 ships) and Indian Navy (3 ships) in the 1950s.

Ship	Armament	Displacement	Service			Origin	Fate
Ship	Armament	Displacement	Laid down	Commissioned	Decommissioned	Origin	Fate
INS Brahmaputra (Note: Formerly HMS Panther.)	2 × twin 4.5 in guns Mark 6; 1 × twin 40 mm (1.6 in) Bofors gun STAAG Mark 2, later; 1 × single 40 mm Bofors gun Mark 9; 1 × Squid A/S mortar	2,337 tonnes (2,300 long tons; 2,576 short tons)	20 October 1955	31 March 1958	30 June 1986	United Kingdom	Broken up in 1986.
INS Beas	2 × twin 4.5 in guns Mark 6; 1 × twin 40 mm (1.6 in) Bofors gun STAAG Mark 2, later; 1 × single 40 mm Bofors gun Mark 9; 1 × Squid A/S mortar	2,337 tonnes (2,300 long tons; 2,576 short tons)	29 November 1956	24 May 1960	22 December 1992	United Kingdom	Broken up in 1992.
INS Betwa	2 × twin 4.5 in guns Mark 6; 1 × twin 40 mm (1.6 in) Bofors gun STAAG Mark 2, later; 1 × single 40 mm Bofors gun Mark 9; 1 × Squid A/S mortar	2,337 tonnes (2,300 long tons; 2,576 short tons)	29 May 1957	8 December 1960	31 December 1991	United Kingdom	Broken up in 1991.

==== Nilgiri class ====
The Nilgiri class are updated versions of the Leander class, designed and built for the Indian Navy by Mazagon Dock Limited in Mumbai. Six ships were built between 1972 and 1981. Vessels of the class formed the 14th Frigate Squadron. The lead ship, INS Nilgiri, was the first major warship to be built in India, in collaboration with Yarrow Shipbuilders of the United Kingdom. The class and the ships are named for hill ranges of India. With the entry into service of the Shivalik class, the Nilgiri class has been decommissioned by the navy, five ships having been decommissioned, with one having been sunk in an accident. INS Taragiri was the last ship of the class to be decommissioned, on 27 June 2013 in Mumbai, after serving 33 years in the navy.

Ship	Armament	Displacement	Service		Origin	Fate
Ship	Armament	Displacement	Commissioned	Decommissioned	Origin	Fate
INS Nilgiri (F33)	2 × MK.6 Vickers 115 mm (4.5 in) guns; 2 × AK-630 6-barreled 30 mm (1.2 in) gatling guns; 2 × Oerlikon 20mm guns; 2 × triple ILAS 3 324 mm (12.8 in) torpedo tubes with Whitehead A244S or the Indian NST-58 torpedoes	2,682 tonnes (2,640 long tons; 2,956 short tons)	3 June 1972	31 May 1996	India	Sunk on 24 April 1997, in a test firing of a Sea Eagle anti-ship missile by a Sea Harrier Frs Mk 51 taking off from the aircraft carrier, INS Viraat.
INS Himgiri (F34)	2 × MK.6 Vickers 115 mm (4.5 in) guns; 2 × AK-630 6-barreled 30 mm (1.2 in) gatling guns; 2 × Oerlikon 20mm guns; 2 × triple ILAS 3 324 mm (12.8 in) torpedo tubes with Whitehead A244S or the Indian NST-58 torpedoes	2,682 tonnes (2,640 long tons; 2,956 short tons)	23 November 1974	6 May 2005	India	Awaiting disposal as of December 2016.
INS Udaygiri (F35)	2 × MK.6 Vickers 115 mm (4.5 in) guns; 2 × AK-630 6-barreled 30 mm (1.2 in) gatling guns; 2 × Oerlikon 20mm guns; 2 × triple ILAS 3 324 mm (12.8 in) torpedo tubes with Whitehead A244S or the Indian NST-58 torpedoes	2,682 tonnes (2,640 long tons; 2,956 short tons)	18 February 1976	24 August 2007	India	Awaiting disposal as of December 2016.
INS Dunagiri (F36)	2 × MK.6 Vickers 115 mm (4.5 in) guns; 2 × AK-630 6-barreled 30 mm (1.2 in) gatling guns; 2 × Oerlikon 20mm guns; 2 × triple ILAS 3 324 mm (12.8 in) torpedo tubes with Whitehead A244S or the Indian NST-58 torpedoes	2,682 tonnes (2,640 long tons; 2,956 short tons)	5 May 1977	20 October 2010	India	Awaiting disposal as of December 2016.
INS Taragiri (F41)	2 × MK.6 Vickers 115 mm (4.5 in) guns; 2 × AK-630 6-barreled 30 mm (1.2 in) gatling guns; 2 × Oerlikon 20mm guns; 2 × triple ILAS 3 324 mm (12.8 in) torpedo tubes with Whitehead A244S or the Indian NST-58 torpedoes	2,682 tonnes (2,640 long tons; 2,956 short tons)	16 May 1980	27 June 2013	India	Awaiting disposal as of December 2016.
INS Vindhyagiri (F42)	2 × MK.6 Vickers 115 mm (4.5 in) guns; 2 × AK-630 6-barreled 30 mm (1.2 in) gatling guns; 2 × Oerlikon 20mm guns; 2 × triple ILAS 3 324 mm (12.8 in) torpedo tubes with Whitehead A244S or the Indian NST-58 torpedoes	2,682 tonnes (2,640 long tons; 2,956 short tons)	8 July 1981	11 June 2012	India	Collided with a merchant ship while in Mumbai harbour on 30 January 2011; sank after on-board fire. Re-floated and decommissioned with full honours in 2012.

==== Leander class ====
The Leander-class, or Type 12I frigates, comprising twenty-six vessels, was among the most numerous and long-lived classes of frigates in the modern history of the Royal Navy. The class was built in three batches between 1959 and 1973. INS Krishna, formerly HMS Andromeda, from Batch 3A, served in the Indian Navy.

Ship	Picture (Note: HMS Andromeda, 1970 (IWM).jpg—Image attribution to the Royal Navy. Re-use under the Open Government Licence by authority of The Controller of Her Majesty's Stationery Office.)	Armament	Displacement	Service				Origin	Fate
Ship	Picture	Armament	Displacement	Laid down	Commissioned (Royal Navy)	Commissioned (Indian Navy)	Decommissioned	Origin	Fate
INS Krishna (F46) (Note: Formerly HMS Andromeda.)		4 × Exocet surface-to-surface missiles; SeaWolf surface-to-air missiles; 2 × Bofors 40 mm guns	2,500 tonnes (2,500 long tons; 2,800 short tons)	25 May 1966	2 December 1968	22 August 1995	24 May 2012	United Kingdom	Used as an training ship.Awaiting disposal

==== Godavari class ====
The Godavari-class frigates (formerly Type 16 or Project 16 frigates) were guided-missile frigates of the Indian Navy. The Godavari class was the first significant indigenous warship design-and-development initiative of the Indian Navy. The design is a modification of the Nilgiri class, with larger hull and updated armaments, as well as with a focus on an indigenous content of 72%. The class and the ships took their names from Indian rivers. INS Gomati was the first Indian Navy vessel to employ digital electronics in her combat data system. The ships combined Indian, Russian, and Western weapons systems. The last of the class in service, INS Gomati, was decommissioned on 28 May 2022.

Ship	Picture	Armament	Displacement	Service			Origin	Fate
Ship	Picture	Armament	Displacement	Laid down	Commissioned	Decommissioned	Origin	Fate
INS Godavari (F20)		4 × P-20M (SS-N-2D Styx) AShMs in single-tube launchers; Barak SAM system; 2 × 57 mm (2.2 in) (twin) guns at 90° elevation; 4 × AK-230 30 mm (1.2 in) gunmounts with 85° elevation (in CIWS role only); 6 × 324 mm (12.8 in) ILAS 3 torpedo tubes with Whitehead A244S or NST 58 anti-submarine torpedoes	3,600 tonnes (3,500 long tons; 4,000 short tons)	3 November 1978	10 December 1983	23 December 2015	India(MDL)	Sunk as target, 2020.
INS Ganga (F22)		4 × SS-N-2D Styx AShM; 24 × Barak SAM (3 × 8 cell VLS units); 1 × AK-725 twin-barreled 57 mm (2.2 in) gun; 4 × AK-630 6-barreled 30 mm (1.2 in) gatling	3,850 tonnes (3,790 long tons; 4,240 short tons)	1980	30 December 1985	22 March 2018	India(MDL)	Awaiting Disposal
INS Gomati (F21)		4 × SS-N-2D Styx AShM; 24 × Barak SAM (3 × 8 cell VLS units); 1 × AK-725 twin-barreled 57 mm (2.2 in) gun; 4 × AK-630 6-barreled 30 mm (1.2 in) gatling	3,850 tonnes (3,790 long tons; 4,240 short tons)	1981	16 April 1988	28 May 2022	India(MDL)	

== Future ships ==
A total of eleven ships from two different projects, Project 17A and Admiral Grigorovich classes, are expected to be commissioned into the Indian Navy. Most of these ships are under construction .

=== Nilgiri-class frigate (2019) ===
The Nilgiri-class or Project 17A-class frigate is a follow-on of the Project 17 Shivalik-class frigate for the Indian Navy. A total of seven ships will be built at Mazagon Dock and GRSE. The first ship in active service, while rest of the six ships have been launched.

Picture	Armament	Displacement	Status	Origin
	2 x 16 cell VLS launched Barak 8 missiles; 8-cell VLS launched BrahMos, anti-ship and land-attack cruise missiles; 1 × Oto Melara 76 mm (3.0 in); 2 × AK-630 30 mm (1.2 in) CIWS; 2 × OFT 12.7 mm M2 Stabilized Remote Controlled Gun; 2 × triple-torpedo tubes (Torpedo Advanced Light Shyena); 2 × RBU-6000 Anti-submarine rocket launchers	6,670 tonnes (6,560 long tons; 7,350 short tons)	4 Active 2 Delivered 1 Launched	India

=== Talwar-class ===
The Talwar-class is a variant of the Russian-built Admiral Grigorovich class frigate in service with the Indian Navy. Six of this class were planned for service with the Russian Navy, with the engines to be supplied by the Ukrainian government-owned firm Zorya-Mashproekt. Of the first batch of three frigates, two vessels are in service with Russia as of February 2017, with the last to be commissioned in 2016. The annexation of Crimea by the Russian Federation halted any further cooperation between the Russian and Ukrainian governments, leaving the second batch of three ships without engines. In August 2016, Russia agreed to sell the second batch of frigates to India. India will likely be able to acquire Ukrainian-built engines on its own. The frigates remain under construction, and it is possible the hulls could be transported to India for their final fitting-out, including the installation of their engines. Indian Navy has already inducted seven of these ships in two batches while 3 more ships with one built by Yantar Shipyard (Russia) and 2 by Goa Shipyard (India).

Picture (Note: Адмирал_Григорович.jpg–Image attribution to the Russian Navy (Mil.ru). This file comes from the websites (mil.ru, минобороны.рф) of the Ministry of Defence of the Russian Federation and is copyrighted. This file is licensed under the Creative Commons Attribution 4.0 Licence.)	Armament	Displacement	Status	Origin
	24 × Shtil-1 medium-range missiles; 8 × Igla-1E (SA-16); 8 × VLS launched BrahMos, anti-ship and land-attack cruise missiles; 1 × 100 mm (3.9 in) A-190E gun; 2 × AK-630 CIWS; 2 × 533 mm (21.0 in) torpedo tubes; 1 × RBU-6000 (RPK-8) rocket launcher	4,035 tonnes (3,971 long tons; 4,448 short tons)	2 Active 2 launched	India(Goa Shipyard)

=== Project 17B-class frigate ===
The Project 17B-class frigate is a follow-on of the Project 17A Nilgiri-class frigate for the Indian Navy. A total of seven or eight ships will be built indigenously. They expected to have a displacement of 6,700–8,000 tonnes (6,600–7,900 long tons).

== See also ==
- List of active Indian Navy ships
- Future of the Indian Navy
- List of ships of the Indian Navy
- List of submarines of the Indian Navy
- List of destroyers of the Indian Navy
- List of corvettes of the Indian Navy

== Notes ==
Footnotes

Citations
