= U83 =

U83 may refer to:

- German submarine U-83, various vessels
- HMIS Lawrence (U83), a sloop of the Royal Indian Navy
- Small nucleolar RNA SNORD83
- U83, a line of the Düsseldorf Stadtbahn
