= INS Udaygiri =

The following ships of the Indian Navy have been named INS Udaygiri:

- INS Udaygiri (F35) was a Nilgiri-class frigate launched in 1972
- INS Udaygiri (2022) is a Nilgiri-class frigate launched in 2022
