= Jagjit Singh Bedi =

Vice Admiral in Indian Navy

Vice Admiral Jagjit Singh Bedi PVSM, UYSM, AVSM, VSM
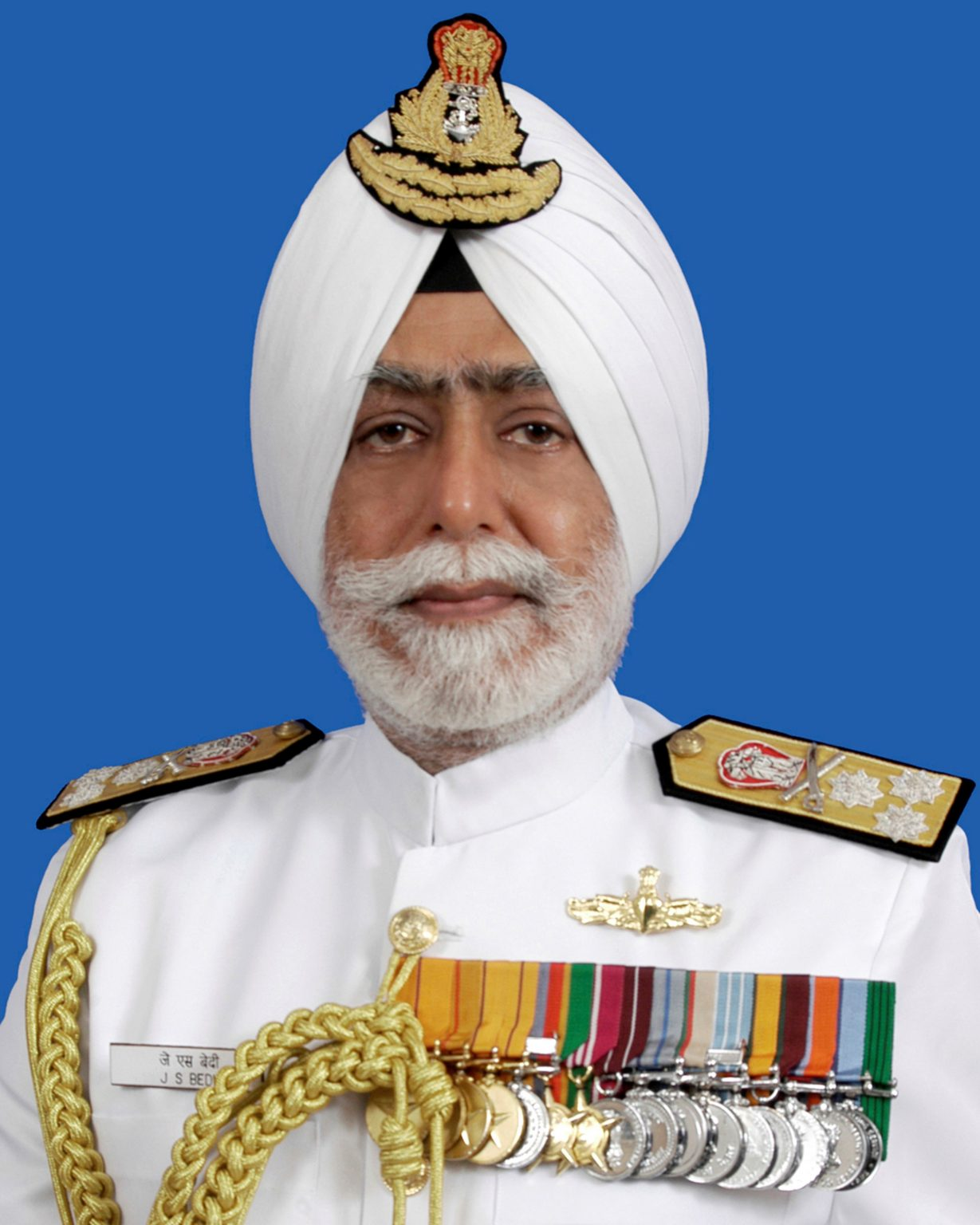
- Military career
- Allegiance: India
- Branch: Indian Navy
- Service years: 1969 - 2009
- Rank: Vice Admiral
- Nickname: Jaggi
- Commands: Western Naval Command; Southern Naval Command; Western Fleet; INS Viraat (R22); INS Ranjit (D53); Indian Naval Academy; INS Udaygiri (F35); INS Bedi; INS Atul
- Conflicts: Operation Parakram
- Awards: Param Vishisht Seva Medal; Uttam Yudh Seva Medal; Ati Vishisht Seva Medal; Vishisht Seva Medal

Vice Admiral Jagjit Singh 'Jaggi' Bedi, PVSM, UYSM, AVSM, VSM is a former Flag officer in the Indian Navy. He last served as the Flag Officer Commanding-in-Chief Western Naval Command, from 2007 to 2009. He earlier commanded the Southern Naval Command and the Western Fleet.

== Early life and education ==
Bedi was born in Nabha on 25 April 1949. His father and grandfather both served the Nabha State. His grandfather was the Revenue Minister of the state. His father was a commissioned officer in the Nabha Akal Regiment of the Nabha States Forces. After the Independence of India, the regiment became the 14th battalion, Punjab Regiment.

Bedi attended the Delhi Public School, Mathura Road, New Delhi. When the Punjab Public School, Nabha was established in 1960, he joined the first batch of the school. He subsequently joined the National Defence Academy, Khadakwasla in 1965.

== Naval career ==
Bedi was commissioned into the Indian Navy on 1 July 1969. After a few sea tenures, he opted to specialise in Signal communication and electronic warfare. As a young Lieutenant, he commanded the Ajay-class Seaward Defence Boat INS Atul. He also commanded the Pondicherry-class minesweeper INS Bedi. He was selected to attend the Royal Naval College, Greenwich, where he completed his staff course. He served as the Staff Officer to the Deputy and Vice Chief of the Naval Staff. As a commander, he commanded the Nilgiri-class frigate INS Udaygiri (F35). He also served as the deputy director (Electronic Warfare) at naval headquarters. In the late 80s, he was appointed Chief Instructor and Officer-in-Charge of the Signals School, his alma-mater, in Kochi. In 1990, he attended the Naval War College in Rhode Island.

In December 1991, Bedi took over as the Commanding Officer of the naval base in Goa, INS Mandovi. He concurrently served as the Commandant of Indian Naval Academy. The academy moved to its present location, Ezhimala, in 2008. In the rank of Captain, Bedi served as the Directing Staff at the College of Naval Warfare and as the Director of Naval Plans at NHQ. He also commanded the Rajput-class guided missile destroyer INS Ranjit (D53). On 26 January 1994, he was awarded the Vishisht Seva Medal. Later that year, in September, Bedi took command of the aircraft carrier INS Viraat (R22). He was the 6th Commanding Officer of Viraat.

=== Flag rank ===
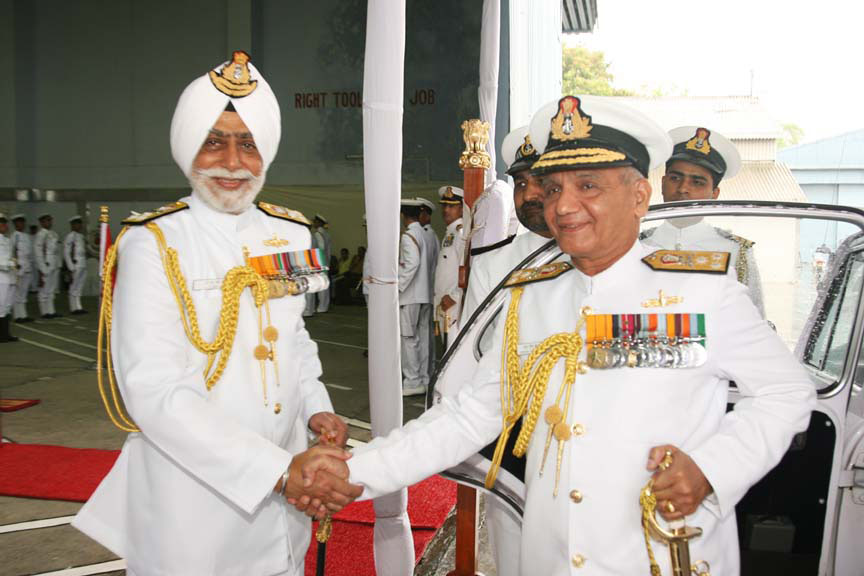
VAdm Bedi (left) taking command of Western Naval Command from Vadm SS Byce.

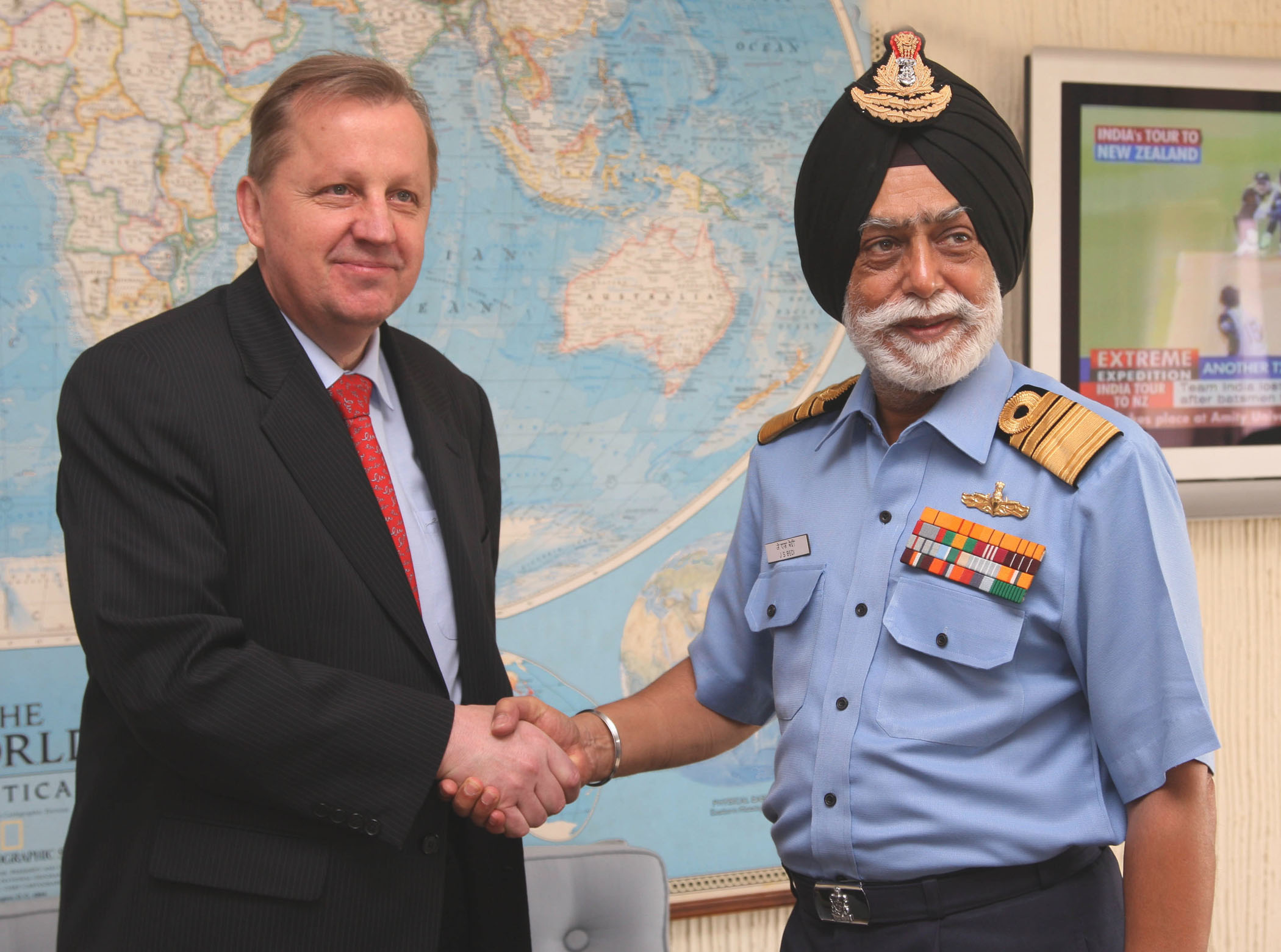
VAdm Bedi (right) as FOC-in-C WNC with the chairman, Defence Committee of Parliament of Finland, Juha Korkeaoja.

In 1996, Bedi was promoted to the rank of acting Rear Admiral and appointed Assistant Chief of the Naval Staff (Plans & Policy) at NHQ. He subsequently took over as the Chief of Staff (COS), Western Naval Command. He served in this appointment during Operation Rainbow. He was awarded the Ati Vishisht Seva Medal on 26 January 1999.

On 10 September 2001, Bedi was appointed Flag Officer Commanding Western Fleet (FOCWF). He took command of the Western Fleet, from Rear Admiral Sangram Singh Byce. In December 2001, after the attack on Indian Parliament, the armed forces were put on high alert as part of Operation Parakram. The Western Fleet ships were deployed. During the operation, Karachi harbour was virtually blocked and entire Makran coast was under constant surveillance. For his command of the Western Fleet during the hostilities, Bedi was awarded the Uttam Yudh Seva Medal. In January 2003, he relinquished command of the fleet.

Bedi was promoted to the rank of Vice Admiral and moved to NHQ as the Controller of Warship Production and Acquisition (CWP&A). The CWP&A integrates and coordinates the various activities of shipbuilding and ship acquisition at NHQ.

On 27 December 2005, Bedi was appointed Deputy Chief of the Naval Staff. After a short stint as DCNS, he was promoted to Commander-in-Chief grade and appointed Flag Officer Commanding-in-Chief Southern Naval Command (FOC-in-C SNC), succeeding Vice Admiral S. C. S. Bangara in July 2006. He was awarded the Param Vishisht Seva Medal on 26 January 2007. He served as FOC-in-C SNC for a year. On 1 August 2007, he took over the Western Naval Command (WNC) as the Commander-in-Chief. He was at the helm of WNC for close to two years. He superannuated on 30 April 2009, after 40 years of service, and handed over command to Vice Admiral Sanjeev Bhasin.

== Personal life ==
Bedi married Kanwal Bedi in 1975. The couple has two daughters who in turn are married with the oldest having two children, a son and a daughter.

== Awards and decorations ==

Param Vishisht Seva Medal	Uttam Yudh Seva Medal	Ati Vishisht Seva Medal	Vishisht Seva Medal
Special Service Medal	Poorvi Star	Paschimi Star	Sangram Medal
Operation Vijay Medal	Operation Parakram Medal	Videsh Seva Medal	50th Independence Anniversary Medal
25th Independence Anniversary Medal	30 Years Long Service Medal	20 Years Long Service Medal	9 Years Long Service Medal

== Bibliography ==
- Hiranandani, G M (2005), Transition to eminence : the Indian navy 1976-1990, Lancer Publishers, ISBN 978-8170622666

Military offices
Preceded by K. P. Mathew	Commandant of Indian Naval Academy; 1991 - 1993	Succeeded by Nirmal Kumar Verma
Preceded by Yashwant Prasad	Commanding Officer INS Viraat; 1994 - 1995	Succeeded by Vijay Shankar
Preceded by Sangram Singh Byce	Flag Officer Commanding Western Fleet; 2001 - 2003	Succeeded by Vijay Shankar
Preceded by Sureesh Mehta	Deputy Chief of the Naval Staff; 2005 - 2006	Succeeded by R. P. Suthan
Preceded by S. C. S. Bangara	Flag Officer Commanding-in-Chief Southern Naval Command; 2006 - 2007	Succeeded by S. K. Damle
Preceded by Sangram Singh Byce	Flag Officer Commanding-in-Chief Western Naval Command; 2007 - 2009	Succeeded by Sanjeev Bhasin
