= INS Nilgiri =

The following ships of the Indian Navy have been named INS Nilgiri:

- INS Nilgiri (F33) was a Nilgiri-class frigate launched in 1968 and expended as a target in 1997
- INS Nilgiri (2019) is a Nilgiri-class frigate launched in 2019
