= Skeleton Coast (1987 film) =

- Directed by: John Cardos
- Written by: Nadia Caillou; Peter Welbeck (screenplay)
- Produced by: Harry Alan Towers
- Starring: Ernest Borgnine; Robert Vaughn; Oliver Reed
- Cinematography: Hanro Möhr
- Edited by: Mac Errington; Allan Morrison
- Music by: Barry Bekker; Colin Shapiro
- Production company: Breton Film Productions
- Distributed by: Troma Entertainment
- Release date: 1987
- Running time: 98 minutes
- Country: South Africa
- Language: English

Skeleton Coast is a 1987 South African-made mercenary war film directed by John Cardos in the first of three films for producer Harry Alan Towers. It was the first of Towers' Breton Film Productions.

== Plot ==
During the Angolan Civil War, CIA agent Michael Smith is working with UNITA rebels. He is captured by the Angolan Armed Forces and sent to a prison to be interrogated by an East German named Major Schneider. Smith's father, retired US Marine Corps Colonel Bill Smith has no faith in the United States Government freeing his son. The Colonel travels to South West Africa where he pays the mysterious Elia for accurate information about his son's location of captivity. Colonel Smith hires seven mercenaries that he will lead into Angola to rescue his son.

Captain Simpson, the leader of a security force of a diamond mine has a man keeping his eye on the Colonel fearing that he may be a diamond smuggler. Elia's wife Opal is carrying on an illicit relationship with Simpson and informs him that the Colonel murdered his security man, in reality he was murdered by Rick Weston, the leader of Smith's private army. Rick informed the Colonel he was an Angolan secret agent. Elia then discovered that either Col. Smith paid him in counterfeit money or the money was replaced with counterfeit money in his safe. Entering Angola, the mercenaries team up with Sekassi, the Jonas Savimbi type leader of the rebels to support their rescue of Michael Smith.

== Cast ==
- Ernest Borgnine as Col. Bill Smith
- Robert Vaughn as Maj. Schneider
- Oliver Reed as Capt. David Simpson
- Herbert Lom as Elia
- Daniel Greene as Rick Weston
- Leon Isaac Kennedy as Chuck
- Nancy Mulford as Sam
- Peter Kwong as Tohsiro
- Robin Townsend as Opal
- Simon Sabela as Sekassi
- Arnold Vosloo as Blade
- Tullio Moneta as Armando
- Larry Taylor as Robbins
- Jonathan Rands as Michael Smith

== Production ==
Nadia Caillou, the daughter of screenwriter and author Alan Caillou, made her screenwriting debut in the film. She had previously acted in John Cardos's 1977 film Kingdom of the Spiders. Cardos claimed Harry Alan Towers reedited the film that destroyed the continuity of the story.

Tullio Moneta was second-in-command to Mike Hoare when the latter led the 1981 Seychelles coup attempt at Mahe Airport in the Seychelles and was sentenced to five years in prison in November 1981.
