= INS Himgiri =

The following ships of the Indian Navy have been named INS Himgiri:

- INS Himgiri (F34) was a Nilgiri-class frigate launched in 1970 and decommissioned in 2005
- INS Himgiri (2020) is a Nilgiri-class frigate launched in 2020
