= Operation Flowers are Blooming =

1986 operation by the Indian Navy

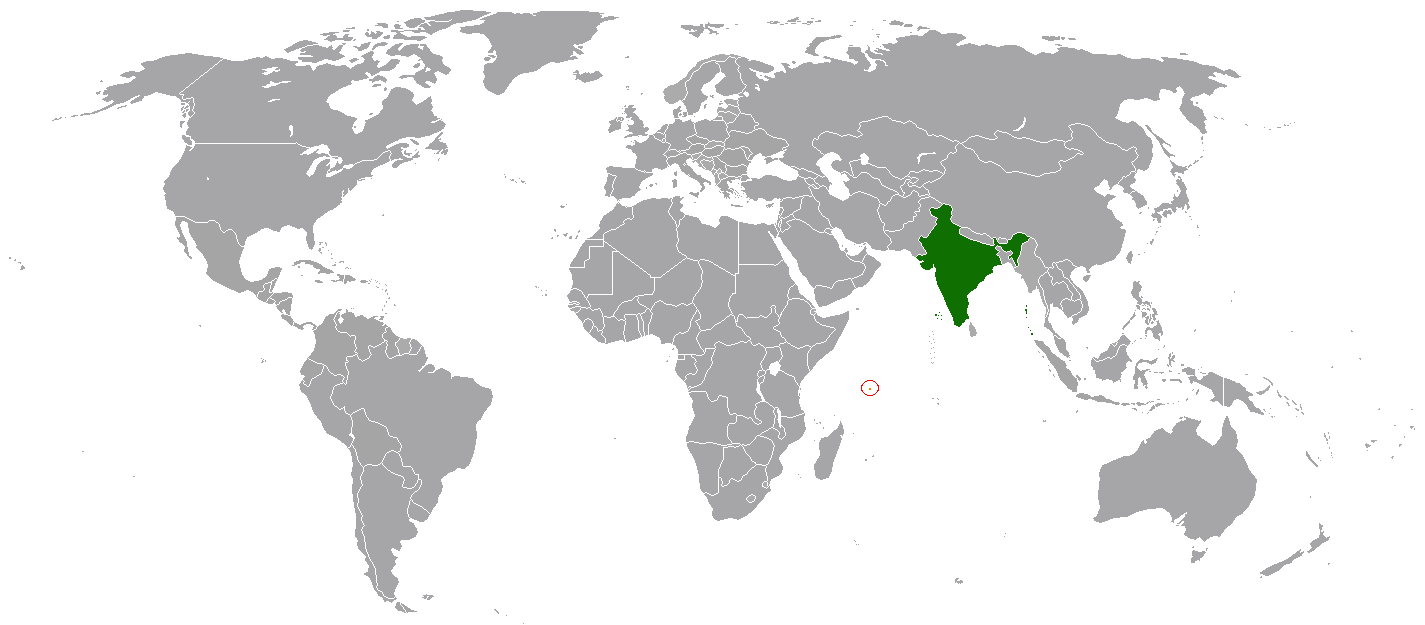
- India (Green) and Seychelles (Orange)
Date	June–August 1986
Location	Seychelles, Indian Ocean
Result	Indian and Seychellois victory

Belligerents
India; Seychelles	Mercenaries

Commanders and leaders
(India) Indira Gandhi (India) Rajiv Gandhi (India) Radhakrishna (Seychelles) France-Albert René	Ogilvy Berlouis

Operation Flowers are Blooming was the name of an operation by the Indian Navy to help avert a threatened coup against the government of President France-Albert René in the Seychelles in 1986.

== Background ==
During the 1980s there were several coup attempts against René. In 1981, the South African security services famously organised an attempted coup against René by a group of 44 white mercenaries led by Colonel "Mad" Mike Hoare. Other coups were also planned by elements in René’s regime, among Seychellois exiles in Britain, South Africa and Australia and by anti-communists in Pretoria and Washington. President René turned to India as a security provider, seeking a commitment from Indian Prime Minister Indira Gandhi to intervene against any coups, but Gandhi declined to give a public commitment to intervene.

== Operation ==
In 1986, there was a series of coup attempts against President René led by the Seychelles Minister of Defence, Ogilvy Berlouis. This included a plot in June 1986, codenamed Operation Distant Lash, which involved some 30 mercenaries and 350 Seychellois.

When New Delhi was informed of an impending coup by intelligence sources, Prime Minister Rajiv Gandhi personally contacted the Indian Chief of Naval Staff, Admiral Radhakrishna Hariram Tahiliani, with a verbal request to provide assistance to René. Coincidentally, the Indian Navy had already dispatched the frigate INS Vindhyagiri on a scheduled visit to the Seychelles. It was decided that on arrival Vindhyagiri would report an engineering defect requiring an extended stay in Port Victoria. A senior Indian naval officer was then sent to the Seychelles on a commercial airline to command the operation and an "engineering" team of 20 sailors trained in weapons was readied for dispatch to Port Victoria. The extended presence of the Vindhyagiri in Port Victoria averted the planned coup.

Two months later, Berlouis made another attempt to unseat President René which India again helped to quash. The plot was uncovered in late August 1986 while President René was attending a meeting of the Non-Aligned Movement in Harare with Rajiv Gandhi and other leaders of non-aligned states. Gandhi lent René his own plane, called Air India One, to return to the Seychelles early. According to one report on 6 September, René, disguised as an Indian woman wearing a sari, was met at the airport by the Indian High Commissioner and taken to the Commissioner's residence. Berlouis and other plotters were then tracked to the island of Praslin. Berlouis and four other army officers were forced to resign and Berlouis left for London.
