= Vijay Shankar (admiral) =

Indian admiral

Vice Admiral Vijay Shankar PVSM, AVSM
- Born: 30 September 1949 (age 77); Bangalore, India
- Military career
- Allegiance: India
- Branch: Indian Navy
- Service years: 1970–2009
- Rank: Vice Admiral
- Commands: Andaman and Nicobar Command; Strategic Forces Command; Western Fleet; INS Viraat (R22); INS Ganga (F22); INS Himgiri (F34); INS Panaji (1960)
- Conflicts: Indo-Pakistani War of 1971; Operation Pawan
- Awards: Param Vishisht Seva Medal; Ati Vishisht Seva Medal

Vice Admiral Vijay Shankar, PVSM, AVSM (born 30 September 1949) is a retired Indian Navy Admiral who served as the CINCAN and as the Commander-in-Chief, Strategic Forces Command (SFC) of the Indian Armed Forces. His earlier served as the Flag Officer Commanding Western Fleet (FOCWF). He also served as the Commanding Officer of INS Viraat (R22), INS Ganga (F22), INS Himgiri (F34) and INS Panaji (1960).

Vice Admiral Shankar retired on 30 September 2009. Since then he has held the Admiral Katari Chair at the United Services Institution.

== Early life ==
Shankar was born on 30 September 1949 in Bangalore, India. His father was an officer in the Royal Indian Air Force, and later in the Indian Air Force. He did his early education in India as well as the United Kingdom.

== Naval career ==
Vijay Shankar graduated from the 34th course of the National Defence Academy, Pune. He was commissioned into the Indian Navy on 1 January 1970. A specialist in Navigation and Direction, he holds a Master of Science degree in Defence Studies. He is a graduate of the Defence Services Staff College in Wellington, the Naval Higher Command Course from the College of Naval Warfare, Karanja and the Naval War College, United States.

His staff appointments included those as Deputy Director of Combat Policy and Tactics, Naval Headquarters; Chief Instructor at the Navigation and Direction School, Kochi, as Director of the School of Maritime Warfare and Tactics, Kochi, as Senior Instructor at the Defence Services Staff College and Director of Staff Requirements at Naval Headquarters.

=== Flag rank ===
He was promoted to the Flag rank of Rear Admiral in April 1999 and appointed as the Chief of Staff, Southern Naval Command. Next, he served as the Assistant Controller, Aircraft Carrier Projects at Naval Headquarters (NHQ). He also served as the Flag Officer Commanding Western Fleet (FOCWF).

After being promoted to Vice Admiral in November 2005, he was appointed Deputy Chief of Integrated Defence Staff (Operations). He then led Doctrine Organization and Training, Integrated Defence Staff (IDS) at Defence Headquarters (DHQ).

Shankar has had the distinction of commanding both the joint-services commands of the Indian Armed Forces. He took over as the Commander-in-Chief, Strategic Forces Command (SFC) in December 2006. He became the CINCAN in September 2008.

His assignments at sea included specialist tenures of several fleet units between 1970 and 1983. He was a part of the commissioning crews of INS Ghorpad (L14) in Poland and of INS Rana (D52) in the erstwhile Soviet Union. He has served as the Fleet Operations Officer of the Western Fleet. He was appointed the commanding officer of INS Panaji (1960) in 1973, INS Himgiri in 1987, INS Ganga in 1993 and INS Viraat in 1995. He took command of the Sword Arm of the Indian Navy as the Flag Officer Commanding Western Fleet (FOCWF) in January 2003.

His operational experience included active service during the Indo-Pakistani War of 1971. He commanded INS Himgiri during its deployment as part of Operation Pawan. He served as the Chief of Staff, Southern Naval Command during Operation Vijay (1999).

== Awards and decorations ==
During his career, Shankar has been awarded the Ati Vishisht Seva Medal in 2002 and the Param Vishisht Seva Medal in 2008.

Param Vishisht Seva Medal	Ati Vishisht Seva Medal	Poorvi Star	Paschimi Star
Special Service Medal	Sangram Medal	Operation Vijay Medal	Operation Parakram Medal
Sainya Seva Medal	Videsh Seva Medal	50th Anniversary of Independence Medal	25th Anniversary of Independence Medal
30 Years Long Service Medal	20 Years Long Service Medal		9 Years Long Service Medal

== Later career ==
Shankar lives in the Nilgiris area. He has lectured at Defence Services Staff College, Higher Command College and the National Maritime Foundation. He holds the Admiral Katari Chair at the United Service Institution, is a distinguished Fellow at the Institute for Peace and Conflict Studies, New Delhi and is a member of the Adjunct Faculty at the National Institute of Advanced Studies, Bengaluru. He is a recognized expert on nuclear security issues in the Indian subcontinent. Internationally, his participation in the Track II Ottawa Dialogue, the Bellagio Carnegie Endowment discussions, the Indo-Sino-Pak trilateral dialogue, Chaophraya Dialogue and the papers he has presented there seek to provide a new paradigm for nuclear security on the sub-continent. He has delivered lectures and participated in discussions at academic and research institutions in the United States, including the Massachusetts Institute of Technology’s (MIT) Security Studies Program, The University of Tennessee, The Howard Baker Center at Knoxville, The Oak Ridge National Laboratory, Lawrence Livermore (Open Campus), The Atlantic Council and the Carnegie Endowment for Peace.

Military offices
Preceded by Jagjit Singh Bedi	Flag Officer Commanding Western Fleet; 2003–2004	Succeeded by Pratap Singh Byce
Preceded by Air Marshal Avinash Deodata Joshi	Commander-in-Chief, Strategic Forces Command; 2006–2008	Succeeded by Lieutenant General Balraj Singh Nagal
Preceded by Sadhashivan Radhakrishnan	Commander-in-Chief, Andaman and Nicobar Command; 2008–2009	Succeeded by Devendra Kumar Joshi
