= Nilgiri-class frigate =

Nilgiri-class frigate may refer to:

- Nilgiri-class frigate (1972), a class of frigates that served in the Indian Navy between 1972 and 2013.
- Nilgiri-class frigate (2019), a class of frigates built for the Indian Navy since 2017.
