= United Nations Security Council Resolution 496 =

UN Security Council Resolution 496
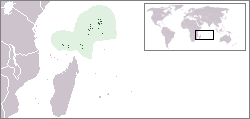
- Seychelles
- Date: 15 December 1981
- Meeting no.: 2,314
- Code: S/RES/496 (Document)
- Subject: Seychelles
- Voting summary: 15 voted for; None voted against; None abstained
- Result: Adopted

Security Council composition
- Permanent members: China; France; Soviet Union; United Kingdom; United States
- Non-permanent members: East Germany; Ireland; Japan; Mexico; Niger; Panama; Philippines; Spain; Tunisia; Uganda

United Nations Security Council resolution 496, adopted unanimously on 15 December 1981, after hearing representations from the Seychelles, the Council condemned the recent coup attempt in the country by foreign mercenaries, including Mike Hoare, allegedly backed by South Africa, and the subsequent hijacking of an Air India plane, on 25 November 1981.

The resolution went on to establish a commission, with the assistance of the Secretary-General, to investigate the events and to report back by no later than 31 January 1982.

Approximately 40 mercenaries were caught with weapons at Seychelles International Airport and the coup failed. The representative of the Seychelles, Glovanella Gonthier, told the Council that there was "every reason to believe that South Africa might have been involved in the aggression". The country later called for a civil aviation boycott of South Africa in response, but South Africa denied involvement and said it would try some of the 39 mercenaries who had landed in the country aboard the hijacked Air India flight.

A report on the events was examined in Resolution 507 (1982).

== See also ==
- History of Seychelles
- List of United Nations Security Council Resolutions 401 to 500 (1976–1982)
- 1981 Seychelles coup d'état attempt
