= INS Taragiri (F41) =

1976 Nilgiri-class frigate

History

India
- Name: INS Taragiri
- Launched: 25 October 1976
- Commissioned: 16 May 1980
- Decommissioned: 27 June 2013

General characteristics
- Class & type: Nilgiri-class frigate
- Displacement: 2682 tons (standard); 2962 tons (full load)
- Length: 113 m (371 ft)
- Beam: 13 m (43 ft)
- Draught: 4.3 m (14 ft)
- Propulsion: 2 × 550 psi boilers; 2 × 30,000 hp (22,000 kW) motors
- Speed: 28 knots (52 km/h; 32 mph)
- Range: 4,000 nmi (7,400 km; 4,600 mi) at 12 kn (22 km/h; 14 mph)
- Complement: 267 (incl 17 officers)
- Sensors & processing systems: Signaal DA05 / BEL PFN513 radar; Signaal LW08 / BEL RAWL02 surface radar; Signaal ZW06 / BEL RASHMI navigation radar; Signaal M-45 navigation radar; Westinghouse SQS-505 / Graesby 750 sonar; Type 170 active attack sonar
- Armament: 2 × MK.6 Vickers 115 mm guns; 4 × AK-230 30 mm guns; 2 × Oerlikon 20 mm guns; 2 × triple ILAS 3 324 mm torpedo tubes with Whitehead A244S or the Indian NST-58 torpedoes; 1 × twin-tube launcher for Bofors 375mm anti submarine rockets
- Aircraft carried: 1 Westland Sea King or HAL Chetak

INS Taragiri (F41) was a Nilgiri-class frigate of the Indian Navy. Taragiri was commissioned into the Navy on 16 May 1980 and was decommissioned on 27 June 2013 in Mumbai, after serving 33 years in the navy.

== History ==
INS Taragiri was the final ship of the Nilgiri class, and was named after a hill range in the Garhwal Himalaya. Cdr. Rahul Shankar was the 27th and last commanding officer of the frigate. Along with INS Vindhyagiri, she was significantly modified. A Westland Sea King anti-submarine helicopter, A244S 321 mm triple torpedo tubes and a twin-tube launcher for Bofors 375mm anti submarine rockets were added. Later, she was also fitted with advanced ship control systems for controlling unmanned aerial vehicles. These modifications gave the ship enhanced anti-submarine and network-centric warfare capabilities. She was operational under the Western Naval Fleet of the navy and performed surveillance missions when on blue water operations, and later performed coastal patrolling and anti-piracy operations. The Ship was also the first to be deployed during Operation Talwar, sailing with the INS Veer and INS Nirghat to block Trade in the Arabian Sea during the Kargil war.
