= 1981 Seychelles coup attempt =

Failed coup attempt by South Africa

1981 Seychelles coup d'état attempt
- Part of the Cold War
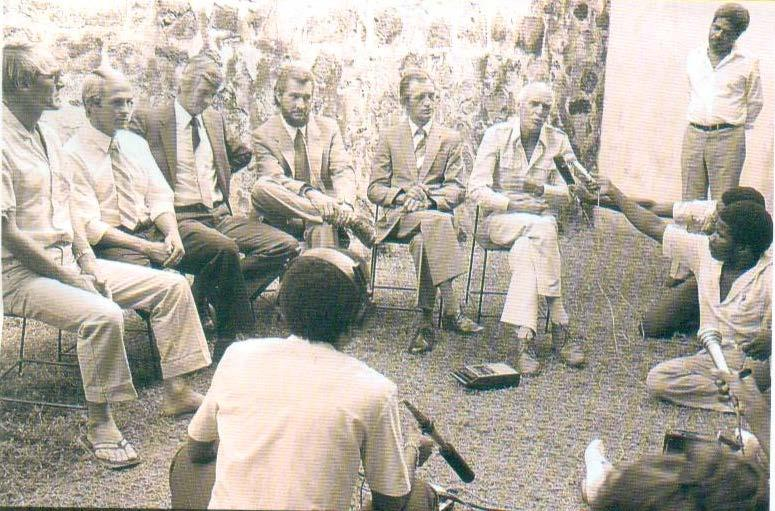
- The perpetrators of the coup being interviewed by local media: L to R: Dolinchek, England, Carey, Brooks, Sims and Puren.
Date	25 November 1981
Location	Seychelles International Airport, Mahé, Seychelles 04°40′27.64″S 55°31′18.67″E
Result	Coup failure

Belligerents
Seychelles	South Africa; Mercenary forces Mercenary forces

Commanders and leaders
France-Albert René; Ogilvy Berlouis	Mike Hoare; Tullio Moneta

Strength
Unknown troop strength 2 armoured vehicles	53 mercenaries 1 chartered aircraft

Casualties and losses
1 soldier killed 1 police officer wounded 1 armoured vehicle damaged	1 mercenary killed 2 mercenaries wounded 5 mercenaries arrested 1 NIS agent arrested 1 accomplice arrested 1 aircraft disabled
- Approximately 70 people in the airport terminal were taken hostage by the mercenaries. They also hijacked an aircraft with 65 passengers and 13 crew aboard. The aircraft was later relinquished and the hostages were released.

The 1981 Seychelles coup d'état attempt, sometimes referred to as the Seychelles affair or Operation Angela, was a failed South African–orchestrated coup to overthrow the government of Prime Minister France-Albert René in Seychelles and restore the previous president, James Mancham, to power.

The South African government encouraged a mercenary group to force a change of government. Still, the poorly organised and underfunded operation was obstructed when a Seychelles customs official discovered weapons in the baggage of one of the arriving mercenaries and raised the alarm. After an extended firefight, the mercenaries hijacked an aircraft and fled to Durban in South Africa. They were charged in the South African courts but received lenient sentences. United Nations and the South African Truth and Reconciliation Commission enquiries condemned the South African government for their participation in an attempt to overthrow a neighbouring government.

== Background ==
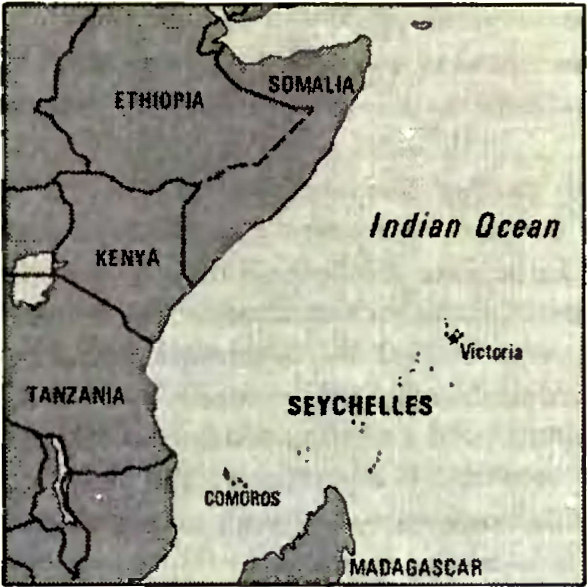
1982 CIA map of East Africa with Seychelles in the center

The Republic of Seychelles achieved independence on 29 June 1976 from the United Kingdom. James Mancham was president and France-Albert René was prime minister, but relations between the two quickly soured. In 1977 René's leftist supporters launched an armed coup while Mancham was in London. Though René denied any responsibility, he assumed the presidency in June. Being a member of the Non-Aligned Movement, the René presidency was considered by the United States to be Marxist in its outlook and favourably disposed towards the Soviet Union. This led to a US-initiated plot against his government in 1979 – the plot was uncovered and resulted in the expulsion of several of the 120 American civilians working at a USAF Satellite Tracking Facility on the main island of Mahe (for economic reasons the station was permitted to remain operational – but the terms of lease were re-negotiated to be more equitable towards the Seychelles). The US Ambassador to Kenya as well as the Chargé d'Affaires in the Seychelles were also implicated in the coup.

Later in 1979, René's party won the elections and he pursued a socialist agenda, upsetting the small but influential middle-class population. His reign also saw the withdrawal of South Africa's landing rights as well as a deterioration of economic ties between the two countries. René frequently warned that sympathizers of the old government were conspiring to use mercenaries to stage a counter-coup. Most of his critics dismissed the alleged plots as exaggerated or even fabricated excuses to jail political opponents.

In 1978 the deposed Mancham approached the South African government through Seychelles exiles to garner support for a counter-coup. The South African government was willing to assist and set aside a small number of special forces for a plot, but directed Mancham's representative to Mike Hoare and a South African government front company called Longreach. "Mad" Mike Hoare had served as a mercenary during the Congo Crisis and, at the time, had retired to Hilton, KwaZulu-Natal and was living as a stock broker and investment manager. He agreed to lead the coup.

=== Planning ===
==== South African support ====
South African officials organised the coup under the code name "Operation Angela". As plans developed, an internal struggle emerged between the Defence Intelligence Division (SADF-ID) and the National Intelligence Service (NIS) over which agency would be responsible for the operation. In the end, SADF was given charge of the plot but an NIS agent, Martin Dolinchek, was appointed to be a liaison officer with the task force. Seychellois exiles Gérard Hoarau, Paul Chow, and Edie Camille helped orchestrate the coup plot. Hoare determined that bringing in weapons via boat was, despite its effectiveness, too expensive a method to carry out.

==== Kenyan support ====
Several prominent Kenyan politicians were alleged to have had prior knowledge of the coup, most prominently Attorney General Charles Njonjo, Police Commissioner Ben Gethi, JD Irwin, head of Kenya's Criminal Investigation Department and Andrew Cole, the current 7th Earl of Enniskillen and then owner of Sunbird Aviation, now a part of Air Kenya. Twenty days before the attempt, Gerard Hoarau and Paul Chow were sent to Nairobi to book a Sunbird Aviation Beechcraft Super King Air 200, registration number N 821CA, to transport the exile government to Seychelles from Mombasa. There have also been allegations that Kenya was to play a larger role in the plot. Just prior to the operation, Mike Hoare would tell South African intelligence officer Martin Dolinchek that Kenya had agreed to send "troops and police while the government-in-waiting was assembled in Nairobi". These troops would only arrive in the Sunbird Beechcraft after ‘Mad Mike’ had secured the army barracks, the airport and the radio station, which never came to pass. In the aftermath of the attempt, when Dolinchek was arrested, details of the Sunbird flight were found in his possession. Had Dolinchek not been left behind, perhaps the Kenyan connection would never have surfaced. Kenyan President Daniel arap Moi, then Chair of the OAU was embarrassed by the affair and may have been kept in the dark by Gethi and Njonjo who were both sacked the following year.

==== Recruitment ====
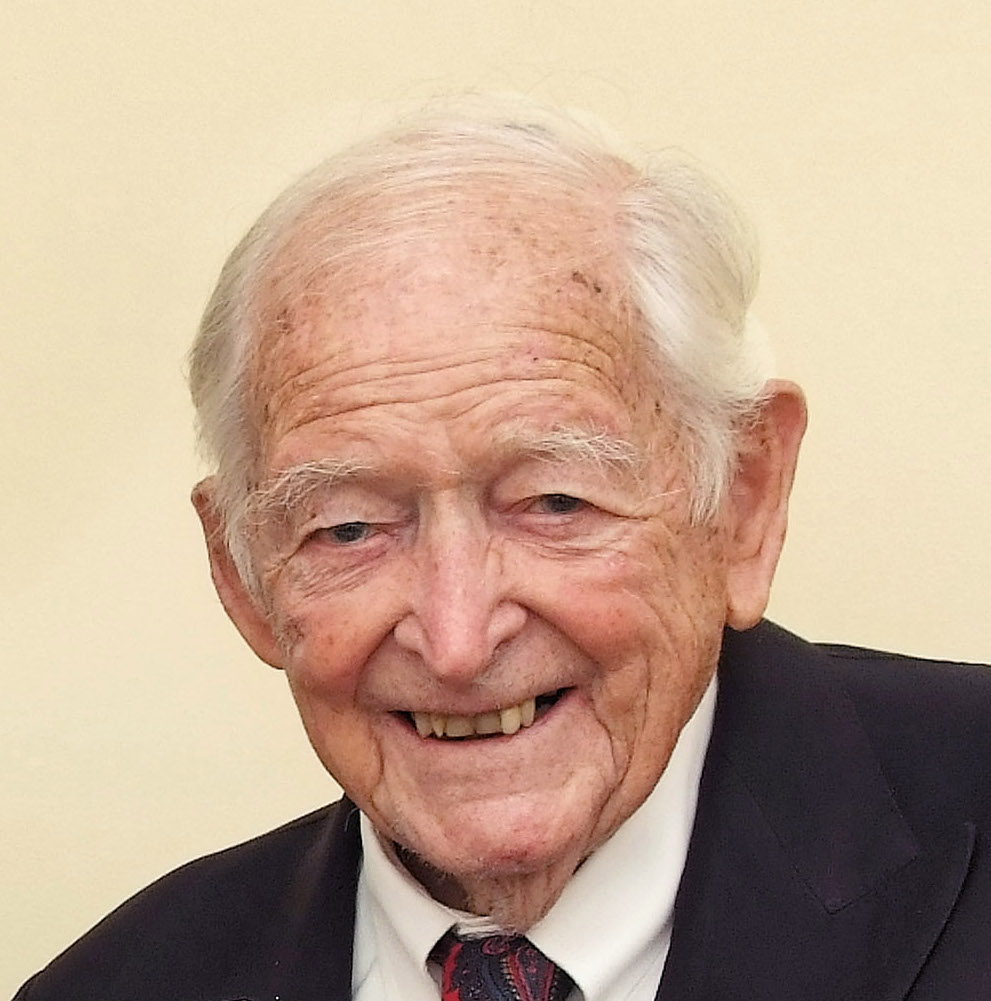
Col. Thomas "Mad Mike" Hoare in 2018 (aged 98)

An article in Gung Ho magazine (Note: A competitor magazine to Soldier of Fortune) edition of May 1981 titled "Mercenary opportunities west of Suez" extolled the benefits and possibilities associated with a mercenary take-over of Seychelles and Mauritius, noting former Seychelles Prime Minister Mancham's support for such an operation. According to the Johannesburg-based Sunday Times newspaper of 29 November 1981, Jim Graves (the editor of Soldier of Fortune magazine) admitted that he had known about a large African mercenary operation being planned and his visit to Johannesburg two days before the attempted coup was "pure coincidence." The word of a large recruitment drive was known in mercenary circles in London, Paris, Johannesburg and Durban.

Hoare managed to assemble a force of 54 mercenaries (himself included). Of these, 27 were members of the South African Defence Force, 9 were ex-Rhodesian soldiers, 7 ex-Congo mercenaries, 1 NIS agent (Dolinchek), and 3 civilians. Hoare also advised that US$5 million be raised for the operation, but only US$300,000 was garnered. The rest of the mercenaries' salaries would come from the Seychelles Treasury.

==== Plan ====
Nine members of Hoare's team were sent to the island of Mahé, Seychelles as an advance team. They were to identify potential targets and rally support from dissident Seychellois soldiers. The rest would arrive on a chartered Royal Swazi National Airways Fokker F-28 in the afternoon of 25 November 1981, disguised as vacationing rugby players and members of a charitable beer drinking club. They took the name of their beer club –Ye Ancient Order of Froth-Blowers (AOFB)– from a London society that had been defunct since the 1930s. As part of their cover, the mercenaries disguised as AOFB members filled their baggage with toys that were to be supposedly distributed to local orphanages. In reality, these were meant to conceal the weight of AK-47 rifles hidden under the false bottoms of each item of luggage. Hoare ensured that the toys were as bulky as possible to best suit the purpose.

The mercenaries plan was to arrive on Mahé, rendezvous with the advance team and disperse around the island to various hotels. They were to wait for several days until René would be holding a cabinet meeting in the Maison du Peuple during which time they would launch their coup. They would seize the parliament, the airport, the radio station, police station, the army camp at Pointe La Rue, and other strategic locations. From the radio station they would broadcast that they had taken power on behalf of Mancham. The Seychellois exiles had assured the mercenaries that they would have the assistance of a 400-strong "local resistance force", but no such force existed.

== Operation ==
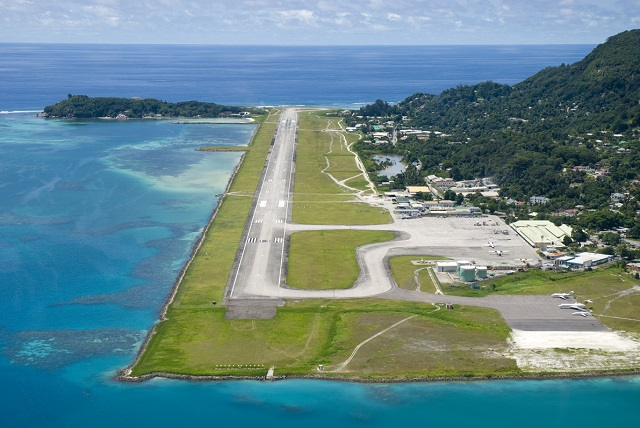
Seychelles International Airport, the site of the abortive coup

At 17:30 on 25 November 1981, Hoare and 43 mercenaries flew into Seychelles International Airport at Pointe La Rue on Mahé. All but two of them had made it through customs when a security supervisor began a thorough search of the luggage of a mercenary, discovering an AK-47. Realising their cover was blown, the mercenaries produced their weapons. One security guard ran towards the office to request assistance and bolted the door, successfully raising the alarm, which led to the beginning of a six-hour gun battle at the airport. About 70 airport staff and passengers were taken hostage by the mercenaries.

President René was in his residence when he received a phone call about the incident at the airport. He immediately put the island on alert, calling all police and militia into service and imposing a 24-hour curfew. Colonel Ogilvy Berlouis, the chief of the Defence Force, was ordered to secure the airport and prevent the mercenaries from escaping.

The number of mercenaries was unknown to the Seychellois, as was the question of whether the attack at the airport was supposed to coincide with a seaborne invasion. Hoare's men erected a roadblock on the north end of the airport and mounted an unsuccessful attack on the Pointe La Rue Barracks in which one mercenary was wounded. Seychellois forces, with two armoured vehicles, occupied the airstrip, confining the mercenaries to the airport's buildings. They also fired upon the chartered aircraft, disabling it. One of the armoured vehicles made its way to the terminal forecourt, but the lights were out in the building and the driver had difficulty spotting the mercenaries. The vehicle's tires were quickly shot out and it was set ablaze by a Molotov cocktail. 2nd Lieutenant David Antat, the vehicle's commander, emerged from the top and engaged the mercenaries. They surrounded the vehicle and shot Antat several times in the chest, killing him.

While the fighting was underway, Air India Flight 224 (a Boeing 707) en route from Salisbury (now Harare) to Bombay (now Mumbai) carrying 13 crew and 65 passengers closed in to land for a scheduled refuelling. The mercenaries, having just seized the control tower, gave permission for it to land. Berlouis was afraid that the plane might be carrying mercenary reinforcements and he thus ordered trucks to be used to block the runway while flares were fired to direct the pilot to abort the landing. At that point the plane was too committed to the landing and proceeded to land and despite the lack of runway lighting, the pilot managed to manoeuvre the aircraft to avoid the trucks, only sustaining superficial damage to its right wing.

Seychellois forces then began firing in the direction of the Boeing, spreading worry among some of the mercenaries who saw the aircraft as their only means of escape. The mercenaries then boarded the flight and the operational leader, Peter Duffy, instructed Captain Umesh Saxena to take them to Zimbabwe. After an argument regarding the lack of fuel, Saxena agreed to fly them to the nearer city of Durban, South Africa.

The advance team of five mercenaries, NIS agent Dolinchek (under the alias Anton Lubic) and one female civilian accomplice were subsequently arrested. Out of the total coup force, one mercenary was killed (SADF 2 Recce member Johan Fritz) and two wounded. One Seychellois soldier was killed and a police sergeant was wounded.

== Aftermath ==
=== Arrests, charges and sentences ===
==== Treason charges in Seychelles ====
Of the five mercenaries who had been arrested and charged in Seychelles, four (Rhodesian Aubrey Brooks, South African Jerry Puren and Britons Bernard Carey and Roger England) were sentenced to death for treason on 6 July 1982. Martin Dolinchek was also found guilty of treason and was sentenced to twenty years imprisonment for indirect participation in the coup attempt. Robert Sims, (Note: Simms was the brother-in-law of Mike Hoare) the fifth mercenary was sentenced to ten years imprisonment on charges related to smuggling arms into the Seychelles. Charges were dropped against Susan Ingles (47), Sims' common law wife who had been arrested and was subsequently released. After extended negotiations between the Seychelles and South African governments and a US$3.0 million payment directly to President René – all six prisoners were pardoned by René and deported to South Africa in mid-1983.

==== Mercenary trial in South Africa ====
Mike Hoare and the mercenaries who had fled to Durban were arrested on landing in Durban. Surprisingly, they were not charged for having attempted a military coup in a foreign country but rather under the Civil Aviation Offences Act on relatively minor charges related to the Air India aircraft. Five were charged and released under bail, while the other mercenaries were released without charge. During the course of the proceedings and charges, General Magnus Malan in his capacity as Minister of Defence, invoked Section 29(1) of the General Laws Amendment Act barring twenty-five of the accused and/or witnesses (all of whom were current or reserve members of the SADF) from giving evidence on matters concerning their involvement in SADF operations prior to 24 November 1981. Without their testimony, only eight of the forty-three accused were charged. All other mercenaries had their charges dropped and were released The international response was swift and vitriolic, considering South Africa had been a strong vocal opponent of terrorism, including air piracy and it is also a signatory to many conventions on hijacking. South African law is harsh in this regard, with a mandatory five-year minimum prison sentence for hijacking. Under sustained international pressure – the entire group of 44 mercenaries was again charged with air piracy on 5 January 1982. International and local press immediately commented that the charges may be a sham – as South African law defined a hijacking as an event that takes place once the aircraft doors have been closed and the aircraft is under direct command of the captain. As the decision was made to divert the aircraft to Durban before the "hijackers" embarked onto the aircraft, this was not considered to be air piracy, but rather a political crime that had taken pace on Seychelles territory and that should be ruled on by Seychelles courts. This was unlikely to happen as South Africa had no extradition treaty with Seychelles.

After a five-month trial, Provincial Supreme Court Judge Neville James absolved the South African government and Prime Minister Pieter W. Botha of complicity in the coup attempt as had been alleged by the mercenaries. The sentences finally passed in July 1982 were:

- Mike Hoare was sentenced to ten years imprisonment: The judge, Justice Neville James told the court that Hoare, was "an unscrupulous man with a highly cavalier attitude to the truth." He was released from prison in May 1985 after serving three of his ten-year sentence, under a general amnesty announced in December 1984 by President Pieter W. Botha.
- Briton Peter Duffy (40), and South Africans Tullio Moneta (32) and Pieter Doorewaard (28) were sentenced to five years imprisonment.
- Briton Michael Webb (32), Kenneth Dalgleish (32), of South Africa and Zimbabwean Charles Goatley (27) were sentenced to two years imprisonment;
- South African, Vernon Prinsloo (31) was given five-year terms on each of two charges against him, but would serve an effective 12 months in jail;
- The remaining 34 prisoners were charged with endangering the safety of an Air India aircraft and they were sentenced to five years imprisonment of which four years were suspended in each case. The men were effectively jailed for 6-month prison terms and released after four months for good conduct; (Note: Details of the full mercenary "Frothblower team" are listed in Независимая Африка. Катанга. Конго. Биафра. Родезия (Eng: Independent Africa. Katanga. Congo. Biafra. Rhodesia.))
- Two of the 45 who flew to Durban after the coup bid, turned state's witness (South Africans, Steyn de Wet and Theodorus van Huysteen). American, Charles William Dukes was wounded during the action at the Seychelles airport and was loaded onto the aircraft in a sedated state. He was deemed to have not participated in the hijacking and was released without charge.

==== Muzzling of the press ====
Three journalists were found guilty of violating the Official Secrets Act for reporting that South Africa's secret service was involved in the aborted coup. Rex Gibson, editor of the English-language Rand Daily Mail; Tertius Myburgh, editor of the Sunday Times; and Eugene Hugo, a reporter for South African Associated Newspapers were fined between $270 to $720, but the fines were suspended.

=== South African government's involvement ===
Prime Minister P.W. Botha stated that the attempted coup was carried out without the knowledge of the South African Government, the Cabinet or the State Security Council and he also stated that no authorisation for the coup had been given by any of these entities. Also, the judge of the Pietermaritzburg hijack-trial concluded that the South African government was not involved in the coup. The UN Commission instituted under Resolution 495 revealed that the South African government had issued military mobilisation orders for forty-three of the mercenaries who were either serving in- or were reservist SADF soldiers. The South African government also refused to grant the UN Commission access to any of the mercenaries and it also prevented any interviews from being conducted with them.

Mike Hoare said that the South African Cabinet and top ranking NIS and SADF officers knew about the abortive coup and condoned it. Martin Dolinchek (alias Anton Lubic) declared that his department (NIS) and the SADF had full and prior knowledge of the coup plans and they were presented to the South African Government in 1979 and rejected, only to be accepted in 1980. He stated that logistical support was given by the South African Defence Force with them providing AK-47 assault rifles, ammunition and grenades and further arranging for the other weapons to be available on the island). Further, Dolinchek had travelled to the Seychelles on a government issued South African passport in the name of 'Anton Lubic'. He claimed the passport was issued to him on 12 October 1981 by the Department of the Interior in Durban. This was confirmed by the South African government to the United Nations inquiry into the abortive coup.

=== Kenyan involvement ===
Dolinchek told his captors in Seychelles that "..a new government was to be flown in from Kenya and that the Kenyan government had further agreed to provide two aircraft to fly in troops and police to support the new government and to supplement the mercenary force." Seychellois police found a document among Dolinchek's belongings that showed flight times for a Beechcraft Super Kingair 2000 that was scheduled to fly to Comoros on 24 November 1981 from Mombasa. Then it would fly back to Mombasa to take off again on 26 November to the Seychelles. Under questioning, Dolinchek filled in details that the charter plane from Mombasa would be carrying James Mancham, his wife and three colleagues ready to retake power in Seychelles. With them, Dolinchek added, would be Kenyan military and police reinforcements for the coup.

The Kenyan government strongly denied any such involvement once this statement was made public. The denial was questioned as it was known that Kenyan President Arap Moi was not well disposed towards Seychelles and because Kenya was an active participant in the 1979 Seychelles attempted coup together with the United States.

=== Tanzania involvement ===
Tanzanian troops were helping man airport and coastal defence positions after the coup attempt by mercenaries, Maj. James Michel, the Seychelles Information Minister reported.

Major Michel, who was also Chief of Staff of the Seychelles Defense Forces, said Tanzanian soldiers, who had been training the Seychelles Army since 1977, had almost all gone home before the mercenaries attacked the airport on the main island of Mahe on 25 November.

But right after the attack Tanzania sent combat troops and they are now supplementing our own defence forces at the airport and coastal defence positions to help us counter any future aggressions, Major Michel said. They will stay as long as is needed.

=== United Nations Commission ===
On 15 December 1981, the United Nations Security Council convened a commission of enquiry to investigate the invasion and to report its findings to the Security Council. The commission, composed of Panamanian, Irish and Japanese representatives concluded that "..it was 'hard to believe' South Africa had no prior knowledge of the plot to overthrow the leftist government on the Indian Ocean island." In the second report, the Commission reported that evidence implicating the South African authorities had emerged and said 'it is not now disputed' that Hoare had approached the South African national intelligence service and was referred to members of the defence forces. The panel said it uncovered several other matters 'which it considers clearly established' South African involvement:

- Arms, ammunition and other equipment were supplied by South African Defense Force personnel;
- An (South African) army officer participated in the preliminary discussions;
- The government was generally aware of attempts by Seychelles exiles seeking support to overthrow the Seychelles government; and
- Members of an elite South African commando unit took part in the operation.

=== South Africa Truth and Reconciliation Commission ===
The South Africa Truth and Reconciliation Commission found that:

The commission finds that the attempt to overthrow the Seychelles government was an operation undertaken by senior operatives of the NIS and the Department of Military Intelligence with the collusion of elements within the SADF. As such, it was a violation of international law and an infringement of the sovereignty of the Seychelles government. The death of a Seychellois citizen in the operation was a gross human rights violation.

For these acts, the Commission finds the following to be accountable in their capacities as heads of agencies of the state directly involved in the operation:

- Prime Minister P.W. Botha,
- Minister of Defence General Magnus Malan,
- Head of the office of Chief of Staff Intelligence: Lieutenant General P.W. van der Westhuizen, and
- The National Intelligence Service.

=== Other ===
Mike Hoare later authored a book on the coup attempt, entitled The Seychelles Affair.

After the event, David Antat became a Seychelles national hero.

== See also ==
- History of Seychelles
- 1977 Seychelles coup d'état

== Notes and references ==
=== Bibliography ===
- Arnold, Guy (1999). Mercenaries: Scourge of the Developing World (illustrated ed.). Springer. ISBN 9781349277087.
- Arnold, Guy (2016). Wars in the Third World Since 1945. Bloomsbury Publishing. ISBN 9781474291019.
- Axelrod, Alan (2013). Mercenaries: A Guide to Private Armies and Private Military Companies. CQ Press. ISBN 9781483364667.
- Bailey, Sydney (2016). The UN Security Council and Human Rights (illustrated ed.). Springer. ISBN 9781349237012.
- BBC (1998). "BBC News: On this day 27th July".
- Brooks, Aubrey (2015). Death Row in Paradise: The Untold Story of the Mercenary Invasion of the Seychelles 1981–83 (revised ed.). Helion and Company. ISBN 9781911096771.
- "Captain hosts his hijacker". The Times of India. 13 October 2006.
- Fawthrop, Tom (20 January 1982). "Seychelles coup attempt: as intriguing as a spy thriller". The Christian Science Monitor.
- Greek Ministry of Culture (1986). Seychelles, close to us. Hypourgeio Politismou.
- Mitchell, Charles (14 June 1982). "Mercenaries to stand trial on coup attempt". United Press International.
- Ray, Ellen (1982). "Seychelles beats back mercenaries" (PDF). Covert Action Information Bulletin. 16 (March 1982). Archived from the original (PDF) on 23 January 2017.
- Shillington, Kevin (2014). Albert René: The Father of Modern Seychelles : a Biography. Apollo Books. ISBN 9781742586120.
- TRC (1998). "Truth and Reconciliation Commission of South Africa Report: Volume 2" (PDF). South African Government Printer.
- United Nations (1981). "United Nations Resolution 496 of 15 December 1981 (2,314th meeting)" (PDF). UN Security Council.
- Various (1982). AF Press Clips. Ohio State University.
