= United Nations Security Council Resolution 507 =

UN Security Council Resolution 507
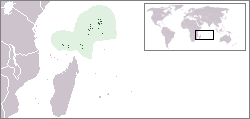
- Seychelles
- Date: 28 May 1982
- Meeting no.: 2,370
- Code: S/RES/507 (Document)
- Subject: Seychelles
- Voting summary: 15 voted for; None voted against; None abstained
- Result: Adopted

Security Council composition
- Permanent members: China; France; Soviet Union; United Kingdom; United States
- Non-permanent members: Guyana; Ireland; Jordan; Japan; Panama; Poland; Spain; Togo; Uganda; Zaire

United Nations Security Council resolution 507, was adopted unanimously on 28 May 1982, after examining a report by the Security Council Commission on the Seychelles adopted in Resolution 496 (1981), the Council expressed its concern at the November 1981 coup attempt in the Seychelles by foreign mercenaries, including Mike Hoare, allegedly backed by South Africa, and the subsequent hijacking of an Air India plane.

The Council went on to strongly condemn the mercenary aggression against the Seychelles and the hijacking, emphasising it stood against external interference in the internal affairs of a Member State. The resolution commended the Seychelles for repelling the attack, reiterating Resolution 239 (1967) against the use of mercenaries to attack another Member State.

The resolution ended by establishing an ad hoc committee chaired by France to oversee development funds to repair the damage to the Seychelles and ensure economic reconstruction. It also requested the Secretary-General assist the fund, and extended the mandate of the inquiry into the events by 15 August 1982.

== See also ==
- 1981 Seychelles coup d'état attempt
- List of United Nations Security Council Resolutions 501 to 600 (1982–1987)
