= INS Nilgiri (F33) =

1966 Nilgiri-class frigate

History

India
- Name: INS Nilgiri
- Namesake: Nilgiri Hills
- Ordered: 1964
- Builder: Mazagon Docks Ltd, Mumbai
- Laid down: October 1966
- Launched: October 1968
- Commissioned: 3 June 1972
- Decommissioned: 1996
- Fate: Sunk in a Sea Eagle AShM test from a carrier-launched Sea Harrier in 1997

General characteristics
- Class & type: Nilgiri-class frigate
- Displacement: 2682 tons (standard); 2962 tons (full load)
- Length: 113 m (371 ft)
- Beam: 13 m (43 ft)
- Draught: 4.3 m (14 ft)
- Propulsion: 2 × 550 psi boilers; 2 × 30,000 hp (22,000 kW) motors
- Speed: 28 knots (52 km/h; 32 mph)
- Range: 4,000 nmi (7,400 km; 4,600 mi) at 12 kn (22 km/h; 14 mph)
- Complement: 267 (incl 17 officers)
- Sensors & processing systems: Signaal DA05 / BEL PFN513 radar; Signaal LW08 / BEL RAWL02 surface radar; Signaal ZW06 / BEL RASHMI navigation radar; Signaal M-45 navigation radar; Westinghouse SQS-505 / Graesby 750 sonar; Type 170 active attack sonar
- Armament: 2 × MK.6 Vickers 115 mm guns; 4 × AK-230 30 mm guns; 2 × Oerlikon 20 mm guns; 2 × triple ILAS 3 324 mm torpedo tubes with Whitehead A244S or the Indian NST-58 torpedoes
- Aircraft carried: 1 HAL Chetak

INS Nilgiri (F33) was the lead ship of her class of frigates. Commissioned on 3 June 1972 into the Indian Navy, she was decommissioned in 1996.

INS Nilgiri was the first major warship built in India keel up, with a displacement ~20x that of an Ajay class patrol vessel. INS Nilgiri was built at Mazagon Docks Limited, Mumbai in collaboration with Yarrow Shipbuilders, Glasgow. The collaboration involved designs of the Royal Navy's improved Type 12 general purpose frigate and technical and training support for construction of 6 vessels. The project to build Nilgiri was led by Homi Sethna and Commander (later Rear Admiral) Prakash N Gour. The success of Nilgiri led to the Indian Navy along with Mazagon Docks redesigning the last two ships of the class – INS Vindhyagiri and INS Taragiri to add the Sea King helicopter, ILAS 324 mm torpedo tubes and Bofors ASW rocket launcher.

The ship was fitted with the Agouti system to minimize propeller cavitation noise.

== Decommissioning ==
INS Nilgiri was decommissioned in 1996. She was sunk on 24 April 1997, in a test firing of a Sea Eagle anti-ship missile by a Sea Harrier Frs Mk.51 taking off from the aircraft carrier INS Viraat.
