= Sunbird Aviation =

Kenyan airline

IATA	ICAO	Call sign
-	-	-
- Ceased operations: 1987 (merged with Airkenya to form Airkenya Express
- Fleet size: 2 w/o
- Key people: Cole Family

Sunbird Aviation was an airline in Kenya which merged with Air Kenya in 1987 to form Airkenya Aviation. The airline Sunbird Charters was started by Anthony Lutyens in 1970 and sold to Andrew Cole [Lord of Enniskillen] when Anthony emigrated to New Zealand.

== Accidents and incidents ==
- One of Sunbird's aircraft, a Beechcraft Super King Air 200, registration number N 821CA was intended to transport the exile government of James Mancham as well as Kenyan military support from Mombasa following the failed 1981 Seychelles coup d'état attempt.
- On 15 August 1987, Douglas DC-3 5Y-DAK crashed on approach to Kilaguni Airport. All 28 people on board survived.
