= INS Nirghat =

The following ships of the Indian Navy have been named INS Nirghat:

- INS Nirghat (K89) was a Vidyut-class missile boat of the Indian Navy which served in the Indo-Pakistani War of 1971
- INS Nirghat (K44) is a Veer-class corvette, decommissioned.
