= HMIS Clive =

History
- Name: Clive
- Builder: William Beardmore and Company
- Launched: 10 December 1919
- Commissioned: 20 April 1920
- Decommissioned: 1947
- Fate: Scrapped 1947

General characteristics
- Displacement: 2,050 long tons (2,083 t) standard
- Length: 240 ft (73 m) p/p; 270 ft 8 in (82.50 m) o/a
- Beam: 38 ft 6 in (11.73 m)
- Draught: 10 ft 4 in (3.15 m)
- Installed power: 1,700 shp (1,300 kW)
- Propulsion: Geared steam turbines, 2 Babcock & Wilcox boilers; 2 shafts
- Speed: 14.5 knots (16.7 mph; 26.9 km/h)
- Complement: 111
- Armament: 2 × 4 in (100 mm) guns; 2 × 2-pounder pom-poms

HMIS Clive (L79) was a sloop, commissioned in 1920 into the Royal Indian Marine (RIM).

She served during World War II in the Royal Indian Navy (RIN), the successor to the RIM. Her pennant number was changed to U79 in 1940. Although originally built as a minesweeper, she was primarily used as a convoy escort during the war. She was scrapped soon after the end of the war.

== History ==
HMIS Clive was ordered under the Emergency War Programme of World War I, she was completed after the end of the war. During World War II, she was a part of the Eastern Fleet. She escorted numerous convoys in the Indian Ocean 1942−1945. She was decommissioned and scrapped in 1947, soon after the end of the war.
