= Tullio Moneta =

Italian actor and mercenary (1937–2022)

- Born: 9 May 1937; Rijeka
- Died: March 31, 2022 (aged 84); Durban, South Africa
- Citizenship: South Africa, Italy
- Occupations: Actor, Television actor, Mercenary

Tullio Moneta (9 May 1937 – 31 March 2022) was an Italian-South African actor and mercenary. He acted in 15 films between 1970 and 1990, starring in the feature film The Lion's Share. He also played a role in the Afrikaans language film Aanslag op Kariba (which means attack on (the) Kariba (dam)) in 1973, produced by Brigadiers Films. He was, together with Mike Hoare, the military advisor for the film The Wild Geese (1978).

In November 1981 Moneta was second-in-command to Mike Hoare when the latter led the 1981 Seychelles coup d'état attempt at Mahe Airport in the Seychelles and was sentenced to five years in prison; he was released soon after.

Moneta latterly lived in Durban, South Africa. He died on 31 March 2022, at the age of 84.
