= Indian Ocean Station =

The Indian Ocean Station (IOS) was a US Air Force Satellite Control Network (AFSCN) tracking station that operated in the Seychelles islands from 1963 until 1996. When the station opened it marked the start of an official American military presence in Seychelles.

== Sites ==
The station was made up of the following sites:

=== Technical site ===
The technical site was located off the top of La Misere Road. It housed the one 60-foot antenna used to support telemetry, tracking and commanding for satellites. This antenna was housed within a radome, which resembled a large golf ball when viewed from a distance. In later years a second antenna with radome was added; this antenna supported communications with the US via satellite. The technical site fell into disrepair and was subsequently used for a residence for Sheikh Khalifa, the President of the United Arab Emirates. The building of the residence generated local controversy.

=== Transmitter site ===
The transmitter site was located north of Grand Anse.

=== Receiver site ===
The receiver site was located near Souvenir Estate. The station Commander's house was located nearby.

=== Housing site ===
The housing site included housing, dining and other support facilities for station staff. The housing site subsequently became the site for the Seychelles Tourism Academy.

== Commemoration ==
IOS celebrated its 25 anniversary in 1988. Although the station had been closed since 1996, former IOS staff organized a 50th anniversary reunion in June-July 2013, covered in the local media.
