= German submarine U-83 =

U-83 may refer to one of the following German submarines:

- SM U-83, a Type U 81 submarine launched in 1916 and that served in the First World War until sunk on 17 February 1917
  - During the First World War, Germany also had this submarine with a similar name:
    - SM UB-83, a Type UB III submarine launched in 1917 and sunk on 10 September 1918
- German submarine U-83 (1941), a Type VIIB submarine that served in the Second World War until sunk on 4 March 1943
