= HMIS Lawrence =

History
- Name: Lawrence
- Builder: William Beardmore and Company
- Launched: 30 July 1919
- Commissioned: 27 December 1919
- Decommissioned: 1947
- Fate: Scrapped 1947

General characteristics
- Displacement: 1,225 long tons (1,245 t) standard
- Length: 225 ft (69 m) p/p; 248 ft 6 in (75.74 m) o/a
- Beam: 34 ft (10 m)
- Draught: 8 ft 9 in (2.67 m)
- Installed power: 1,900 shp (1,400 kW)
- Propulsion: Geared steam turbines, 2 Babcock boilers; 2 shafts
- Speed: 15 knots (17 mph; 28 km/h)
- Complement: 97
- Armament: 2 × 4 in (100 mm) guns; 1 × 2-pounder pom-pom

HMIS Lawrence (L83) was a sloop, commissioned in 1919 into the Royal Indian Marine (RIM).

She served during World War II in the Royal Indian Navy (RIN), the successor to the RIM. Her pennant number was changed to U83 in 1940. Although originally built as a minesweeper, she was primarily used as a convoy escort during the war. She was scrapped soon after the end of the war.

== History ==
HMIS Lawrence was ordered under the Emergency War Programme of the First World War, being launched at William Beardmore and Company on 30 July 1919 and completed on 27 December 1919. In the immediate post-war years, Lawrence was used by the Royal Indian Marine for servicing buoys and lighthouses and as a transport for high officials in the Persian Gulf.

In 1925 while conducting anti-slavery patrols the ship conducted a bombardment of Fujairah Fort, destroying three of the forts towers.

On the outbreak of the Second World War, the Lawrence, whose armament had been increased by the addition of four 3-pounder guns and a second 2-pounder pom-pom, deployed to Masirah Island off the coast of Oman where it was used to carry out patrols, taking part in the unsuccessful search for the missing airliner Hannibal in March 1940.

Immediately prior to the outbreak of the Anglo-Iraqi War, Lawrence helped to cover the landing of the 20th Indian Infantry Brigade at Basra on 18 April 1941. When Britain and the Soviet Union invaded Iran in August 1941, Lawrence took part in the attack on Abadan on 25 August 1941, boarding and capturing the Iranian gunboats Karkas and Shahbaaz and two Italian merchant ships.

In late 1944 Lawrence was assigned to HMIS Himalaya, the Gunnery school in Karachi as a Gunnery School Firing Ship, and joined the Bombay training squadron in November 1945.

Lawrence was decommissioned and scrapped in 1947, two years after the end of the war.
