= INS Himgiri (F34) =

Nilgiri-class frigate of the Indian Navy

History

India
- Name: INS Himgiri
- Namesake: Himgiri Range
- Launched: 6 May 1970
- Commissioned: 23 November 1974
- Decommissioned: 6 May 2005
- Fate: Decommissioned

General characteristics
- Class & type: Nilgiri-class frigate
- Displacement: 2682 tons (standard); 2962 tons (full load)
- Length: 113 m (371 ft)
- Beam: 13 m (43 ft)
- Draught: 4.3 m (14 ft)
- Propulsion: 2 × 550 psi boilers; 2 × 30,000 hp (22,000 kW) motors
- Speed: 28 knots (52 km/h; 32 mph)
- Range: 4,000 nmi (7,400 km; 4,600 mi) at 12 kn (22 km/h; 14 mph)
- Complement: 267 (incl 17 officers)
- Sensors & processing systems: Signaal DA05 / BEL PFN513 radar; Signaal LW08 / BEL RAWL02 surface radar; Signaal ZW06 / BEL RASHMI navigation radar; Signaal M-45 navigation radar; Westinghouse SQS-505 / Graesby 750 sonar; Type 170 active attack sonar
- Armament: 2 × MK.6 Vickers 115 mm guns; 4 × AK-230 30 mm guns; 2 × Oerlikon 20 mm guns; 2 × triple ILAS 3 324 mm torpedo tubes with Whitehead A244S or the Indian NST-58 torpedoes
- Aircraft carried: 1 Westland Sea King or HAL Chetak

INS Himgiri (F34) was a Nilgiri-class frigate of the Indian Navy. Himgiri was commissioned into the Navy on 23 November 1974. She was decommissioned on 6 May 2005.

A new ship with this name belonging to the new Nilgiri class was launched in December 2020.

== Operations ==
INS Himgiri holds the record for the number of days at sea in a single deployment for a conventional ship of the Indian Navy. In 1976, she was the first ship of the Indian Navy to shoot down a pilotless aircraft.
