= INS Udaygiri (F35) =

1972 Nilgiri-class frigate

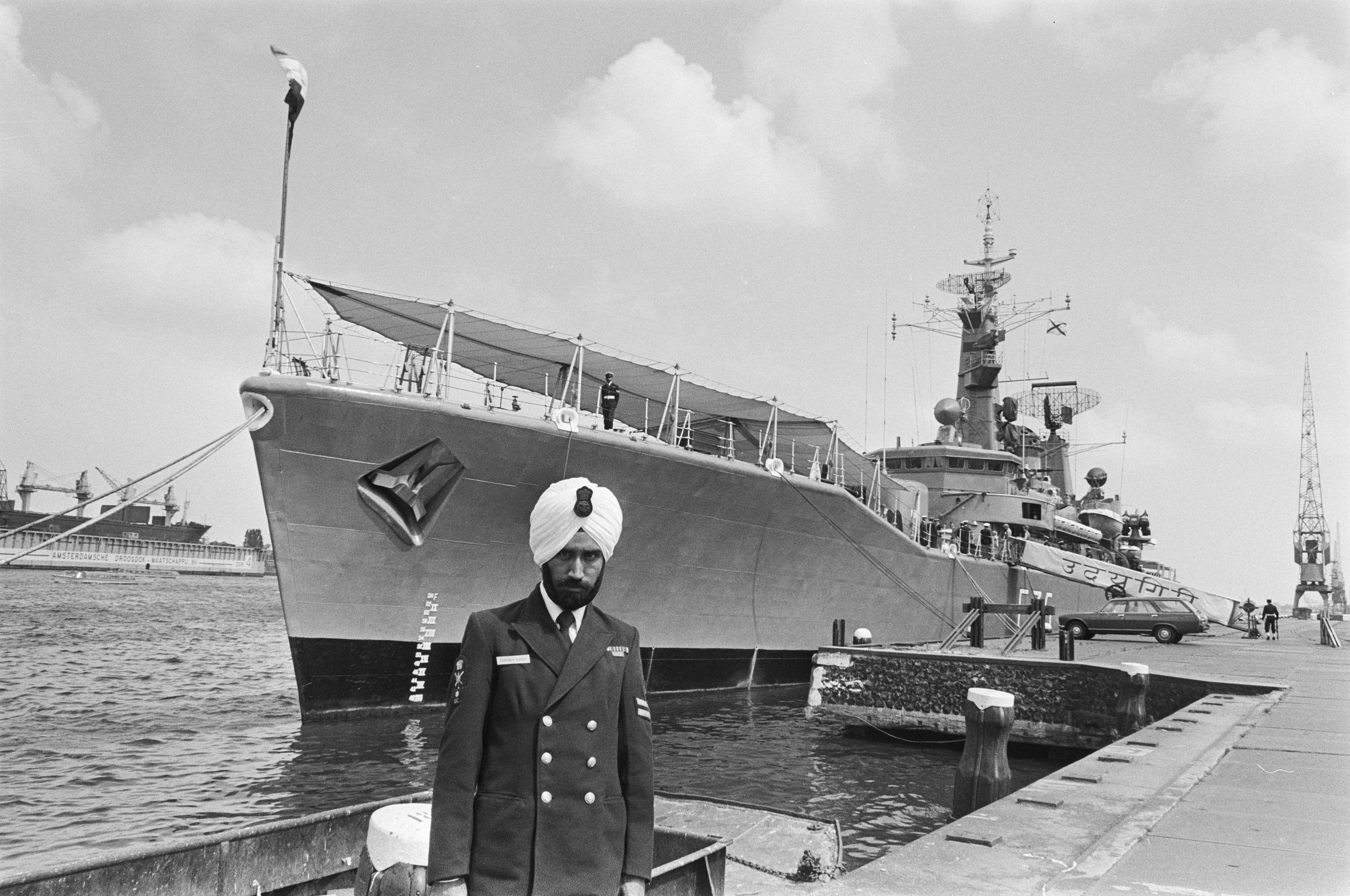
- INS Udaygiri in Amsterdam on 8 July 1977

History

India
- Name: INS Udaygiri
- Launched: 24 October 1972
- Commissioned: 18 February 1976
- Decommissioned: 24 August 2007
- Fate: Decommissioned

General characteristics
- Class & type: Nilgiri-class frigate
- Displacement: 2682 tons (standard); 2962 tons (full load)
- Length: 113 m (371 ft)
- Beam: 13 m (43 ft)
- Draught: 4.3 m (14 ft)
- Propulsion: 2 × 550 psi boilers; 2 × 30,000 hp (22,000 kW) motors
- Speed: 28 knots (52 km/h; 32 mph)
- Range: 4,000 nmi (7,400 km; 4,600 mi) at 12 knots (22 km/h; 14 mph)
- Complement: 267 (incl 17 officers)
- Sensors & processing systems: Signaal DA05 / BEL PFN513 radar; Signaal LW08 / BEL RAWL02 surface radar; Signaal ZW06 / BEL RASHMI navigation radar; Signaal M-45 navigation radar; Westinghouse SQS-505 / Graesby 750 sonar; Type 170 active attack sonar
- Armament: 2 × MK.6 Vickers 115 mm guns; 4 × AK-230 30 mm guns; 2 × Oerlikon 20 mm guns; 2 × triple ILAS 3 324 mm torpedo tubes with Whitehead A244S or the Indian NST-58 torpedoes
- Aircraft carried: 1 Westland Sea King or HAL Chetak

INS Udaygiri (F35) was a Nilgiri-class frigate of the Indian Navy. Udaygiri was commissioned into the Navy on 18 February 1976. She was decommissioned on 24 August 2007.

== Operations ==
The ship took part in the fleet review held in UK commemorating the Silver Jubilee of Elizabeth II in 1977. The fleet review also included HMS Hermes which was later sold to the Indian Navy as INS Viraat.
