= Ogilvy Berlouis =

Seychellois politician (1950–2018)

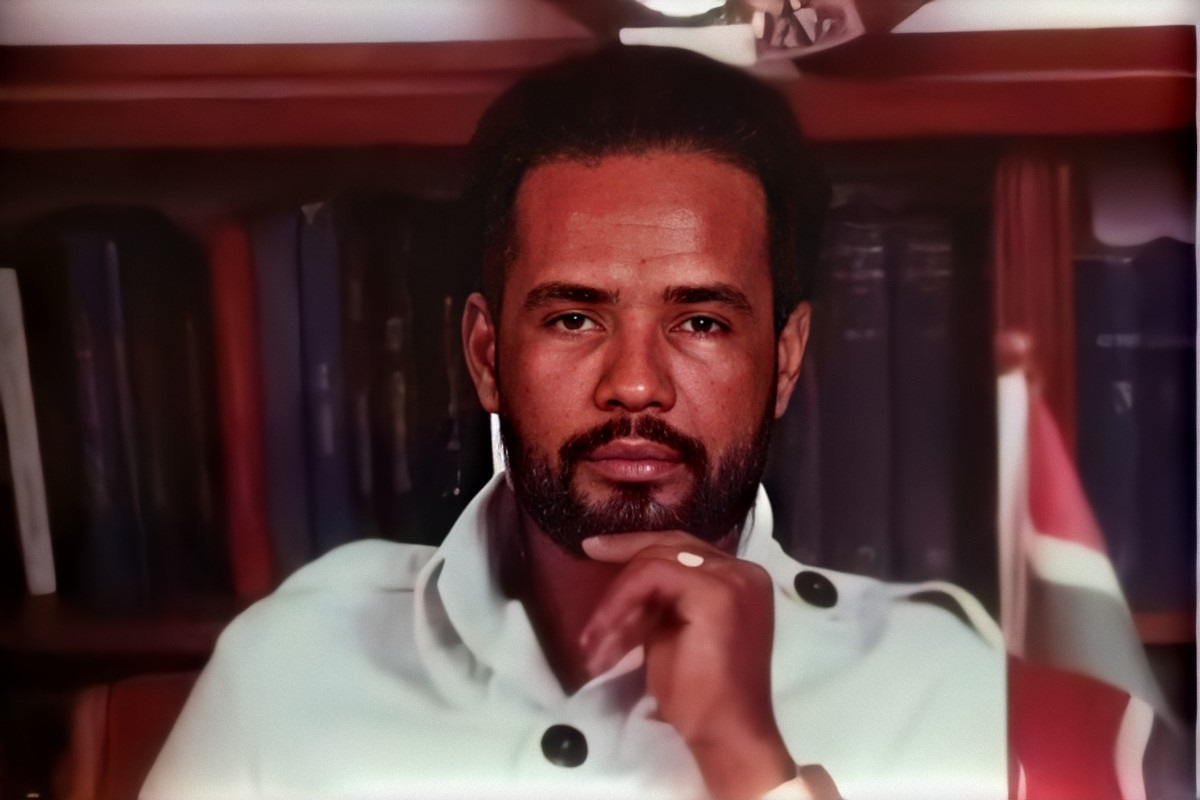

Minister of Defence and Youth of Seychelles Chief of Defence Forces
- In office 26 March 1979 – 11 September 1986
- President: France-Albert René

Minister of Home Affairs of Seychelles
- In office 5 June 1977 – 26 March 1979
- President: France-Albert René

Personal details
- Born: 22 August 1950 Seychelles
- Died: 3 April 2018 (aged 67) Victoria, Seychelles
- Party: Seychelles People's Progressive Front; Seychelles Liberal Party

Ogilvy Berlouis (22 August 1950 – 3 April 2018) was the first Minister of Home Affairs of Seychelles, which he held from 1977 until 1979. He was also the Minister of Defence and Youth of Seychelles and the Chief of Defence Forces of Seychelles from 1979 until his forced resignation by President France-Albert René in 1986.
