= INS Vindhyagiri (F42) =

Decommissioned Nilgiri-class frigate of the Indian Navy

History

India
- Name: INS Vindhyagiri
- Namesake: Vindhyagiri Hill
- Launched: 12 November 1977
- Commissioned: 8 July 1981
- Decommissioned: 11 June 2012
- Identification: Pennant number: F42
- Honours and awards: Served as flagship of Western Fleet
- Fate: Capsized after collision, 2011
- Status: Salvaged and decommissioned

General characteristics
- Class & type: Nilgiri-class frigate
- Displacement: 2682 tons (standard); 2962 tons (full load)
- Length: 113 m (371 ft)
- Beam: 13 m (43 ft)
- Draught: 4.3 m (14 ft)
- Propulsion: 2 × 550 psi boilers; 2 × 30,000 hp motors
- Speed: 28 kn (52 km/h; 32 mph)
- Range: 4,000 nmi (7,400 km; 4,600 mi) @ 12 kn (22 km/h; 14 mph)
- Complement: 267 (incl 17 officers)
- Sensors & processing systems: Signaal DA05 / BEL PFN513 radar; Signaal LW08 / BEL RAWL02 surface radar; Signaal ZW06 / BEL RASHMI navigation radar; Signaal M-45 navigation radar; Westinghouse SQS-505 / Graesby 750 sonar; Type 170 active attack sonar
- Armament: 2 × MK.6 Vickers 115mm guns; 4 × AK-230 30mm guns; 2 × Oerlikon 20mm guns; 2 × triple ILAS 3 324 mm torpedo tubes with Whitehead A244S or the Indian NST-58 torpedoes; 1 × twin-tube launcher for Bofors 375mm anti submarine rockets
- Aircraft carried: 1 Westland Sea King or HAL Chetak

INS Vindhyagiri was a Nilgiri-class frigate of the Indian Navy. Vindhyagiri was commissioned on 8 July 1981. After nearly thirty years of service, she sank a few hours after colliding with a German merchant vessel on 30 January 2011. Although she was subsequently salvaged, the navy decommissioned her on 11 June 2012, a year before her envisaged decommissioning date. Vindhyagiri served for 31 years, including a period as the flagship of the Western Naval Command.

== Role in Seychelles coup attempt ==
In 1986, there was a series of coup attempts against President René led by the Seychelles Minister of Defence, Ogilvy Berlouis. This included a plot in June 1986, codenamed Operation Distant Lash, which involved some 30 mercenaries and 350 Seychellois.

When New Delhi was informed of an impending coup by intelligence sources, Prime Minister Rajiv Gandhi personally contacted the Indian Chief of Naval Staff, Admiral Radhakrishna Hariram Tahiliani, with a verbal request to provide assistance to René. Coincidentally, the Indian Navy had already dispatched the Vindhyagiri on a scheduled visit to Seychelles. It was decided that on arrival Vindhyagiri would report an engineering defect requiring an extended stay in Port Victoria. A senior Indian naval officer was then sent to the Seychelles on a commercial airline to command the operation and an "engineering" team of 20 sailors trained in weapons was readied for dispatch to Port Victoria. The extended presence of the Vindhyagiri in Port Victoria averted the planned coup.

== January 2011 collision ==
On 30 January 2011, Vindhyagiri collided with the Cyprus-flagged MV Nordlake near Sunk Rock lighthouse at the entrance of Mumbai harbour at 3:30 pm. Several civilians, including family members of the crew, were on board at the time of the incident. No casualties were reported. The collision caused major damage in the hull of the ship, affecting the boiler room and turbine room. The collision also caused a major fire to break out, which took more than 15 hours to control.

On 31 January 2011, Vindhyagiri settled on the sea bed at Berth No 5 the Mumbai Naval Dockyard due to flooding in some of its compartments from the collision and fire.

Chief Public Relations Officer (Defence) Captain M. Nambiar told The Hindu newspaper that: "The place where the ship is berthed hardly has enough water. It is just seven metres deep. The ship touched the bottom because of flooding in some compartments. She is on the sea bed. Of course, she can be recovered."

After spending close to five months on the seabed, the ship was raised by the Titan Salvage company, with the assistance of the naval architect firm Salvage Master and a 24-hour diving crew. The procedure started with patches to the hull, followed by using multiple pumps to remove the water from inside the wreck, all while a giant floating crane lifted the wreck and kept it stable while the salvage crew performed their work.

== Decommissioning ==
On 8 May 2012, the Bombay High Court granted permission to the Indian Navy to decommission and destroy the ship after one ammunition chamber could not be emptied. It was due to be expended as a target. The ship was decommissioned subsequently on 11 June 2012.
