= Nilgiri-class frigate (1972) =

1972 subclass of British Leander-class frigates

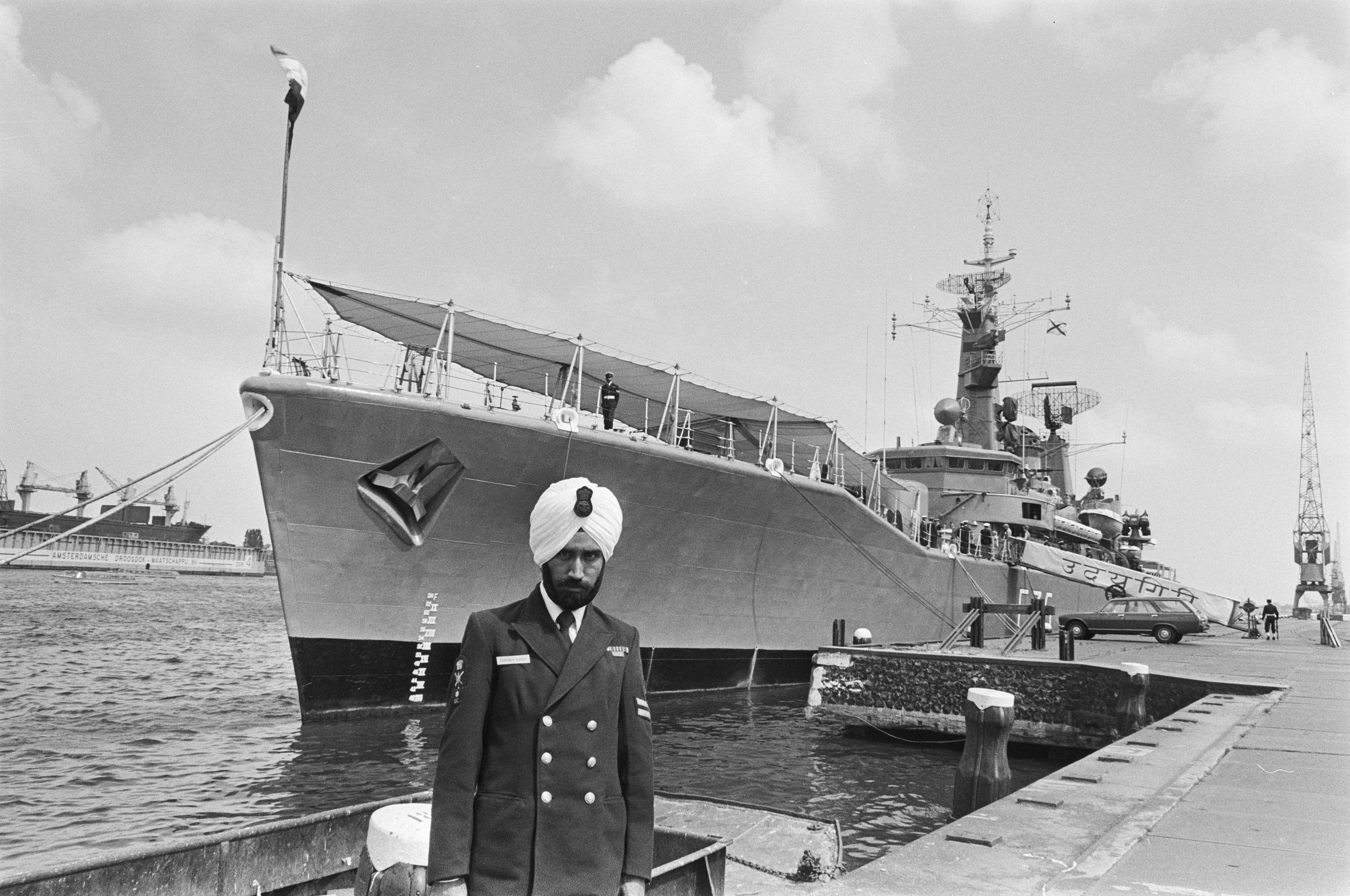
- INS Udaygiri (F35) in Amsterdam on 8 July 1977

Class overview
- Name: Nilgiri class
- Builders: Mazagon Dock Limited
- Operators: Indian Navy
- Preceded by: Blackwood-class frigate; Whitby-class frigate; Leopard-class frigate
- Succeeded by: Godavari-class frigate
- Built: 1966 – 1981
- In commission: 1972 – 2013
- Completed: 6
- Retired: 6 (INS Vindhyagiri was sunk but salvaged and later retired)

General characteristics
- Type: Frigate
- Displacement: 2,682 tons (standard); 2,962 tons (full load)
- Length: 113 m (371 ft)
- Beam: 13 m (43 ft)
- Draught: 4.3 m (14 ft)
- Propulsion: 2 × 550 psi (3,800 kPa) boilers; 2 × 30,000 hp motors
- Speed: 28 kn (52 km/h; 32 mph)
- Range: 4,000 nmi (7,400 km; 4,600 mi) at 12 kn (22 km/h; 14 mph)
- Complement: 267 (incl 17 officers)
- Sensors & processing systems: Signaal DA05 / BEL PFN513 radar; Signaal LW08 / BEL RAWL02 surface radar; Signaal ZW06 / BEL RASHMI navigation radar; Signaal M-45 navigation radar; Westinghouse SQS-505 / Graesby 750 sonar 184M; Type 170 active attack sonar; Type 903 radar (MRS-3 system)
- Armament: 2 × MK.6 Vickers 113mm guns; 2 × AK-230 twin 30 mm anti-aircraft guns; 2 × Oerlikon 20mm guns; 2 × triple ILAS 3 324 mm torpedo tubes with Whitehead A244S or the Indian NST-58 torpedoes; 1 × twin-tube launcher for Bofors 375mm anti submarine rockets (in INS Vindhyagiri and INS Taragiri only)
- Aircraft carried: 1 Westland Sea King or HAL Chetak

The Nilgiri-class frigates were updated versions of the Leander class, designed and built for the Indian Navy by Mazagon Dock Limited in Mumbai. Six ships were built between 1972–81. Vessels of the class formed the 14th Frigate Squadron. The lead ship INS Nilgiri was the first major warship to be built in India and was built in collaboration with Yarrow Shipbuilders of the United Kingdom.

The class and its lead ship, INS Nilgiri are named for the Nilgiri Hills. Subsequent ships in the class are also named for hill ranges of India.

When the British refused to provide license production of the radar suite, the Indian Navy teamed up with Signaal of Netherlands to license-build a similar radar search, tracking and fire control suite in India, which went into the latter five ships. Improved versions of the Signaal search radar continues to be fitted in later classes of Indian Navy ships. As delivered, the ships carried British Seacat quadruple SAM launchers (one in INS Nilgiri, two in the rest) and the first four ships had Limbo anti-submarine mortars. The Seacats were later replaced by Russian AK-230 twin 30mm anti-aircraft guns, and the Limbo by ILAS 324 mm triple torpedo tubes.

The last two ships, INS Vindhyagiri and INS Taragiri were modified significantly with the addition of a Sea King ASW helicopter, a collapsible Canadian hangar, ILAS 324 mm triple torpedo tubes and a twin-tube launcher for Bofors 375mm anti submarine rockets. This re-design was done indigenously by the Indian Navy and gave it much needed experience and confidence in ship-design and modification. They were also fitted with an indigenous ASW fire control action information system which was a first for the Indian electronics industry. This project was led by Captain (later Rear Admiral) Prakash N Gour. The British categorically refused to extend their design warranty to the Indian modifications which nevertheless proved to be a success.

The Nilgiri class has been decommissioned by the navy, with the entry into service of the Shivalik-class. Five ships have been decommissioned and one sunk in an accident. INS Taragiri was the last ship of the class to be decommissioned, on 27 June 2013 in Mumbai, after serving 33 years in the navy.

== History ==
In November 1960, construction of three Leander-class frigates were approved by the government of India. The first frigate was ordered in July 1965 and the next two were ordered in September 1967. Three more frigates were ordered in July 1970. The Nilgiri-class frigates served as the mainstay and workhorse of the Indian Navy during the 1980s and early 1990s. The last two vessels (Taragiri and Vindhyagiri) had more powerful engines than the earlier vessels.

Taragiri had a serious fire in July 1994, but was repaired and was back in active service in 1995. Westinghouse supplied the Indian Navy with ASW sonar systems, two hull mounted arrays and three variable depth sonar arrays which are installed inside towed bodies built by Fathom Ocean Ltd. Transducer elements in both cases are identical. INS Udaygiri underwent a refit at Naval Dockyard, Mumbai. The remaining vessels in the series were expected to have their armaments brought into line with later ships.

INS Himgiri was used as a trial ship for the indigenous APSOH (Advanced Panoramic Sonar Hull) sonar.

== Ships ==
| Name | Pennant | Builder | Laid down | Launched | Commissioned | Decommissioned | Comments |
|---|---|---|---|---|---|---|---|
| Nilgiri | F33 | Mazagon | 23 October 1966 | 23 October 1968 | 3 June 1972 | 31 May 1996 | The hull was sunk on 24 April 1997, by a Sea Eagle AShM fired from a Sea Harrier Frs Mk.51 of the Indian Navy. |
| Himgiri | F34 | Mazagon | 4 November 1968 | 6 May 1970 | 23 November 1974 | 6 May 2005 | The vessel holds the distinction of having the maximum number of days at sea in single commission and was the first to shoot down a pilotless aircraft in 1976. Captain K N Zadu, VrC, (Retd.) who served as her first commanding officer, was the chief guest at the decommissioning ceremony along with Commander Ravneet Singh who served as her last commanding officer. |
| Udaygiri | F35 | Mazagon | 14 September 1970 | 24 October 1972 | 18 February 1976 | 24 August 2007 | |
| Dunagiri | F36 | Mazagon | 25 January 1973 | 9 March 1974 | 5 May 1977 | 20 October 2010 | Named after one of the Himalayan peaks. Her crest depicts the Osprey, a Himalayan bird and the ship's motto is 'Victory Is My Profession'. |
| Taragiri | F41 | Mazagon | 15 October 1975 | 25 October 1976 | 16 May 1980 | 27 June 2013 | The last ship to be decommissioned. |
| Vindhyagiri | F42 | Mazagon | 5 November 1976 | 12 November 1977 | 8 July 1981 | 14 Jun 2012 (15 Feb 2011 recovered) | The ship suffered a collision with MV Nord Lake at Mumbai harbour on 30 January 2011 and sank after a fire on board. No casualties were reported. It was re-floated by TITAN Salvage and was decommissioned later with full honours in 2012. |

== See also ==
- List of frigate classes by country

Equivalent frigates of the same era

- Peder Skram class
- Van Speijk class
- Alpino class
- Condell class
- Brooke class

== Bibliography ==
- Hiranandani, G. M. (2000). Transition to Triumph: History of the Indian Navy 1965–1975. New Delhi: Director Personnel Services and Lancer Publishers. ISBN 978-1-897829-69-1.
- Hiranandani, G. M. (2005). Transition to Eminence: The Indian Navy 1976–1990. New Delhi: Principal Director of Administration and Lancer Publishers. ISBN 81-7062-266-2.
