= INS Brahmaputra (1994) =

Brahmaputra class frigate

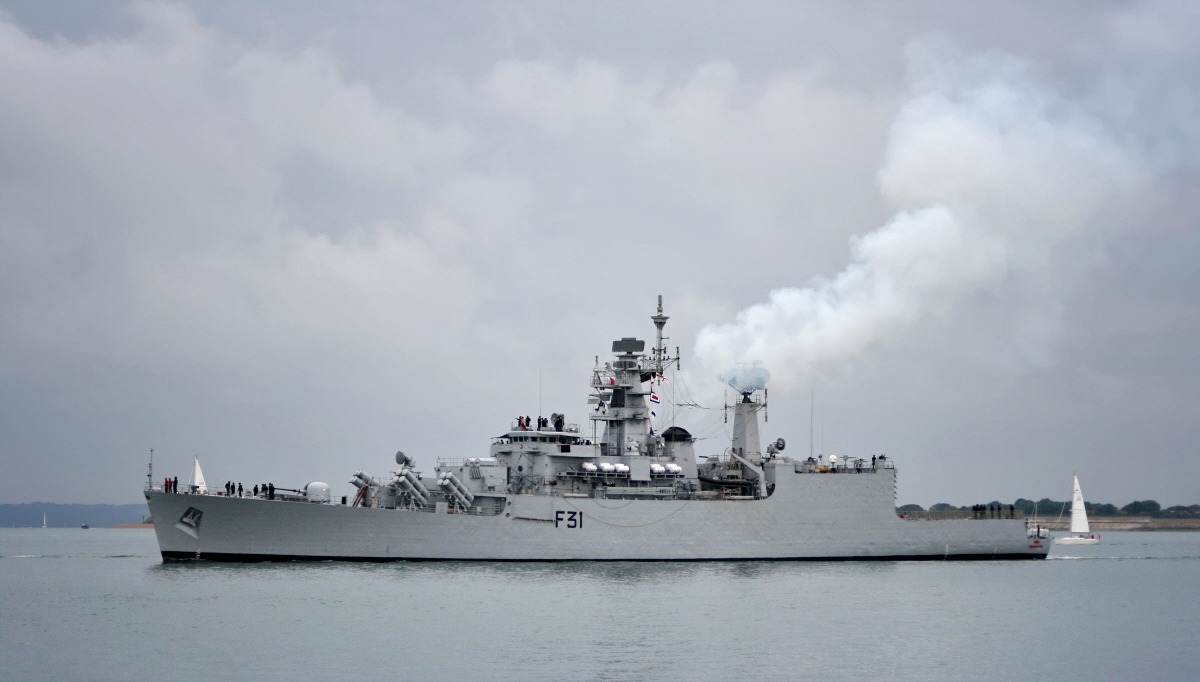
- INS Brahmaputra departing Portsmouth Naval Base, UK, 20 June 2009

History

India
- Name: INS Brahmaputra
- Namesake: River Brahmaputra
- Builder: Garden Reach Shipbuilders and Engineers
- Launched: 29 January 1994
- Commissioned: 14 April 2000
- Identification: F31
- Nickname(s): The Raging Rhino
- Status: Temporarily inactive, sustained severe damage in major fire

General characteristics
- Class & type: Brahmaputra-class guided missile frigate
- Displacement: 3,850 tons
- Length: 126.4 m (414 ft 8 in)
- Beam: 14.5 m (47 ft 7 in)
- Propulsion: 2 steam turbines, 22,370 kW (30,000 shp), 2 shafts
- Speed: 30 knots (56 km/h; 35 mph)+
- Range: 4,500 nautical miles (8,300 km; 5,200 mi)
- Complement: 440 to 450 (Including 40 officers + 13 aircrew)
- Sensors & processing systems: Radar; BEL RAWS-03 air/surface search radar; BEL/Signaal RAWL-02 (PLN 517) air search radar; Decca Bridgemaster/BEL Rashmi PIN 524 navigation radar; Sonar; BEL HUMSA (Hull Mounted Sonar Array); Thales Sintra towed array sonar; Fire control; BEL Aparna radar (Kh-35 SSM); Elta EL/M-2221 radar (Barak SAM); BEL Shikari opto-electronic trackers (guns)
- Electronic warfare & decoys: BEL Ajanta Mk.2C Electronic Warfare system; ELLORA Electronic Support Measures system; BEL Radar Warning Receiver Suite; Countermeasures; 2 × chaff/flare launcher; Super Barricade chaff launcher; 2 × Graesby G738 or BEL TOTED towed torpedo decoy
- Armament: 16 × Kh-35 (SS-N-25) SSM (4 x quadruple KT-184 launchers); 24 × Barak SAM (3 x octuple VLS units); 1 × OTO Melara 76 mm gun; 4 × AK-630 6-barreled 30 mm gatling gun; 2 × RBU-6000 213 mm anti-submarine rocket launcher; 2 × triple ILAS 3 324 mm torpedo tubes (Whitehead A244S anti-submarine torpedoes)
- Aircraft carried: 1 Sea King

INS Brahmaputra (F31) is the lead ship of her class of guided missile frigates of the Indian Navy. She was built at the Garden Reach Shipbuilders and Engineers (GRSE), Kolkata.

On 21 July 2024, the ship listed on one side during maintenance in Mumbai dockyard after a major fire onboard. The Navy had immediately initiated an investigation for the incident. As of May 2025, the ship is being repaired and is expected to regain its seaworthiness by early 2026 and will be combat-ready by mid-2026.

== Design and Construction ==
The design and construction of the ship is entirely Indian, and is a modification of the Godavari class of frigates. It is fitted with an array of modern sensor suites and matching weapon systems. INS Brahmaputra was commissioned on 14 April 2000 by Captain Pradeep 'Billoo' Chauhan, VSM.

This 3,600-tonne ship is 125 metres (410 ft) long and can reach speeds of up to 30 knots (56 km/h; 35 mph). She operates the Westland Sea King helicopter and the MATCH (Multi-Role Anti-Submarine Torpedo Carrying Helicopter) helicopter, which is an anti-submarine warfare variant of the Chetak helicopter. Brahmaputra is the second ship of the Indian Navy named for the River Brahmaputra. The first vessel of the name was a Type 41 Leopard-class frigate that was commissioned in 1958. The symbol of Brahmaputra is 'The Raging Rhino', for the one-horned rhino native to the Brahmaputra valley.

== Operations ==
=== Operation Sukoon ===
In July 2006,INS Brahmaputra, under the command of Captain Kapil Gupta, was a part of Task Force 54 on its return to India from the Mediterranean, when it was turned back to assist in Operation Sukoon. The task force consisted of three warships and a fleet tanker which were returning from a goodwill visit and were just about to cross the Suez Canal. After the evacuation, the task force remained on station in international waters off Lebanon, monitoring the conflict and ensuring the safety of remaining Indian nationals in Lebanon. The vessels left for their home ports on 10 August 2006. during the 2006 Israeli-Lebanese conflict.

=== Task Force Europe 2009 ===
During May–July 2009, Brahmaputra was a part of the Indian Navy task force on deployment to Europe. During this deployment, the task force participated in joint-exercises with the Royal Navy and the French Navy. Exercise Konkan-09 with the Royal Navy, was conducted off the coast of the United Kingdom. Exercise Varuna 2009 with the French Navy was off the coast of France.

== Fire and listing ==
The ship met a major fire accident in the evening of 21 July 2024 while going through a major retrofit in Naval Dockyard in Mumbai. The fire was brought under control with the help of firefighting units of the ship and that of the dockyard. The fire was doused by morning of 22 July. However, in late afternoon of 22 July, the ship had listed towards its port side and one junior sailor was reported missing for whom search operations had been initiated. The Navy carried out an investigation on the incident.

The then Chief of Naval Staff, Admiral Dinesh K. Tripathi, visited the accident site on 23 July and was briefed on the incident as well as the steps taken to make the necessary repairs. The Navy chief directed that all necessary steps be taken to ensure that the vessel returns to operational status as soon as possible. A Special Task Force, headed by a Rear Admiral-ranked officer, led the probe to determine the exact cause of the incident and those accountable for the incident.

The body of the missing sailor was recovered on 24 July after extensive diving operations. He was identified as leading seaman Sitendra Singh.

The ship had listed on its port side at an angle of about 40 to 45°. The listing was most likely due to imbalance during firefighting operations. There had not been much ingress of salt water. The damage is not as severe as in the case of INS Betwa (F39) accident and the damage will be assessed soon. The Navy reportedly sought a foreign specialist group for the salvage operation. It was ascertained that the process to make the ship upright and assessing the damage would take 3 months, it would take from 6 months to a year to bring the vessel back to service after the damage assessment.

By November 2024, the ship was successfully held upright with the help of balloon-like structures and foreign agencies. This was done after the ship had been moved to a dry dock. Later, a thorough assessment was also conducted on the damage and the repairs needed to operationalise the ship.

On 12 October 2026, the Indian Navy begun the court-martial proceedings of the Captain-ranked commanding officer on the charges of hazarding a naval ship and negligence along with the Lieutenant Commander-ranked officer of the day on the grounds of negligence in Mumbai. If convicted of the charges, the punishment from the court-martial could span from reprimand or loss of seniority to imprisonment for up to two years. Meanwhile, the ship has been repaired and is undergoing trials as of November and is expected to become seaworthy in 2027.

== Gallery ==
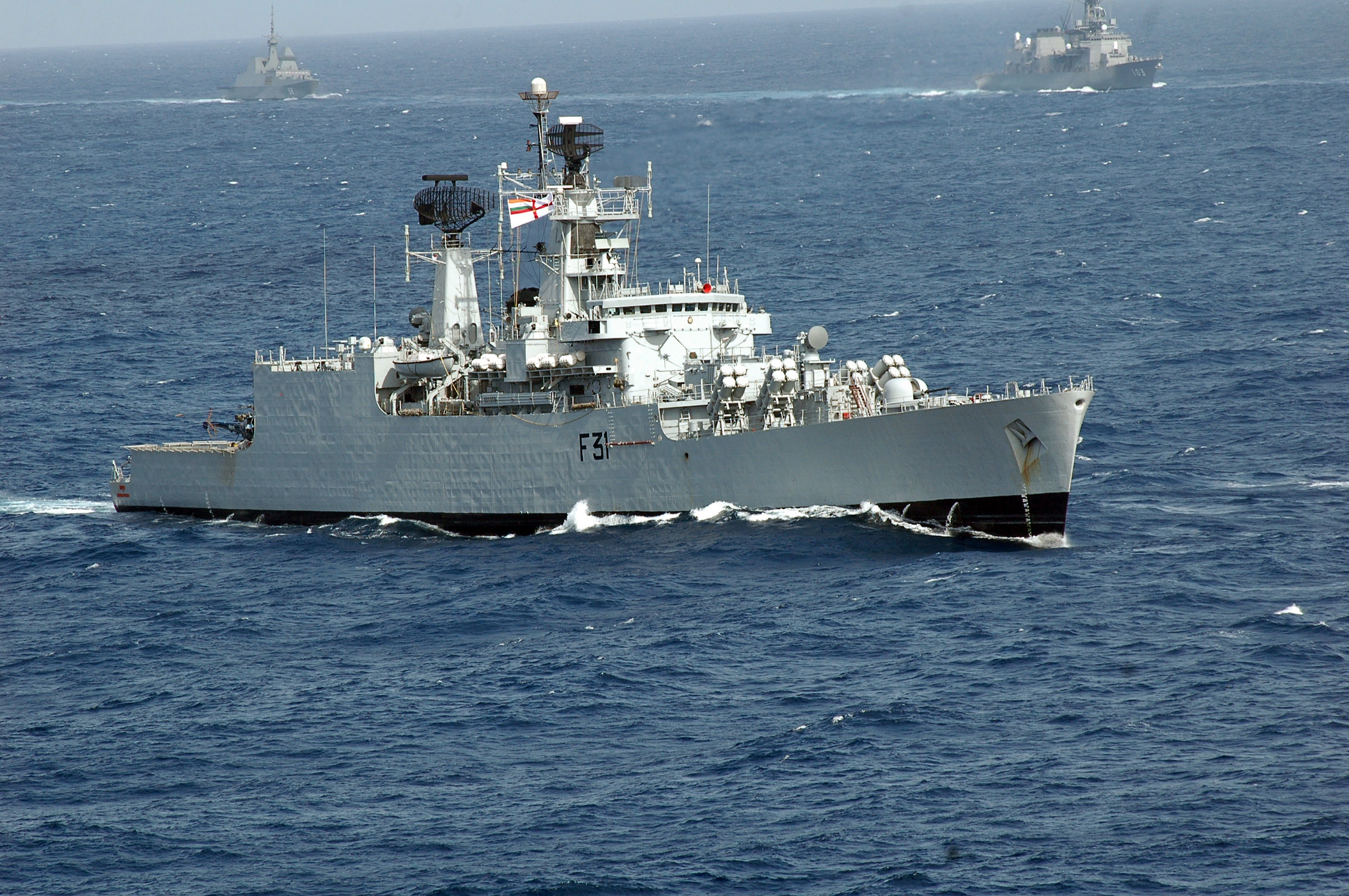
Brahmaputra during Exercise Malabar 2007.

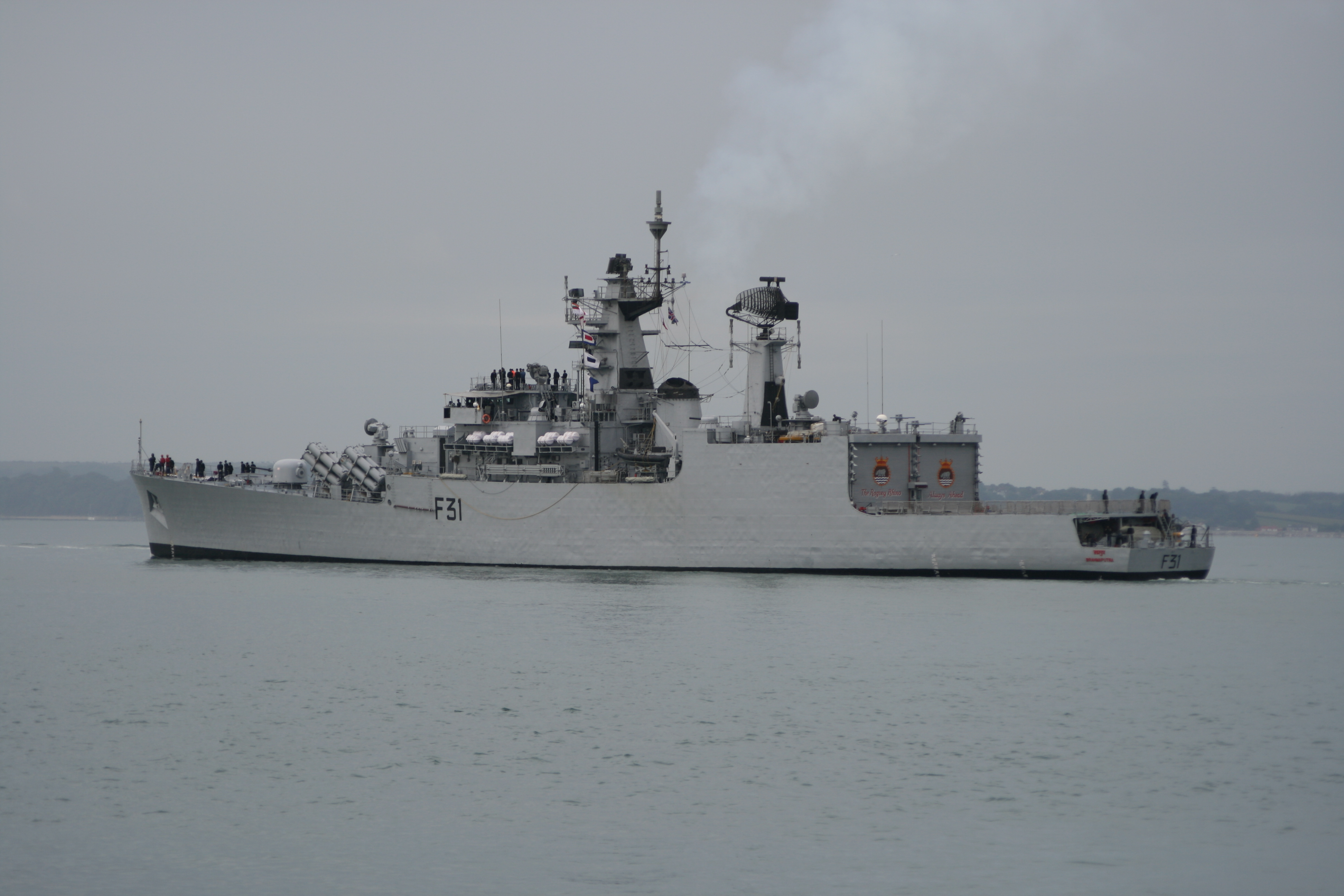
Brahmaputra departing Portsmouth Naval Base, UK, 20 June 2009.
