= INS Godavari (F20) =

Retired Godavari-class frigate of the Indian Navy

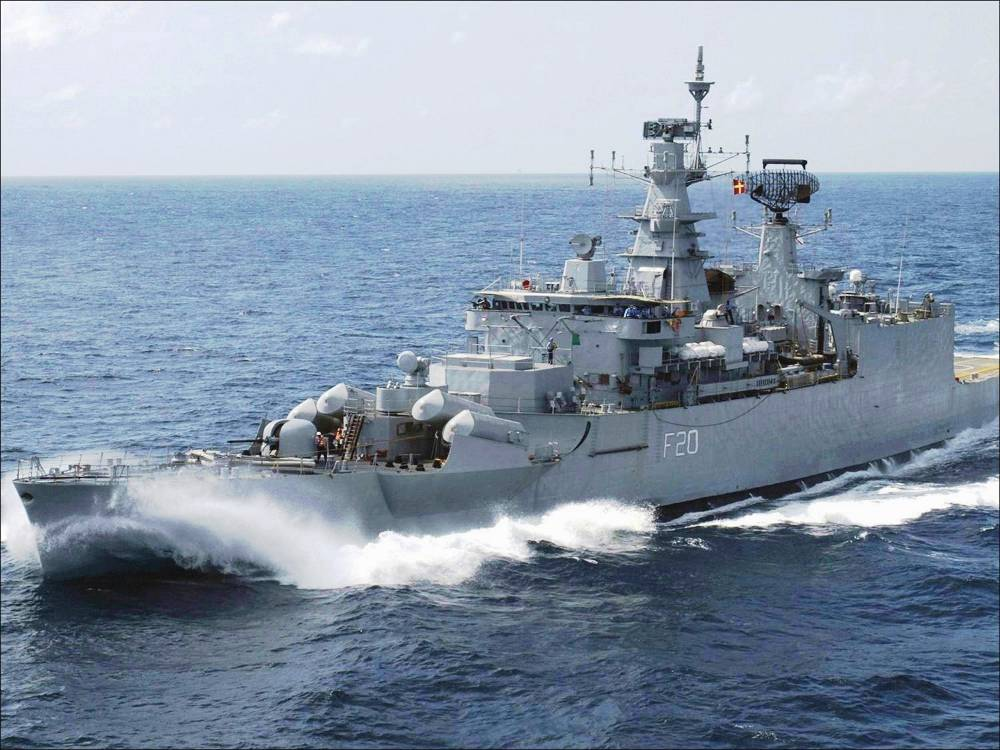
- INS Godavari

History

India
- Name: INS Godavari
- Namesake: Godavari River
- Builder: Mazagon Dock Limited
- Laid down: 3 November 1978
- Launched: 15 May 1980
- Commissioned: 10 December 1983
- Decommissioned: 23 December 2015
- Fate: Sunk as target, 2020

General characteristics
- Class & type: Godavari-class frigate
- Displacement: 3,600 tons standard, 3,850 tons full load
- Length: 126.4 m (414 ft 8 in)
- Beam: 14.5 m (47 ft 7 in)
- Draught: 4.5 m (14 ft 9 in)
- Propulsion: 2 turbines with 30,000 hp (22,000 kW) motors; 2 × 550 psi boilers; 2 shafts
- Speed: 27 knots (50 km/h)
- Range: 4,500 mi (7,200 km) at 12 knots (22 km/h)
- Complement: 313 (incl. 40 officers & 13 aircrew)
- Sensors & processing systems: 1 × Signaal D-band radar; 1 × MR-310U Angara (NATO: Head Net-C) E-band radar; 2 × Signaal ZW06 or Don Kay I-band radars for navigation; Bharat APSOH hull mounted sonar, Fathoms Oceanic VDS and Type 162M sonar; BEL HUMSA (Hull Mounted Sonar Array)
- Armament: 4 × P-20M (SS-N-2D Styx) AShMs in single-tube launchers; Barak SAM system; 1 x OTO Melara 76 mm gun (replaced 1 x 2 57 mm AK-725 gun; 4 × AK-230 30 mm gunmounts with 85° elevation (in CIWS role only); 6 × 324 mm ILAS 3 torpedo tubes with Whitehead A244S or NST 58 anti-submarine torpedoes
- Aircraft carried: 2 helicopters; Sea King Mk.42B or HAL Chetak

INS Godavari (F20) was the lead ship of her class of guided-missile frigates of the Indian Navy. Built by Mazagon Dock Limited in Mumbai, she was the first Indian warship to be indigenously designed and built. She was commissioned on 10 December 1983, and decommissioned on 23 December 2015 after a 32-year career.

== History ==
During the mid-1970s, the Navy's Directorate of Naval Design developed a concept for the next generation of frigates, which would supplant the British-designed Nilgiri-class frigates. The new Godavari-class frigates would be the first indigenously designed and built frigates, with vastly improved speed and firepower. As the lead ship of her class, Godavari was laid down on 3 November 1978 by the Chief of Naval Staff, Admiral Jal Cursetji, and was launched on 15 May 1980. She was commissioned on 10 December 1983.

== Operations ==
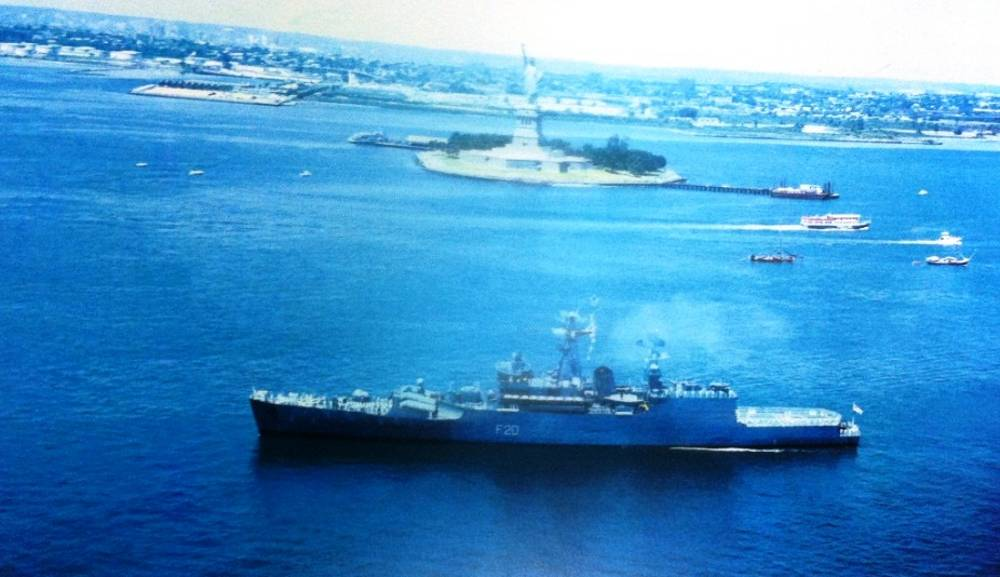
INS Godavari entering New York harbour in July 1986.

Notable operations involving INS Godavari include Operation Jupiter in 1988 (Sri Lanka), Operation Shield and Operation Bolster in 1994 (de-induction of Indian Army from Somalia), Patrol of Gulf of Aden (PoG) in 2009, and 2011 anti-piracy operations in the Gulf of Aden. The ship also visited New York harbour in July 1986 on the occasion of the bicentennial celebrations of the Statue of Liberty.

=== Operation Cactus ===
In 1988, following an attempted coup d'état against Maldivian President Maumoon Abdul Gayoom by Sri Lankan mercenaries, India launched Operation Cactus to restore the democratically elected government. After Indian paratroopers restored the presidency, the mercenaries captured Maldivian hostages on board a freighter and fled towards Sri Lanka. INS Godavari and INS Betwa successfully intercepted the freighter, rescued the hostages and arrested the mercenaries off the Sri Lankan coast.

=== UNOSOM II ===
While the UN Security Council Resolution 954, extended the UN mandate for UNOSOM II in Somalia to March 1995, the United States and other NATO members of the mission abandoned the peacekeeping effort and withdrew from Somalia over a year earlier. As the mission approached its scheduled end, the situation on the ground continued to deteriorate. With no other international support forthcoming, INS Godavari along with INS Ganga and INS Shakti were deployed to Mogadishu in December 1994 to support the withdrawal of the Indian Army's 66 Brigade, including the 2nd Battalion, Jammu & Kashmir Light Infantry (2 JAKLI).

== Incidents ==
Pakistan Naval Ship Babur brushed with INS Godavari in June 2011 while escorting Egyptian ship MV Suez. This incident triggered a diplomatic row between India and Pakistan.

== Fate ==
In 2014, a naval review board decided Godavari would be decommissioned the following year. After 32 years of service, she was decommissioned on 23 December 2015. A senior naval official said she would first be stripped of her weaponry and any salvageable fittings, and then most likely be sunk as a target ship. In October 2020, the frigate was sunk as a target in the Arabian Sea by the corvette INS Prabal.
