= INS Ganga (F22) =

Retired Godavari-class frigate of the Indian Navy

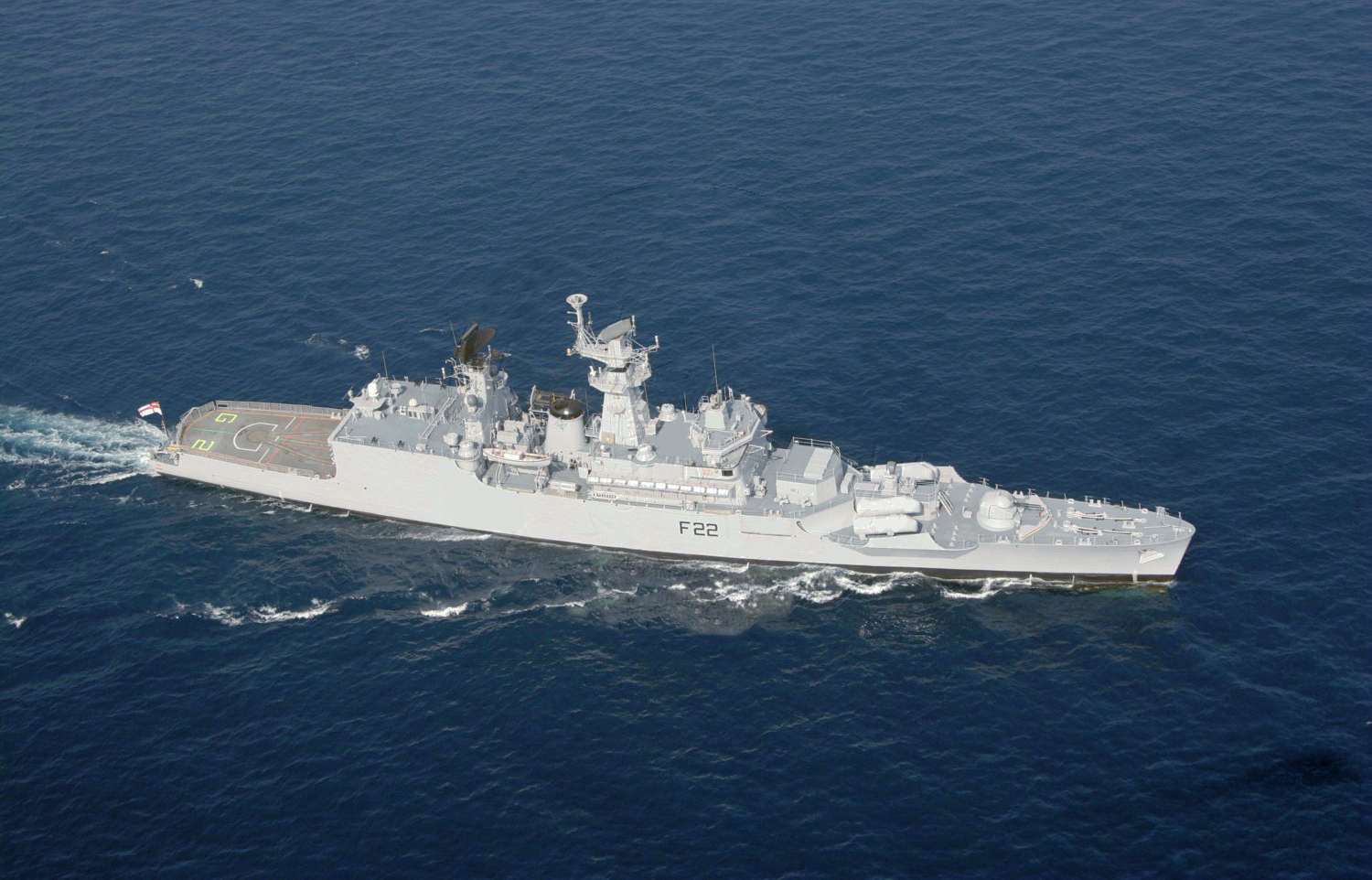
- INS Ganga

History

India
- Name: INS Ganga
- Namesake: Ganga River (the Ganges)
- Builder: Mazagon Dock Limited
- Launched: 21 October 1981
- Commissioned: 30 December 1985
- Decommissioned: 22 March 2018
- Identification: F22
- Status: Decommissioned

General characteristics
- Class & type: Godavari-class frigate
- Displacement: 3600 tons standard, 3850 tons full load
- Length: 126.4 m (414 ft 8 in)
- Beam: 14.5 m (47 ft 7 in)
- Draught: 4.5 m (14 ft 9 in)
- Propulsion: 2 turbines with 30,000 hp (22,000 kW) motors; 2 550 psi (3,800 kPa) boilers; 2 shafts
- Speed: 27 knots (50 km/h)
- Range: 4,500 mi (7,200 km) at 12 knots (22 km/h)
- Complement: 313 (incl. 40 Officers & 13 Aircrew)
- Sensors & processing systems: 1 × Signaal D-band radar; 1 × MR-310U Angara (NATO: Head Net-C) E-band radar; 2 × Signaal ZW06 or Don Kay I-band radars for navigation; Bharat APSOH hull mounted sonar, Fathoms Oceanic VDS and Type 162M sonar; BEL HUMSA (Hull Mounted Sonar Array)
- Armament: 4 × P-20M (SS-N-2D Styx) AShMs in single-tube launchers; Barak SAM system; 1 x OTO Melara 76 mm gun (replaced 1 x 2 57 mm AK-725 gun; 4 × AK-230 30 mm gunmounts with 85° elevation (in CIWS role only); 6 × 324 mm ILAS 3 torpedo tubes with Whitehead A244S or NST 58 anti-submarine torpedoes
- Aircraft carried: 2 helicopters; Sea King Mk.42B or HAL Chetak

INS Ganga (F22) was a Godavari-class guided-missile frigate of the Indian Navy. Built in Mumbai by Mazagon Dock Limited, she was commissioned into the Indian Navy on 30 December 1985. She was retired from active service on 28 May 2017, and was decommissioned on 22 March 2018.

== Operations ==
=== Commissioning ===
INS Ganga was commissioned on 30 December 1985 while berthed on the South Breakwater, Naval Dockyard, Mumbai (the called Bombay). Her first Commanding Officer was Captain Kailash Kohli (later Vice Admiral). The ship completed her post-commissioning trials in a record time of three months and joined the Western Fleet in mid April 1986.

=== UNOSOM II ===
While the UN Security Council Resolution 954, extended the UN mandate for UNOSOM II in Somalia to March 1995, the United States and other NATO members of the mission abandoned the peacekeeping effort and withdrew from Somalia over a year earlier. As the mission approached its scheduled end, the situation on the ground continued to deteriorate. With no other international support forthcoming, INS Ganga along with INS Godavari and INS Shakti were deployed to Mogadishu in December 1994 to support the withdrawal of the Indian Army's 66 Brigade, including the 2nd Battalion, Jammu & Kashmir Light Infantry (2 JAKLI).

=== Decommissioning ===
INS Ganga was decommissioned from active service on 22 March 2018.
