= INS Beas (2000) =

Brahmaputra-class frigate of the Indian Navy

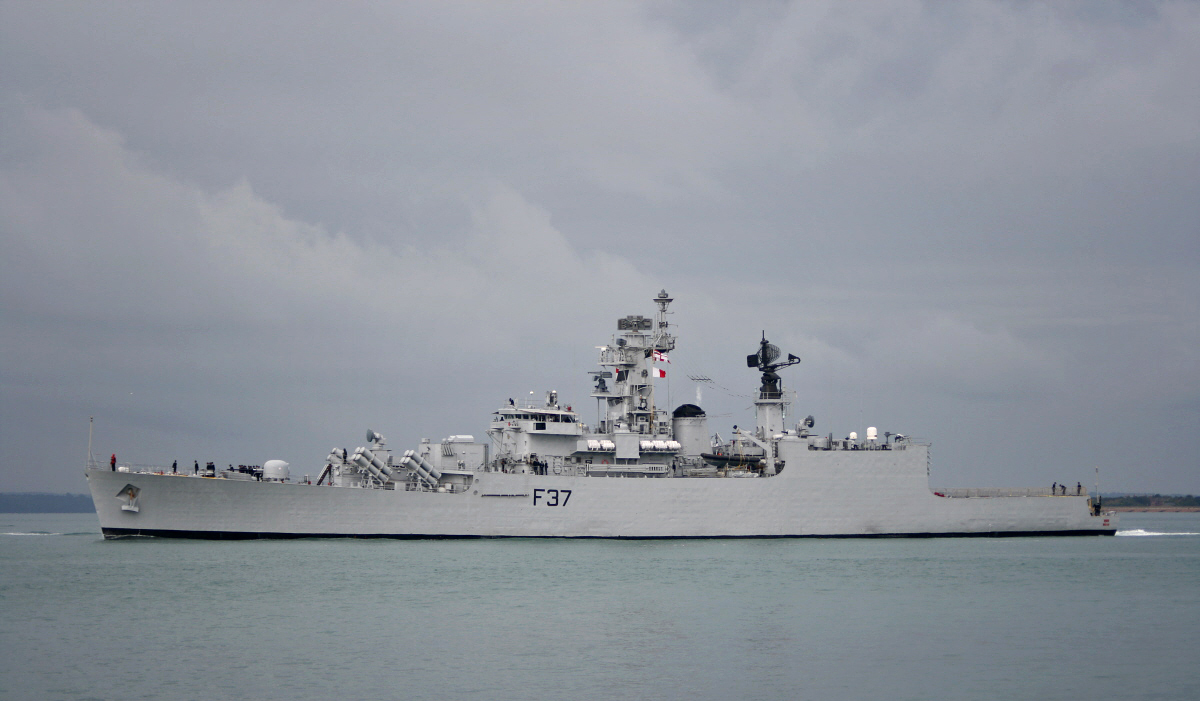
- INS Beas departing Portsmouth Naval Base, UK, 20 June 2009.

History

India
- Name: INS Beas
- Namesake: River Beas
- Builder: Garden Reach Shipbuilders and Engineers, India
- Launched: 28 November 2000
- Commissioned: 11 July 2005
- Status: Active

General characteristics
- Class & type: Brahmaputra-class frigate
- Displacement: 3,850 tons
- Length: 126.4 m (414 ft 8 in)
- Beam: 14.5 m (47 ft 7 in)
- Propulsion: 2 steam turbines delivering 22,370 kW (30,000 shp) to two shafts
- Speed: 30 knots (56 km/h; 35 mph)+
- Range: 4,500 nautical miles (8,300 km; 5,200 mi)
- Complement: 440 to 450 (Including 40 Officers + 13 aircrew)
- Sensors & processing systems: Radar; BEL RAWS-03 air/surface search radar; BEL/Signaal RAWL-02 (PLN 517) air search radar; Decca Bridgemaster/BEL Rashmi PIN 524 navigation radar; Sonar; BEL HUMSA (Hull Mounted Sonar Array); Thales Sintra towed array sonar; Fire control; BEL Aparna radar (Kh-35 SSM); Elta EL/M-2221 radar (Barak SAM); BEL Shikari opto-electronic trackers (guns)
- Electronic warfare & decoys: BEL Ajanta Mk.2C Electronic Warfare system; ELLORA Electronic Support Measures system; BEL Radar Warning Receiver Suite; Countermeasures; 2 × chaff/flare launcher; Super Barricade chaff launcher; 2 × Graesby G738 or BEL TOTED towed torpedo decoy
- Armament: 16 × Kh-35 (SS-N-25 Switchblade) SSM (4 x quadruple KT-184 launchers); 24 × Barak SAM (3 x octuple VLS units); 1 × OTO Melara 76 mm gun; 4 × AK-630 6-barreled 30 mm gatling gun; 2 × RBU-6000 213 mm anti-submarine rocket launcher; 2 × triple ILAS 3 324 mm torpedo tubes (Whitehead A244S anti-submarine torpedoes)
- Aircraft carried: 1 Sea King, 1 Match Helos

INS Beas (F37) is a Brahmaputra-class frigate of the Indian Navy. She was built at the Garden Reach Shipbuilders and Engineers (GRSE), Kolkata.

The design and construction of the ship is entirely Indian, and is a modification of the Godavari-class frigate. She is fitted with an array of modern sensor suites and matching weapon systems.

Beas is named for the River Beas. She is the second ship in the Indian Navy to bear the name. The first was a Leopard-class frigate commissioned in 1960 and scrapped in 1992.

== Upgrade ==
On 16 October 2023, Ministry of Defence signed a contract for the mid-life upgrade of INS Beas with Cochin Shipyard Limited. In early April 2024, the mid-life upgrade of INS Beas began making her the first ship of the Brahmaputra class to be upgraded. The upgrade included conversion of steam turbine propulsion into diesel propulsion (CODAD) and other equipment and systems upgrade. INS Beas will likely be fitted with Caterpillar marine diesel engine with 6-MW power. The overall upgrade will take 2 years for completion. The upgrade will increase the remaining service lifespan of the frigate from current 10 years to more than 25 years after completion. According to an official, “there are issues such as steam leaks and high temperatures in the boiler and engine rooms of these ships which contribute to uncomfortable working conditions for the crew.” The upgrade will reduce the maintenance requirement of the ships. The Upgrade has commenced as of May 2024.

== Service history ==
=== Task Force Europe 2009 ===
During May–July 2009, Beas was a part of the Indian Navy task force on deployment to Europe. During this deployment, the task force participated in joint-exercises with the Royal Navy and the French Navy. Exercise Konkan-09 with the Royal Navy, was conducted off the coast of the United Kingdom. Exercise Varuna 2009 with the French Navy was off the coast of France.

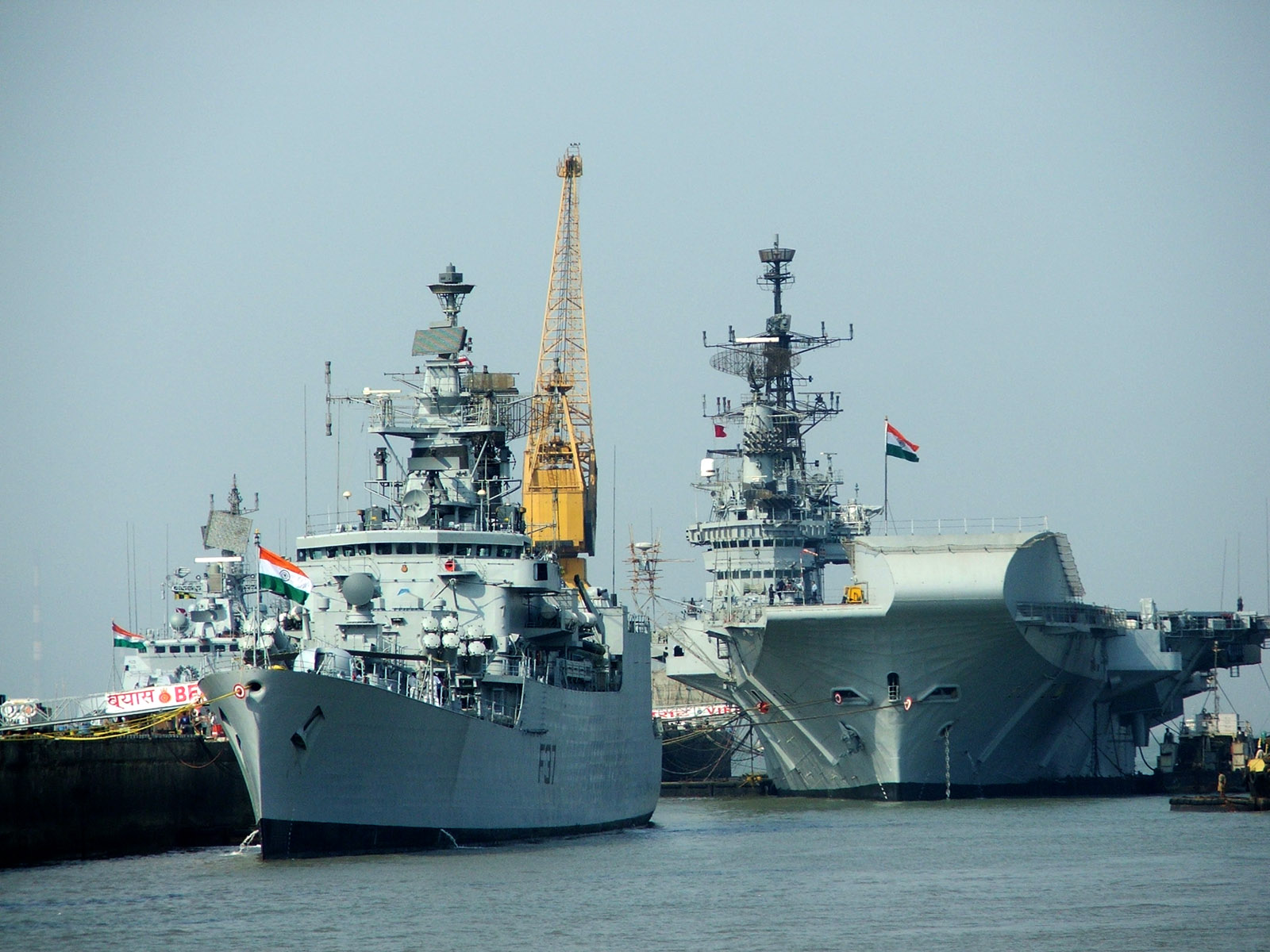
INS Beas with INS Viraat
