= Brahmaputra-class frigate =

Indian Navy ship class

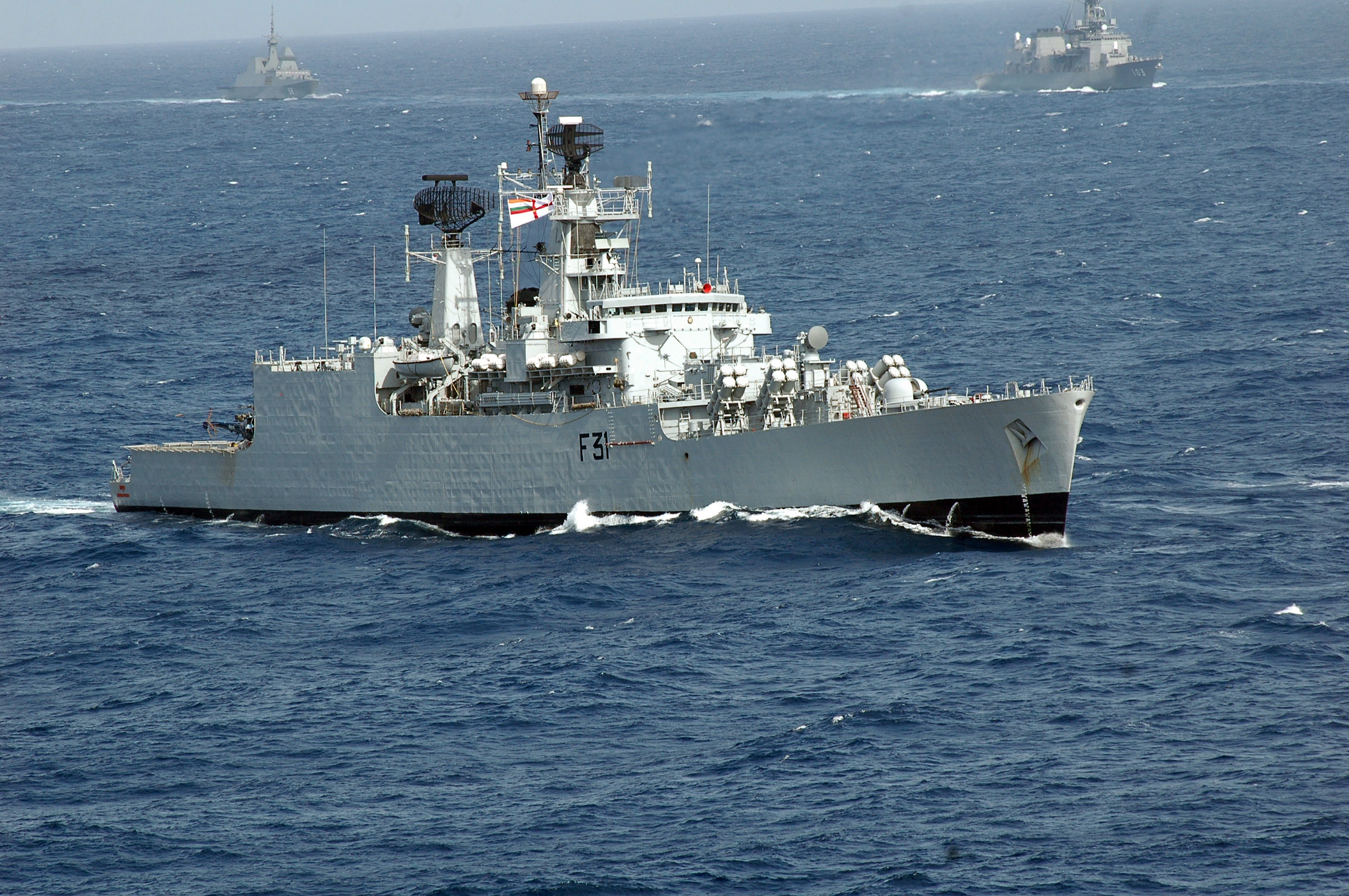
- INS Brahmaputra of the Brahmaputra class on Exercise Malabar

Class overview
- Name: Brahmaputra class
- Builders: Garden Reach Shipbuilders and Engineers
- Operators: Indian Navy
- Preceded by: Godavari class
- Succeeded by: Talwar class
- Built: 1989–2005
- In commission: 2000–present
- Planned: 3
- Completed: 3
- Active: 2
- Laid up: 1

General characteristics
- Type: Guided-missile frigate
- Displacement: Standard: 3,600 tonnes Full load: 3,850 tonnes
- Length: 126.4 m (415 ft)
- Beam: 14.5 m (48 ft)
- Draught: 4.5 m (15 ft)
- Propulsion: 2 BHEL Bhopal steam turbines delivering 22,370 kW (30,000 shp) to 2 shafts
- Speed: 30+ knots
- Range: 4,500 nautical miles (8,330 km; 5,180 mi) at 12 knots (22 km/h; 14 mph)
- Complement: 300
- Sensors & processing systems: Radar; BEL RAWS-03 air/surface search radar; BEL/Signaal RAWL-02 (PLN 517) air search radar; Decca Bridgemaster/BEL Rashmi PIN 524 navigation radar; BEL Aparna Fire Control radar (Kh-35 SSM); Elta EL/M-2221 Search, Track & Guidance/Gunnery Radar (Barak SAM); Sonar; BEL HUMSA (Hull Mounted Sonar Array); Thales Sintra towed array sonar; OE; BEL Shikari opto-electronic trackers (guns)
- Electronic warfare & decoys: BEL Ajanta Mk.2C Electronic Warfare system; ELLORA Electronic Support Measures system; BEL Radar Warning Receiver Suite; Decoy; 2 × chaff/flare launcher; Super Barricade chaff launcher; 2 × Graesby G738 or BEL TOTED towed torpedo decoy
- Armament: 16 × Kh-35 (SS-N-25) SSM (4 × quadruple KT-184 launchers); 24 × Barak point-defence surface-to-air missiles (3 × 8 cell VLS units); 1 × OTO Melara 76 mm gun; 4 × AK-630 6-barreled 30 mm gatling gun; 2 × triple ILAS 3 324 mm torpedo tubes (Whitehead A244S anti-submarine torpedoes)
- Aircraft carried: 2 Sea King or HAL Chetak

The Brahmaputra-class frigates (Type 16A or Project 16A) are guided-missile frigates of the Indian Navy, designed and built in India. They are an enhancement of the Godavari class, with a displacement of 3850 tons and a length of 126 metres (413 ft). Although of similar hull and dimension, internally, the Brahmaputra and Godavari classes have different configurations, armaments and capabilities. 3 ships of this class serve in the Indian Navy.

The class and the lead ship, INS Brahmaputra, are named after the River Brahmaputra. Subsequent ships of the class, INS Betwa and INS Beas are also named for Indian rivers.

== History ==
In 1986, the Cabinet Committee on Political Affairs (CCPA) decided to diversify India's warship building capability, and start an alternate production line to the Godavari-class frigates that were built at Mazagon Dock Limited (MDL) in Bombay. 3 additional Godavari-class frigates were to be built at Garden Reach Shipbuilders and Engineers (GRSE) in Calcutta. After a transfer of technology from MDL to GRSE, production was to start in 1988, with deliveries between 1993 and 1996.

However, as the production was about to commence, the Indian Navy's requirements were revised, which led to frequent changes in the design. The re-designed ship, christened Project 16A, had its General Arrangement Drawings finalized only in September 1994.

=== Accidents ===
On 5 December 2016, INS Betwa was undergoing a refit at Mumbai Naval Dockyard when it tipped over during undocking. The salvage and repair of the ship will take approximately two years.

On 21 July, 2024 Brahmaputra caught fire at dock at the Mumbai Naval Dockyard. After the fire was extinguished, she rolled onto her port side and listed partially above water. One crewman missing.

== Design ==
The basic design of the ship was proposed by Indian Navy's Directorate of Naval Design. The detailed design development was undertaken by GRSE. The ships were originally designed to be fitted with the Trishul SAM, but in 2001, the decision was made to deploy the Barak SAM.

The Times of India reported on 7 September 2005, that Betwa became the first Indian warship to successfully integrate indigenous combat data systems, with a wide variety of foreign/Indian weapons and sensors on board. While Brahmaputra was the first warship to be equipped with the BEL combat data systems, it was Betwa that has validated the indigenous technology platform. Captain C S Murthy, Commanding Officer of Betwa, stated that the integrated systems had been successfully tested to an extreme. The anti-submarine warfare officer of Betwa, Lieutenant Commander Sharad Parti, stated, "The EMMCA system gives commanders on the ship a consolidated tactical picture. It adds to the ship's maritime combat power." Commodore R P S Ravi, Director of the Maritime Warfare Centre in Mumbai, stated that it was a significant achievement for the Navy that indigenous data systems would be used for target evaluation, weapon selection and target engagement.

=== Design ===
The vessels are designed for a crew of 350 (including 40 officers + 13 aircrew). The ships are propelled by 2 BHEL Bhopal 15,000 brake horsepower (11,000 kW) steam turbines.

=== Command and control ===
The vessels feature a Bharat RAWS-03 S-band radar using a DA08 antenna for air/surface search. The air search radar is a Bharat/Signaal RAWL-02 (PLN 517) D-band radar using a LW08 antenna. They use a One Decca Bridgemaster, BEL Rashmi (PIN 524) I-band radar with a ZW06 antenna for navigation.

The ships are provided with a BEL HUMSA (Hull Mounted Sonar Array), a medium-frequency, active panoramic search and attack sonar. They also use a Thales (Thomson Marconi Sonar) Sintra towed array sonar.

Vessels feature BEL's EMCCA (Electronic Modular Command & Control Applications) Action Information Organisation (AIO) system with 10 multi-function consoles using Barco MPRD 9651 display linked with a LAN (Large Area Network). The system is capable of C3I and threat analysis and all tactical data can be integrated onto one display if necessary. The EMCCA system is an intra-naval AIO package made by Bharat Electronics Ltd. The vessels also feature an Indian-developed data link and Inmarsat communications (JRC). These frigates can operate in all environments, including those contaminated by nuclear, chemical or biological fallouts.

=== Armament ===
The Brahmaputra class is armed with sixteen 3M-24E (Kh-35 Uran or NATO: SS-N-25 Switchblade) anti-ship missiles (AShM), housed in four quadruple KT-184 launchers, angled at 30°, two on either side of the bridge superstructure. Equivalent to the Harpoon Block 1C AShM, these missiles have active radar homing (ARH) out to a range of 130 km (81 mi) at 0.9 Mach, with a 145 kg (320 lb) warhead. All 16 Urans can be ripple-fired in 2-3 second intervals. Fire control is provided by a BEL Aparna (modified Garpun-Bal FC, NATO: Plank Shave) radar. The Garpun-Bal FC radar combines active and passive channels and in the active target designation mode, it operates in X-band (I/J-band) and can handle up to 150 targets at ranges between 35–45 km (22–28 mi), although it is possible to obtain ranges of more than 180 km (110 mi) in wave-guide propagation conditions. The passive channel operates in the ESM mode searching for pulse and CW signals, and accurately identifying the bearing of hostile emitters from a built-in classification library of up to 1,000 signatures. The maximum range of the passive channel is over 100 km depending on the frequency.

The shoulder-held Igla-M (SA-N-10) SAM launcher was used as a stop-gap measure aboard INS Brahmaputra at launch, until the ship was retro-fitted with the Israeli Barak SAM system, with fire control provided by an EL/M-2221 STGR radar. INS Betwa and INS Beas were commissioned with these systems deployed.

One OTO Melara Super Rapid 76 mm (3 in) main gun, for use against ship and shore targets, with 65 rounds per minute to 4.4 nautical miles (8.1 km; 5.1 mi). Four multi-barrelled 30 mm (1.2 in) AK-630 Gatling guns on either beam, to shoot down incoming anti-ship missiles, with 5500 to 6000 rds/min to 2.5 km (1.6 mi). Fire control for these five gun mounts are provided by two BEL Shikari (based on the Contraves Seaguard) opto-electronic trackers that operate in the I- and Ka-bands. Either of the Shikari trackers can control all five gun mounts or any combination thereof. Good minimum ranges, for the 76 mm gun, have been largely achieved by advanced software.

Six 324 mm (13 in) ILAS 3 torpedo tubes in two triple mounts with Whitehead A244S anti-submarine torpedoes, with active/passive homing to 3.8 nautical miles (7.0 km; 4.4 mi) at 33 knots (61 km/h; 38 mph) with a 34 kg (75 lb) shaped charged warhead. Can also fire the AET anti-submarine torpedo, a locally produced version of the A244S.

The weapons-control radar is a BEL Shikari, BEL Aparna, RAN and RAWS-03. A BEL Ajanta Mk.2C is used as the EW (Electronic Warfare) suite. A media report, dated 5 May 2007, stated that the ELLORA Electronic Support Measures (ESM) system is fitted aboard Beas and the other two vessels in the class will also feature this ESM system. The ELLORA is an indigenous development by the Defence Electronics Research Laboratory (DLRL). The vessels are also fitted with two chaff/flare launchers, featuring long and medium range deceiver chaff. Features two Graesby G738 Towed Torpedo Decoy systems or the indigenously developed BEL Towed Torpedo Decoy. The 'Super Barricade' chaff launcher is also installed.

=== Aircraft ===
Depending on operation requirements, two Sea King Mk.42B anti-ship and anti-submarine helicopters can be embarked or a combination of the HAL Chetak and a Sea King Mk.42B is usually embarked. The latter is equipped with a surface search radar, dunking sonar and can carry two Sea Eagle AShMs or a combination of depth charges and AS-244 anti-submarine torpedoes. The Sea King Mk.42B helicopter can fly 400 km (250 mi) around the vessel and is equipped with a data link to download target data to the combat information centre, based on the indigenous Bharat Shikari (Hunter) combat data system, in the operations room. Bharat Shikari is a derivative of the Italian IPN series of combat data systems, but integrating Western, Russian and Indian weapons and sensor systems.

== Construction ==
The construction of these vessels at GRSE was slowed down due to a combination of design changes, labor problems, delays in equipment availability and integration problems with the Trishul SAM. This caused severe delays to the commissioning date of Brahmaputra. The vessel was laid down in 1989 as a part of the Godavari class. After the new design for Project 16A was finalized in September 1994, the ship was finally commissioned on 14 April 2000.

=== Mid life Upgrade ===
On 16 October 2023, Ministry of Defence signed a contract for he mid-life upgrade of INS Beas with Cochin Shipyard Limited. In early April 2024, the mid-life upgrade of INS Beas began. The upgrade included conversion of steam turbine propulsion into diesel propulsion (CODAD) and other equipment and systems upgrade. INS Beas will likely be fitted with Caterpillar marine diesel engine with 6-MW power. The overall upgrade will take 2 years for completion. The upgrade will increase the remaining service lifespan of the frigate from current 10 years to more than 20 years after completion. According to an official, “there are issues such as steam leaks and high temperatures in the boiler and engine rooms of these ships which contribute to uncomfortable working conditions for the crew.” The upgrade will reduce the maintenance requirement of the ships.

This upgrade will also be incorporated on the other two ships of the class for which the request for proposal will be issued soon. The two other ships in the Brahmaputra class would probably be the first to have indigenous diesel engines as a result of the indigenous development of the marine diesel engine under the 'Make-I category' (Note: Make-I category: Projects under ‘Make-I’ sub-category will involve Government funding of 90%, released in a phased manner and based on the progress of the scheme, as per terms agreed between MoD and the vendor.), which is believed to have been taken up by Kirloskar Oil Engines Ltd and Garden Reach Shipbuilders and Engineers Ltd (GRSE). According to sources, orders for thirty diesel engines would be issued after the engine's successful development, and these would be installed in vehicles such as the Next Generation Corvette (NGC).

== Ships of the class ==
Name	Pennant	Builder	Laid down	Launched	Commissioned	Status
Brahmaputra	F31	GRSE	1989	26 January 1994	14 April 2000	Temporarily inactive
Betwa	F39	GRSE	22 August 1994	26 February 1998	7 July 2004	Active
Beas	F37	GRSE	26 February 1998	28 November 2000	11 July 2005	Active

== See also ==
- List of active Indian Navy ships
- List of frigate classes in service

Equivalent frigates of the same era

- La Fayette class
- Hydra class
- Type 053H3
- Barbaros class
- Lekiu class
