= INS Gomati (F21) =

Retired Godavari-class frigate of the Indian Navy

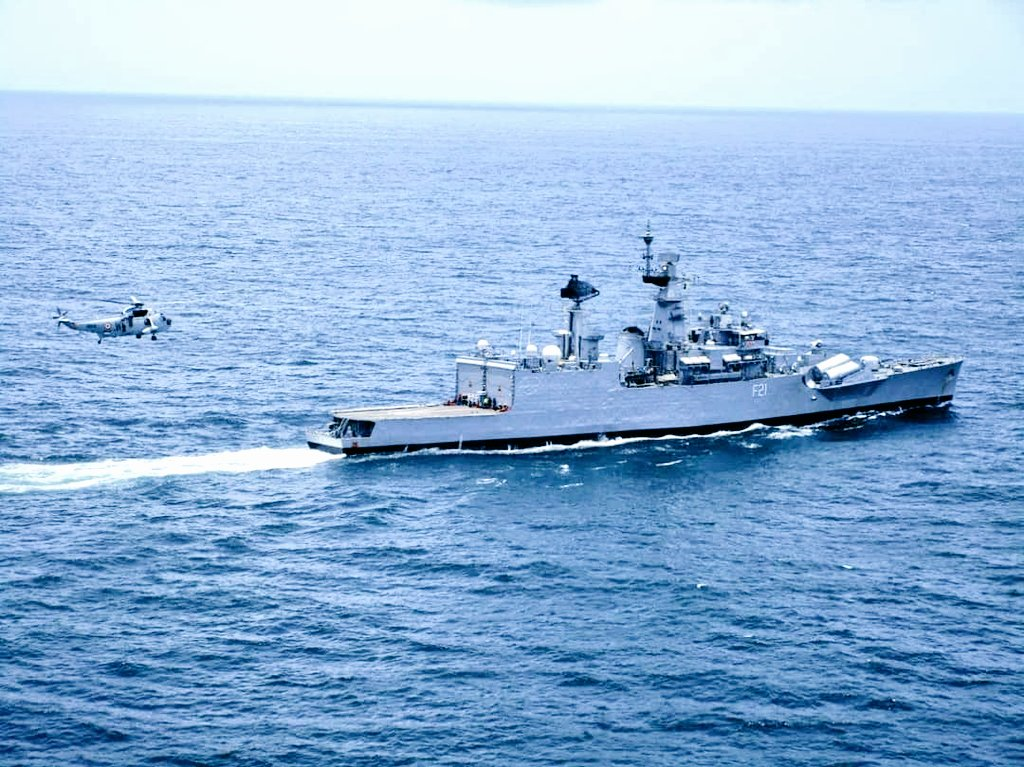

History

India
- Name: INS Gomati
- Namesake: Gomti River
- Builder: Mazagon Dock Limited
- Launched: 19 March 1984
- Commissioned: 16 April 1988
- Decommissioned: 28 May 2022
- Fate: Museum ship (dismantled and displayed in Lucknow)

General characteristics
- Class & type: Godavari-class frigate
- Displacement: 3,600 long tons (3,658 t) standard; 3,860 long tons (3,922 t) full load
- Length: 126.4 m (415 ft)
- Beam: 14.5 m (48 ft)
- Draught: 4.5 m (15 ft)
- Propulsion: 2 turbines with 30,000 hp motors; 2 550 psi boilers; 2 shafts
- Speed: 27 knots (50 km/h; 31 mph)
- Range: 4,500 mi (7,200 km) at 12 kn (22 km/h; 14 mph)
- Complement: 313 (incl. 40 officers & 13 aircrew)
- Sensors & processing systems: 1 × Signaal D-band radar; 1 × MR-310U Angara (NATO: Head Net-C) E-band radar; 2 × Signaal ZW06 or Don Kay I-band radars for navigation; Bharat APSOH hull mounted sonar, Fathoms Oceanic VDS and Type 162M sonar; BEL HUMSA (Hull Mounted Sonar Array)
- Armament: 4 × P-20M anti-ship missiles in single-tube launchers; Barak SAM system; 1 x OTO Melara 76 mm gun (replaced 1 x 2 57 mm AK-725 gun; 4 × AK-230 30 mm gunmounts with 85° elevation (in CIWS role only); 6 × 324 mm ILAS 3 torpedo tubes with Whitehead A244-S or NST 58 anti-submarine torpedoes
- Aircraft carried: 2 helicopters; Sea King Mk.42B or HAL Chetak

INS Gomati (F21) was a Godavari-class guided-missile frigate of Indian Navy.

== Career ==
The ship was built by Mazagon Dock Ltd in Mumbai and has an indigenous content of 72%. After her mid-life upgrade in 2011, the ship has been fitted with new weapons and sensors, which include the Barak 1 surface-to-air missile system, an Oto Melara 76 mm gun, HUMSA sonar and Advanced Ship Control System for UAVs. On March 28, 2019, an Indian Navy personnel onboard INS Gomati died during weapons firing drills at sea. Gomati was decommissioned on 28 May 2022 after 34 years of service. The ship has been formally transferred to the Government of Uttar Pradesh since 28 May 2022, following which it has been completely dismantled and transported to Lucknow where it is installed as the "Gomati Shaurya Smarak," a museum of Gomati's service career.
