= Operation Sukoon =

Operation Sukoon (Hindi, lit relief) was an operation launched by the Indian Navy to evacuate Indian, Sri Lankan and Nepalese nationals, as well as Lebanese nationals with Indian spouses, from the conflict zone during the 2006 Lebanon War.

The Indian Armed Forces also launched a similar effort, Operation Safe Homecoming, to bring Indian nationals from Libya during the 2011 Libyan civil war.

== Background ==
Military conflict between Israel and the Hezbollah broke out in July–August 2006, when on 12 July, Hezbollah launched a cross-border raid into Israel, in which 10 Israeli soldiers were killed, and two of their bodies were captured to be used to bargain for the release of Lebanese prisoners in Israel. Israel responded with an aerial and maritime blockade, a massive bombing campaign and ground invasion of Lebanon. During the war, numerous foreign nationals visiting Lebanon were caught up in the conflict. One Indian citizen was killed and three wounded on 21 July in an Israeli bombing attack.

The Government of India asked the Indian Armed Forces to help evacuate its citizens at risk from the conflict zone. Of the over 10,000 Indian nationals in Lebanon, almost 2,000 were at risk. Neighbouring Sri Lanka and Nepal, which lacked military resources, also requested that the Indian government help evacuate their citizens. Altogether, over 2,200 nationals of these countries were caught in the conflict zone.

== Response ==
Indian Navy Task Force 54, consisting of three warships and a fleet tanker, was returning to India from the Mediterranean following a goodwill visit and was just about to cross the Suez Canal. Following the hostilities, it was ordered to turn back to help evacuate Indian nationals from Lebanon. The task force comprised the destroyer INS Mumbai, the frigates INS Brahmaputra, INS Betwa and the fleet tanker INS Shakti.

The plan for the evacuation was for the warships were to take the evacuees to Cyprus, from where chartered Air India flights would fly them back to India. The warships were on high alert at battle stations. The task force's seven helicopters were airborne to detect and intercept any of the belligerent forces mistaking the Indian vessels for their enemy.

Mumbai evacuated 1,495 people to Cyprus, in three sorties on 20, 23 and 26 July. Brahmaputra and Betwa evacuated 188 and 254 people, respectively, during a sortie on 23 July. Shakti was not deployed for a front-line evacuation since that vessel was more vulnerable without rapid reaction defence systems and less manoeuvrable. However, the support ship helped provide fuel and provisions for the evacuees on board the other ships during the operation.

Altogether a total of 2,280 people including 1,764 Indians were evacuated. 112 Sri Lankans, 64 Nepalese and seven Lebanese nationals with Indian spouses were also among the evacuees. Citizens of other friendly nations at risk were also evacuated as a courtesy. This was one of the largest evacuation operations conducted by the Indian Navy since World War II.

After the evacuation, the task force remained on station in international waters off Lebanon, monitoring the conflict, and ensuring the safety of remaining Indian nationals in Lebanon. The vessels left for their home ports on 10 August 2006.
