= Godavari-class frigate =

Class of frigates in India

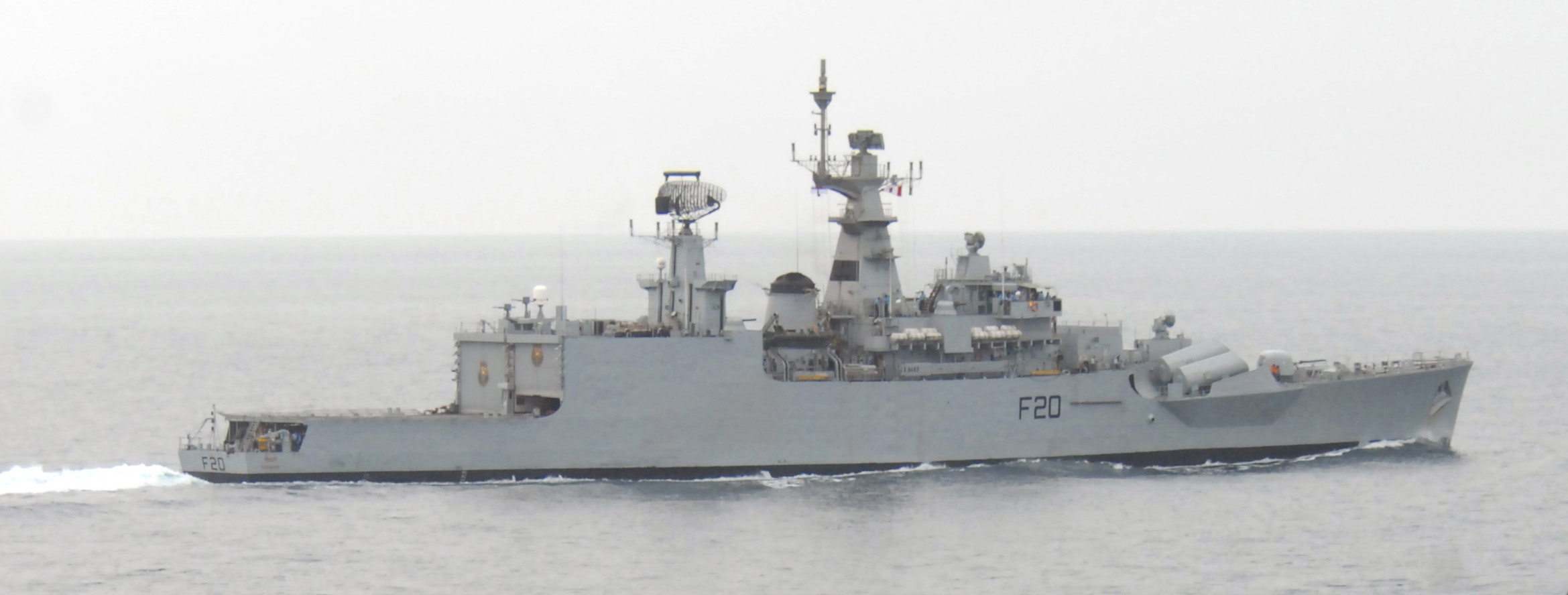
- INS Godavari

Class overview
- Name: Godavari class
- Builders: Mazagon Dock Limited
- Operators: Indian Navy
- Preceded by: Nilgiri class
- Succeeded by: Brahmaputra class
- Built: 1978 – 1988
- In commission: 1983 – 2022
- Planned: 3
- Completed: 3
- Retired: 3

General characteristics
- Type: Guided-missile frigate
- Displacement: 3,600 tonnes (standard); 3,850 tonnes (full load)
- Length: 126.5 m (415 ft 0 in)
- Beam: 14.5 m (47 ft 7 in)
- Draught: 4.5 m (14 ft 9 in)
- Propulsion: 2 × Babcock & Wilcox boilers 38.7 kg/cm^{2} (550 psi); 2 × steam turbines 30,000 hp (22,400 kW); 2 shafts
- Speed: 28 knots (52 km/h)
- Range: 4,500 nmi (8,300 km) at 12 knots (22 km/h)
- Complement: 313 (incl. 40 officers, 13 air crew)
- Sensors & processing systems: Radar; Signaal LW08 D-band air search radar; MR-310U Angara (NATO:Head Net C) E/F-band 3D air/surface radar; 2 × Signaal ZW06 or Don Kay I-band navigation radars; MR-103 GFCS Fire Control radar; EL/M-2221 STGR Fire control radar (Barak SAM) (replaced MPZ-310 radar (SA-N-4 SAM)); Sonar; BEL HUMSA (Hull Mounted Sonar Array)
- Electronic warfare & decoys: Selenia INS-3 (Bharat Ajanta and Elettronica TQN-2) used for ESM/ECM; Decoys; 2 × chaff/flare launchers; 1 × Graesby G738 towed torpedo decoy
- Armament: 4 × SS-N-2D Styx AShM; 24 × Barak 1 SAM (3 × 8 cell VLS units) (replaced SA-N-4 SAM); 1 × OTO Melara 76 mm gun (replaced AK-725 twin-barreled 57 mm gun); 4 × AK-630 30 mm CIWS; 2 × triple 324 mm (12.8 in) tubes (Whitehead A 244S or Indian NST 58 torpedoes)
- Aircraft carried: 2 × Sea King, HAL Dhruv or HAL Chetak helicopters

The Godavari-class frigates (formerly Type 16 or Project 16 frigates) were guided-missile frigates of the Indian Navy. The Godavari class was the first significant indigenous warship design and development initiative of the Indian Navy. Its design is a modification of the Nilgiri class with a focus on indigenous content of 72%, a larger hull and updated armaments. The class and the lead ship, INS Godavari were named after the Godavari River. Subsequent ships in the class, INS Ganga and INS Gomati also took their names from Indian rivers.

INS Gomati was the first Indian Navy vessel to have digital electronics in her combat data system. The ships combined Indian, Russian and Western weapons systems.

== History ==
The concept for the Godavari class originated from the lessons learnt in the Indo-Pakistan War of 1971. There was a need for a ship unique to Indian requirements, for deploying a hybrid of indigenously-designed, as well as Russian and European weapons systems. The keel of the lead ship INS Godavari was laid in 1978 at Mazagon Dock Limited in Bombay. She was commissioned in December 1983.

One of the requirements was to deploy two Sea King helicopters from the ship. The Nilgiri-class vessels were too small for this requirement. The final design incorporated a larger hull in order to accommodate this. INS Godavari was decommissioned on 23 December 2015, and her Barak 1 surface-to-air missile will be installed on the flagship INS Vikramaditya. INS Ganga was retired from active service on 28 May 2017, and was decommissioned on 22 March 2018. The last ship of its class, INS Gomati, was decommissioned on 15 May 2022 after 34 years of service.

== Design ==
Although the Directorate of Marine Engineering suggested replacing steam propulsion with gas turbines, it was decided not to do so, since Bharat Heavy Electricals Limited and Hindustan Aeronautics Limited had made heavy investments in facilities and tooling for design of steam turbines and auxiliary systems.

For armaments, the missile and gun package of the Soviet Nanuchka-class corvette was installed on the frigate. Later on, when the frigates underwent their mid-life overhauls, some of the Soviet systems were replaced by Israeli and Italian systems.

== Ships of the class ==
Name	Pennant	Builder	Laid down	Launched	Commissioned	Decommissioned	Fate
Godavari	F20	Mazagon Dock Limited	3 November 1978	15 May 1980	10 December 1983	23 December 2015	Sunk as target, 2020.
Ganga	F22	Mazagon Dock Limited	1980	21 October 1981	30 December 1985	22 March 2018	Awaiting disposal
Gomati	F21	Mazagon Dock Limited	1981	19 March 1984	16 April 1988	28 May 2022	To be preserved as museum.

== Upgrades ==
All three ships later underwent an extensive upgrade of weapons and sensors. These include the fitment of the Israeli Barak SAM system with a new fire control system based on the EL/M-2221 STGR in place of the original Soviet SA-N-4 SAM system. The P-20 missiles were retained. The Soviet AK-725 main gun was also replaced by an Italian OTO Melara 76 mm gun.

== Gallery ==
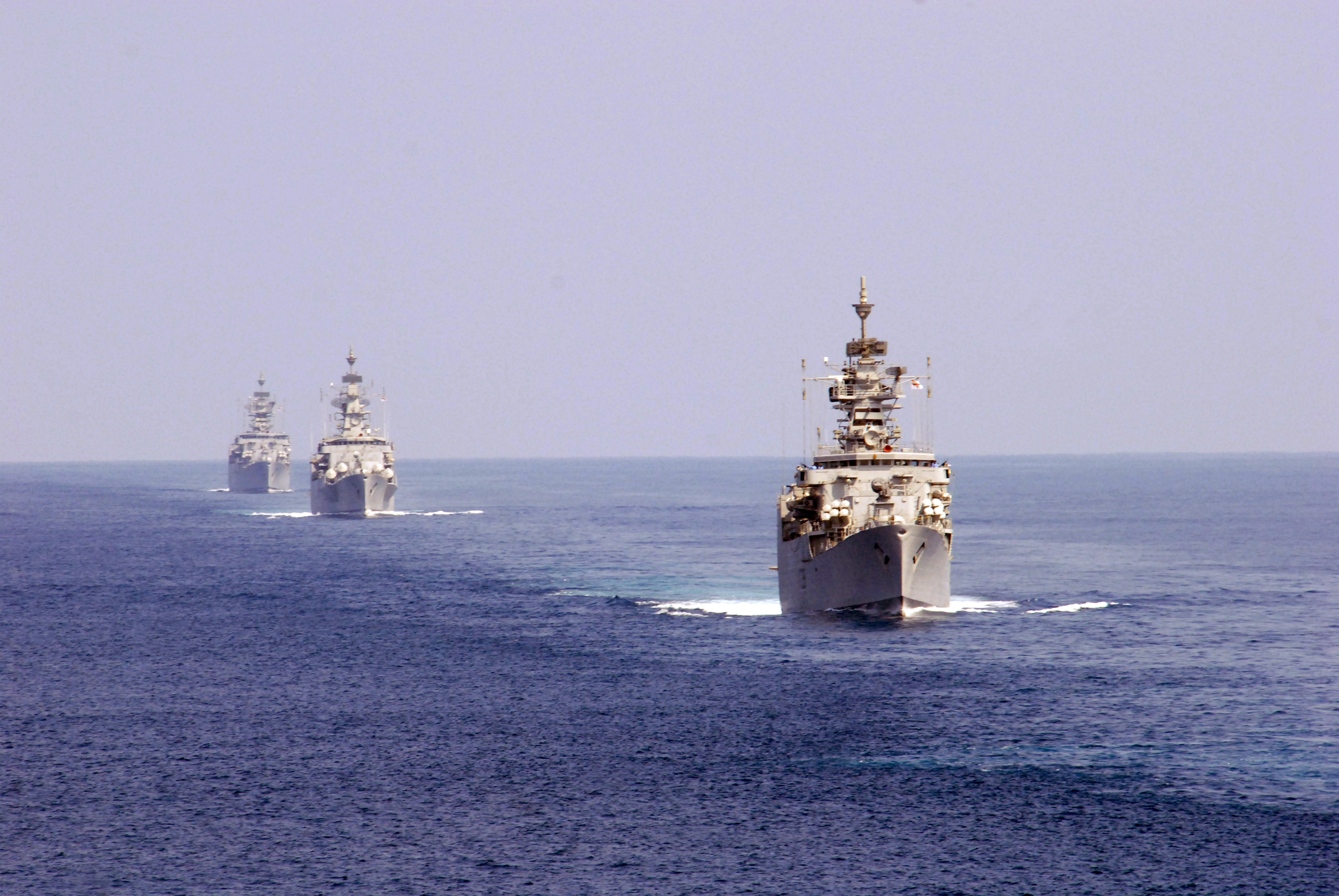
INS Godavari with INS Brahmaputra and INS Beas trailing during exercises with the US Navy.

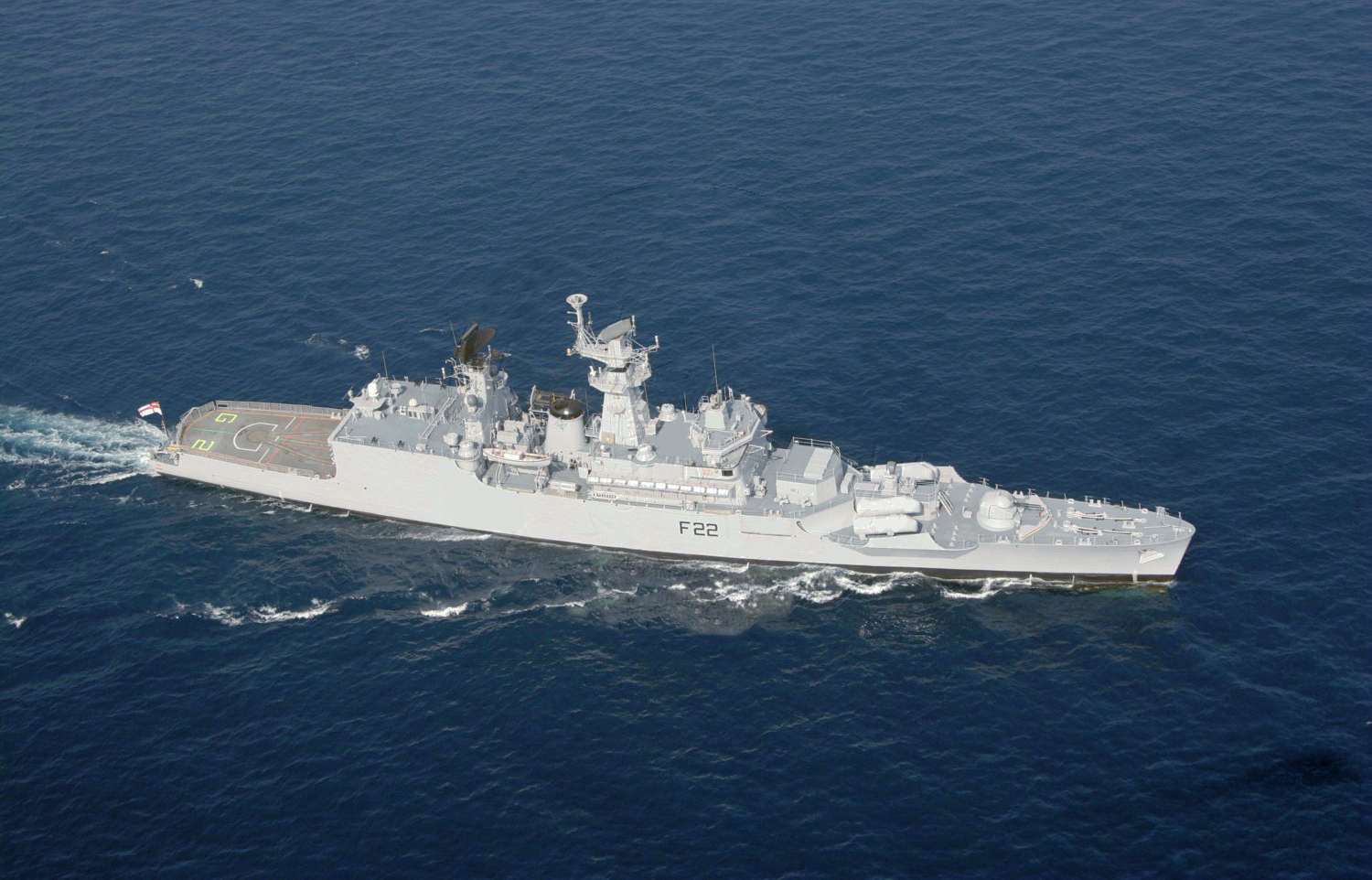
INS Ganga (F22) during sea operations.

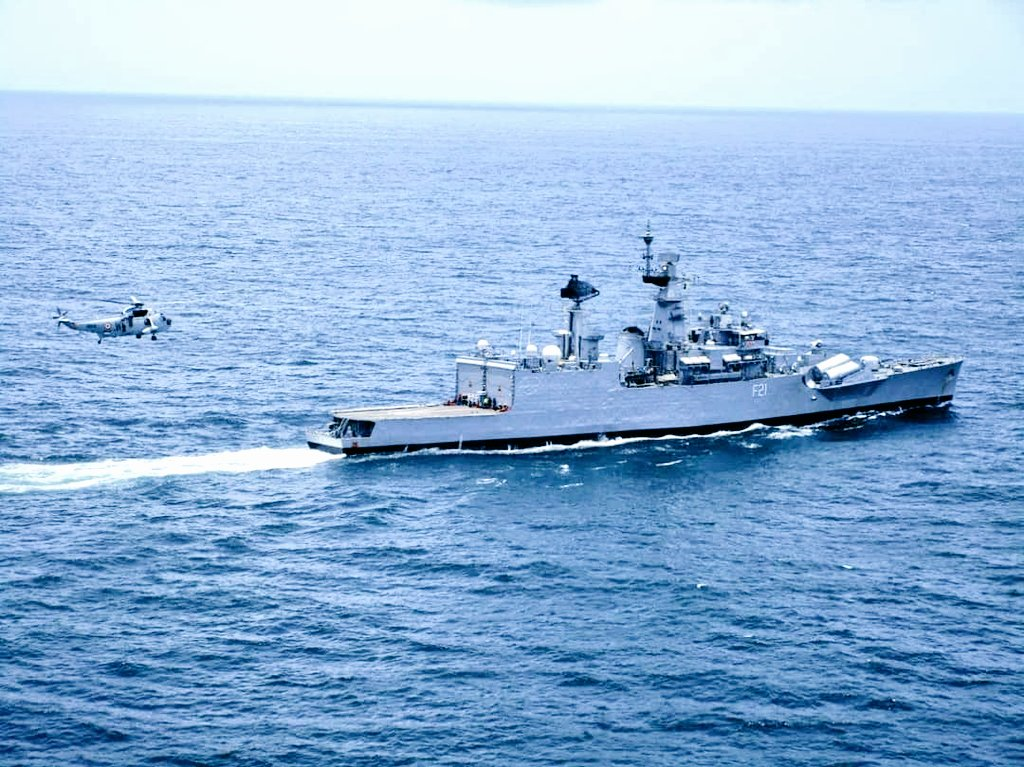
INS Gomati with Seaking helicopter operations.

== See also ==
- List of naval ship classes in service

Equivalent frigates of the same era

- Adelaide class
- Jacob van Heemskerck class
- Santa María class
- Cassard class
- Cheng Kung class
