= INS Betwa (F39) =

Indian Navy frigate

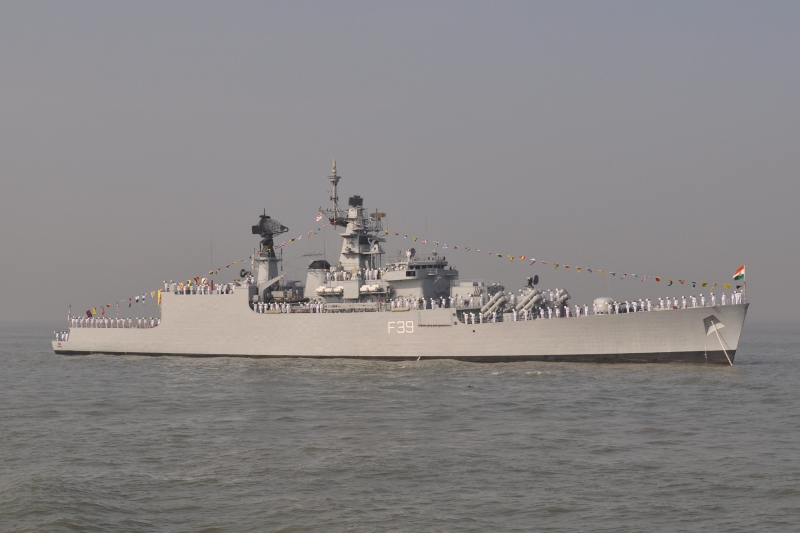
- Betwa at anchor in 2011

History

India
- Name: INS Betwa
- Namesake: Betwa River
- Builder: Garden Reach Shipbuilders & Engineers Ltd. (GRSE)
- Launched: 26 February 1998
- Commissioned: 7 July 2004
- Identification: MMSI number: 419000039; Callsign: AUBW
- Status: Active

General characteristics
- Class & type: Brahmaputra-class guided missile frigate
- Displacement: 3850 tons full load
- Length: 126.4 m (414 ft 8 in)
- Beam: 14.5 m (47 ft 7 in)
- Draught: 4.5 m (14 ft 9 in)
- Propulsion: Two Bhopal turbines, 30,000 hp (22,000 kW), two 550 psi boilers and two shafts
- Speed: In excess of 30 knots (56 km/h; 35 mph)
- Range: 4,500 nautical miles (8,300 km; 5,200 mi) at 12 knots (22 km/h; 14 mph)
- Complement: 440–450 (incl. 40 officers + 13 aircrew)
- Sensors & processing systems: Air/Surface; 1 × AMDR Radar at S-band frequency; Air; 1 × Bharat/Signaal RAWL-02 (PLN 517) D-band radar (LW08 antenna); Navigation; 1 × Decca Bridgemaster; 2 × Vision Master I band radar; Sonar; 1 × Bharat HUMSA sonar; 1 × Thales Sintra sonar
- Electronic warfare & decoys: 2 × Kavach Chaff Launchers; 1 × BEL Radar Warning Receiver Suite
- Armament: 16 × Kh-35 (SS-N-25 Switchblade) AShMs (4 x quadruple KT-184 launchers); 2 × 8 Barak SAM VLS system; 1 × OTO Melara Super Rapid 76mm main gun; 4 × 6-barrelled 30mm AK-630 Gatling guns; 6 × 324mm ILAS 3 (2 x triple tubes) with Whitehead A244S anti-submarine torpedoes
- Aircraft carried: 2 helicopters: 2 Sea King Mk.42B or a; combination of a HAL Chetak and a Sea King Mk.42B
- Aviation facilities: Enclosed helicopter hangar and flight deck capable of accommodating two multi-role helicopters.

INS Betwa (F39) is a Brahmaputra-class guided missile frigate currently in service with the Indian Navy. The ship is named for the Betwa River.

== Service history ==
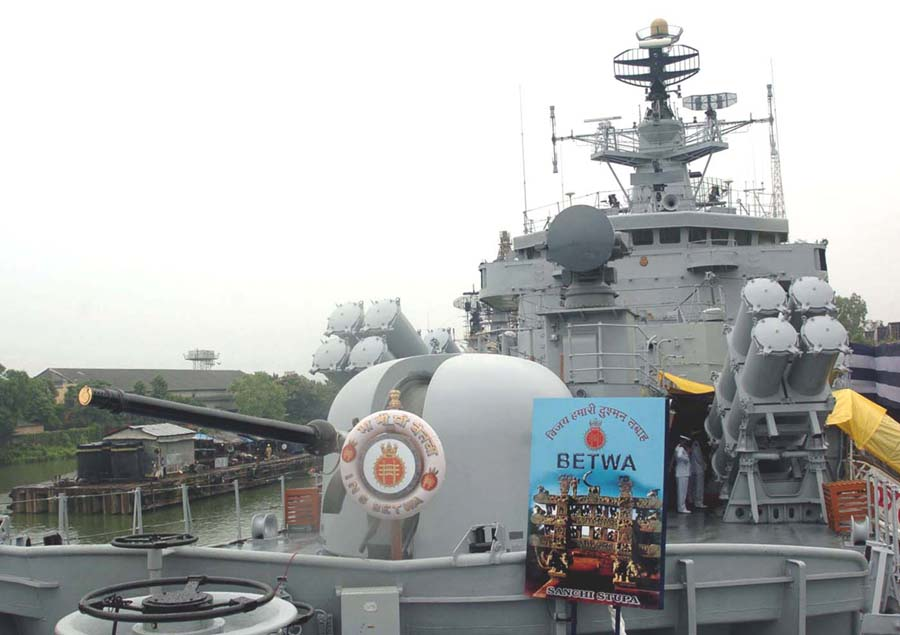
The Chief of Naval Staff Admiral Madhvendra Singh commissioned the INS Betwa, a guided missile frigate built at the Garden Reach Shipbuilders and Engineers, in Kolkata on July 7, 2004

Betwa was a part of Task Force 54, returning from the Mediterranean, when the 2006 Israel-Lebanon Conflict broke out. As a part of Operation Sukoon, Betwa participated in the evacuation of Indian citizens from Lebanon to Cyprus.

On 4 January 2014, the ship hit an unidentified object underwater and cracked the sonar dome, and had also seen salt water ingress into sensitive equipment.

On 5 December 2016, Betwa slipped off support blocks and over onto its port side when refloating and undocking inside the cruiser graving dock at the Naval Dockyard in Mumbai during refit repairs, killing 2 sailors and injuring 15 others. The ship's main mast was also damaged.

Sources initially reported that the salvage and repair of the ship would take approximately two years. Resolve Marine Engineering, a US-based firm, was contracted to salvage the flooded vessel in January 2017 for a sum of Rs. 20 Crore (200 million Indian Rupees, approximately USD 3 million at the time).

On 22 February 2017, it was reported that the ship was made upright and refloated. Betwa was restored to an upright position by the US salvage company by systematically flooding and pumping her compartments without using any external lifting mechanisms. Three Naval Officers were court martialed and found guilty of negligence.

It was reported on 10 January 2021 that a 22 year old sailor on the ship died from a bullet injury, allegedly due to suicide.The ship took part in search and rescue operations in the wake of Cyclone Tauktae in May 2021.

INS Betwa is to undergo a mid life refit after 2026, with only the DAC approval pending. On 11 November, the Ministry of Defence signed a contract with Cochin Shipyard for the normal refit and re-powering of Betwa. Under the re-powering of the frigate, the steam-based propulsion will be replaced by a diesel engine-based system. A modernised weapon suite will also be installed during the refit.
