= Mazagon Dock Shipbuilders =

Shipyard in Mumbai, India

Coordinates: 18.96713°N 72.84993°E

Mazagon Dock Shipbuilders Limited
- Formerly: Mazagon Dock Limited
- Type: Public
- Traded as: BSE: 543237; NSE: MAZDOCK
- Industry: Shipbuilding
- Founded: 1934; 92 years ago
- Headquarters: Mumbai, Maharashtra, India
- Key people: Capt Jagmohan (Retd) (Chairman & MD)
- Products: Naval ships Submarines offshore platforms Tankers; Bulk carriers Platform supply vessels Patrol boats
- Services: Ship design Ship building Ship repair
- Revenue: ▲₹14,145.7 crore (US$1.5 billion) (FY2026)
- Operating income: ▲₹3,228 crore (US$340 million) (2025)
- Net income: ▲₹2,324 crore (US$240 million) (2025)
- Total assets: ▼₹28,707 crore (US$3.0 billion) (2025)
- Total equity: ▲₹7,939 crore (US$820 million) (2025)
- Owner: Government of India (81.2%)
- Number of employees: 6,327 (2024)
- Divisions: Shipbuilding, Submarine & Heavy Engineering
- Subsidiaries: Colombo Dockyard (51%)
- Website: mazagondock.in
- Footnotes; Financials as of 31 March 2025.

Mazagon Dock Shipbuilders Limited (MDSL) (IAST: Majhagānv Dawk Shipbuilders Limiṭeḍ) is a public shipyard in Mazagaon, Mumbai. It manufactures warships and submarines for the Indian Navy and offshore platforms and associated support vessels for offshore oil drilling. It also builds tankers, cargo bulk carriers, passenger ships and ferries.

MDL is a public sector undertaking managed by the Ministry of Defence, with the Government of India holding an 80.82% stake. Its shipbuilding segment has indigenously built stealth frigates, destroyers, guided-missile destroyers, corvettes, landing platform docks, missile boats, patrol boats, trailing suction hopper dredgers, cargo ships, cargo-passenger ships, platform supply vessels, Voith tugs and BOP vessels, while its submarine segment has built conventional submarines and stealth submarines. Both segments have also performed repair and refit activities.

== History ==
The company's shipyards were established in the 18th century. Ownership of the yards passed through entities including the Peninsular and Oriental Steam Navigation Company and the British-India Steam Navigation Company. Eventually, 'Mazagon Dock Limited' was registered as a public company in 1934.

The shipyard was nationalised in 1960 and is now a public sector undertaking (PSU) of the Government of India. In 2024, it became India's 18th PSU to receive the Navratna status from the Indian government.

Captain Jagmohan, IN (Retd), is the Chairman & Managing Director (CMD) of Mazagon Dock Shipbuilders Limited. The retired naval officer took over his current position on 21 April 2025. He will lead the company until his retirement on 30 September 2029. The former Navy captain has earlier served as the Director, Corporate Planning, Projects and Business Development at Goa Shipyard Limited.

As of April 2025, Mazagon Dock Shipbuilders Limited is negotiating to acquire a majority stake of Colombo Dockyard PLC (CDPLC). MDL will reportedly purchase 51% stakes from Japan's Onomichi Dockyard Co. Ltd. after the continuous losses from CDPLC. A memorandum of understanding (MoU) is expected by the end of the month. The acquisition worth ₹249.5 crore (US$26 million) was completed by April 2026. The board of Colombo Shipyard has already been re-constituted with MDL members with effect from 7 April with the CMD, MDL being appointed as the Non-Executive Chairman.

The dockyard was originally established 1774 while it was acquired by the Government of India in 1960 and celebrated its 250th anniversary in 2024. As of date, the yard has built 806 platforms overall including 31 capital warships and eight submarines along with an export record of 243 vessels to international clients. The shipyard will also expected to play a major role in the Indian Navy's goal to reach a size of 175 Capital Ships with 100% indigenisation within 2047.

== Activities ==
The company's activities are shipbuilding, submarine building, and fabrication of offshore structures. It has manufacturing facilities on both the Mumbai peninsula and on the mainland.

The yard can build warships, submarines, and merchant ships up to 30,000 tonnes deadweight (DWT). It can also fabricate wellhead platforms, process and production platforms, and jack-up rigs for oil exploration.

As of 2025, the shipyard has the capacity to handle 11 submarines and 10 warships at a time.

Beside the existing facility, MDL developed a shipbuilding cum ship repair facility on 15 acres (61,000 m^{2}) of land which is leased from Mumbai Port Authority for 29 years. As reported in July 2025, shipbuilding operations have commenced in the facility,

=== Expansion ===
The shipyard has expansion plans worth ₹4,000−5,000 crore (equivalent to ₹−52 billion or US$−540 million in 2026) to focus on securing and executing export orders. Of this, a major share of over ₹1,000 crore (equivalent to ₹10 billion or US$110 million in 2026) is to be invested at its 40-acre-Nhava facility near Mumbai. This includes development of jetty and a facility for holding the vessel, dredging, and other associated works. MDL has awarded a contract worth ₹475 crore (equivalent to ₹491 crore or US$51 million in 2026) to private-run Shoft Shipyard in Gujarat to erect a floating dry dock in the facility. Six blocks are to be built by Shoft, which will be transported to Nhava for erection. As of now, 4 blocks has been completed. The dock will have dimensions 180 m (590 ft) by 44 m (144 ft) by 19.5 m (64 ft) in length, breadth and height, respectively and will be able to handle eight 12,800 tonne-class ships simultaneously. The dock will be used for the construction and repair of larger commercial ships as well as for the Next Generation Destroyers.

As of July 2025, it is being reported that MDL will also reclaim 10 acres (40,000 m^{2}) in its Mumbai facility to create two new basins for the simultaneous construction of larger ships and submarines. The overall expansion would double the shipyard's deadweight handling capacity from 40,000 tonnes to 80,000 tonnes. With the additional 37 acres (0.15 km^{2}) of land acquired at Nhava Sheva port, MDL aims to achieve a deadweight handling capacity from 2 lakh tonnes. The Ministry of Defence ensured that this facility will ensure the timely construction as well as the repair and overhaul of warships.

In the same month, the Maharashtra Coastal Zone Management Authority (MCZMA) also cleared Mazagon's bid to construct the floating dry dock since there will be minimal influence on the tidal regime and coastline since the mangroves around Nhava Island are positioned at a significant distance. As per the project's Environmental Impact Assessment (EIA) report, MDL will construct a temporary "launching facility" on the northern end of its Nhava facility to assemble the dry docks parts that will arrive from Gujarat's Shoft Shipyard. This region is ideal for this launching facility since it demands protections from wave and the Elephanta Island comprises a headland.

There are also plans to erect another graving dry dock of approximately 180 m (590 ft) by 60 m (200 ft) dimensions, and other ancillary facilities to double up shipbuilding and ship repairs capacity. Additionally, the new submarine orders could be executed in the existing facilities due to their inherently smaller dimensions.

March 2026, aligning with the government’s maritime development plans, it is exploring expansion into large commercial shipbuilding, potentially in partnership with South Korean or Japanese firms.

=== Colombo Dockyard acquisition ===
The Mazagon Dock Shipbuilders, in its regulatory filing on 27 June 2025, announced its decision of acquisition of a controlling (51%) stake in Sri Lankan peer Colombo Dockyard in a deal worth up to ₹450 crore (equivalent to ₹465 crore or US$48 million in 2026) in order to grow its shipbuilding and repair business.The transaction will be completed within six months following which the Sri Lankan shipbuilder will become a part of Mazagon Dock Shipbuilders. At the end of November 2024, Japan's Onomichi Dockyard exited its majority stake in Colombo Dockyard. Following this, Colombo reportedly sought New Delhi's assistance in encouraging Indian investment to avoid default. Mazagon Dock Shipbuilders Ltd was subsequently shortlisted due to its shipbuilding experience and financial capability.

=== Dugarajapatnam shipyard ===
On 18 September 2026, the National Shipbuilding and Heavy Industries Park of Andhra Pradesh (NSHIP-AP) signed a memorandum of understanding (MoU) with Mazagon Dock Shipbuilders for the construction of a greenfield shipyard at the Dugarajapatnam Port. The project is expected to generate an direct and indirect employment to around 45,000 people. Mazagon is expected to invest around ₹15,000 crore (US$1.6 billion) over the next 5–7 years. It is part of the proposed greenfield shipbuilding-cum-port cluster at Dugarajapatnam. The shipbuilding and repair facility will be designed to produce 1.2 million gross tonnage (GT) per annum to build commercial vessels like tankers, bulk carriers, container ships and LNG carriers. The NSHIP-AP is a special purpose vehicle formed by the Andhra Pradesh Maritime Board and the Visakhapatnam Port Authority formed under the Centre’s Shipbuilding Development Scheme.

== Naval projects ==
=== Warships ===
==== Nilgiri-class frigate (1972) ====
The first warship built by MDL was the 2,900-ton displacement INS Nilgiri, the lead ship of her class. She was launched on 15 October 1966 and commissioned on 23 June 1972. Five more frigates of this class were built over the next nine years for the Indian Navy.

==== Godavari-class frigate ====
While construction of the Nilgiri class was being completed, the Indian Navy proposed requirements for an indigenously designed and built frigate. This new frigate was to be of wholly Indian design and manufacture. To address these requirements, MDL designed and built the Godavari-class guided-missile frigates with a 3,800-tonne displacement and the ability to embark two helicopters. MDL built three ships of the class – the lead ship, INS Godavari, INS Ganga, and INS Gomati.

==== Khukri-class corvettes ====
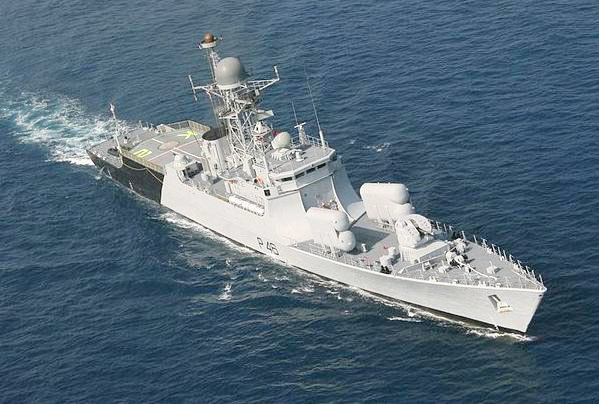
INS Kuthar

MDL designed and built the first two vessels of the Khukri-class corvettes for the Indian Navy. The lead vessel of the class was commissioned on 23 August 1989, and the second, INS Kuthar, on 7 June 1990. The remainder of the class was built at Garden Reach Shipbuilders and Engineers (GRSE) following a transfer of technology from MDL to diversify warship building capabilities to other yards, as well as to make room at MDL for larger projects.

==== Delhi-class destroyers ====
The next class of vessels designed and built by MDL was Project 15 Delhi-class guided-missile destroyers. These were powered by gas turbines and displaced 6,200 tonnes. The first of the class, INS Delhi, was launched in February 1991 and commissioned on 15 November 1997. The second, INS Mysore, was commissioned on 2 June 1999, followed by the last ship in the series, INS Mumbai, on 22 January 2001.

==== Shivalik-class frigates ====
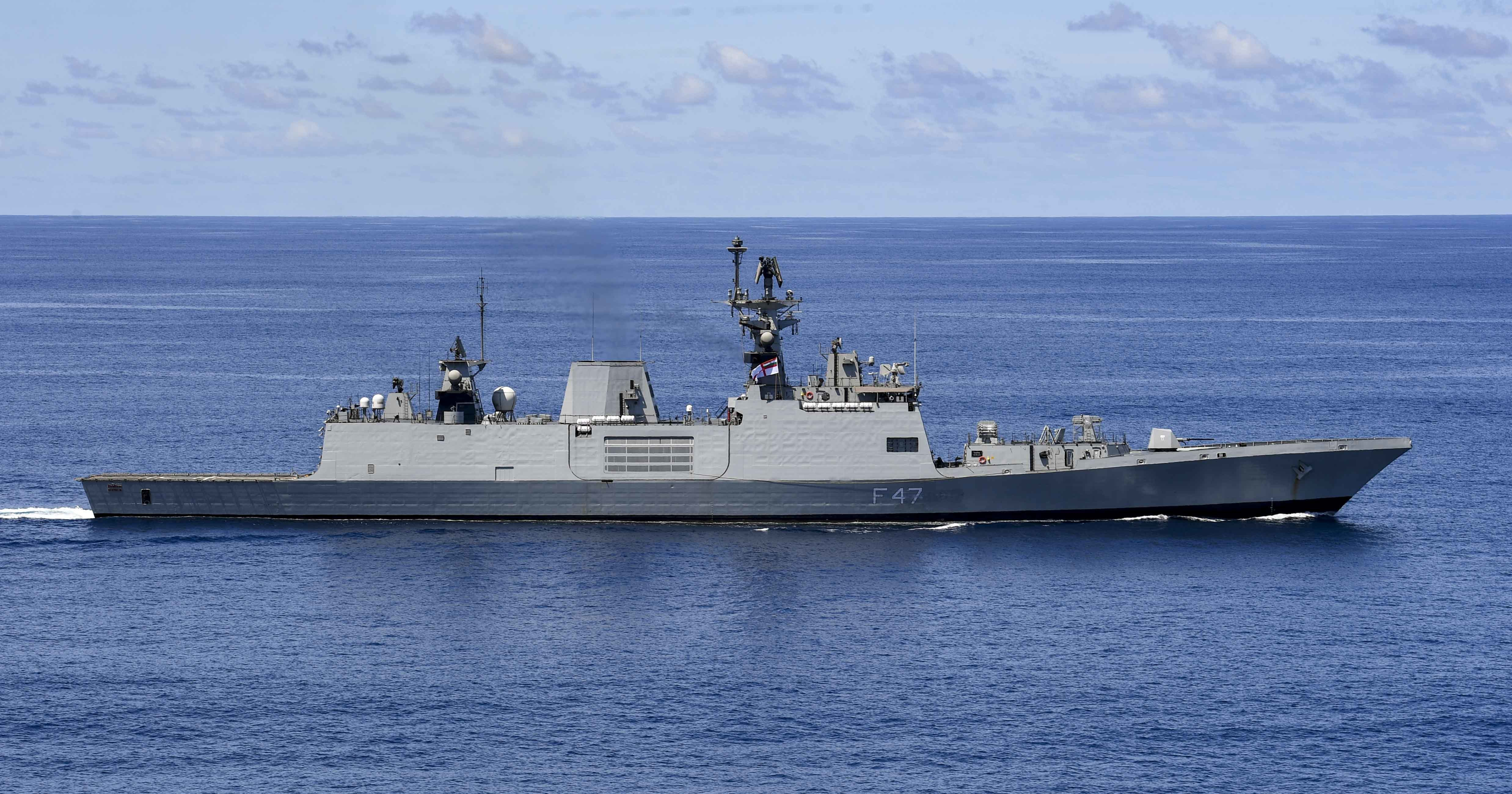
INS Shivalik

The 6000-ton Shivalik-class (Project 17) frigates are the first warships with stealth features to be designed and built in India. These multi-role, guided-missile frigates have reduced radar signatures and have entered service from 2010 onwards. At least three of this class have been constructed at MDL. The lead vessel of the class was commissioned on 29 April 2010. The last ship of the class, INS Sahyadri, was launched on 27 May 2005 and commissioned on 21 July 2012.

==== Kolkata-class destroyers ====
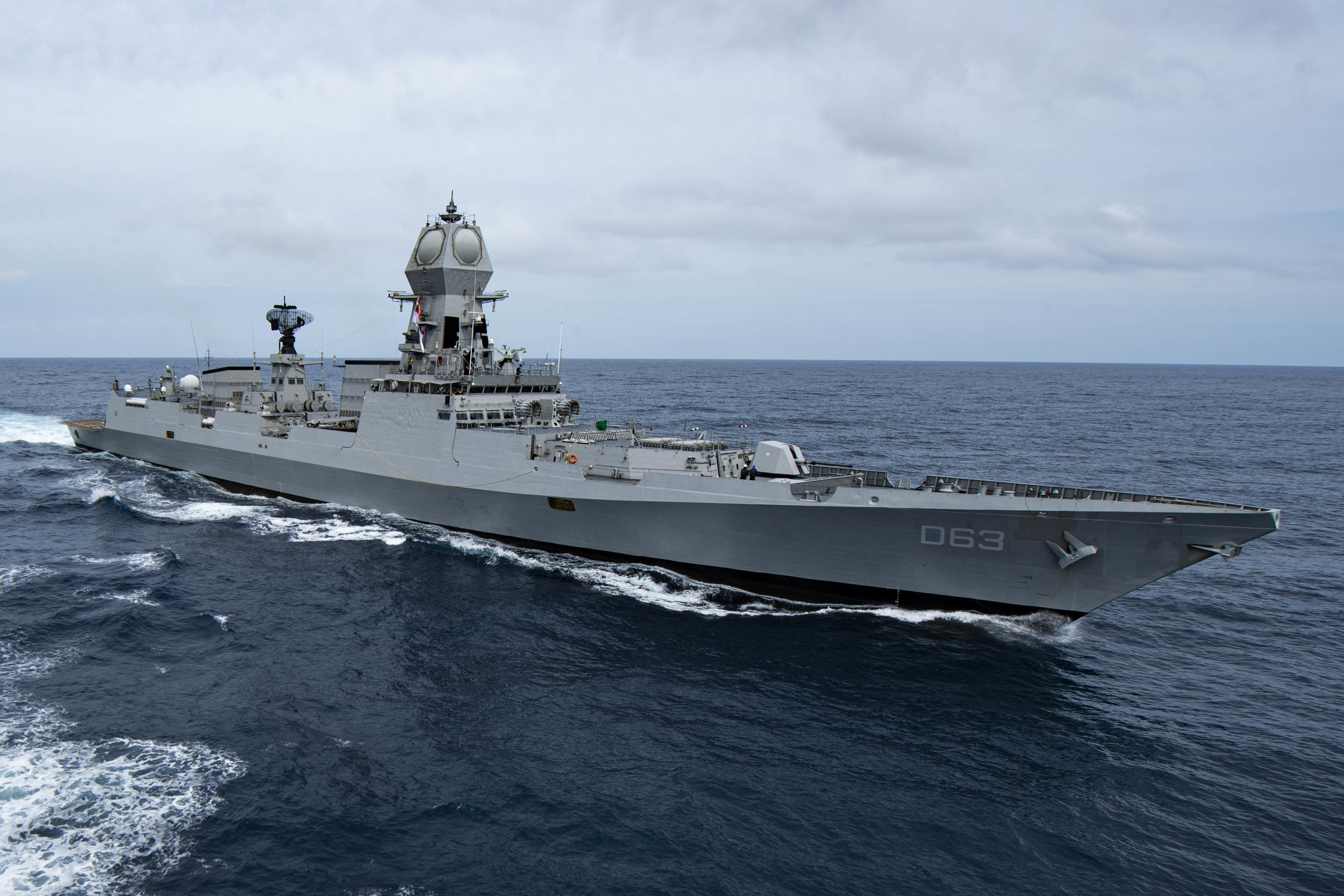
INS Kolkata

Kolkata-class vessels are the next-generation of guided-missile destroyers in the 7,400-tonne range to be designed and built at MDL. They incorporate stealth features. The lead vessel of the class was launched on 30 March 2006. At least three vessels of the class were planned. All three are in active service.

==== Visakhapatnam-class destroyers ====
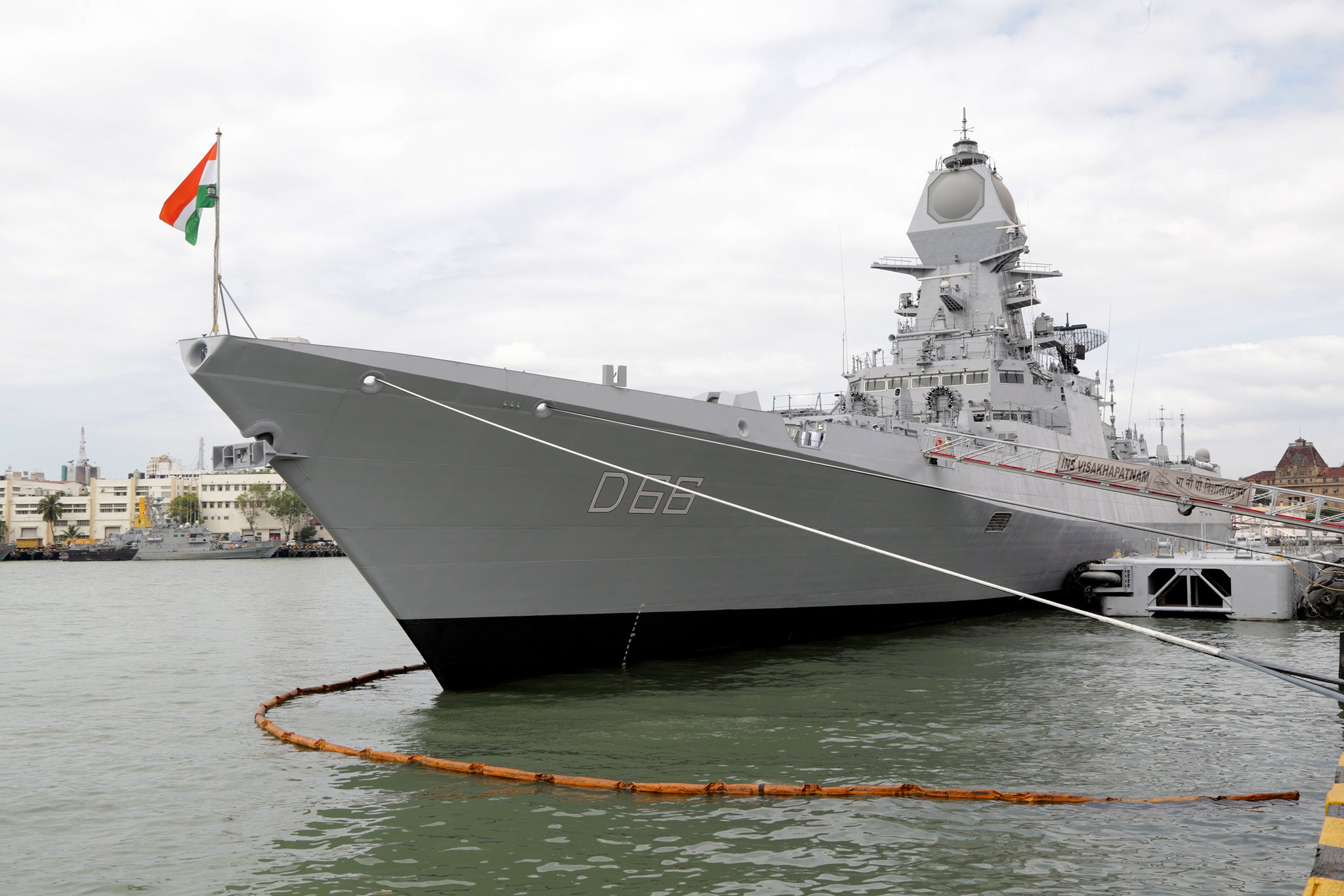
INS Visakhapatnam

Visakhapatnam-class vessels are the next-generation of guided-missile destroyers in the 7,500-tonne range to be designed and built at MDL. They incorporate stealth features and improved weapons and avionics compared to the Kolkata class. The lead vessel of the class was launched in 2018. At least four vessels of the class are planned.

==== Nilgiri-class frigates ====
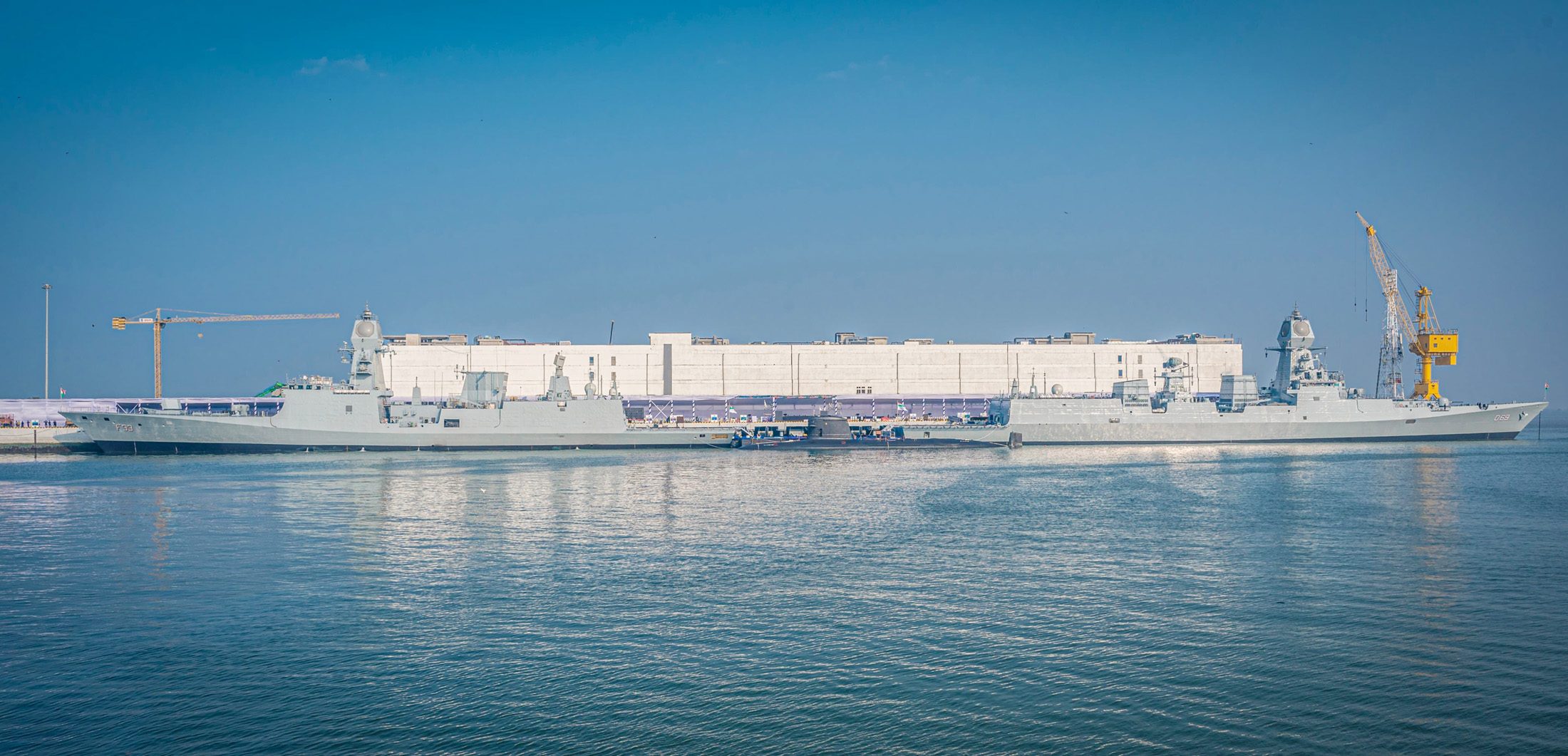
INS Nilgiri, INS Surat and INS Vagsheer during their commissioning at MDL

Nilgiri class vessels are the next-generation of guided-missile frigates in the 6,500-tonne range to be designed and built at MDL and GRSE. They incorporate stealth features. The lead vessel of the class was launched on 28 September 2019. Seven vessels of the class were built by MDL and GRSE. INS Mahendragiri, the seventh and final ship of the class was launched in Mumbai on 1 September 2023.

==== Coast Guard vessels ====
The yard builds offshore patrol vessels (OPVs) for the Indian Coast Guard. These vessels are specialised ships built for patrolling, policing, and search and rescue operations in India's exclusive economic zone. Each carries a helicopter on board. Seven such ships have been delivered.

==== Floating police stations ====
Based on the order from the Border Security Force (BSF), the yard started construction of floating border outposts (BOPs). Essentially these BOPs are floating police stations with four high-speed boats. The yard has delivered 9 out of an order of 14 BOPs.

==== Other vessels ====
Among other ships, the yard has built three fast missile boats, a cadet training ship, and other utility ships for the Indian Navy. It has also built Kangan class water tankers for the Iranian naval forces.

=== Submarines ===
==== Shishumar-class submarine ====
The Shishumar-class submarines are a variant of the Type 209 diesel-electric submarine designed by Howaldtswerke-Deutsche Werft. Two vessels of this class were constructed at MDL, which are the first indigenously built submarines in India. INS Shalki was commissioned on 7 February 1992 and INS Shankul was commissioned on 28 May 1994.

==== Kalvari-class submarine ====
MDL has built six diesel-electric submarines of the Kalvari class under a technology-transfer agreement with Naval Group. INS Kalvari, the first in this class, was commissioned on 14 December 2017 from Naval Dockyard in Mumbai.

=== US Navy ===
In September 2023, MDL became the second Indian shipyard after the Kattupalli Shipyard of Larsen & Toubro to sign a Master Ship Repair Agreement (MSRA) with the US Government, represented by NAVSUP Fleet Logistics Center (FLC) Yokosuka, for United States Navy's Military Sealift Command Fleet Support Ships. The ships operated by MSC are non-commissioned US Navy “support vessels” with civilian crews bearing the prefix “USNS”. Under the agreement, the US Naval ships of the Central Command that are in voyage are to be repaired in India.

=== Upcoming projects ===
==== P-75(I) submarine ====
MDL's joint venture with ThyssenKrupp, a German conglomerate, is the sole contender for the Indian Navy's P-75(I) submarine program. Commercial negotiations with the Ministry of Defence began in January 2025.

== Commercial projects ==
=== Offshore platforms ===
MDL builds offshore oil drilling platforms. It operates facilities at Alcock, Mumbai, and Nhava Yard for the construction of platforms with wellhead, water injection and production separator and glycol process capabilities, as well as jackup rigs, SBMs and other offshore structures.

Repair and maintenance jobs on offshore rigs are undertaken at Alcock; jackets up to 80 metres (260 ft) length and 2,200-tonne weight can be constructed. At Nhava, jackets up to 80 metres (260 ft) length and 2,300-tonne weight, main decks up to 550-tonne weight, and helipads of 160-tonne weight can be constructed.

The yard builds specialist vessels able to clean oil spills and fight fires on offshore drilling platforms.

A welding training school develops and maintains welding techniques and procedures.

== See also ==
- Cochin Shipyard
- Colombo Dockyard
- Garden Reach Shipbuilders and Engineers
- Goa Shipyard Limited
- Hindustan Shipyard
