= United Nations Security Council Resolution 954 =

UN Security Council Resolution 954
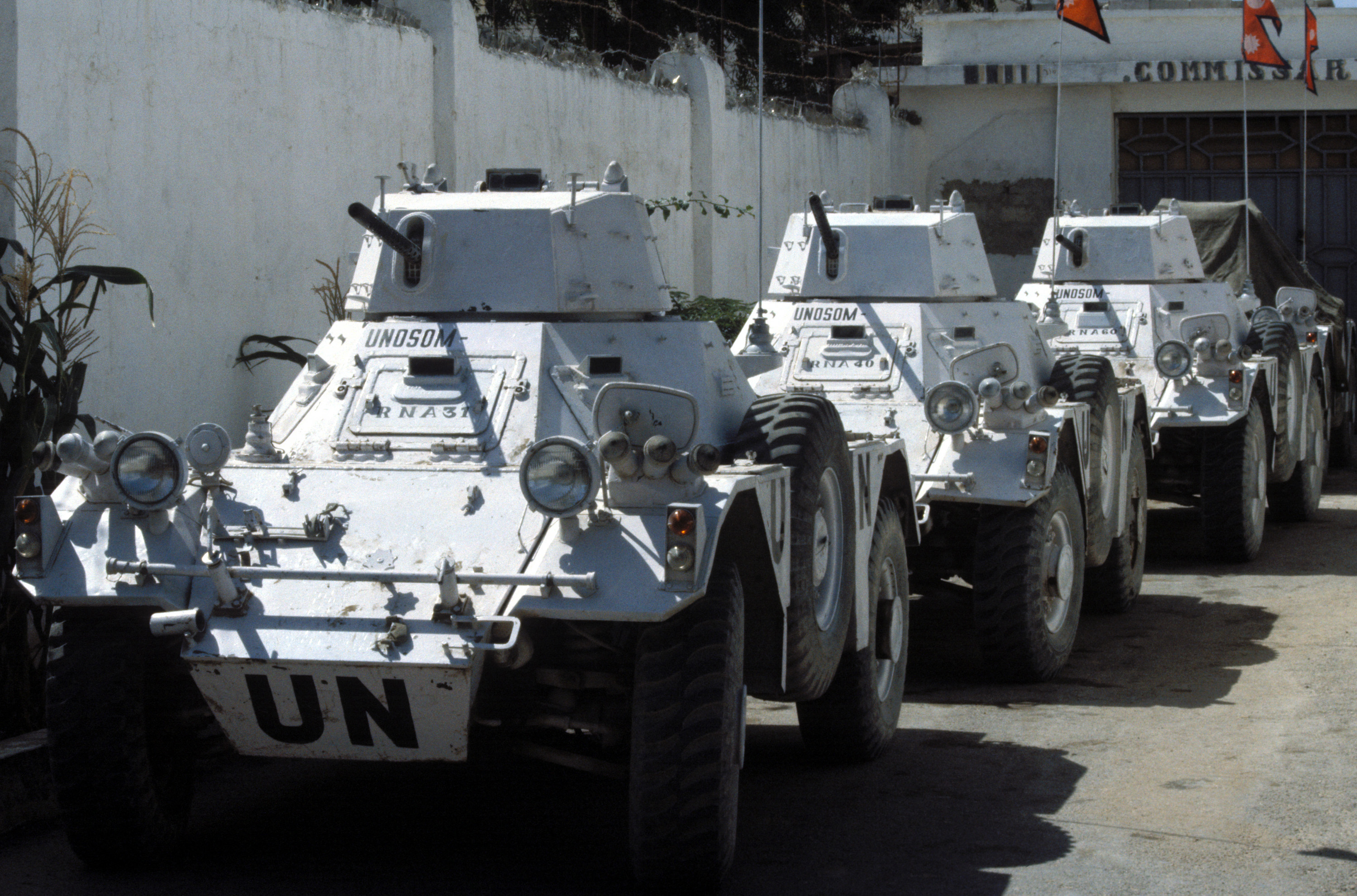
- Nepalese UNOSOM armoured cars
- Date: 4 November 1994
- Meeting no.: 3,447
- Code: S/RES/954 (Document)
- Subject: Somalia
- Voting summary: 15 voted for; None voted against; None abstained
- Result: Adopted

Security Council composition
- Permanent members: China; France; Russia; United Kingdom; United States
- Non-permanent members: Argentina; Brazil; Czech Republic; Djibouti; New Zealand; Nigeria; Oman; Pakistan; Rwanda; Spain

United Nations Security Council resolution 954, adopted unanimously on 4 November 1994, after recalling Resolution 733 (1992) and all relevant resolutions on the situation in Somalia and a recent security council mission to the country, the Council noted the lack of progress in the peace process and decided, under Chapter VII of the United Nations Charter, to extend the mandate of the United Nations Operation in Somalia II for a final time, until 31 March 1995.

The security council appreciated the efforts of the mission sent to convey the views of the council to the Somali parties, and commended the work of thousands of personnel involved in the Unified Task Force (UNITAF), UNOSOM II and humanitarian efforts. It noted that hundreds of thousands of lives had been saved from starvation. At the same time the council acknowledged that the lack of co-operation between the Somali parties and factions undermined the United Nations objectives in Somalia and therefore the continuation of UNOSOM II beyond the end of March 1995 was not justified. There were guarantees from the Somali parties that they would co-operate and not interfere with the withdrawal of UNOSOM II. The United Nations would continue mediation in Somalia, in co-operation with the Organisation of African Unity, Arab League and Organisation of the Islamic Conference and the provision of humanitarian aid would also be sustained.

By extending UNOSOM II's mandate for a final time, its main objective was to facilitate political reconciliation. All Somali factions were urged to negotiate and establish a transitional government of national unity. The parties also had to guarantee the safety of UNOSOM II and humanitarian personnel, authorising UNOSOM II to take action in order to protect its withdrawal. All Member States were called upon to continue to support the Somali peace process and to strictly observe the arms embargo on the country imposed in Resolution 733. Finally, the Secretary-General Boutros Boutros-Ghali was requested to report to the council on the developments in all areas of Somalia before 31 March 1995, and to recommend suggestions on the role that the United Nations could play in Somalia after that date.

The last UNOSOM troops withdrew from Somalia on 3 March 1995. It marked the first time that the United Nations left a country without completing its aims.

== See also ==
- History of Somalia
- List of United Nations Security Council Resolutions 901 to 1000 (1994–1995)
- Somali Civil War
