= Barak 1 =

Barak I
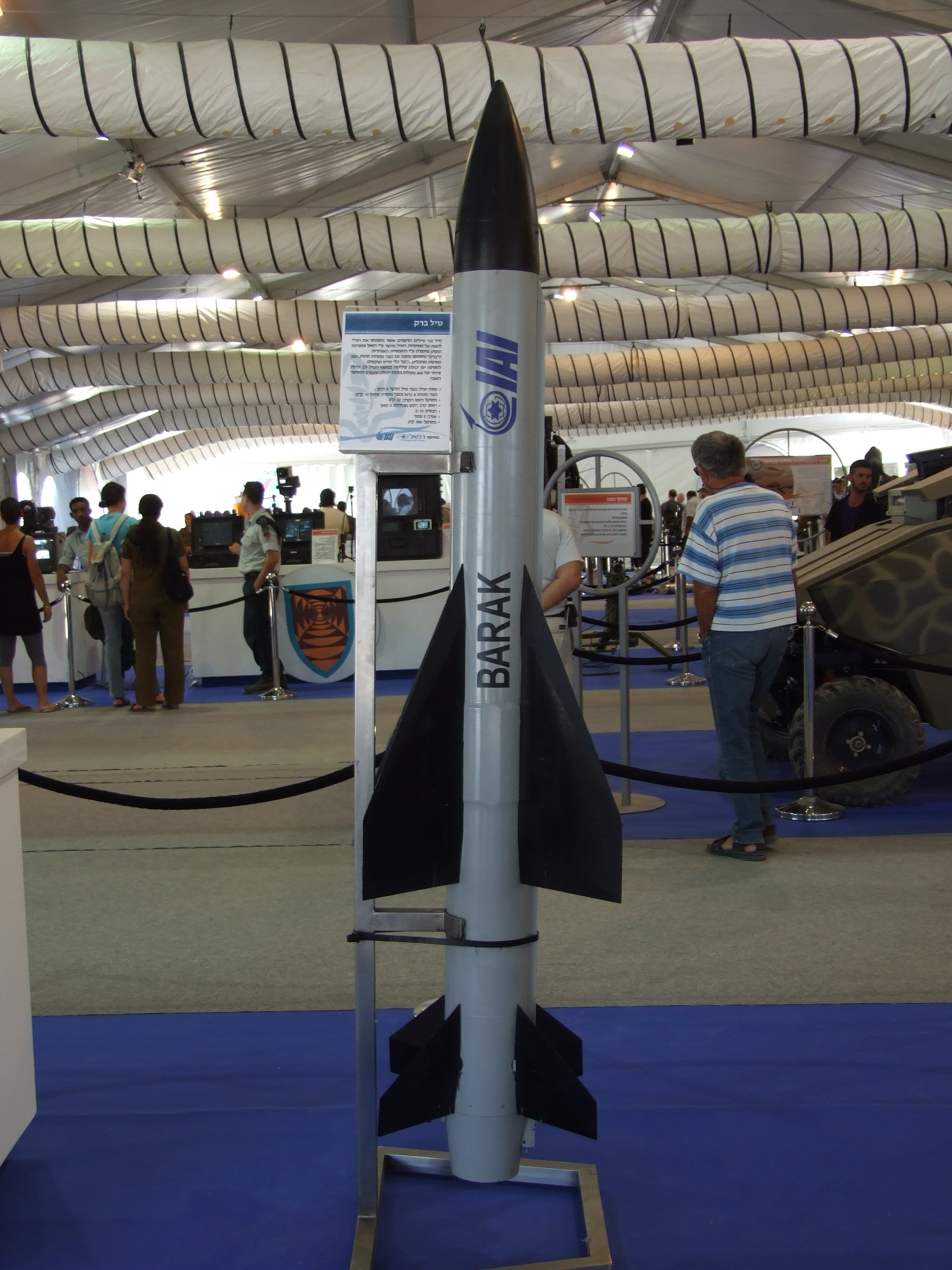
- Barak 1
- Type: SAM-based CIWS
- Place of origin: Israel

Production history
- Manufacturer: Israel Aerospace Industries (IAI) & Rafael Advanced Defense Systems

Specifications
- Mass: 98 kg (216 lb)
- Length: 2.1 m (6.9 ft)
- Diameter: 170 mm (6.7 in)
- Wingspan: 685 mm (27.0 in)
- Warhead: 22 kg (49 lb) blast fragmentation warhead
- Detonation mechanism: Proximity fuse
- Operational range: 0.5–12 km (0.3–7.5 mi)
- Flight altitude: 5.5 km (18,000 ft)
- Maximum speed: Mach 2.1 (720 m/s (1,600 mph))
- Guidance system: Radar CLOS guidance
- Launch platform: Surface Ship

Barak (Hebrew: ברק, lightning) is an Israeli surface-to-air missile (SAM) based CIWS designed to be used as a ship-borne point-defense missile system against aircraft, anti-ship missiles, and UAVs.

== Design ==
The Barak SAM system is designed to replace or complement gun-based CIWS platforms, such as the Phalanx CIWS, with a more flexible and longer-range SAM. The missiles are mounted in an eight cell container (which requires little maintenance) and are launched straight up. The Barak SAM system's launcher uses a compact vertical launching system, with an 8-cell module weighing 1,700 kg (3,700 lb). Fire control is provided by an equally compact C3I system that weighs 1,300 kg (2,900 lb), which can either operate independently or in conjunction with other on-board sensors. Its C3I radar system provides 360-degree coverage and the missiles can take down an incoming missile as close as 500 metres (1,600 ft) away from the ship. Each Barak system (missile container, radar, computers and installation) costs about $24 million.

The system is designed to defend against aircraft and anti-ship missiles, including sea-skimming missiles.

== Indian Navy service ==
The missile was tested on 24 March 2017 by the Indian Navy from INS Vikramaditya during Operation Readiness Inspection in the Arabian Sea.

The Defence Acquisition Council (DAC) has cleared two projects for upgradation of Barak 1 point-defence missile system as well as the Saksham anti-air missile system of the Indian Air Force including the latter's integration with the IACCS in August 2025. The Indian Ministry of Defence awarded a contract for upgradation and obsolescence management of Barak Point Defence Missile System to the Israel Aerospace Industries (IAI) on 18 November 2026 at cost of ₹1,976.40 crore (US$210 million). The project involves "comprehensive upgrade of hardware and software of the system".

== Operators ==
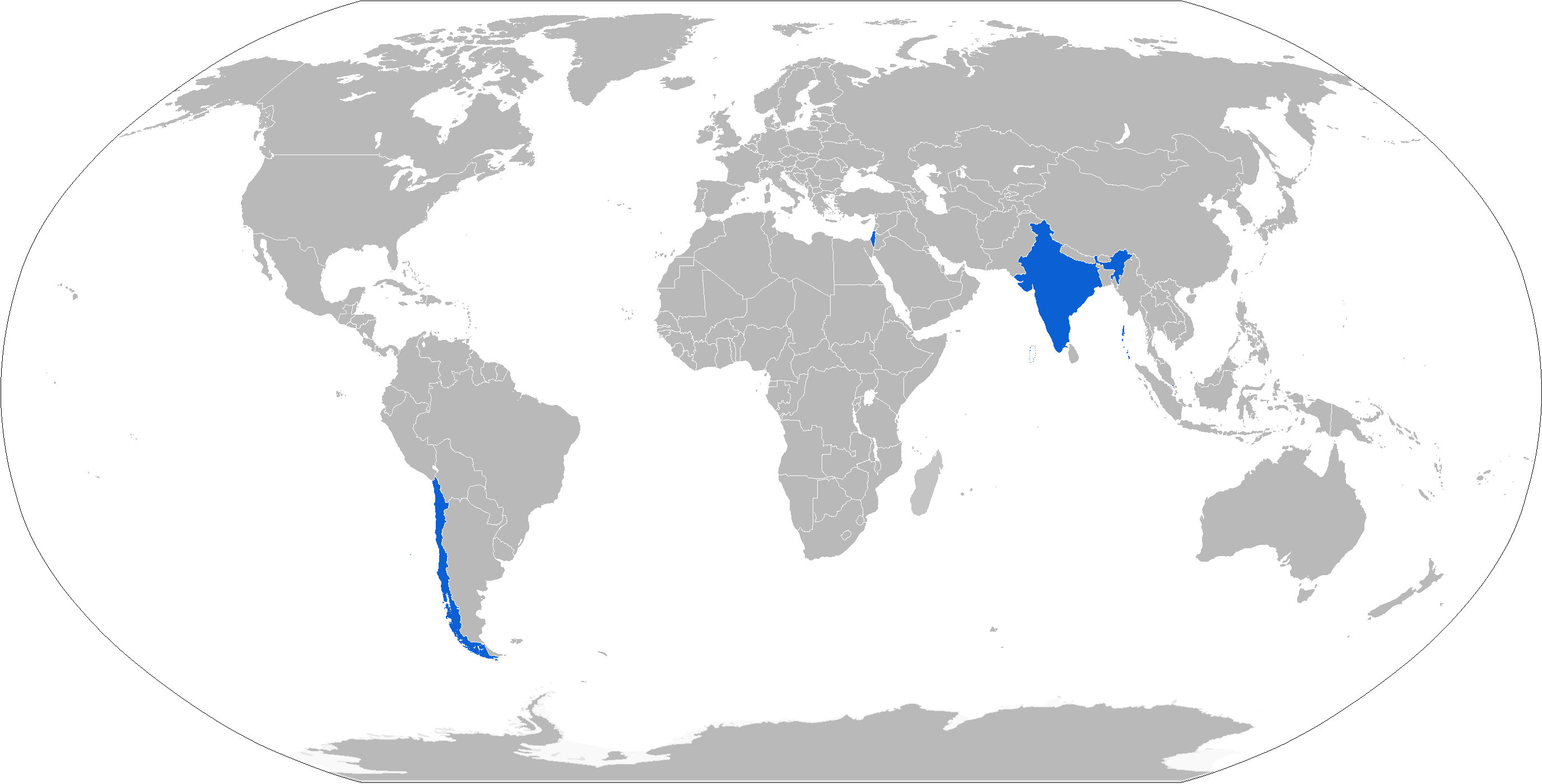
Map of Barak 1 operators in blue

=== Current ===
- Chile - Chilean frigate Almirante Williams
- India -
  - Indian Navy: Total 15 warships of which 11 are operational, includes:
    - INS Vikramaditya (Aircraft Carrier)
    - INS Viraat (Aircraft Carrier) -- decommissioned
    - Delhi-class destroyer
    - Rajput-class destroyer -- INS Ranvir, INS Ranvijay
    - Shivalik-class frigate
    - Brahmaputra-class frigate
    - Godavari-class frigate (decommissioned)
- Israel
- Singapore
- Cyprus

=== Former ===
- Venezuela

== Indian Barak Missile scandal ==
On 23 October 2000, contracts were signed between the Government of India to procure seven Barak 1 systems for a $199.50 million and 200 missiles for $69.13 million reportedly over the objections of various groups, including A. P. J. Abdul Kalam, the head of the Defence Research and Development Organisation. While some objections were of a procedural nature, Indian Navy chief Admiral Sushil Kumar was investigated for why the objections that the deal was overpriced and processed on a single-tender basis were not considered.

On 24 December 2013, after investigating for more than seven years, the Central Bureau of Investigation closed the case and filed a report in court that it did not find any evidence on the allegations. A day before, on 23 December, Minister of Defence A. K. Antony approved the procurement of an additional 262 Barak 1 missiles for ₹880 crore (US$94 million).

== See also ==
- GÖKSUR
- Tor missile system
- Sea Wolf (missile)
- Barak 8
- VL-SRSAM
