= List of active Indian Navy ships in the Eastern Fleet =

== Submarines ==
Nuclear Ballistic missile submarine (SSBN) (2 in service)
Class	Image	Boat	No.	Disp. (t)	Comm.	Origin	Homeport	Note
Arihant class		INS Arihant	S2	6,000	2016	India	Visakhapatnam	First ever indigenously built class of nuclear ballistic missile submarines.
Arihant class		INS Arighaat	S3	6,000	2024	India	Visakhapatnam	First ever indigenously built class of nuclear ballistic missile submarines.
Attack submarine (SSK) (4 in service)
Class	Image	Boat	No.	Disp. (t)	Comm.	Origin	Homeport	Note
Sindhughosh class		INS Sindhurashtra	S65	3,800	2000		Visakhapatnam	Indian Specific variant of the Kilo-class submarine
Sindhughosh class		INS Sindhukirti	S61	3,800	1997		Visakhapatnam	Indian Specific variant of the Kilo-class submarine
Sindhughosh class		INS Sindhuvijay	S62	3,800	1998		Visakhapatnam	Indian Specific variant of the Kilo-class submarine
Sindhughosh class		INS Sindhukesari	S60	3,800	1998		Visakhapatnam	Indian Specific variant of the Kilo-class submarine

== Surface ships ==
=== Aircraft carriers ===
Aircraft carrier (1 in service)
Class	Image	Boat	No.	Disp. (t)	Comm.	Origin	Homeport	Note
Vikrant class		INS Vikrant	R11	45,000	2022	India	Visakhapatnam(Planned)	First indigenously built aircraft carrier.

=== Amphibious ships ===
Landing platform dock (1 in service)
Class	Image	Boat	No.	Disp. (t)	Comm.	Origin	Homeport	Note
Austin class		INS Jalashwa	L41	16,590	2007	United States	Visakhapatnam	Ex-USS Trenton; refurbished and sold to India in 2007.
Landing ship tank (4 in service)
Class	Image	Boat	No.	Disp. (t)	Comm.	Origin	Homeport	Note
Magar class		INS Gharial	L23	5,665	1997	India	Visakhapatnam	Indian derivative of the Round Table-class Landing Ship Tanks.
Shardul class		INS Kesari	L15	5,650	2008	India	Sri Vijaya Puram	Follow on the Magar-class amphibious warfare vessel.
Shardul class		INS Airavat	L24	5,650	2009	India	Sri Vijaya Puram	Follow on the Magar-class amphibious warfare vessel.
Landing craft utility (8 in service)
Class	Image	Boat	No.	Disp. (t)	Comm.	Origin	Homeport	Note
Mk. IV LCU		INS LCU 51	L51	830	2017	India	Sri Vijaya Puram	Follow-on of the Mk. III LCU class.
Mk. IV LCU		INS LCU 52	L52	830	2017	India	Sri Vijaya Puram	Follow-on of the Mk. III LCU class.
Mk. IV LCU		INS LCU 53	L53	830	2018	India	Sri Vijaya Puram	Follow-on of the Mk. III LCU class.
Mk. IV LCU		INS LCU 54	L54	830	2018	India	Sri Vijaya Puram	Follow-on of the Mk. III LCU class.
Mk. IV LCU		INS LCU 55	L55	830	2018	India	Sri Vijaya Puram	Follow-on of the Mk. III LCU class.
Mk. IV LCU		INS LCU 56	L56	830	2019	India	Sri Vijaya Puram	Follow-on of the Mk. III LCU class.
Mk. IV LCU		INS LCU 57	L57	830	2020	India	Sri Vijaya Puram	Follow-on of the Mk. III LCU class.
Mk. IV LCU		INS LCU 58	L58	830	2021	India	Sri Vijaya Puram	Follow-on of the Mk. III LCU class.

=== Destroyers ===
Destroyers (6 in service)
Class	Image	Boat	No.	Disp. (t)	Comm.	Origin	Homeport	Note
Delhi class		INS Delhi	D61	6,200	1997	India	Visakhapatnam	First class of indigenously built destroyers.
Delhi class		INS Mysore	D60	6,200	1999	India	Visakhapatnam	First class of indigenously built destroyers.
Delhi class		INS Mumbai	D62	6,200	2001	India	Visakhapatnam	First class of indigenously built destroyers.
Rajput class		INS Rana	D52	4,974	1982	Soviet Union	Visakhapatnam	Indian-derivative of the Kashin class destroyers.
Rajput class		INS Ranvir	D54	4,974	1986	Soviet Union	Visakhapatnam	Indian-derivative of the Kashin class destroyers.
Rajput class		INS Ranvijay	D55	4,974	1987	Soviet Union	Visakhapatnam	Indian-derivative of the Kashin class destroyers.

=== Frigates ===
Frigates (7 in service)
Class	Image	Boat	No.	Disp. (t)	Comm.	Origin	Homeport	Note
Nilgiri class		INS Nilgiri	F33	6,700	2025	India	Visakhapatnam	Upgraded derivative of Shivalik class frigates.
Nilgiri class		INS Udaygiri	F35	6,700	2025	India	Visakhapatnam	Upgraded derivative of Shivalik class frigates.
Nilgiri class		INS Himgiri	F34	6,700	2025	India	Visakhapatnam	Upgraded derivative of Shivalik class frigates.
Nilgiri class		INS Taragiri	F41	6,700	2026	India	Visakhapatnam	Upgraded derivative of Shivalik class frigates.
Nilgiri class		INS Dunagiri	F36	6,700	2026	India	Delivered	Upgraded derivative of Shivalik class frigates.
Shivalik class		INS Shivalik	F47	6,200	2010	India	Visakhapatnam	Indigenously built frigates with low observability.
Shivalik class		INS Satpura	F48	6,200	2011	India	Visakhapatnam	Indigenously built frigates with low observability.
Shivalik class		INS Sahyadri	F49	6,200	2012	India	Visakhapatnam	Indigenously built frigates with low observability.

=== Corvettes ===
Corvettes (11 in service)								
Class	Image	Boat	No.	Disp. (t)	Comm.	Origin	Homeport	Note
Arnala class		INS Arnala	P68	900-1,500	2025	India	Visakhapatnam	Dedicated ASW fleet envisaged to replace the former Abhay-class corvette.
Arnala class		INS Androth	P69	900-1,500	2025	India	Visakhapatnam	Dedicated ASW fleet envisaged to replace the former Abhay-class corvette.
Kamorta class		INS Kamorta	P28	3,300	2014	India	Visakhapatnam	Dedicated anti-submarine warfare vessels.
Kamorta class		INS Kadmatt	P29	3,300	2016	India	Visakhapatnam	Dedicated anti-submarine warfare vessels.
Kamorta class		INS Kiltan	P30	3,300	2017	India	Visakhapatnam	Dedicated anti-submarine warfare vessels.
Kamorta class		INS Kavaratti	P31	3,300	2020	India	Visakhapatnam	Dedicated anti-submarine warfare vessels.
Kora class		INS Kora	P61	1,400	1998	India	Visakhapatnam	Dedicated anti-surface warfare vessels.
Kora class		INS Kirch	P62	1,400	2001	India	Visakhapatnam	Dedicated anti-surface warfare vessels.
Kora class		INS Kulish	P63	1,400	2001	India	Sri Vijaya Puram	Dedicated anti-surface warfare vessels.
Kora class		INS Karmuk	P64	1,400	2004	India	Sri Vijaya Puram	Dedicated anti-surface warfare vessels.
Khukri class		INS Kuthar	P46	1,350	1990	India	Visakhapatnam	Successor to the IN's Petya II corvettes.
Khukri class		INS Khanjar	P47	1,350	1991	India	Visakhapatnam	Successor to the IN's Petya II corvettes.

=== Patrol vessels ===
Offshore patrol vessels (5 in service)
Class	Image	Boat	No.	Disp. (t)	Comm.	Origin	Homeport	Note
Saryu class		INS Saryu	P54	2,300	2013	India	Sri Vijaya Puram	Used for maritime patrol operations.
Saryu class		INS Sunayna	P57	2,300	2013	India	Kochi	Used for maritime patrol operations.
Saryu class		INS Sumedha	P58	2,300	2014	India	Sri Vijaya Puram	Used for maritime patrol operations.
Saryu class		INS Sumitra	P59	2,300	2014	India	Chennai	Used for maritime patrol operations.
Sukanya class		INS Savitri	P53	1,900	1990	India	Visakhapatnam	Doubled as light frigates; served additional role as missile test platforms..
Patrol vessels (19 in service)
Class	Image	Boat	No.	Disp. (t)	Comm.	Origin	Homeport	Note
Car Nicobar class	Fleet 1 - 10 in service							
Car Nicobar class		INS Car Nicobar	T69	293	2009	India	Chennai	Follow on of the Bangaram class vessels.
Car Nicobar class		INS Chetlat	T70	293	2009	India	Chennai	Follow on of the Bangaram class vessels.
Car Nicobar class		INS Cora Divh	T71	293	2009	India	Sri Vijaya Puram	Follow on of the Bangaram class vessels.
Car Nicobar class		INS Cheriyam	T72	293	2009	India	Sri Vijaya Puram	Follow on of the Bangaram class vessels.
