= INS Taragiri =

The following ships of the Indian Navy have been named INS Taragiri:

- INS Taragiri (F41) was a Nilgiri-class frigate launched in 1980
- INS Taragiri (2022) is a Nilgiri-class frigate launched in 2022
