= INS Vindhyagiri =

The following ships of the Indian Navy have been named INS Vindhyagiri:

- INS Vindhyagiri (F42) was a Nilgiri-class frigate launched in 1977
- INS Vindhyagiri (2023) is a Nilgiri-class frigate launched in 2023
