= INS Mahendragiri =

Indian Navy frigate

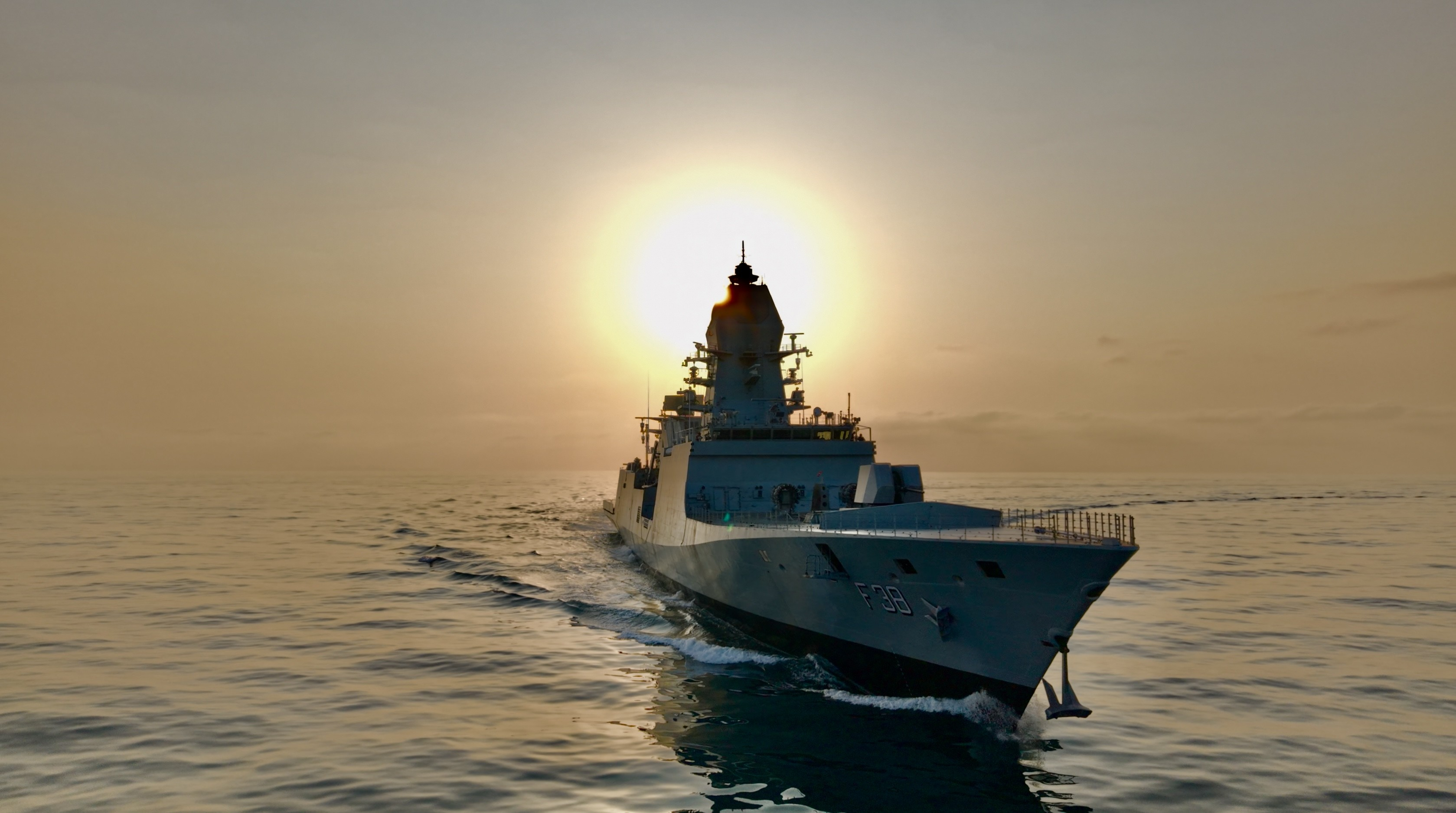
- Mahendragiri prior to commissioning

History

India
- Name: INS Mahendragiri
- Owner: Indian Navy
- Builder: Mazagon Dock Shipbuilders
- Laid down: 28 June 2022
- Launched: 1 September 2023
- Acquired: 30 April 2026
- Commissioned: 11 July 2026
- Identification: Pennant number: F38
- Status: Active

General characteristics
- Class & type: Nilgiri-class guided-missile frigate
- Displacement: 6,670 tonnes (6,560 long tons; 7,350 short tons)
- Length: 149 m (488 ft 10 in)
- Beam: 17.8 m (58 ft 5 in)
- Draft: 5.22 m (17 ft 2 in)
- Depth: 9.9 m (32 ft 6 in)
- Installed power: 2 x MAN Diesel 12V28/33D STC (6000 kW each); 2 x General Electric LM2500
- Propulsion: CODAG
- Speed: 28 kn (52 km/h)
- Range: 1,000 nmi (1,900 km) at 28 kn (52 km/h); 5,500 nmi (10,200 km) at 16–18 kn (30–33 km/h)
- Complement: 226
- Sensors & processing systems: Radar :-; IAI EL/M-2248 MF-STAR S band AESA radar; Indra LTR-25 'Lanza' L-Band surface-search radar; Sonar :-; BEL HUMSA-NG bow sonar; Combat Suite :-; "Combat Management System" (CMS-17A)
- Electronic warfare & decoys: BEL Ajanta EW suite; 4 x Kavach Decoy launchers
- Armament: Anti-air missiles: 4 × 8-cell VLS, for a total of 32; Barak 8 missiles (Range: 0.5 km (0.31 mi) to 100 km (62 mi)); Anti-ship/Land-attack missiles: 2 x 4-cells VLS, for 8 BrahMos anti-ship and land-attack cruise missiles; Guns: 1 × 76 mm/62 BHEL Super Rapid Gun Mount naval gun (upgraded); 2 × AK-630 CIWS; Anti-submarine warfare: 2 × Triple torpedo tubes Varunastra; 2 × RBU-6000 anti-submarine rocket launchers (72 rockets)
- Aircraft carried: 2 × HAL Dhruv or Sea King Mk. 42B helicopters

INS Mahendragiri is a Nilgiri-class stealth guided missile frigates of the Indian Navy. It was built at Mazagon Dock Shipbuilders (MDL) in Mumbai.

== Namesake ==
The ship has been named after the Mahendragiri mountain peak in the Eastern Ghats in Odisha.

== Construction ==
Mahendragiri is the seventh and final ship of the P-17A frigates, which are the advanced version of Shivalik-class frigates with enhanced stealth features, upgraded weapons and sensors and improved platform management systems on-board.

The construction of Mahendragiri commenced on 22 January 2020; with the project being inaugurated by Vice Admiral S. R. Sarma, the Controller of Warship Production and Acquisition (CWP&A). The hull was assigned the Yard Number 12654. The warship was formally launched by Sudesh Dhankhar, wife of Vice-President of India Jagdeep Dhankhar, on 1 September 2023. Mahendragiri was then arked at the Wet Basins of the MDL following the launch for remaining outfitting and trials along with the three ships of her class.

Mahendragiri is internally designed by Indian Navy’s Warship Design Bureau and the indigenously designed ship has state of the art weapons, enhanced stealth features, sensors, and platform management systems. She is the 100th ship to be designed and delivered by the Warship Design Bureau. She was finally delivered to the Navy on 30 April 2026. Mahendragiri was commissioned at Visakhapatnam on 11 July 2026. In July, Rolls-Royce announced that INS Dunagiri and INS Mahendragiri are equipped with four MTU 12V 396 TE54 generator sets.

== See also ==
- List of frigates of India
