= INS Himgiri (2020) =

Indian stealth guided-missile frigate

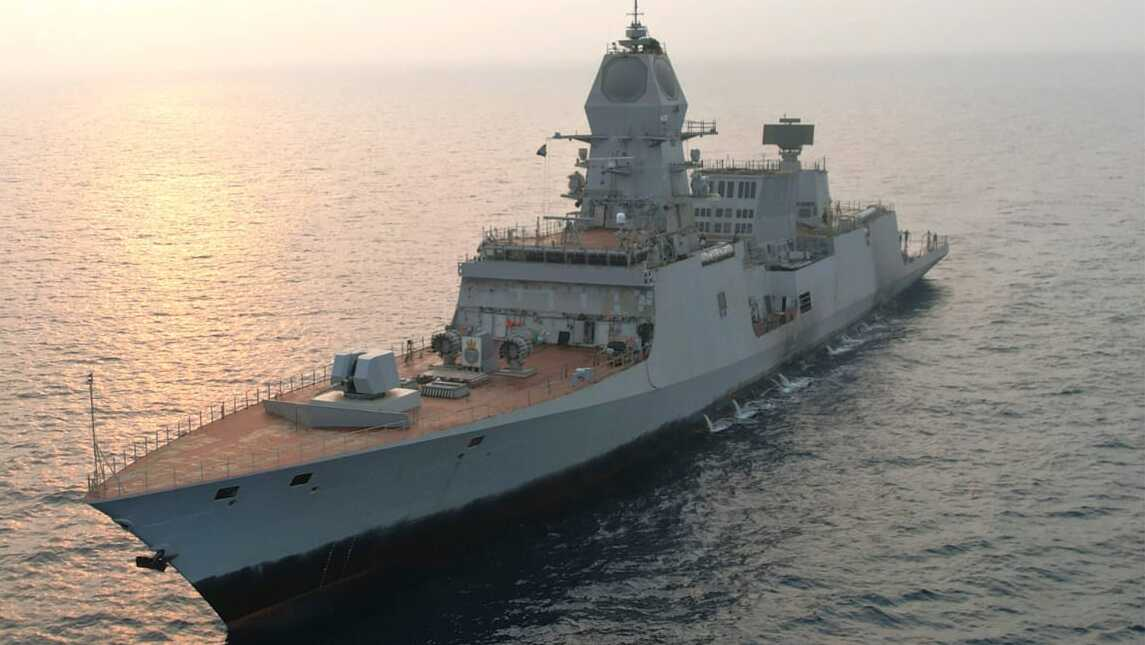
- Himgiri before commissioning

History

India
- Name: Himgiri
- Operator: Indian Navy
- Builder: Garden Reach Shipbuilders and Engineers
- Laid down: 10 November 2018
- Launched: 14 December 2020
- Acquired: 31 July 2025
- Commissioned: 26 August 2025
- Identification: Pennant number: F34
- Status: Active

General characteristics
- Class & type: Nilgiri-class guided-missile frigate
- Displacement: 6,670 tonnes (6,560 long tons; 7,350 short tons)
- Length: 149 m (488 ft 10 in)
- Beam: 17.8 m (58 ft 5 in)
- Draft: 5.22 m (17 ft 2 in)
- Depth: 9.9 m (32 ft 6 in)
- Installed power: 2 x MAN Diesel 12V28/33D STC (6000 kW each); 2 x General Electric LM2500
- Speed: 28 kn (52 km/h)
- Range: 1,000 nmi (1,900 km) at 28 kn (52 km/h); 5,500 nmi (10,200 km) at 16–18 kn (30–33 km/h)
- Complement: 226
- Sensors & processing systems: BEL HUMSA-NG bow sonar; IAI EL/M-2248 MF-STAR S band AESA radar; Indra - TASL Lanza-N L-band air surveillance radar
- Electronic warfare & decoys: BEL Ajanta EW suite; 4 x Kavach Decoy launchers; 2 × NSTL Maareech torpedo-countermeasure systems
- Armament: Anti-air missiles: 4 × 8-cell VLS, for a total of 32; Barak 8 missiles (Range: 0.5 km (0.31 mi) to 100 km (62 mi)); Anti-ship/Land-attack missiles: 2 x 4-cells VLS, for 8 BrahMos anti-ship and land-attack cruise missiles; Guns: 1 × OTO Melara 76 mm Strales naval gun (manufactured by BHEL); 2 × AK-630 CIWS; Anti-submarine warfare: 2 × Triple torpedo tubes; 2 × RBU-6000 anti-submarine rocket launchers
- Aircraft carried: 2 × HAL Dhruv or Sea King Mk. 42B helicopters

INS Himgiri is the second ship of the Nilgiri-class stealth guided missile frigates being built by Garden Reach Shipbuilders and Engineers for the Indian Navy.

== Namesake ==
The ship is considered as the reincarnation of the former Leander-class frigate, INS Himgiri with the same pennant number. The former ship was in service between 1974 and 2005.

== Construction and career ==
The ship was laid down on 10 November 2018 and it was launched on 14 December 2020. The ship was scheduled to be delivered by mid 2025 and commissioned in the same year.

On 3 March 2025, GRSE completed the Contractor Sea Trials (CST) of INS Himgiri was completed by GRSE along with INS Androth. As per a press release, "CST is considered the final stage of construction, when a vessel's seaworthiness is tested".

The ship was delivered to the Navy on 31 July 2025. This is the first ship of the Nilgiri-class from GRSE to be delivered.

The ship was commissioned, along with Udaygiri, on 26 August at Naval Base, Visakhapatnam. This marked the maiden instance when two major surface ships from two different shipyards was commissioned simultaneously.

On 26 November 2025, the ship along with INS Ranvir, INS Satpura and Udaygiri visited the Port of Chennai as part of the year's Navy Day Celebrations. The visit saw the participation of over 930 students, 375 NCC cadets as well as 364 officer cadets from Officers Training Academy, Chennai.

INS Himgiri participated at the International Fleet Review 2026 held at Visakapatanam.

== Gallery ==
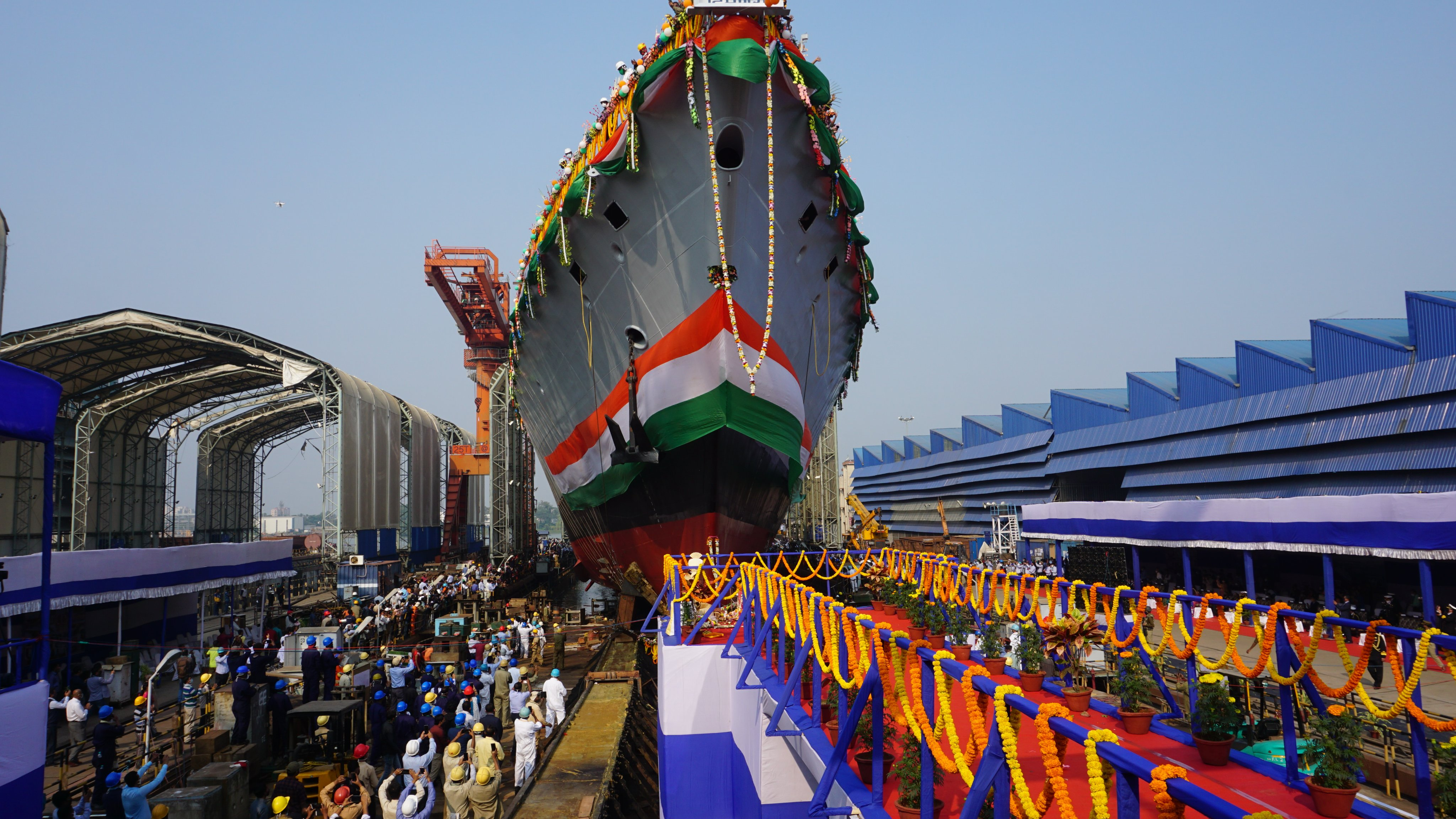
Himgiri during her launching ceremony

== See also ==
- Future of the Indian Navy
- List of active Indian Navy ships
