= INS Udaygiri (2022) =

Indian Navy frigate

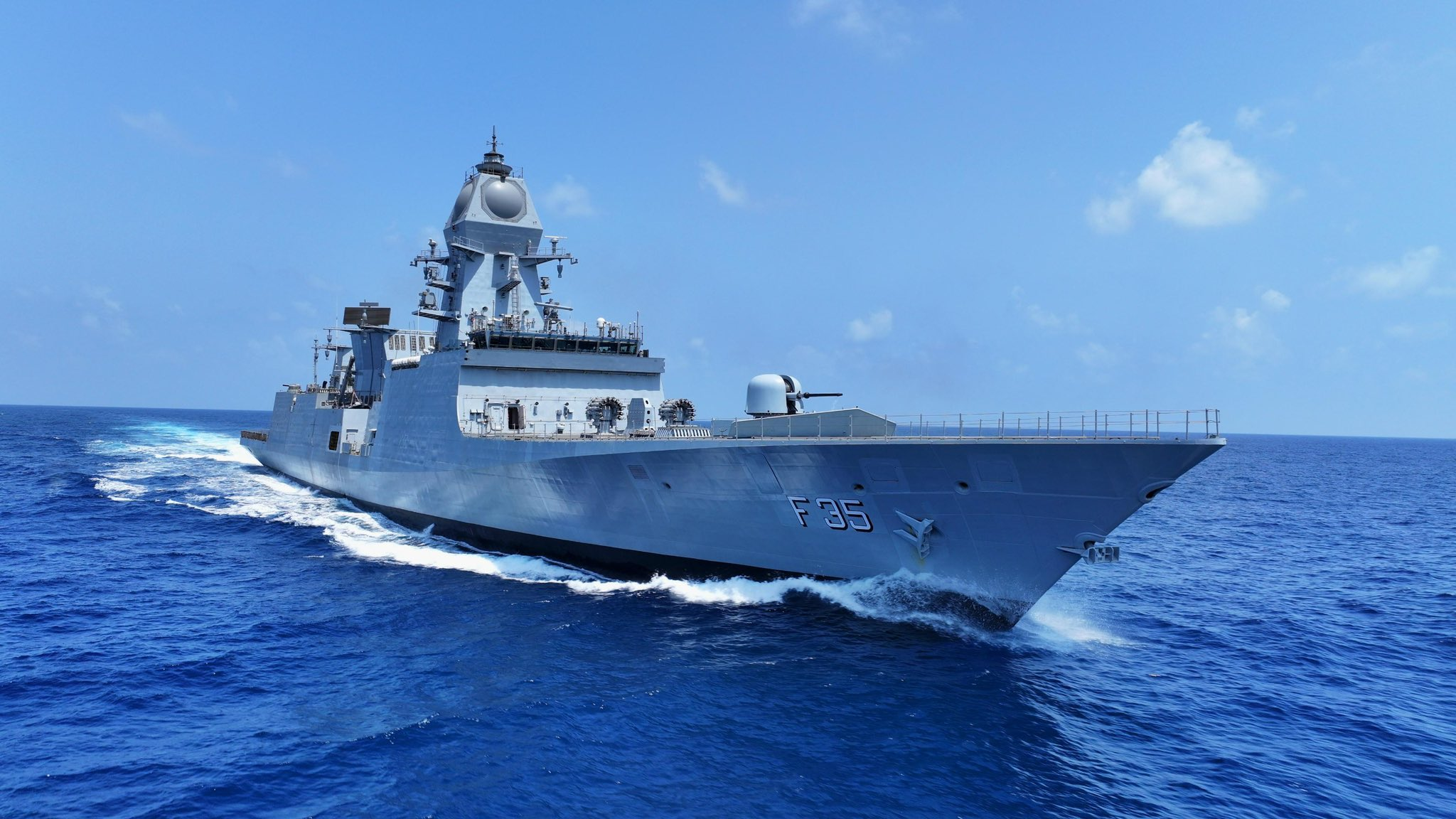
- Udaygiri at sea

History

India
- Name: Udaygiri
- Operator: Indian Navy
- Builder: Mazagon Dock Shipbuilders
- Yard number: 12652
- Laid down: 7 May 2019
- Launched: 17 May 2022
- Acquired: 1 July 2025
- Commissioned: 26 August 2025
- Identification: Pennant number: F35
- Status: Active

General characteristics
- Class & type: Nilgiri-class guided-missile frigate
- Displacement: 6,670 tonnes (6,560 long tons; 7,350 short tons)
- Length: 149 m (488 ft 10 in)
- Beam: 17.8 m (58 ft 5 in)
- Draft: 5.22 m (17 ft 2 in)
- Depth: 9.9 m (32 ft 6 in)
- Installed power: 2 x MAN Diesel 12V28/33D STC (6000 kW each); 2 x General Electric LM2500
- Speed: 28 kn (52 km/h)
- Range: 1,000 nmi (1,900 km) at 28 kn (52 km/h); 5,500 nmi (10,200 km) at 16–18 kn (30–33 km/h)
- Complement: 226
- Sensors & processing systems: BEL HUMSA-NG bow sonar; IAI EL/M-2248 MF-STAR S band AESA radar
- Electronic warfare & decoys: BEL Ajanta EW suite; 4 x Kavach Decoy launchers
- Armament: Anti-air missiles: 6 × 8-cell VLS, for a total of 48; Barak 8 missiles (Range: 0.5 km (0.31 mi) to 100 km (62 mi)); Anti-ship/Land-attack missiles: 2 x 4-cells VLS, for 8 BrahMos anti-ship and land-attack cruise missiles; Guns: 1 × 76 mm/62 BHEL Super Rapid Gun Mount naval gun (upgraded); 2 × AK-630 CIWS; Anti-submarine warfare: 2 × Triple torpedo tubes; 2 × RBU-6000 anti-submarine rocket launchers
- Aircraft carried: 2 × HAL Dhruv or Sea King Mk. 42B helicopters

INS Udaygiri is the Indian Navy's third ship of the Nilgiri-class stealth-guided missile frigates. Udaygiri is the 100th warship designed in India by the Warship Design Beureau.

== Namesake ==
The ship's name is inspired by the Udaygiri mountain range in the Indian state of Andhra Pradesh. Further, this is the second ship of the Indian Navy to be named after the mountain range, the first being a Leander-class frigate, INS Udaygiri with the same pennant number. The former ship was in service between 1976 and 2007.

== Construction and career ==
This ship is part of the Project-17 Alpha frigates (P-17A), a class of guided-missile frigates currently being constructed for the Navy by Mazagon Dock Shipbuilders (MDL) and Garden Reach Shipbuilders & Engineers (GRSE).

The ship was laid down on 7 May 2019 and was launched on 17 May 2022. The ship was delivered to the Indian Navy on 1 July 2025. This was within a record time of 37 months.

The ship was commissioned, along with Himgiri, on 26 August at Naval Base, Visakhapatnam. This marked the maiden instance when two major surface ships from two different shipyards was commissioned simultaneously.

On 26 November 2025, the ship along with INS Ranvir, INS Satpura and Himgiri visited the Port of Chennai as part of the year's Navy Week Celebrations. The visit saw the participation of over 930 students, 375 NCC cadets as well as 364 officer cadets from Officers Training Academy, Chennai.

The ship, commanded by Captain Vikas Sood, later joined INS Vikrant at the Port of Colombo, Sri Lanka to participate in the International Fleet Review 2025 (IFR), held as part of the 75th anniversary of the Sri Lanka Navy. This also marked the maiden foreign port visit for both of the ships. The IFR is scheduled between 27 and 29 November.

As part of Operation Sagar Bandhu which was undertaken to provide disaster relief to the island nation after being hit by Cyclone Ditwah, both of the ship supplied the first tranche of relief materials. Sri Lankan defence officials had formally requested INS Vikrant for use for the rescue and relief operations that are underway. The ships delivered 9.5 tonnes of relief materials.

INS Udaygiri participated at the International Fleet Review 2026 held at Visakapatanam.

In June 2026, a flotilla from the Eastern Fleet was operationally deployed to the South East Asia region. The flotilla is being commanded by the Flag Officer Commanding Eastern Fleet (FOCEF), Rear Admiral Alok Ananda, and consists of Udaygiri and INS Kavaratti (P31). They reached at Nha Rong Port, Ho Chi Minh City, Vietnam, on 22 June. The crew of the ships conducted professional interactions with the personnel of the Vietnam People's Navy. The ships departed Vietnam on 24 June. Later, INS Shakti (A57) joined the flotilla. The three ships conducted a port call at the Sattahip Naval Base, Thailand from 27 to 29 June. The flotilla conducted their third port call at the Changi Naval Base, Singapore from 1 July.

== Gallery ==
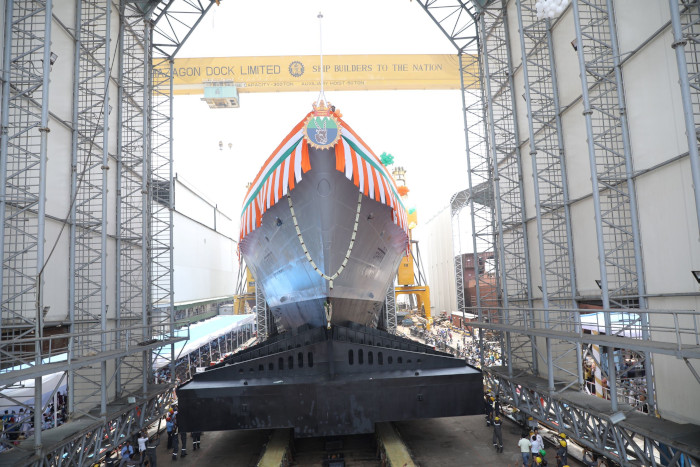
Udaygiri being launched

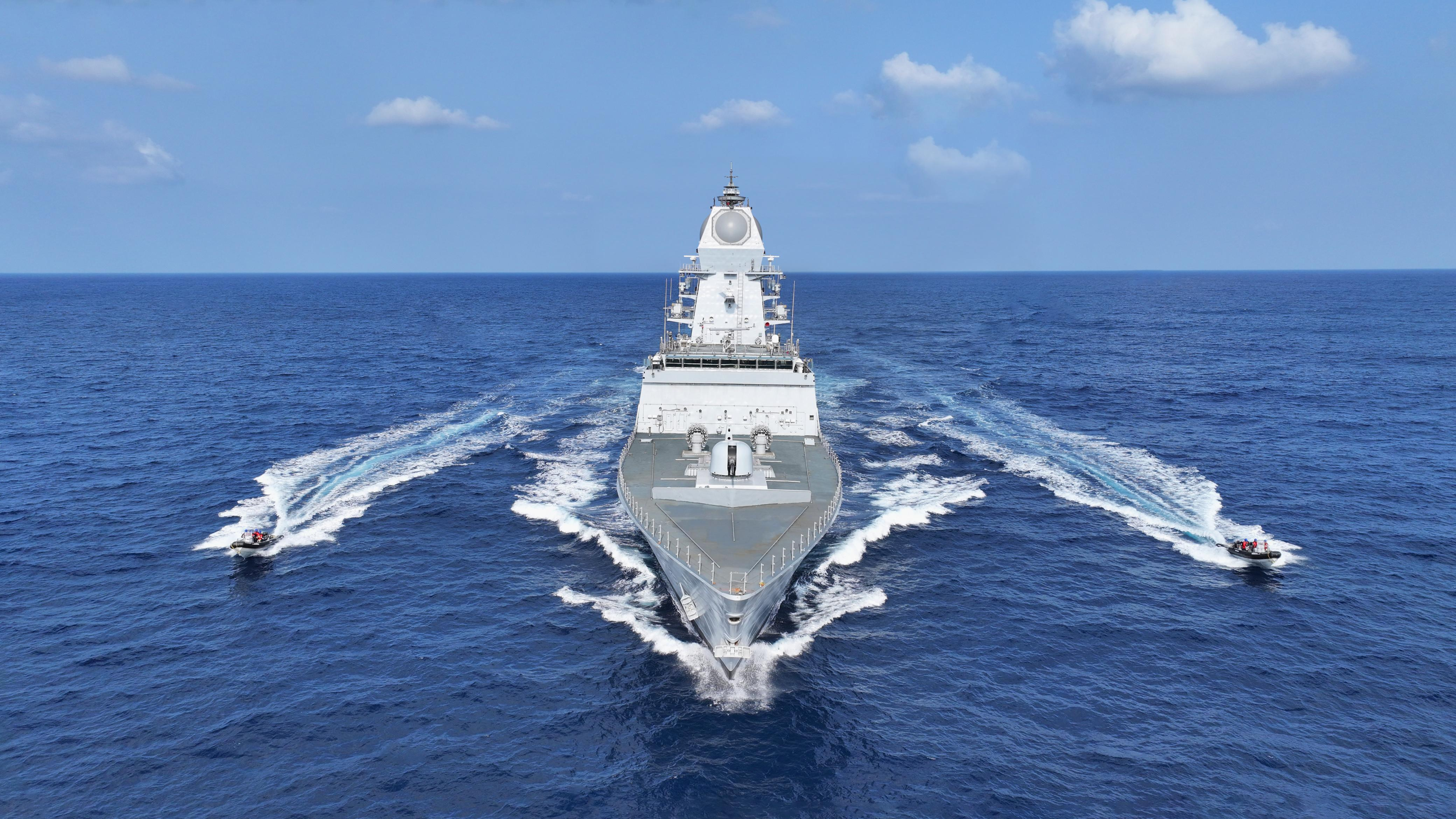
Udaygiri during sea trials

== See also ==
- Future of the Indian Navy
