= INS Taragiri (2022) =

Indian Navy vessel

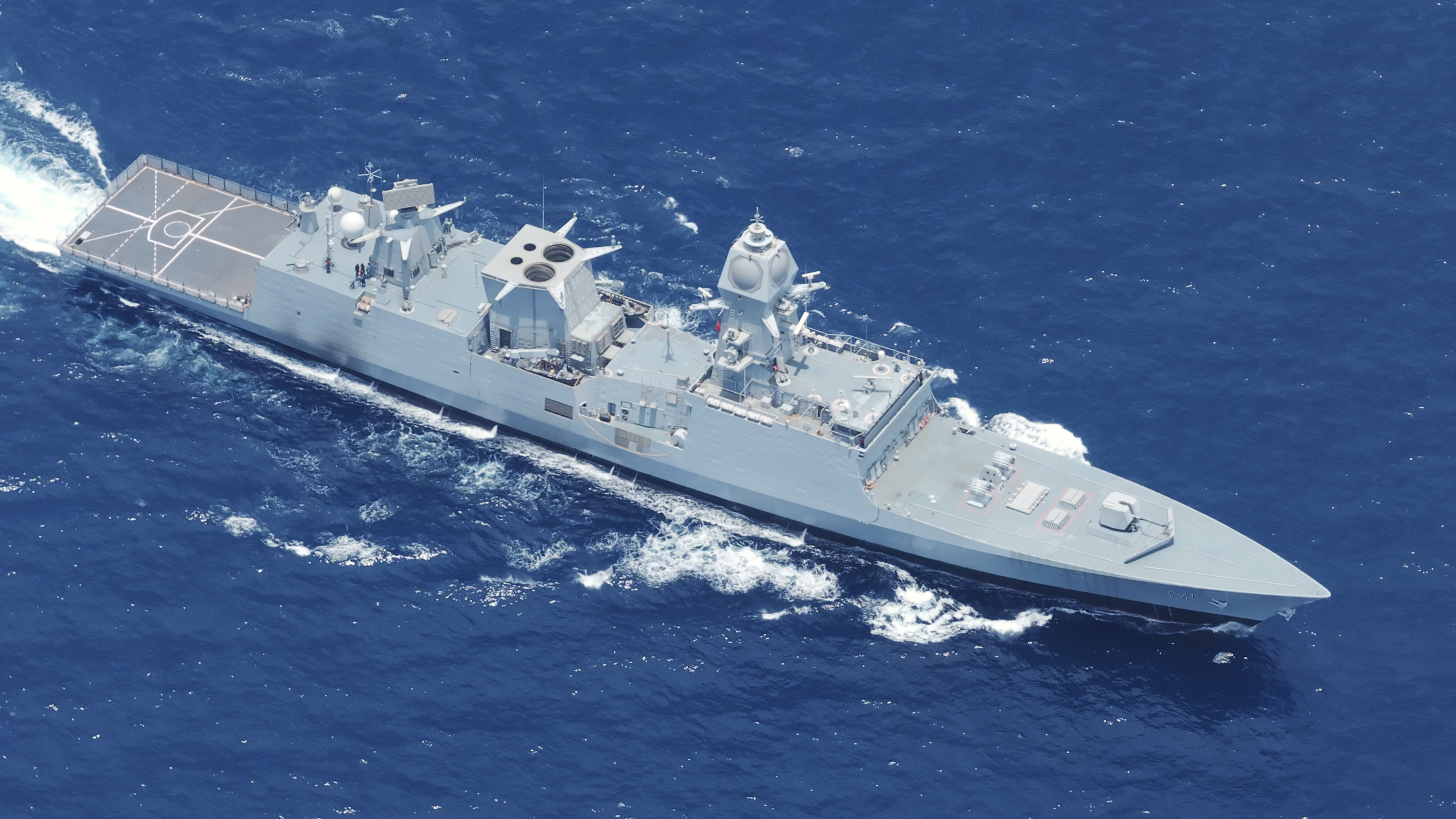
- Taragiri prior to commissioning.

History

India
- Name: Taragiri
- Operator: Indian Navy
- Builder: Mazagon Dock Shipbuilders
- Laid down: 10 September 2020
- Launched: 11 September 2022
- Acquired: 28 November 2025
- Commissioned: 3 April 2026
- Identification: Pennant number: F41
- Status: Active

General characteristics
- Class & type: Nilgiri-class guided-missile frigate
- Displacement: 6,670 tonnes (6,560 long tons; 7,350 short tons)
- Length: 149 m (488 ft 10 in)
- Beam: 17.8 m (58 ft 5 in)
- Draft: 5.22 m (17 ft 2 in)
- Depth: 9.9 m (32 ft 6 in)
- Installed power: 2 x MAN Diesel 12V28/33D STC (6000 kW each); 2 x General Electric LM2500
- Propulsion: CODAG
- Speed: 28 kn (52 km/h)
- Range: 1,000 nmi (1,900 km) at 28 kn (52 km/h); 5,500 nmi (10,200 km) at 16–18 kn (30–33 km/h)
- Complement: 226
- Sensors & processing systems: Radar :-; IAI EL/M-2248 MF-STAR S band AESA radar; Indra LTR-25 'Lanza' L-Band surface-search radar; Sonar :-; BEL HUMSA-NG bow sonar; Combat Suite :-; "Combat Management System" (CMS-17A)
- Electronic warfare & decoys: BEL Ajanta EW suite; 4 x Kavach Decoy launchers
- Armament: Anti-air missiles: 4 × 8-cell VLS, for a total of 32; Barak 8 missiles (Range: 0.5 km (0.31 mi) to 100 km (62 mi)); Anti-ship/Land-attack missiles: 2 x 4-cells VLS, for 8 BrahMos anti-ship and land-attack cruise missiles; Guns: 1 × 76 mm/62 BHEL Super Rapid Gun Mount naval gun (upgraded); 2 × AK-630 CIWS; Anti-submarine warfare: 2 × Triple torpedo tubes Varunastra; 2 × RBU-6000 anti-submarine rocket launchers (72 rockets)
- Aircraft carried: 2 × HAL Dhruv or Sea King Mk. 42B helicopters

INS Taragiri is the Indian Navy's fourth ship of the Nilgiri-class stealth, guided-missile frigates, formally classified as the Project-17 Alpha Frigates (P-17A). It was built by Mazagon Dock Shipbuilders for the Indian Navy.

== Naming ==
Named after the Taragiri hill range in the Indian state of Uttarakhand, the ship has been named after the INS Taragiri, a Leander-class frigate which was in service with the Indian Navy between 1980 and 2013.

== Construction ==
The ship was laid down on 10 September 2020 and was launched on 11 September 2022. The ship was expected to be commissioned by the August 2025 but after some delay it has been finally commissioned in April 2026.

Taragiri, the third Project 17A-class ship built by Mazagon Dock, was delivered to the Indian Navy on 28 November 2025.

The ship was initially expected to be commissioned in February 2026 but was later scheduled to 3 April 2026.

== Service history ==
The ship was commissioned on 3 April 2026 by the Defence Minister, Rajnath Singh, at Naval Dockyard, Visakhapatnam. During commissioning, the senior officers of the ship included

- Captain Hemanth, the commanding officer,
- Commander Siddhartha Gupta, the executive officer and principal warfare officer of the ship
- Commander G Siva Venkatesh,the Engineer Officer and Ship Control Centre Coordinator
- Commander Akhilesh Sharma, the electrical officer, and
- Commander Abhishek Bali, the logistics officer.

== Gallery ==
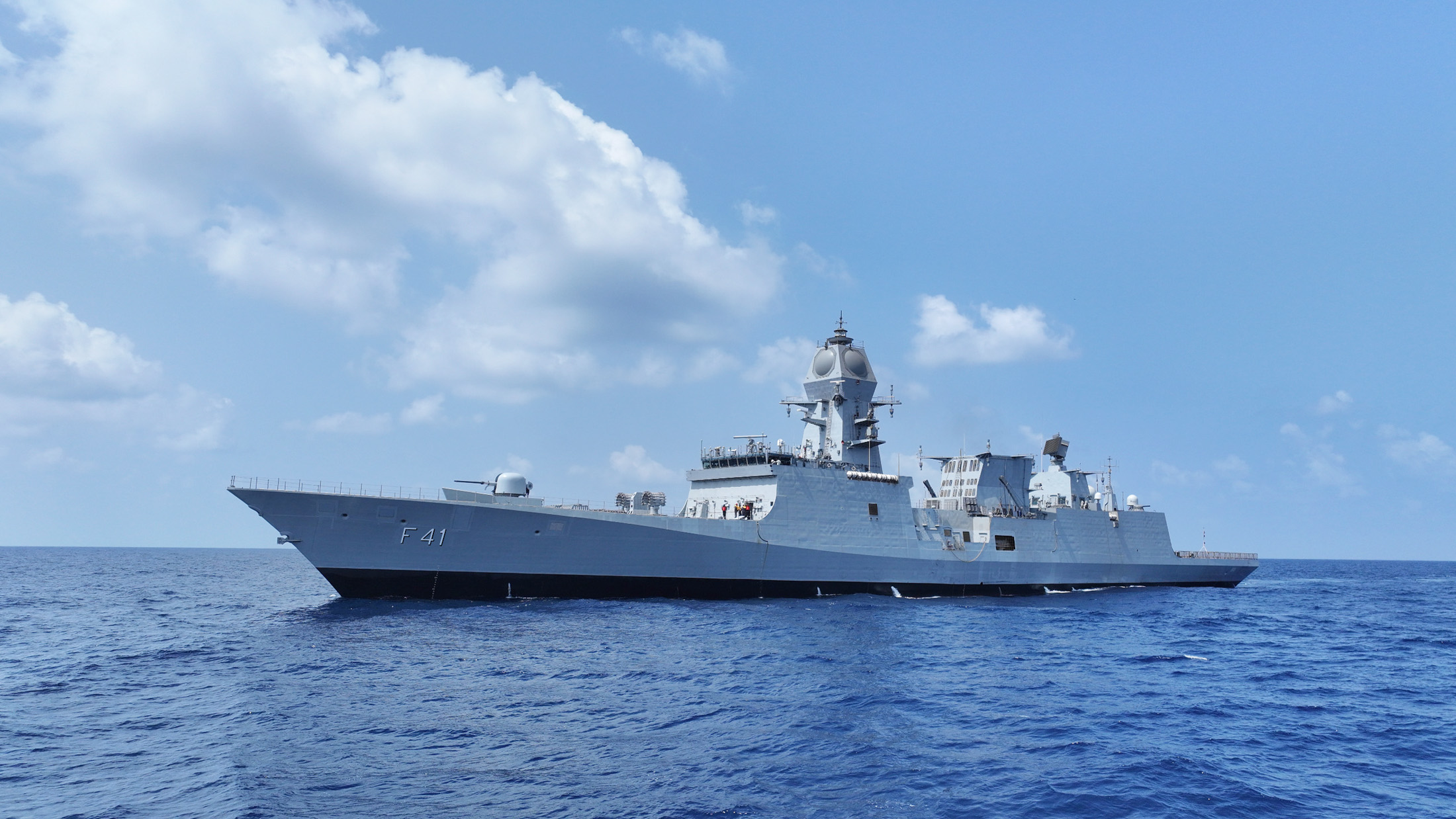

== See also ==
- Future of the Indian Navy
- List of active Indian Navy ships
