= INS Vindhyagiri (2023) =

India's indigenous advanced stealth frigate

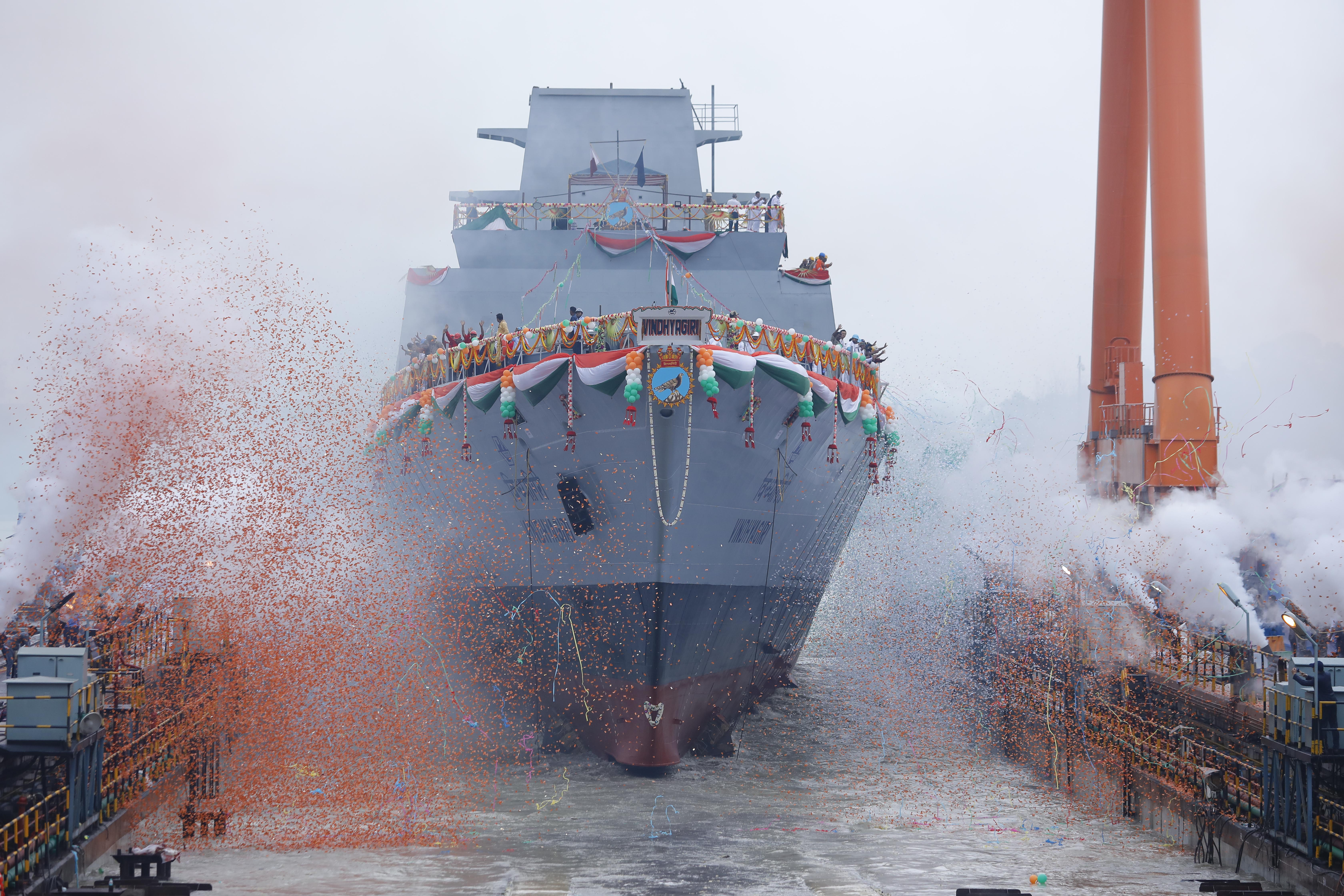
- INS Vindhyagiri at its launch

History

India
- Name: INS Vindhyagiri
- Namesake: Vindhyagiri Hill
- Owner: Indian Navy
- Builder: GRSE
- Yard number: 3024
- Laid down: 5 March 2021
- Launched: 17 August 2023
- Status: Launched

General characteristics
- Class & type: Nilgiri-class guided-missile frigate
- Displacement: 6,670 tonnes (6,560 long tons; 7,350 short tons)
- Length: 149 m (488 ft 10 in)
- Beam: 17.8 m (58 ft 5 in)
- Draft: 5.22 m (17 ft 2 in)
- Depth: 9.9 m (32 ft 6 in)
- Installed power: 2 x MAN Diesel 12V28/33D STC (6000 kW each); 2 x General Electric LM2500
- Propulsion: CODAG
- Speed: 28 kn (52 km/h)
- Range: 1,000 nmi (1,900 km) at 28 kn (52 km/h); 5,500 nmi (10,200 km) at 16–18 kn (30–33 km/h)
- Complement: 226
- Sensors & processing systems: Radar :-; IAI EL/M-2248 MF-STAR S band AESA radar; Indra LTR-25 'Lanza' L-Band surface-search radar; Sonar :-; BEL HUMSA-NG bow sonar; Combat Suite :-; "Combat Management System" (CMS-17A)
- Electronic warfare & decoys: BEL Ajanta EW suite; 4 x Kavach Decoy launchers
- Armament: Anti-air missiles: 4 × 8-cell VLS, for a total of 32; Barak 8 missiles (Range: 0.5 km (0.31 mi) to 100 km (62 mi)); Anti-ship/Land-attack missiles: 2 x 4-cells VLS, for 8 BrahMos anti-ship and land-attack cruise missiles; Guns: 1 × 76 mm/62 BHEL Super Rapid Gun Mount naval gun (upgraded); 2 × AK-630 CIWS; Anti-submarine warfare: 2 × Triple torpedo tubes Varunastra; 2 × RBU-6000 anti-submarine rocket launchers (72 rockets)
- Aircraft carried: 2 × HAL Dhruv or Sea King Mk. 42B helicopters

INS Vindhyagiri is a Nilgiri-class stealth guided missile frigates of the Indian Navy. It was built at Garden Reach Shipbuilders & Engineers (GRSE) in Kolkata.

== Namesake ==
The ship is named after the former Leander-class ASW frigate, INS Vindhyagiri (F42), that was in service with the Indian Navy between 1981–2012. The ship itslef derived its name from the hill in Karnataka.

== Construction and career ==
Vindhyagiri is the sixth ship of the P-17A frigates, which are the advanced version of Shivalik-class frigates with enhanced stealth features, upgraded weapons and sensors and improved platform management systems on-board. The keel was laid for the warhip on 5 March 2021. The warship was formally launched the President of India, Droupadi Murmu, on 17 August 2023.
