= INS Nilgiri (2019) =

Stealth guided missile frigate of the Indian Navy

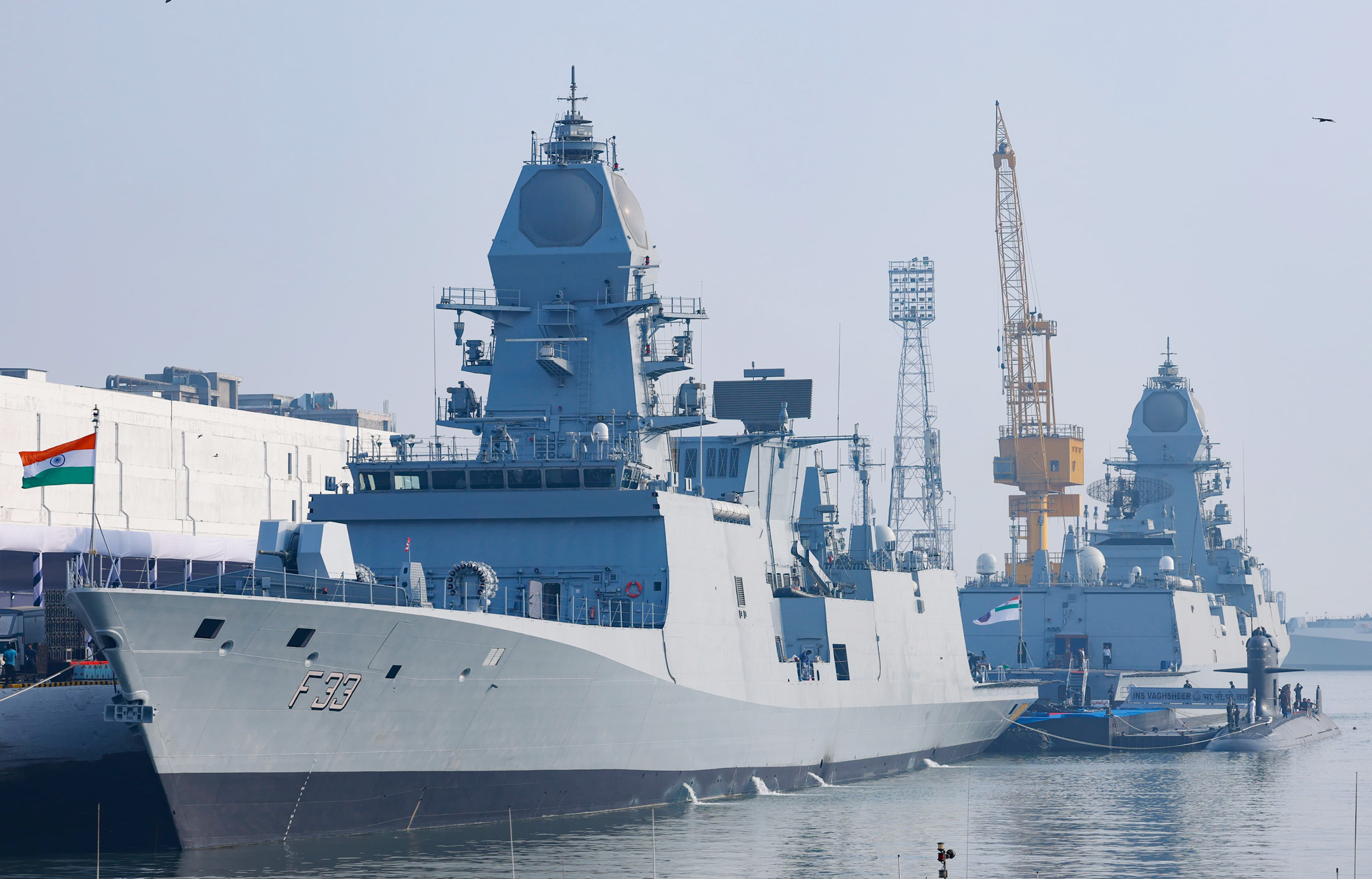
- INS Nilgiri

History

India
- Name: Nilgiri
- Builder: Mazagon Dock Limited
- Laid down: 28 December 2017
- Launched: 28 September 2019
- Acquired: 20 December 2024
- Commissioned: 15 January 2025
- Identification: Pennant number: F33
- Motto: अदृश्य बलम्, अजेय शौर्यम् (Sanskrit); "Invisible Strength, Invincible Courage" (translated)
- Status: In active service
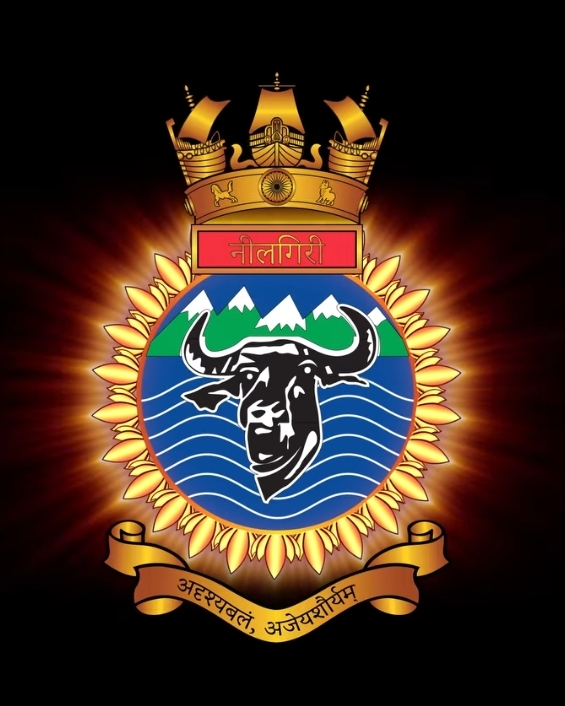
- Badge

General characteristics
- Type: Guided-missile frigate
- Displacement: 6,670 t (6,560 long tons)
- Length: 149 m (488 ft 10 in)
- Beam: 17.8 m (58 ft 5 in)
- Draft: 5.22 m (17 ft 2 in)
- Depth: 9.9 m (32 ft 6 in)
- Installed power: 2 × General Electric LM2500+ (30,200 kW each); 2 × MAN Diesel 12V28/33D STC (6,000 kW each)
- Propulsion: CODAG
- Speed: 32 kn (59 km/h)
- Range: 2,500 nmi (4,600 km) at 28 kn (52 km/h); 5,500 nmi (10,200 km) at 16–18 kn (30–33 km/h)
- Boats & landing craft carried: 2 × RHIB
- Complement: 226 (Including 35 officers)
- Sensors & processing systems: Radar :-; IAI EL/M-2248 MF-STAR S-Band AESA radar; Indra (TASL) Lanza-N L-band air surveillance radar; Sonar :-; BEL HUMSA-NG active/passive sonar; Combat Suite :-; "Combat Management System" (CMS-17A)
- Electronic warfare & decoys: DRDO "Shakti" EW suite (equipped with ESM/ECM and "Radar Finger Printing System" (RFPS)); Decoys :-; 4 × Kavach decoy launchers; 2 × NSTL Maareech torpedo-countermeasure systems
- Armament: Anti-air warfare :-; 4 × 8-cell VLS, for 32 Barak 8 surface-to-air missiles; Anti-surface warfare :-; 1 × 8-cell VLS, for 8 BrahMos anti-ship missiles; Anti-submarine warfare :-; 2 × triple-tube torpedo launchers for Varunastra; 2 × RBU-6000 anti-submarine rocket launchers (72 rockets); Guns :-; 1 × 76 mm/62 BHEL Super Rapid Gun Mount naval gun (upgraded); 2 × AK-630M CIWS
- Aircraft carried: 1 × HAL Dhruv (or) Sea King Mk. 42B helicopters
- Aviation facilities: Enclosed helicopter hangar capable of accommodating one multi-role helicopters.
- Notes: First major class of Indian-designed warships to be built using integrated modular construction.

INS Nilgiri is the lead ship of the Nilgiri-class stealth guided missile frigates being built by Mazagon Shipyard Dock Limited for the Indian Navy.

== Construction ==
The keel for Nilgiri was laid down on 28 December 2017 and the vessel was launched on 28 September 2019. The ship embarked for its maiden sea trials on 25 August 2024. The ship was delivered to the Indian Navy on 20 December 2024. The ship was initially scheduled to be commissioned in December 2024 but the timeline was later shifted.

The ship was commissioned on 15 January 2025 along with INS Surat and INS Vagsheer.

== Service history ==
The commissioning commanding officer of Nilgiri is Captain Nitin Kapoor. The ship reached her homeport Visakhapatnam under the Eastern Naval Command on 22 June 2025.

INS Nilgiri made its maiden port call at Chennai Harbour on 21 July 2025 before participating at the International Fleet Review 2026 in Visakhapatanam in February 2026. In March 2026, the ship participated in the Royal Australian Navy's multilateral naval exercise Kakadu 2026 during her deployment to the Western Pacific Ocean.

Nilgiri participated in the 33rd edition of SIMBEX, which was hosted by India from 21 to 26 October 2026. The harbour phase was held at Visakhapatnam until 23 October followed by the sea phase from 24 October in the Bay of Bengal. The exercise also included the participation of INS Kamorta from the Indian Navy and RSS Supreme from the Republic of Singapore Navy. The air assets deployed in the exercise included an SH-70B helicopter with Supreme along with P-8I Neptune, Do-228 MPA, Hawk 132 and MH-60R helicopters of the Indian Naval Air Arm.

== See also ==
- List of active Indian Navy ships
- Future of the Indian Navy
