= Nilgiri-class frigate (2019) =

Indian stealth guided-missile frigates

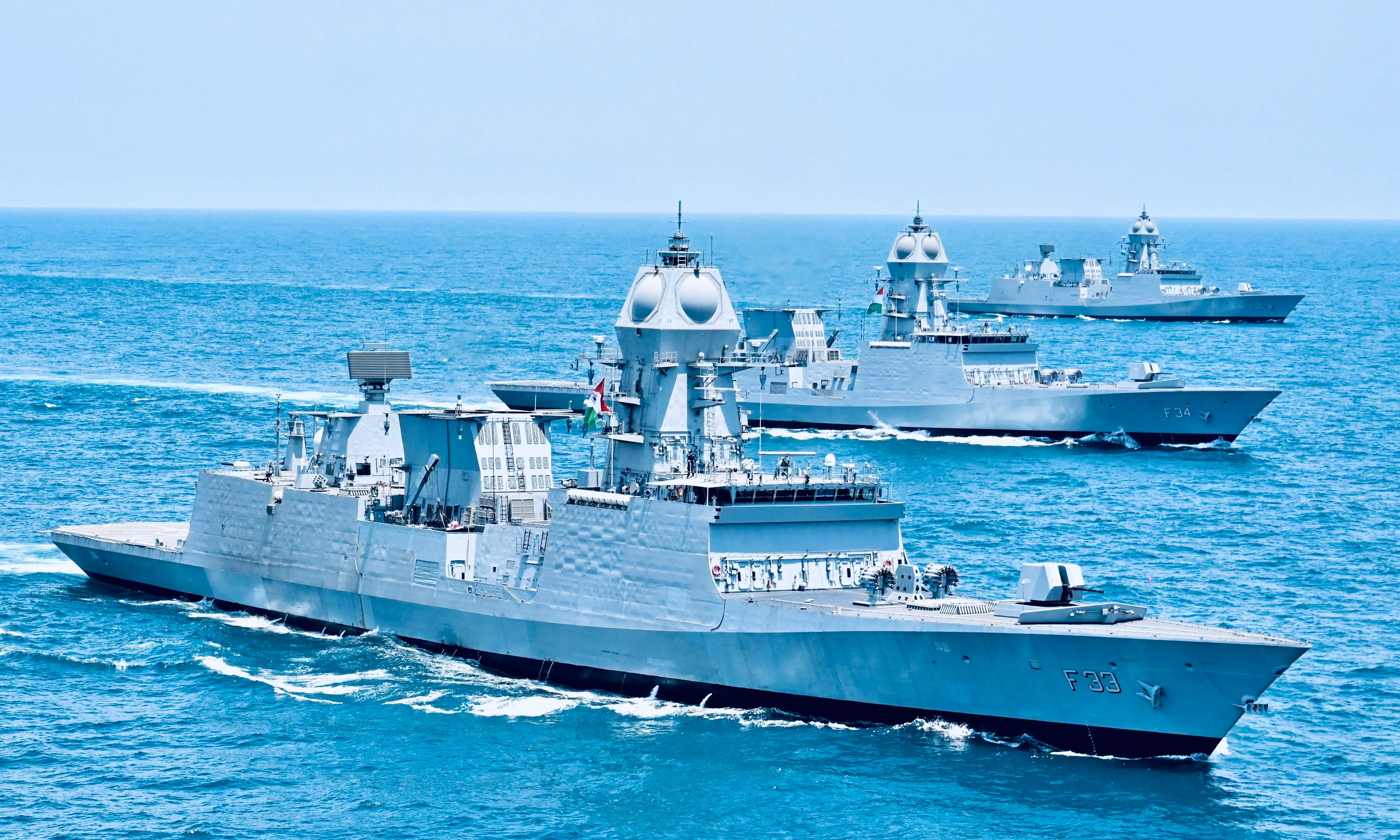
- INS Nilgiri (F33), Himgiri (F34) and Udaygiri (F35) sailing in formation

Class overview
- Name: Nilgiri class
- Builders: Garden Reach Shipbuilders & Engineers; Mazagon Dock Shipbuilders
- Operators: Indian Navy
- Preceded by: Shivalik class
- Succeeded by: Project 17B class
- Cost: ₹4,000 crore (equivalent to ₹51 billion or US$530 million in 2026) per frigate (Estimated); ₹45,000 crore (equivalent to ₹580 billion or US$6.0 billion in 2026) (Total deal)
- Built: 2017 – 2026
- In commission: 2025 – present
- Planned: 7
- Building: 1
- Completed: 6
- Active: 6

General characteristics
- Type: Guided-missile frigate
- Displacement: 6,670 t (6,560 long tons)
- Length: 149 m (488 ft 10 in)
- Beam: 17.8 m (58 ft 5 in)
- Draft: 5.22 m (17 ft 2 in)
- Depth: 9.9 m (32 ft 6 in)
- Installed power: 2 × HAL - General Electric LM2500+ (30,200 kW each); 2 × MAN Diesel 12V28/33D STC (6,000 kW each)
- Propulsion: CODOG
- Speed: 32 kn (59 km/h)
- Range: 2,500 nmi (4,600 km) at 28 kn (52 km/h); 5,500 nmi (10,200 km) at 16–18 kn (30–33 km/h)
- Boats & landing craft carried: 2 × RHIB
- Complement: 226 (35 officers + 191 sailors)
- Sensors & processing systems: Radar :-; IAI - BEL EL/M-2248 MF-STAR S-Band AESA radar; Indra - TASL Lanza-N L-band air surveillance radar; Sonar :-; BEL HUMSA-NG active/passive sonar; Combat Suite :-; "Combat Management System" (CMS-17A)
- Electronic warfare & decoys: DRDO "Shakti" EW suite (equipped with ESM/ECM and "Radar Finger Printing System" (RFPS)); Decoys :-; 4 × Kavach decoy launchers; 2 × NSTL Maareech torpedo-countermeasure systems
- Armament: Anti-air warfare :-; 4 × 8-cell VLS, for 32 Barak 8 surface-to-air missiles; Anti-surface warfare :-; 1 × 8-cell VLS, for 8 BrahMos anti-ship missiles; Anti-submarine warfare :-; 2 × triple-tube torpedo launchers for 324 mm Torpedo Advanced Light Shyena; 2 × RBU-6000 anti-submarine rocket launchers (72 rockets); Guns :-; 1 × 76 mm/62 BHEL Super Rapid Gun Mount naval gun (upgraded); 2 × AK-630M CIWS; Multiple OFT 12.7 mm M2 Stabilized Remote Controlled Gun
- Aircraft carried: 1 × HAL Dhruv (or) Sea King Mk. 42B helicopters
- Aviation facilities: Enclosed helicopter hangar capable of accommodating one multi-role helicopters.
- Notes: First major class of Indian-designed warships to be built using integrated modular construction.

The Nilgiri-class frigates, formally classified as the Project-17 Alpha frigates (P-17A), are a series of multi-mission stealth guided-missile frigates currently being built by Mazagon Dock Shipbuilders (MDL) and Garden Reach Shipbuilders & Engineers (GRSE) for the Indian Navy (IN).

Designed by the Warship Design Bureau, the class is intended to serve as a complement to the currently-serving Shivalik-class frigates (P-17) with improved design portfolios, such as low radar cross-section (RCS) and reduced infrared signature.

With a total of seven vessels, the construction of the frigates are currently divided between MDL and GRSE. As of 2024, all seven frigates have been launched and are intended to enter service with the IN between 2024 and 2027. The frigates will form a part of the Eastern Fleet as well as the future Carrier Battle Group (CBG) of INS Vikrant. Further, they can be independently deployed as a surface combatant or with a surface task force.

Upon entering service, the class is to be complemented by an additional series of seven or eight frigates, under the codename the Project-17B series.

== Design ==
=== Development ===
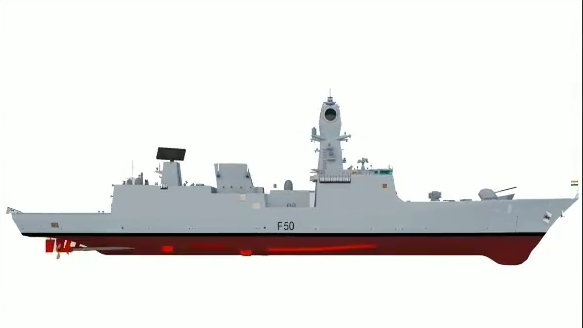
An animated depiction of the Nilgiri-class frigate, showing its starboard.

The frigates were designed by the Warship Design Bureau (formerly Directorate of Naval Design).

The class' design was finalised by the DND in 2013; it was later unveiled to the public in April 2018, when MDL displayed a scale model of the frigate at the DefExpo 2018 military exhibition, held at Chennai, India. The P17A ships are geo-symmetrically larger by 4.54 % vis-à-vis P17, or the Shivalik-class frigates, and also features 75% indigenous content.

On 5 September 2018, Mazagon Dock Shipbuilders (MDL) and Garden Reach Shipbuilders & Engineers (GRSE) awarded Bharat Electronics (BEL) with a ₹9,200 crore (equivalent to ₹130 billion or US$1.4 billion in 2026) contract to supply seven Barak 8 LR-SAM air defence systems for Nilgiri-class frigates. In October 2018, Bharat Electronics signed a $777 million deal with Israel Aerospace Industries to help fulfil the Barak-8 order.

On 28 November 2023, Bharat Heavy Electricals Limited (BHEL) received a contract worth ₹2,956.89 crore (equivalent to ₹32 billion or US$340 million in 2026) to manufacture 16 Upgraded Super Rapid Gun Mounts (SRGMs) or Strales Systems for in-service ships as well as the under construction Nilgiri-class frigates.

The state-owned firm Steel Authority of India Limited (SAIL) is supplying around 4,000 tonnes of steel for each of these ships. The steel is being manufactured in Bokaro, Bhilai, and Rourkela plants.

=== Features ===
==== Stealth ====
The frigate's design incorporates a significant degree of stealth and low radar-observability – through the utility of composite materials, radar-absorbent coatings and low-observable/radar-transparent technologies; the usage of the aforementioned materials assists the vessel in maintaining a low radar cross-section (RCS).

The vessel's physical profile also features a substantial level of stealth through the application of different physical forms – including an enclosed mooring deck, flush deck-mounted weapon systems and a reduced number of antennae.

The frigate's infrared signature, most specifically emissions from its propulsion exhaust and power generation machinery, are reduced through the application of Venturi effect and fluid injection, which helps to reduce the plume and hot metal temperatures of exhaust. To maintain acoustic silence, the frigate is equipped with propellers designed to have onset of cavitation at higher speeds to reduce hydrodynamic noise. In addition to the propellers, the vessel's hull also features special acoustic enclosures for some of the machinery to reduce the emission air-borne noise.

==== Modular profile ====
The P-17A frigates are the first major class of Indian-designed warships to be built using the methodology of integrated modular construction – a manufacturing process in which multiple modules (or "blocks") of a vessel's hull are pre-assembled/pre-outfitted independently, before being aggregated for final assembly.

In December 2015, MDL contracted Fincantieri S.p.A. to provide technical assistance and essential expertise in the construction of the seven frigates using the "modular construction" methodology.

=== Naming ===
The P-17A frigates were named after the former-Nilgiri-class frigates, which served in the IN between 1972 and 2013; the first six ships of the series were allotted the names utilised by the older class, namely – Nilgiri, Himgiri, Taragiri, Udaygiri, Dunagiri, and Vindhyagiri. The seventh and final vessel of the P-17A series, which did not have a namesake from the older class, was given the new name of Mahendragiri. The ships are given names of mountain ranges in India.

== Instrumentation ==
=== Armament ===
==== Anti-surface warfare ====
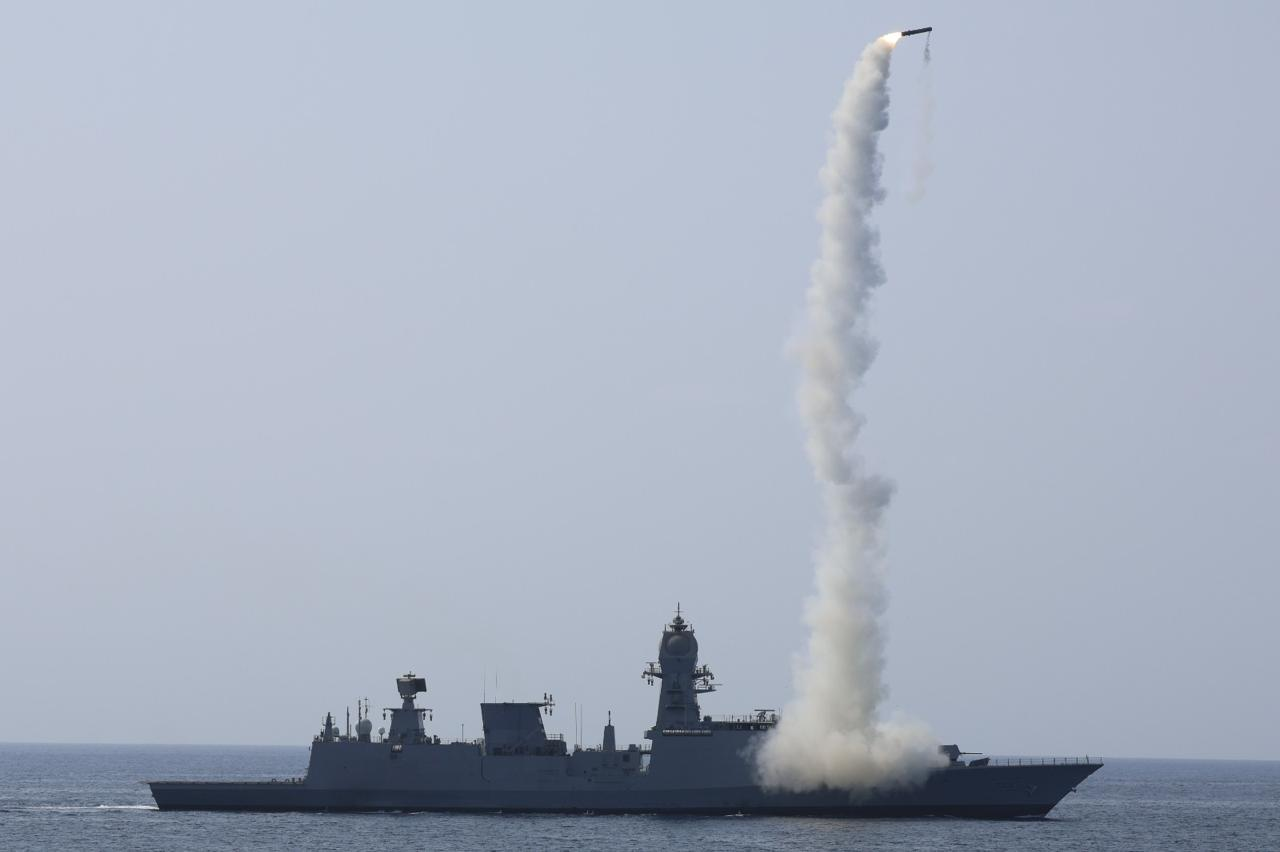
INS Nilgiri firing a Brahmos

As part of its anti-surface warfare (ASuW) capabilities, the class features eight VLS-launched BrahMos anti-ship cruise missiles, capable of speeds of up to Mach 3. The BrahMos is widely regarded as one of the most formidable anti-ship missiles currently in service, given the missile's extreme versatility and manoeuvrability.

The vessels are equipped with one upgraded BHEL Super Rapid Gun Mount naval gun for anti-missile/anti-aircraft roles. The upgraded guns manufactured by Bharat Heavy Electricals Limited (BHEL) features the Strales system with DART ammunition firing capability. However, INS Udaygiri features the original, older Compact variant of the gun as noted during its commissioning.

Originally, there were plans to install the Mk 45 127 mm (5 in) naval gun, manufactured by BAE; however, this plan was later scrapped in 2021 on account of financial constraints. The Otobreda 127/64 was also considered until the parent company (Finmecanica) of Oto Melara, the manufacturer, was blacklisted by the Indian defence ministry in 2015 from participating in its procurement tenders.

==== Anti-air warfare ====
As part of its anti-air warfare (AAW) capabilities, the class features thirty-two Barak 8 surface-to-air missiles, with eight missiles present in four 2×4 VLS configurations – with two placed at the bow and two placed aft.

The LR-SAM is an extended-range variant of the original Barak 8 and is designed to neutralize various aerial threats, including fighter aircraft, helicopters, anti-ship missiles, cruise missiles, ballistic missiles and unmanned aerial vehicles (UAV). This variant has a range of about 100 km (62 mi).

The ships are also equipped with two AK-630 each for close-in weapon system (CIWS) roles as well as multiple OFT-manufactured 12.7 mm M2 Stabilized Remote Controlled Gun.

==== Anti-submarine warfare ====
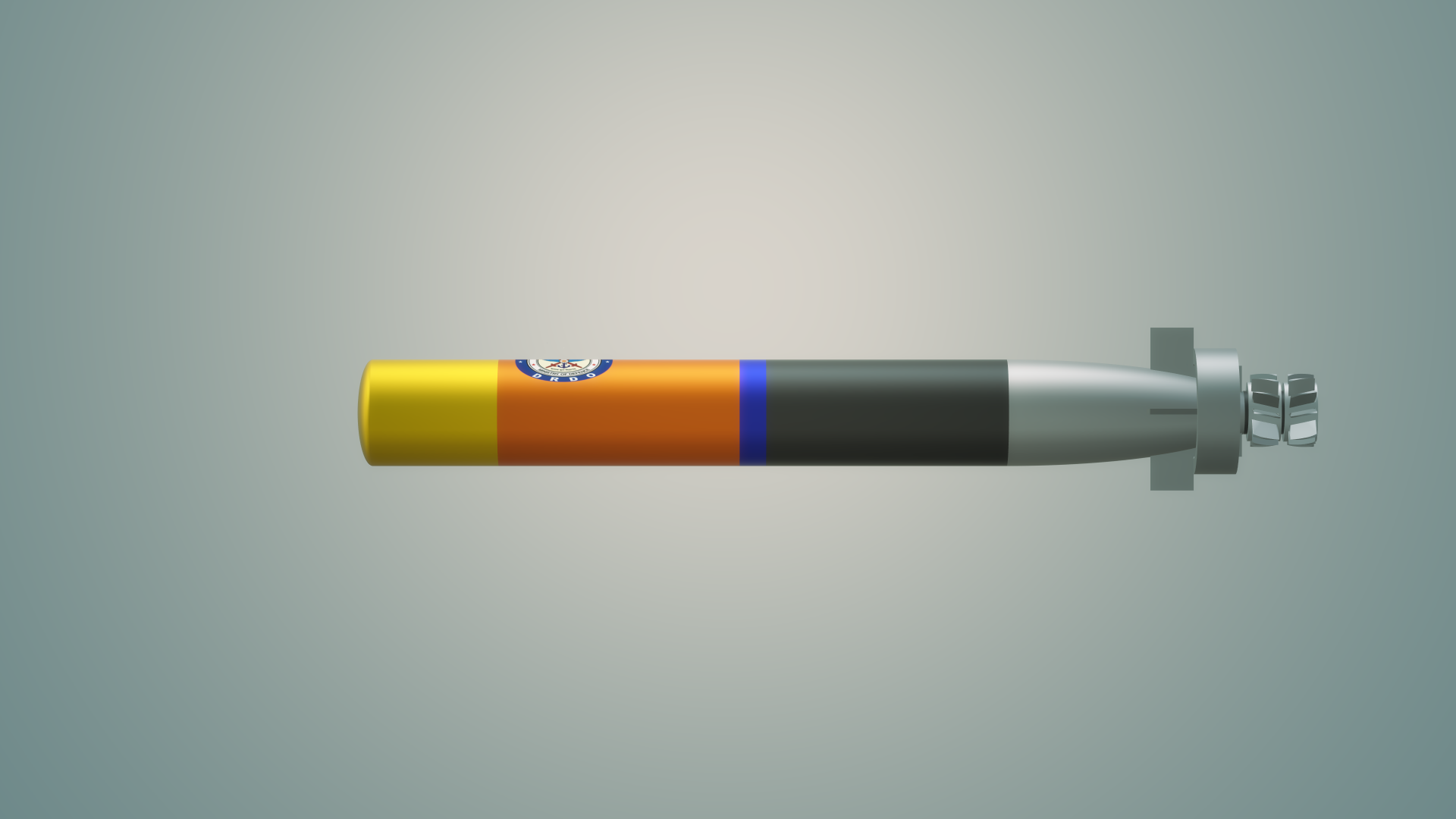
TAL Shyena Torpedo

As part of its anti-submarine warfare (ASW) capabilities, the class features two 324 mm triple-tube lightweight torpedo launchers for firing TAL Shyena torpedoes.

The class also features two RBU-6000 (RPK-8) anti-submarine rocket launchers, capable of firing ASW projectiles to depths of up to 1,000 m (3,280 ft 10 in). The launchers, designated Indigenous Rocket Launchers, have been manufactured indigenously by Larsen & Toubro.

==== Decoys ====
During the class' unveiling in 2018, the frigate's design was noted to possess two anti-torpedo decoy systems and four decoy launchers – which presumably may be the NSTL Maareech torpedo-countermeasure system and the Kavach anti-missile decoy launchers, respectively.

==== Aviation facilities ====
An animation of helicopter landing on frigate.

As part of its aviation facilities, the class is equipped with a flight-deck and an enclosed aviation hangar, capable of accommodating a single naval helicopter – most likely the ALH Dhruv MK-III maritime-reconnaissance helicopters, or the Westland Sea King Mk. 42B ASW/ASuW helicopters – both of which are operated by the Indian Naval Air Arm.

=== Sensors ===
==== Radar ====
The class features the EL/M-2248 MF-STAR active electronically scanned array (AESA) radar as its primary radar suite. The EL/M-2248 is a multi-function, phased-array radar system featuring an azimuth of 360^{o}, with the capability to track both aerial and surface targets, at a range of over 450 km (280 mi).

The class also features the Indra LTR-25 'Lanza' surface-search radar, as its secondary radar suite. The LTR-25 is a solid-state, three-dimensional (3D), long-range radar capable of operating in a dense electronic environment and features a range of over 250 nmi (460 km; 290 mi), with the capability to track various aerial targets – including fighter aircraft and ballistic missiles.

The frigates are also equipped with an advanced combat management system, classified as "CMS-17A", which is reportedly equipped with sophisticated data links for high, efficient interoperability with other naval vessels.

==== Sonar ====
The class is equipped with the BEL HUMSA-NG sonar, developed by the DRDO. The HUMSA-NG is a hull mounted "active cum passive" integrated sonar system capable of detecting, localizing, classifying and tracking sub-surface targets in both active and passive modes.

==== Electronic warfare ====
The frigates feature the Shakti electronic warfare (EW) suite – developed by the Defence Electronics Research Laboratory (DLRL), for defense against anti-ship missiles and for the interception, detection, classification, identification and jamming of conventional radars. Shakti is equipped with wide-band electronic-support measures (ESM), electronic countermeasures (ECM), an integrated "Radar Finger Printing System (RFPS)" and a data-recording replay feature for "post-mission analysis".

=== Propulsion ===
Each frigate is powered by two General Electric LM2500 gas turbines – manufactured by GE Aviation and two MAN 12V28/33D STC four-stroke engines – manufactured by MAN Diesel & Turbo, arranged in a combined diesel and gas (CODAG) propulsion configuration.

In December 2016, the IN contracted GE Aviation to supply fourteen LM2500 gas turbines for the seven frigates, which were license-assembled in India by the Industrial & Marine Gas Turbine Division (IMGT) of Hindustan Aeronautics Limited (HAL). Under the deal, HAL was additionally sanctioned to provide comprehensive services – including the supply of spare parts, maintenance inspections and equipment overhauls.

At the time of the order, HAL had already delivered eleven LM2500 turbines to the IN; the turbines are specifically used on multiple Indian warships, most notably on the Shivalik-class frigates.

In February 2019, MDL contracted GE to supply an assortment of auxiliary equipment to the IN to support the fourteen engines; under the agreement, GE also handled the design work of the frigate's auxiliary system and its fuel supply system.

In May 2016, the IN contracted MAN Diesel & Turbo to supply fourteen MAN 12V28/33D STC four-stroke engines for the seven frigates; under the deal, the requisite parts needed for the engines were sourced from India, while the engines' final assembly and testing were conducted at MAN's facility in Aurangabad, India.

In July 2026, Rolls-Royce announced that INS Dunagiri and INS Mahendragiri are equipped with four MTU 12V 396 TE54 generator sets.

== History ==
=== Background ===
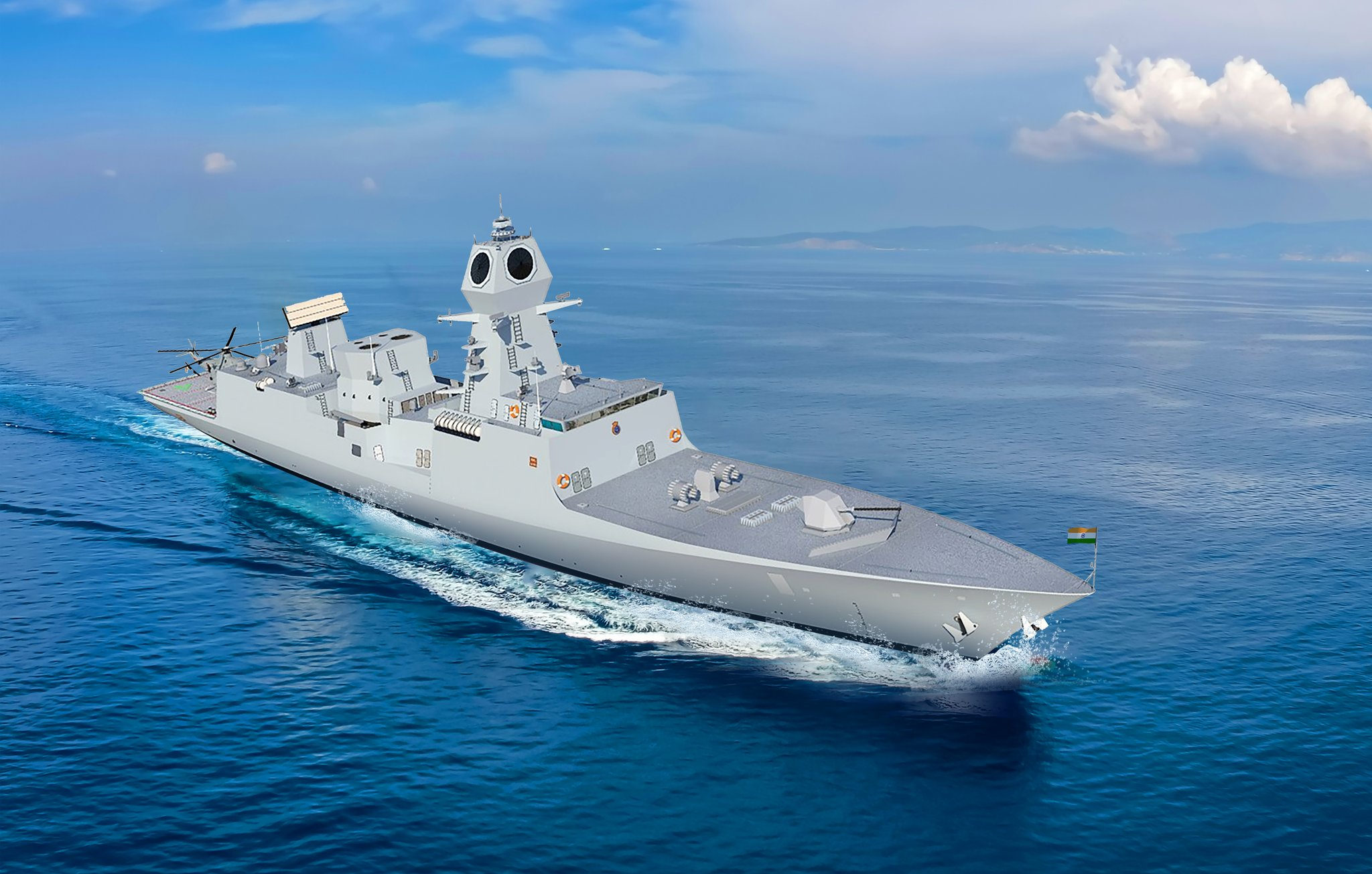
A rendering of the frigate's design

On 19 June 2009, the Defence Acquisition Council (DAC) — the main acquisition panel subordinate to India's Ministry of Defence (MoD) and chaired by the then Defence Minister of India A. K. Antony — cleared a proposal for the procurement of seven stealth frigates at a cost of ₹45,000 crore (equivalent to ₹1.2 trillion or US$13 billion in 2026) under the designation Project 17A, as an advanced variant of Shivalik-class frigates. The ships were to be constructed by Mazagon Dock Shipbuilders (MDL), Mumbai and Garden Reach Shipbuilders & Engineers (GRSE), Kolkata. The DAC also rejected the Navy's proposal of building two of the warships abroad. The construction of the warships will incorporate modular shipbuilding where 300-tonne prefabricated blocks would be put together similar to the construction style of INS Vikrant. Earlier, on 4 December 2006, the Navy had sent out a pre-tender Request for Information (RFI) to French DCNS, Italian Fincantieri, American firms Lockheed Martin and Northrop Grumman besides shipyards in Russia and Korea for the construction of the first two ships by one of the foreign shipyards so as to ensure the timely absorption of the technology by the Indian shipyards. The project is expected to start in 2011 after both MDL and GRSE completes an upgrade to allow the modular construction. The deliveries were to begin 3–4 years after start of construction. All the firgates are to be inducted by 2022.

As reported on 5 August 2013, the design of the Project 17A frigates along with Project 15B destroyers (now, Visakhapatnam-class destroyers) were completed by the Directorate of Naval Design (DND) of the Indian Navy. Additionally, the cost negotiations for the construction of the seven vessels had been completed. As part of the project, MDL and GRSE will construct four and three frigates, respectively. Now, the Navy was awaiting clearance from the government.

On 18 February 2015, the Cabinet Committee on Security (CCS) — India's top decision-making institution on matters related to defense and national security chaired by Prime Minister Narendra Modi — green-lighted the proposal for the Project 17A frigates at a cost of ₹45,381 crore (equivalent to ₹750 billion or US$7.8 billion in 2026). The contract would be signed in the same month with an initial payment of ₹4,000 crore (equivalent to ₹66 billion or US$680 million in 2026). The project is the follow-on of the Shivalik-class or Project 17 frigates and the first ship by each the shipyards is expected to be delivered in 2022.

=== Construction ===
==== Garden Reach Shipbuilders & Engineers ====
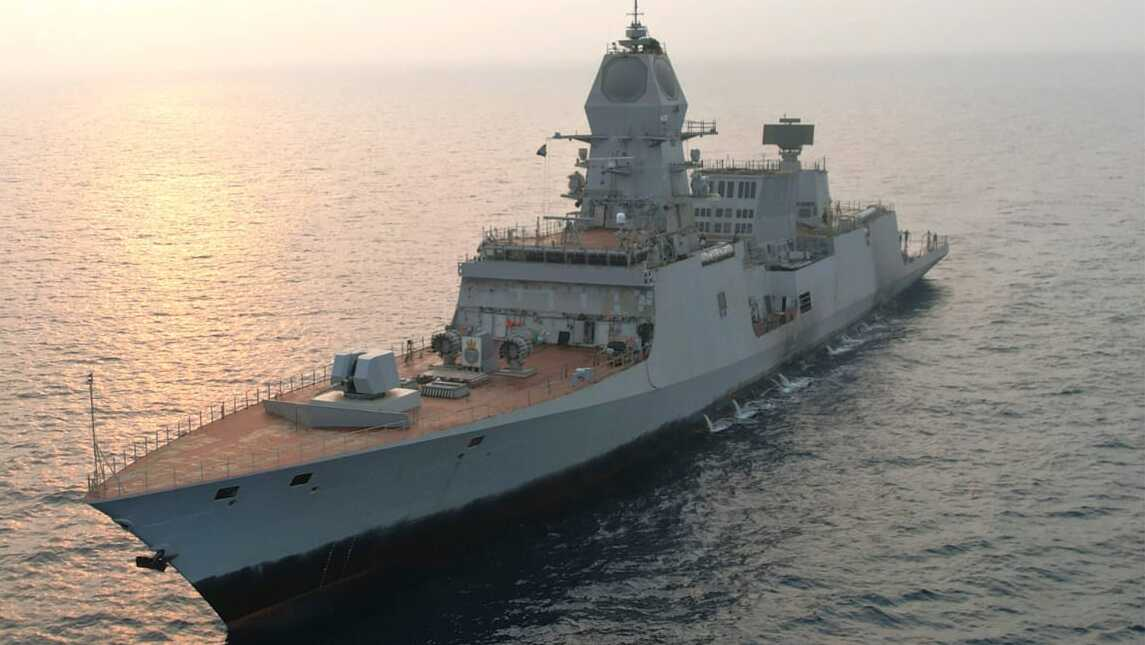
The sea trials of INS Himgiri, the first ship of the batch being built by GRSE.

On 20 February 2015, the Indian Navy signed the contract with the Garden Reach Shipbuilders & Engineers (GRSE), a Kolkata-based public-sector shipyard, to build three frigates under Project 17 Alpha at an estimated cost of ₹19,294 crore (equivalent to ₹320 billion or US$3.3 billion in 2026). According to the terms of the contract, GRSE is slated to deliver the three frigates in 2023, 2024 and 2025, respectively. The frigates would be constructed with "Integrated Construction Methodology" in partnership with Italy's Fincantieri. In preparation for the order, GRSE re-augmented its infrastructure by establishing newer, modular shipyards along with a Goliath gantry crane, meant for enabling the construction of the frigates in a short time frame.

A significant proportion of the hull's blocks needed for the vessel's construction was procured from smaller shipyards and metal fabrication shops in and around Kolkata, while the construction/fabrication of additional infrastructure was done at GRSE's Rajabagan shipyard.

Construction reached a hiatus in April 2018, when the shipyard's Goliath crane, having failed to withstand strong cyclonic winds which had been travelling at around 100 km/h (62 mph). The accident rendered the crane permanently inoperable, whilst the module hall - which was to have fabricated the modular blocks for the future frigates, was rendered unusable. However, no damage was reported to have been inflicted on the vessels that were being built by the shipyard, according to representatives from the IN and GRSE.

The mishap forced GRSE to modify the project's timeline, by prioritizing the construction of the modular blocks at its other facilities, rather resuming constructing post-repairs to the shipyard. With the loss of the crane, GRSE resorted to building smaller 50 t and 100 t blocks (instead of the regular 250 t blocks) with the shipyard’s smaller cranes. In 2021, GRSE installed a Goliath crane that had purchased from South Korea, with a lifting capacity of 250 t, thus resuming regular construction operations.

The construction of the first frigate began in November 2018, while work on the second and third frigates began in January 2020 and March 2021, respectively. The first of the three frigates, Himgiri, was launched on 14 December 2020, with its delivery slated to occur in August 2023. The second frigate, Dunagiri, was launched on 15 June 2022, with its delivery expected in 2024. The final frigate, Vindhyagiri, was launched in August 2023.

On 3 March 2025, GRSE completed the Contractor Sea Trials (CST) of INS Himgiri was completed by GRSE along with INS Androth. As per a press release, "CST is considered the final stage of construction, when a vessel’s seaworthiness is tested".

Himgiri was delivered to the Indian Navy on 31 July 2025 and was commissioned simultaneously with MDL's Udaygiri on 26 August 2025.

The second ship from the GRSE lot, Dunagiri, was laid down on 24 January 2020, and launched on 15 July 2022. The ship was delivered to the Indian Navy on 30 March 2026 along with INS Agray and INS Sanshodhak. The three ships were commissioned simultaneously during a tri-commissioning event on 21 June 2026 in Kolkata.

==== Mazagon Dock Shipbuilders Limited ====
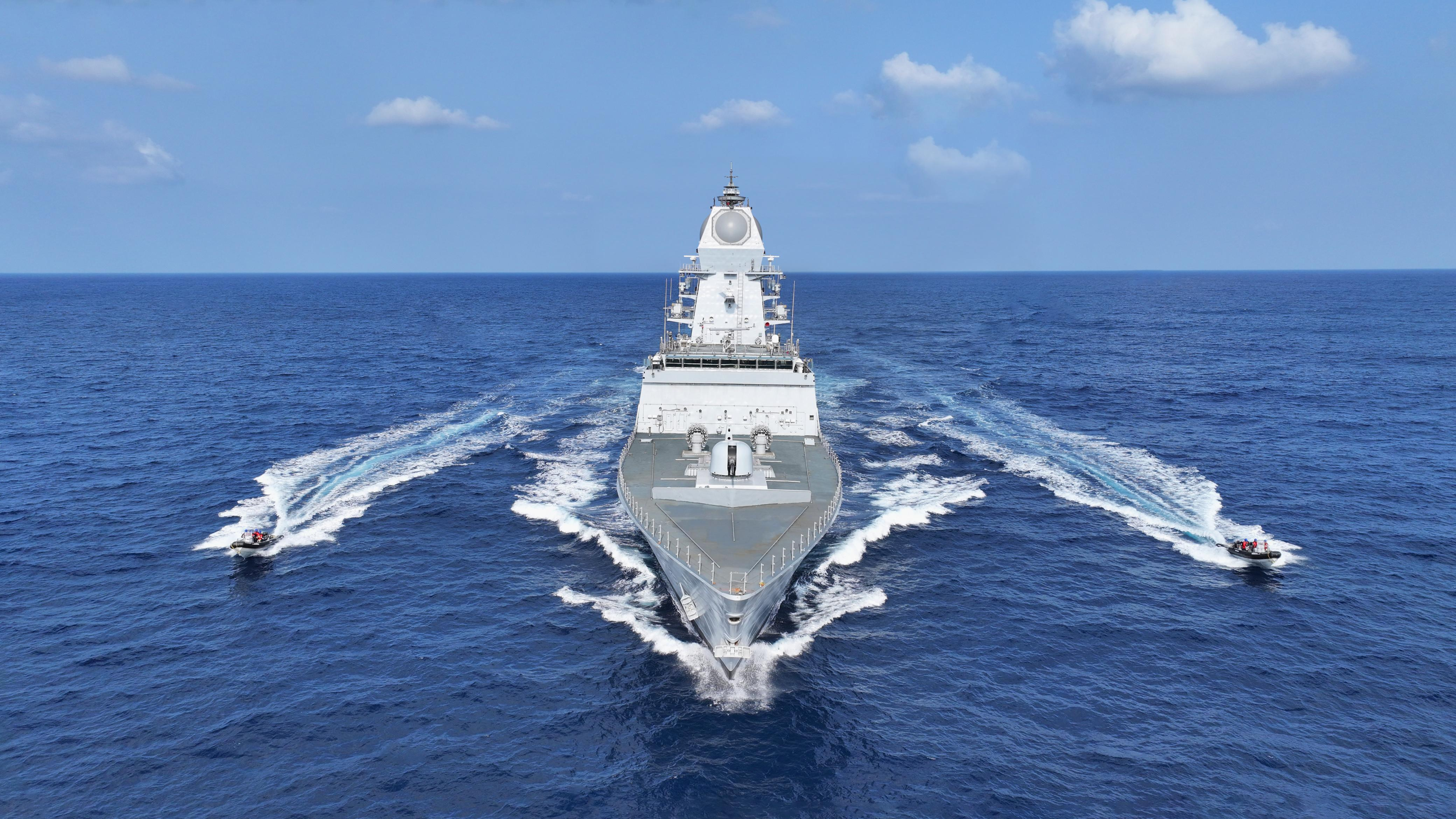
INS Udaygiri, the second ship from MDL, during sea trials

In February 2015, the IN contracted Mazagon Dock Shipbuilders Limited (MDL), a Mumbai-based public-sector shipyard, to build four P-17A frigates at an estimated cost of over ₹21,000 crore. According to the terms of the contract, MDL is to deliver the four frigates in 2022, 2023, 2024 and 2025, respectively.

The four frigates were built at different locations, namely, at MDL's main shipbuilding facility in Mumbai, at MDL's subordinate facility in Nhava, at a smaller shipbuilding facility also operated by MDL in Mumbai, at an MSE shipyard in Gujarat and at another shipyard in Goa. Similarly to GRSE, MDL also upgraded its existing infrastructure; the shipyard augmenting its existing facilities with newer equipment, including a "Goliath" gantry crane, a module workshop, a wet basin and a "cradle assembly" shop, meant to facilitate modular construction.

The construction of the first frigate began in December 2017, while work on the second, third and fourth frigates began in May 2019, September 2020 and June 2022, respectively. The first of the four frigates, Nilgiri, was launched on 28 September 2019, and began its sea trials five years later, in August 2024. The second frigate, Udaygiri, was launched on 17 May 2022, in a ceremony coinciding with the launch of INS Surat, a Visakhapatnam-class destroyer. The third frigate, Taragiri, was launched on 11 September 2022, and is scheduled to be delivered by 2025.

Nilgiri was commissioned into the Indian Navy service on 15 January 2025. The second ship, Udaygiri, was delivered to the Indian Navy on 1 July 2025 and was commissioned simultaneously with GRSE's Himgiri on 26 August 2025.

The third ship, Taragiri, was delivered to the Indian Navy on 28 November 2025 and commissioned on 3 April 2026. The final ship from the MDL, Mahendragiri, was delivered to the Indian Navy on 30 April 2026 and was commissioned on 11 July 2026.

== Ships in the class ==
Name	Pennant	Yard Number	Builder	Laid Down	Launched	Commissioning	Status
Nilgiri	F33	12651	Mazagon Dock Shipbuilders Limited (MDL)	28 December 2017	28 September 2019	15 January 2025	Active
Udaygiri	F35	12652	Mazagon Dock Shipbuilders Limited (MDL)	7 May 2019	17 May 2022	26 August 2025	Active
Taragiri	F41	12653	Mazagon Dock Shipbuilders Limited (MDL)	10 September 2020	11 September 2022	3 April 2026	Active
Mahendragiri	F38	12654	Mazagon Dock Shipbuilders Limited (MDL)	28 June 2022	1 September 2023	11 July 2026	Active
Himgiri	F34	3022	Garden Reach Shipbuilders & Engineers (GRSE)	10 November 2018	14 December 2020	26 August 2025	Active
Dunagiri	F36	3023	Garden Reach Shipbuilders & Engineers (GRSE)	24 January 2020	15 July 2022	21 June 2026	Active
Vindhyagiri	F42	3024	Garden Reach Shipbuilders & Engineers (GRSE)	5 March 2021	17 August 2023	Q4 2026	Launched

either scheduled or estimated dates

== Export ==
In August 2024, the Mazagon Dock Shipbuilders offered to the Brazilian Navy, the project for a joint construction of up to six Project-17 Alpha frigates, to attend the requirement of Brazil for a new class of 6,000 tons vessels, to operate in conjunction with the newest Tamandaré-class frigates.

== Gallery ==
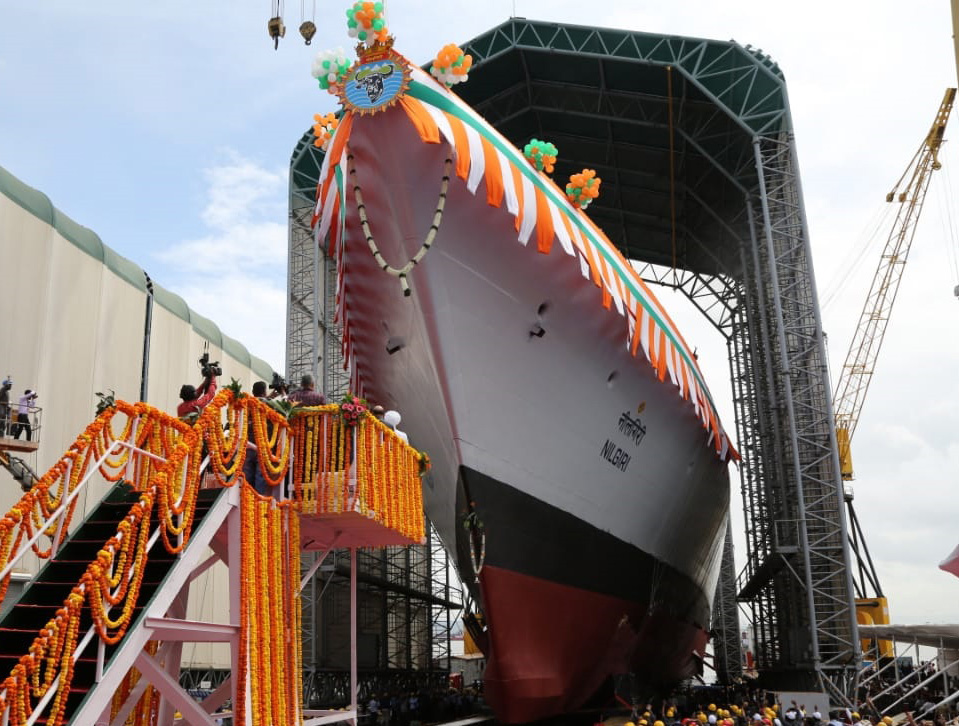
The launch of INS Nilgiri, the lead vessel of the class.

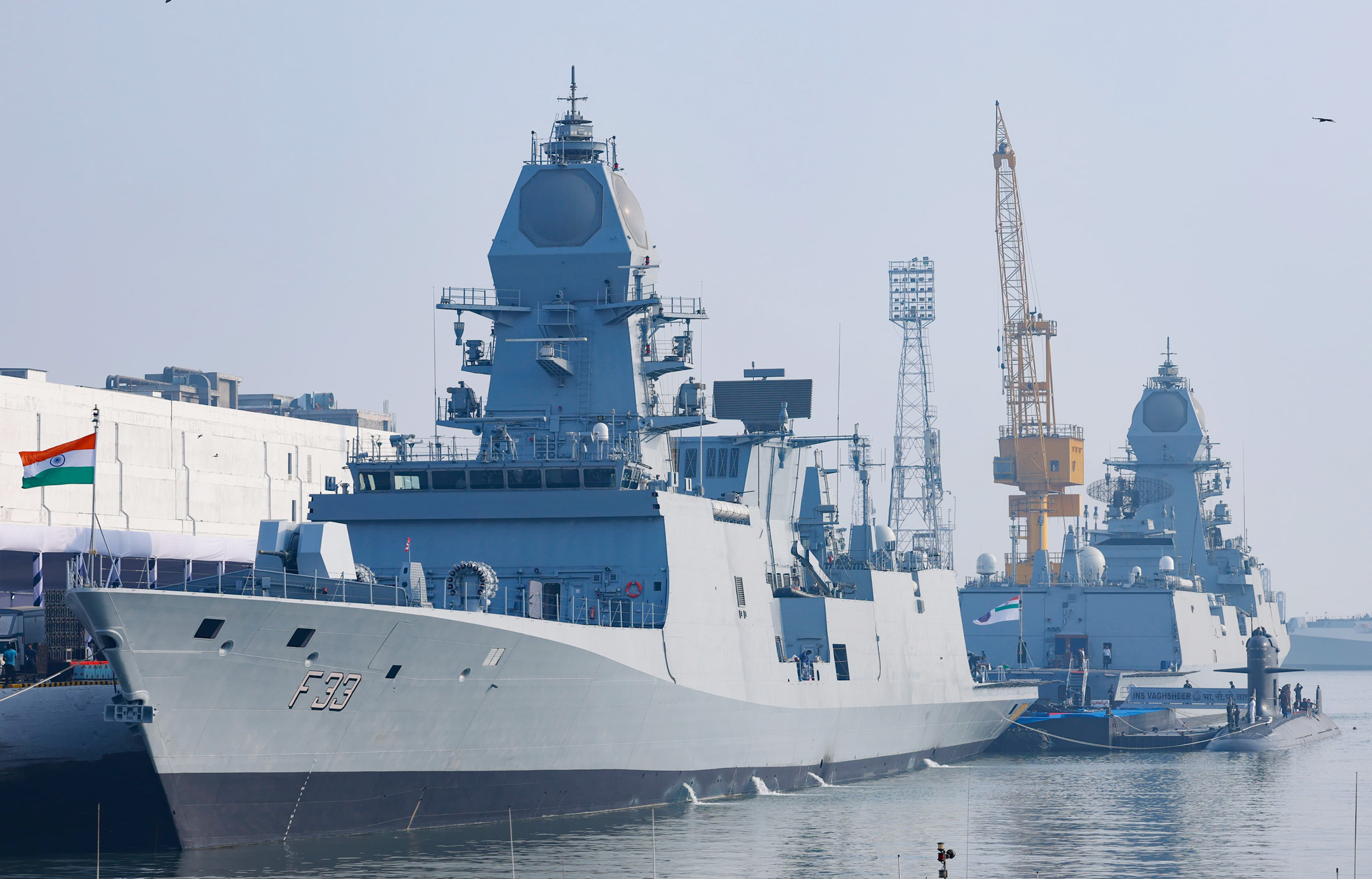
INS Nilgiri during commissioning ceremony

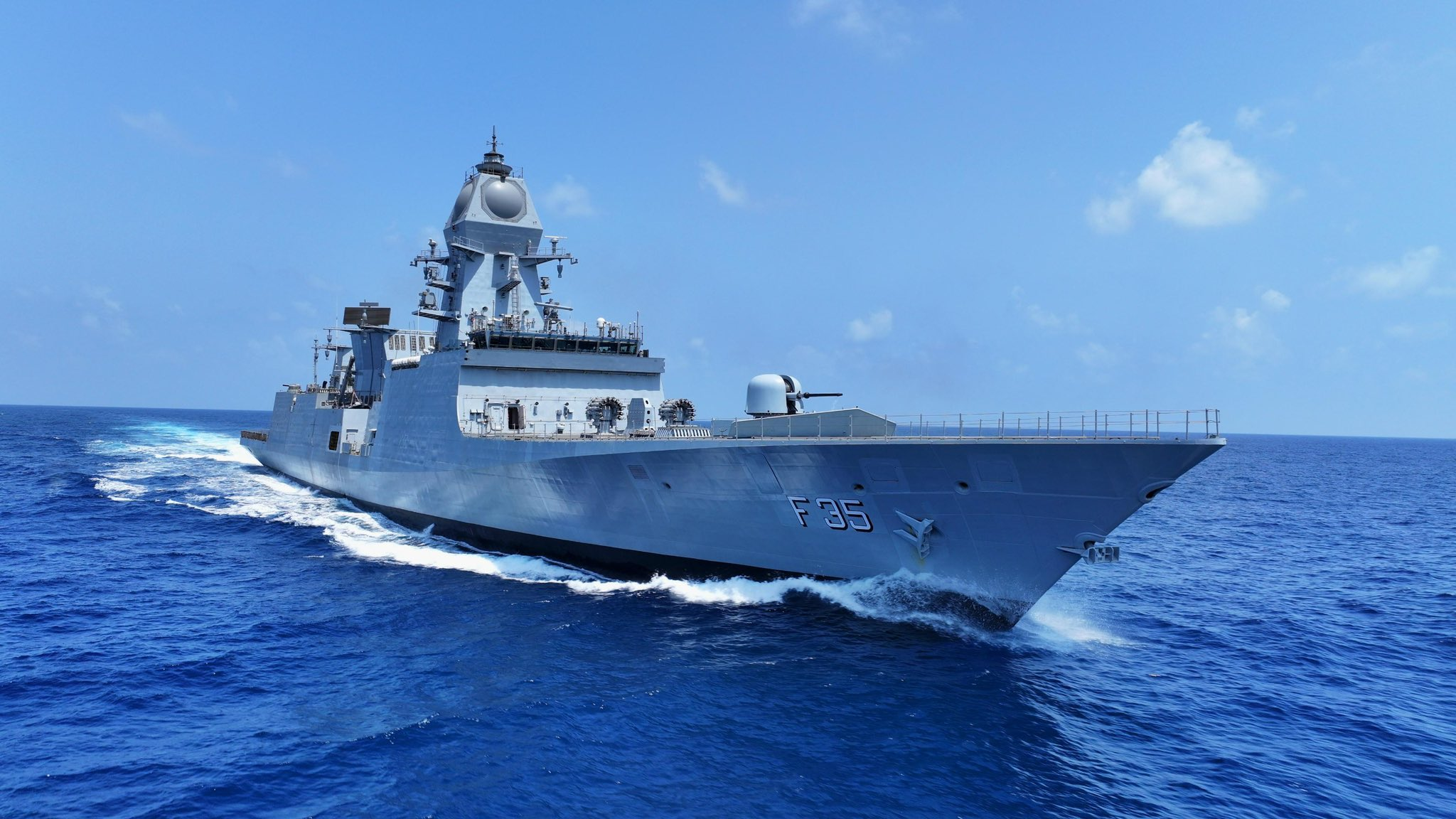
Udaygiri during sea trials

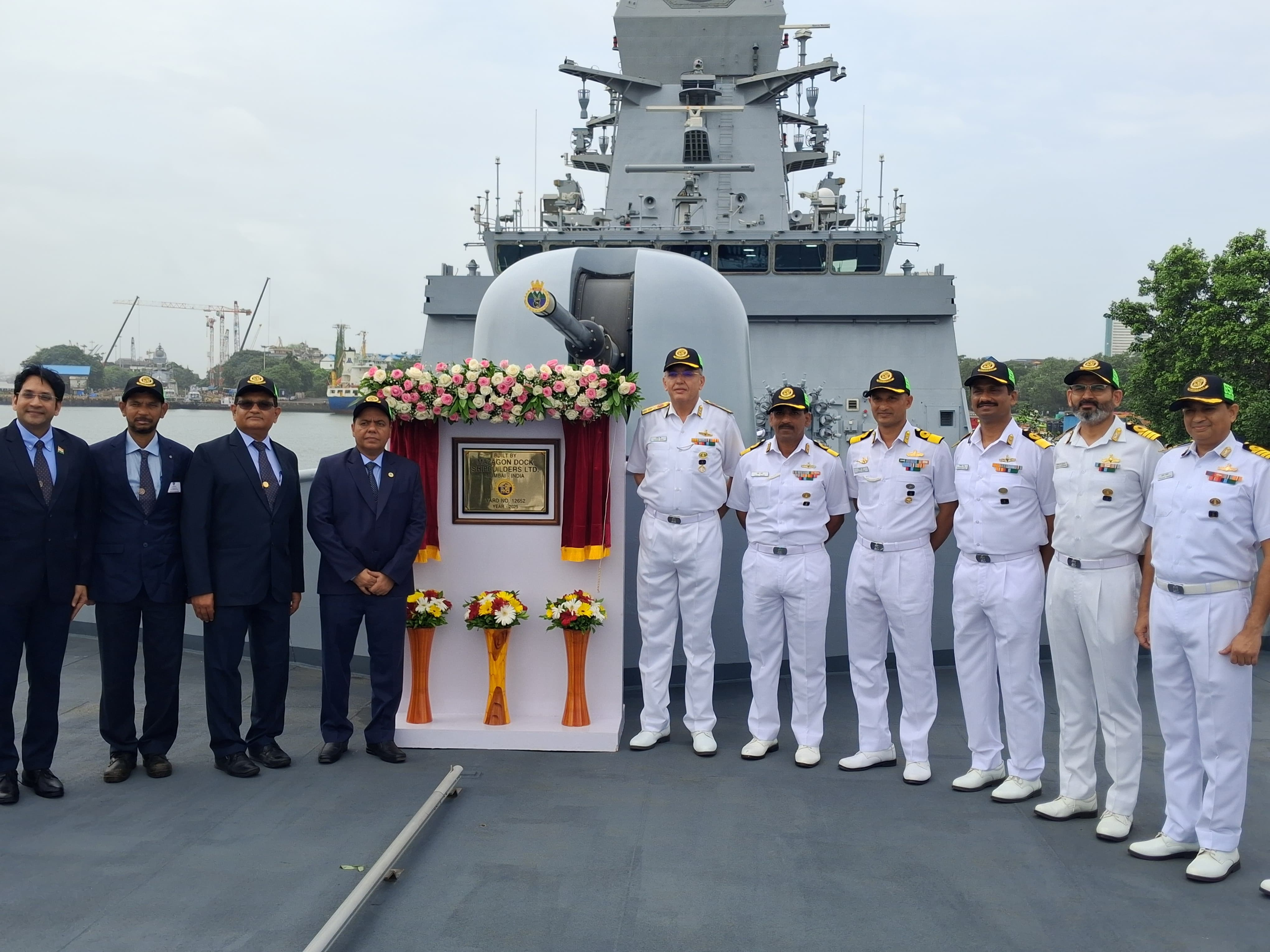
INS Udaygiri during commissioning ceremony in July 2025

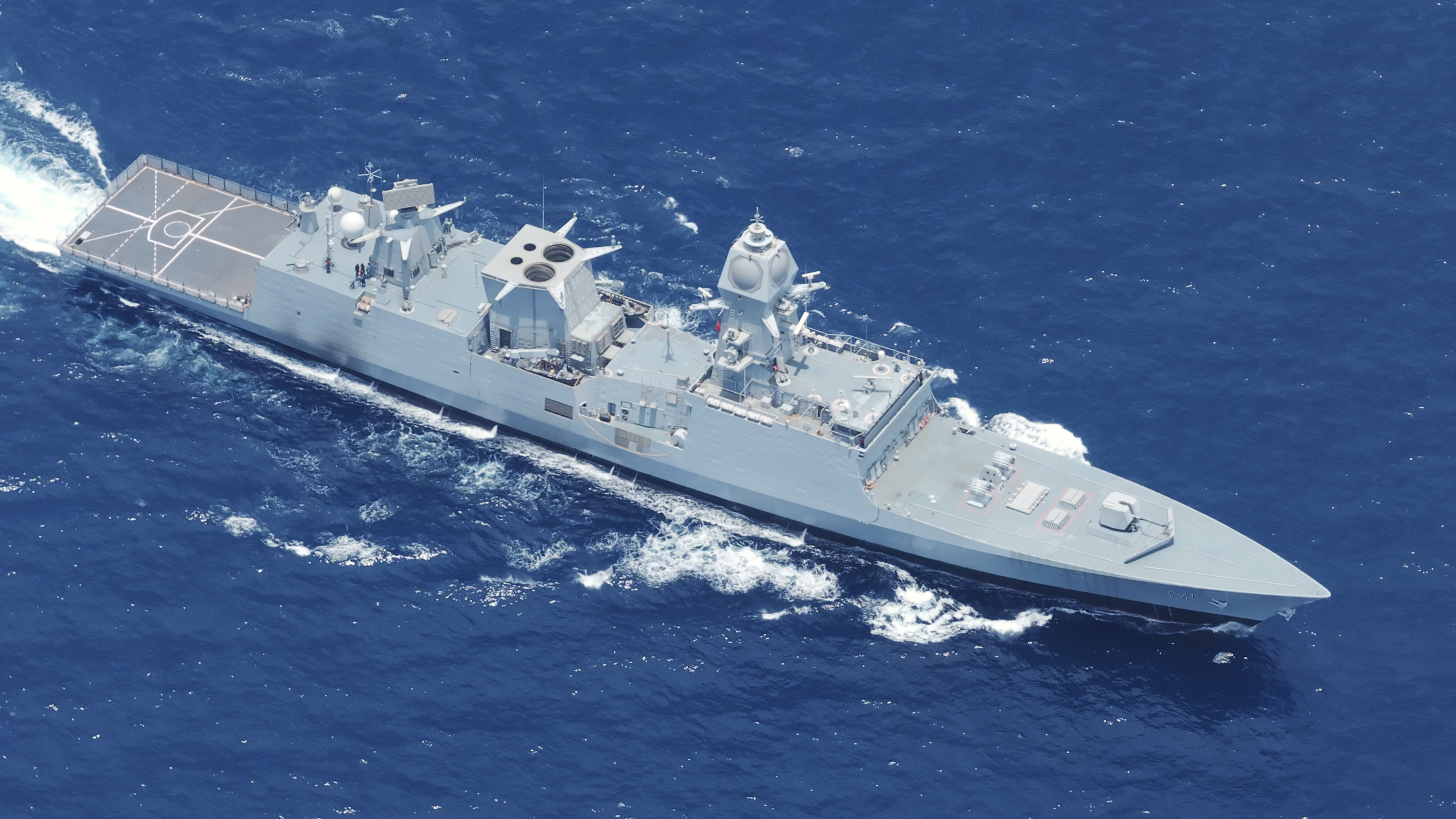
INS Taragiri top view

== See also ==
=== Frigates of comparable configurations and capabilities ===
- FREMM multipurpose frigate – A series of multi-purpose frigates, operated by the French Navy, the Italian Navy, the Royal Moroccan Navy, the Egyptian Navy and currently being built for the United States Navy and the Indonesian Navy.
- Type 054B frigate – A class of multi-purpose frigates operated by the People's Liberation Army Navy of China.
- Type 26-class frigate – A class of frigates ordered by the Royal Navy, the Royal Canadian Navy and the Royal Australian Navy.
- Niedersachsen-class frigate – A class of frigates that had been planned for the German Navy. (cancelled)
- Mogami-class frigate – A class of multi-mission frigates currently being built for the Japan Maritime Self-Defense Force.
- F110-class frigate – A planned class of multi-purpose frigates that are to be built for the Spanish Navy.
- Admiral Gorshkov-class frigate – A class of guided-missile frigates operated by the Russian Navy.
- Constellation-class frigate – A series of multi-purpose frigates originally planned for the United States Navy. (cancelled)

=== Other references to the Indian Navy ===
- Future ships of the Indian Navy
- List of active Indian Navy ships
