= Naval Dockyard (Visakhapatnam) =

Dockyard in Visakhapatnam, Andhra Pradesh, India

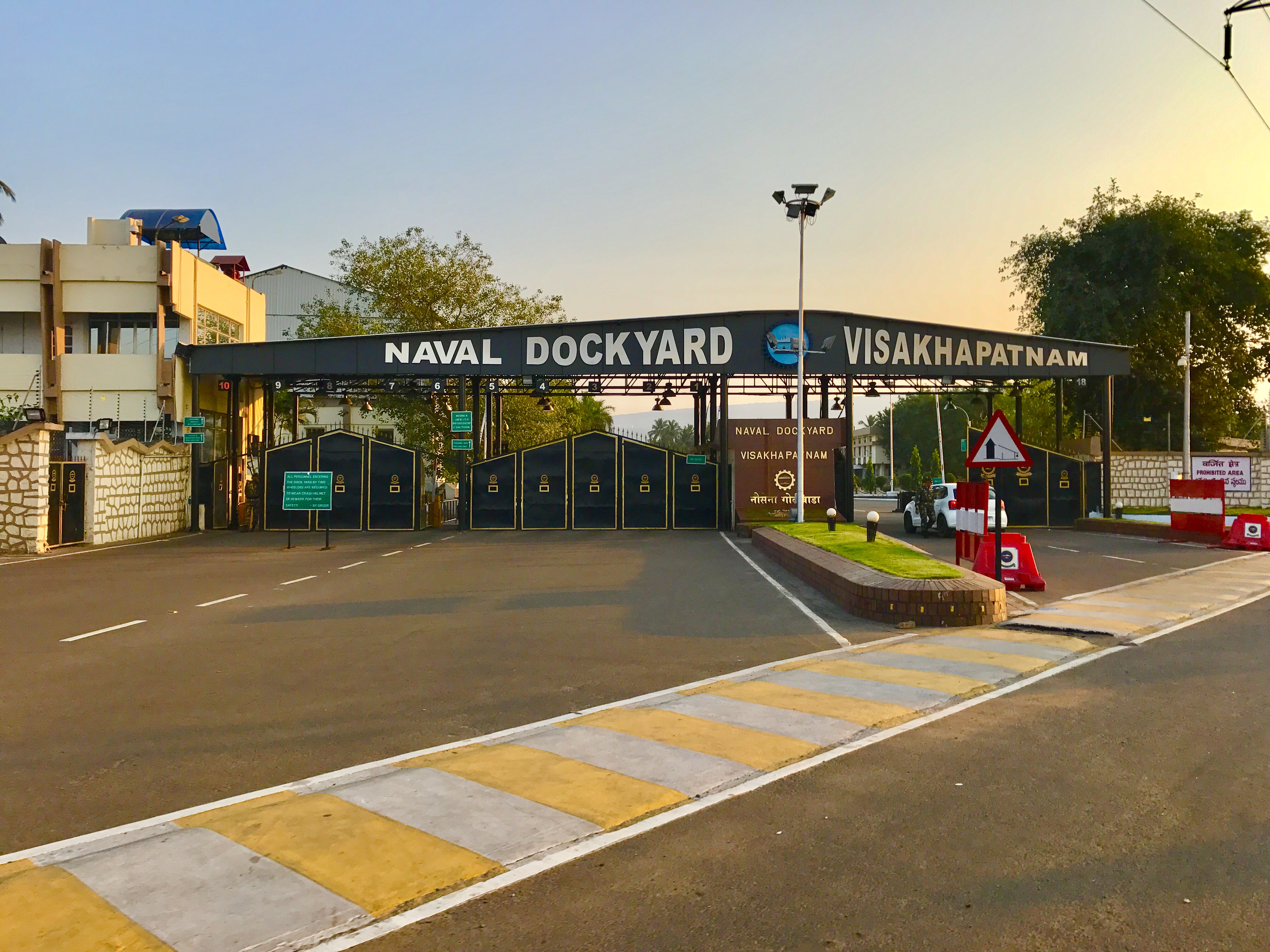
- Interactive map of Naval Dockyard (Visakhapatnam)

Location
- Country: India
- Location: Visakhapatnam, Andhra Pradesh
- Coordinates: 17.700°N 83.266°E

Details
- Opened: 1949
- Type of harbour: Shipyard
- Activities: Ship building Ship repair

The Naval Dockyard (Visakhapatnam) abbreviated as ND (V), is located in Visakhapatnam, Andhra Pradesh and is one of the most important dockyards in India, after the Naval Dockyard (Mumbai).

== History ==
In December 1941, shortly after the beginning of World War II in Europe, the Royal Indian Navy set up a "Boat Repair Workshop" in Visakhapatnam to support the Indian army units in Burma. In March 1942, as part of the Navy's initiative to set up coastal forces in several Indian coastal cities, the facility in Visakhapatnam was upgraded to include blacksmith and carpentry workshops, and machine tools, all of which were hosted abroad the naval base INS Circars. This was further upgraded to a centre for maintenance of ships with a 200-tonne slipway in 1947. In 1953, the facility was expanded into a Base Repair Organisation (BRO) and existing workshop units moved into the new BRO complex.

In 1958, the Union Cabinet approved the proposal for establishing a naval base and dockyard in Visakhapatnam. In 1962, a new jetty and a workshop building were sanctioned, as well as the acquisition of 550 acres of land from the Port Trust. In 1972, the BRO was renamed to Naval Dockyard.

As of 2016, the Dockyard includes three dry docks and spreads over 704 acres of land. The dockyard had repaired 22 ships and submarines in a year.
