= Kavach (anti-missile system) =

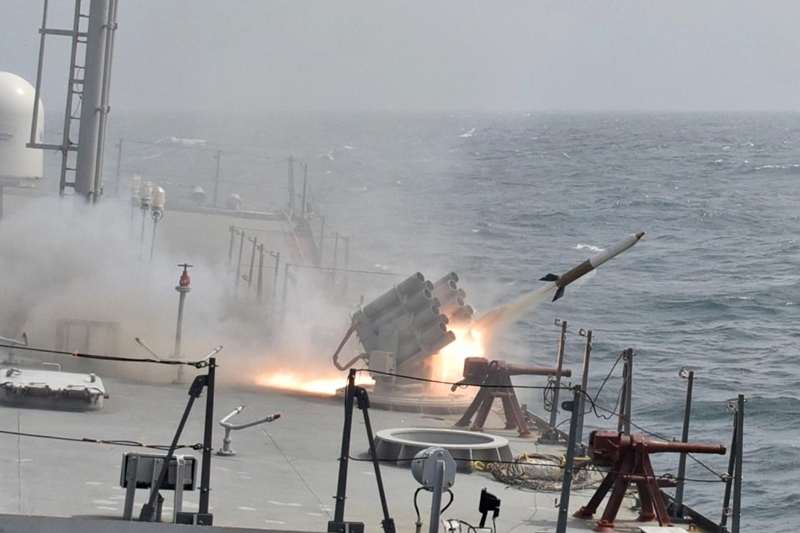
- INS Chennai (D65) launching a Kavach rocket.
- Type: Decoy system
- Place of origin: India

Service history
- In service: May 2012−present
- Used by: Indian Navy

Production history
- Designer: Ordnance Factory Board: Rocket launcher: Machine Tool Prototype Factory, Ambernath under Armoured Vehicles Nigam; Rockets: Ammunition Factory Khadki under Munitions India
- Produced: 2012−present
- Variants: Long-range, medium-range and short-range rockets

Specifications

Kavach (lit. 'armour') is a naval chaff decoy system developed by the Ordnance Factory Board for the Indian Navy. It uses rockets to disperse chaff intended to divert radar-guided anti-ship missiles from ships.

== Development ==
The Indian Navy previously procured chaff rocket systems from the Soviet Union. Supplies came to a halt following the dissolution of the Soviet Union in the early 1990s. The Ordnance Factory Board (OFB) took up the challenge to design and develop a chaff rocket system to achieve self-reliance in this field. OFB Director General and Chairman, D.M. Gupta, stated in May 2011 that the company had created two prototypes, successfully conducted the first trial, and would conduct a second and final trial later that year before the system was inducted into the Navy.

== Design ==
The Kavach decoy system releases chaff made up of silver coated glass fiber. The chaff forms a clutter which remains suspended in the air, causing the incoming radar-guided missile to mistake the chaff for the actual target, and get locked onto the chaff instead of the actual target. Each Kavach rocket costs around ₹6 lakh (US$6,200)–₹7 lakh (US$7,300).

The Kavach system has chaff rockets of three different versions based on the range:

- Long Range: 12 km (7.5 mi)
- Medium Range: 5 km (3.1 mi)
- Short Range: 1 km (0.62 mi)

These versions are fired in different situations based on incoming threats.

The Kavach Mod II is a three-layered "soft-kill" system. The launch tube configuration is 4×4 launch tube in two variants: Long-Range and Short-Range. The LR and SR variant weighs 1680 kg and 1350 kg, has a height of 269 cm and 246 cm, and bore of barrel measurement of 106 mm and 98.4 mm, respectively. Length and width of both the systems measures 1300 mm each. According to official sources, 9 such systems are installed on Kolkata-class, Kamorta-class and Deepak-class naval ships. It has a rotation speed of 60° per second. The Fire Control System (FCS) for the Kavach Mod II includes a Main Fire Control System (MFCS), 4 Launcher Control Unit (LCU) and a Remote Fire Control System (RMFCS). It can detect, track and engage upto 5 threats.

There are different operational modes

- Confusion Mode: Used against enemy search radar at a distance of 30 km or more. The mode launches Long-Range Chaff Rocket (LRCR I/LRCR II) to deliver chaff at 5–12 km away and 800 meters height from launcher to prevent the enemy from locating the ship.
- Distraction Mode: Used against incoming missile at 20 km or more before opening its homing head, Medium Range Chaff Rocket (MRCR) launched to deliver chaff 2–4 km away and 800–1000 meters height from launcher.
- Centroid Mode: To protect against a "Locked on" missile at a distance of 10 KMS or less launch Short Range Chaff Rocket (SRCR) to deliver chaff at 50–150 meters height from launcher.

== Production ==
In May 2012, Ammunition Factory Khadki (AFK), near Pune, handed over the first batch of Kavach rockets to the Indian Navy. The Kavach Mod II launchers are manufactured by the Machine Tool Prototype Factory at Ambernath, Maharashtra, a unit of Armoured Vehicles Nigam. The Fire Control System (FCS) is manufactured by Bharat Electronics Limited (BEL).

AFK was contracted to deliver around 4,000 Kavach variants to the Indian Navy by 2015.

== Operators ==
The first ship to be equipped with Kavach was the anti-submarine corvette INS Kamorta (P28). Ship classes fitted with Kavach include:

- Indian Navy
  - Kamorta-class corvettes
  - Kolkata-class destroyers
  - Shivalik-class frigates
  - Visakhapatnam-class destroyers
  - Deepak-class fleet tanker
  - INS Vikrant
  - Next Generation Corvette
