= Chennai Port =

Container port in India

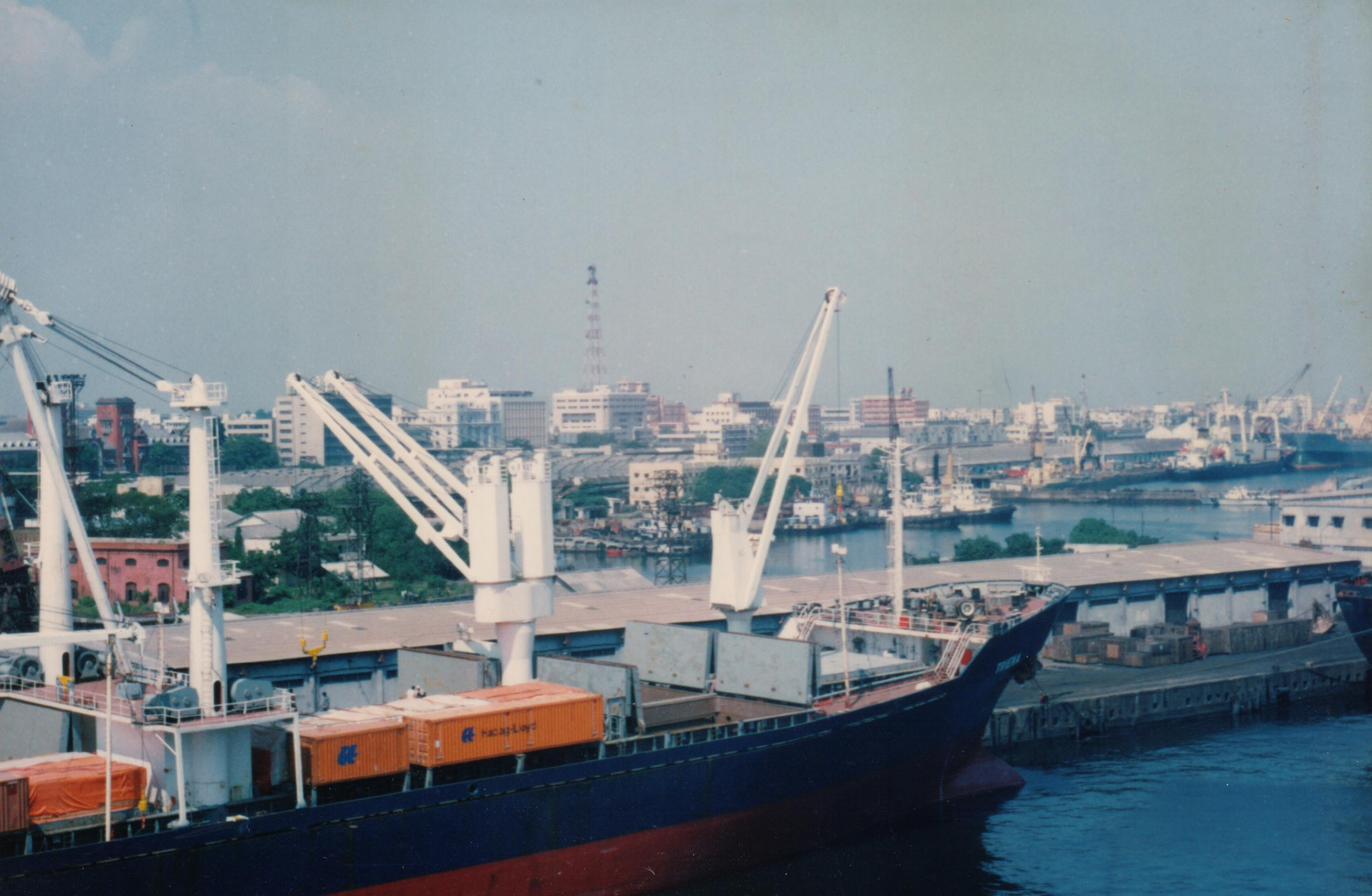
- Chennai Port in 1996
- Interactive map of Chennai Port

Location
- Country: India
- Location: Chennai (Madras)
- Coordinates: 13.08441°N 80.2899°E
- UN/LOCODE: IN MAA

Details
- Opened: 1881; 145 years ago
- Operated by: Chennai Port Trust
- Owned by: Chennai Port Trust, Ministry of Ports, Shipping and Waterways, Government of India
- Type of Harbor: Coastal breakwater, artificial, large seaport
- Size of harbour: 169.97 ha (420.0 acres)
- Land area: 237.54 ha (587.0 acres)
- Size: 407.51 ha (1,007.0 acres)
- No. of berths: 27
- Employees: 2,846 (2023-24)
- Chairman: Shri Sunil Paliwal, I.A.S.
- Main trades: Automobiles, motorcycles and general industrial cargo including iron ore, granite, coal, fertilizers, petroleum products, and containers Major exports: Iron ore, leather, cotton textiles, Automobiles; Major imports: Wheat, raw cotton, machinery, iron & steel
- World Port Index Number: 49450
- UN/LOCODE: INMAA

Statistics
- Annual cargo tonnage: ▲51.60 Million (2023–24)
- Annual container volume: ▲1,589,540 TEU (2023–24)
- Passenger traffic: ▼58,257 (2023–24)
- Annual revenue: ▲₹1,051.67 crore (US$110 million) (2023–24)
- Net income: ▲₹116.21 crore (US$12 million) (2023–24)
- Vessels handled: 2,675 (2023-24)
- Website www.chennaiport.gov.in

Chennai Port, formerly known as Madras Port, is the second largest container port of India, behind Mumbai's Jawaharlal Nehru Port also known as Nhava Sheva. The port is the largest one in the Bay of Bengal. It is the third-oldest port among the 12 major ports of India with official port operations beginning in 1881, although maritime trade started much earlier in 1639 on the undeveloped shore. It is an artificial and all-weather port with wet docks. Once a major travel port, it became a major container port in the post-Independence era. An established port of trade of British India since the 1600s, the port remains a primary reason for the economic growth of Tamil Nadu, especially for the manufacturing boom in South India, and has contributed greatly to the development of the city of Chennai. It is due to the existence of the port that the city of Chennai eventually became known as the Gateway of South India.

The port has become a hub port for containers, cars and project cargo in the east coast of India. From handling a meagre volume of cargo in the early years of its existence, consisting chiefly of imports of oil and motors and the export of groundnuts, granite and ores, the port has started handling more than 60 million tonnes of cargo in recent years. In 2008, the port's container traffic crossed 1 million twenty-foot equivalent units (TEUs). As of 2011, the Chennai Port was ranked the 86th largest container port in the world with plans to expand the capacity to about 140 million tonnes per annum. It is an ISO 14001:2004 and ISPS-certified port and has become a main line port having direct connectivity to more than 50 ports around the world.

== History ==
=== Before the 1800s ===
The port around 1870

Although the settlement of Madras did not form until after the mid-17th century, the region surrounding the present-day port remained an important center for military, administrative, and economic activities since the 1st century CE under various South Indian dynasties, namely, the Pallava, the Pandya, the Chola and the Vijayanagara empires. Chief among them was the Pallava dynasty, which reigned from the 6th to 9th centuries CE. The ancient town of Mylapore, known to Roman traders as "Meliapor", was an important port of the Pallavas and is now part of Chennai.

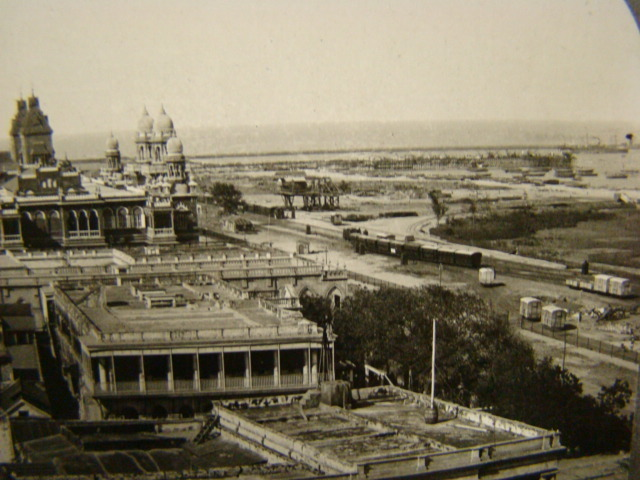
The harbour as viewed from the city in the 1910s

The region also attracted many distant civilisations, with the Christian apostle St. Thomas believed to have preached in the area between 52 and 70 CE. In 1522, the Portuguese built the São Tomé harbour, named after St. Thomas, on the site of today's port and the São Tomé church on the grave of Saint Thomas. The following years saw the arrival of other Europeans, namely, the Dutch arriving at Pulicat in 1613 and the British arriving in 1639. In 1639, the British East India Company bought a three-mile long strip of land lying along the coast between the Cooum delta and the Egmore River encompassing an area of about five square kilometres from the Vijayanagara King Peda Venkata Rayalu. Soon obtaining permission from the regional ruler, Damarla Venkatadri Nayakudu, the British built a warehouse and factory on the site, and in 1640, the British expanded the occupation by building the Fort St. George and establishing a colony on the site of the future port of Madras.

In 1746, under the leadership of Admiral La Bourdonnais, French forces captured and plundered Madras, the fort and surrounding villages. However, they returned the town along with the port to the British under the Treaty of Aix-la-Chapelle in 1748. The British then strengthened the fort to defend the port not only from the French but also from the increasingly powerful Sultan of Mysore and other regional rulers.

=== Colonial era ===
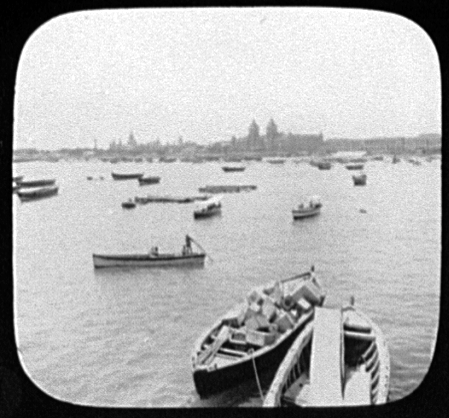
A view from the Madras harbour in 1895

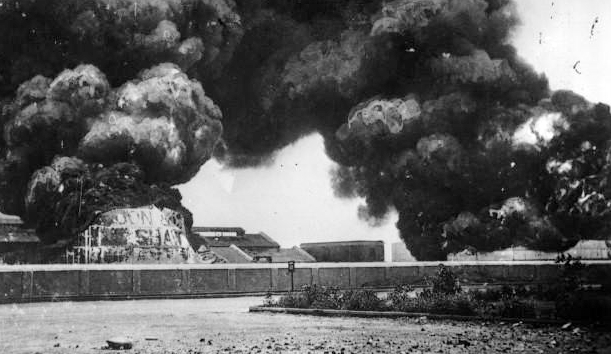
Oil tanks on fire in the Madras Harbour following the bombardment by German light cruiser Emden on 22 September 1914

By the late 18th century, most of the southern region of India had been conquered by the British and Madras was established as the capital of the Madras Presidency. During this period, the port flourished under the British rule, becoming an important naval base and urban center. A port at Madras was first suggested by Warren Hastings in 1770 when he was posted here, who later became the first Governor General of India. However, it was not until the 1850s that work began on a pier to berth vessels following suggestions from the Madras Chamber of Commerce and Industry. Till 1815, it was an open roadstead and exposed sandy coast, swept by occasional storms and monsoons. At the time, the natural harbour was so shallow that ships had to anchor over 1 km (0.62 mi) offshore, and cargo was delivered to and from the shore in masula boats and catamarans. Cargo losses were high, close to 90 percent, in addition to pilfering with several goods from the ships often taken to the nearby evening bazaar. A 335 m (1,099 ft) iron-screw pile pier capable of berthing larger vessels was built perpendicular to the shore in 1861. However, the storms of 1868 and 1872 made the initial piers inoperative. In 1875, Edward VII laid the foundation stone for a new port, and the masonry work for L-shaped breakwaters was started in 1876. The northern and southern groynes of the harbour were constructed, to create a still water enclosure that would be unaffected by storm and surf water. However, the groynes collapsed in 1877. The same year, construction of the south pier was commenced with concrete blocks weighing 33 tonnes each brought from Pallavaram, and the port started handling ships inside the harbour from 1881. However, again the storm of 12 November 1881 completely washed the almost-completed harbour, breaching over half a mile of breakwater. An artificial harbour was then built and the operations were started in 1881, and the pier was rebuilt in 1885, although there was a demand for relocating the entrance. Work on the harbour was completed in 1911. The Chennai Port Trust has taken the year 1881, the year of rebuilding, as the starting year. The cargo operations were carried out on the northern pier, located on the northeastern side of Fort St. George in Chennai. In the first couple of years the port registered traffic of 300,000 tonnes of cargo handling 600 ships. The first railway line in South India was laid between Madras and Arcot which started operating in 1856. By the late 19th century, the port was well connected to the other two important cities in the British colony, viz. Bombay (Mumbai) and Calcutta (Kolkata). In 1904, a new northeastern entrance was added to control siltation in the basin, after closing the original eastern entrance. The port's quays (berths) were constructed at different periods—the South Quay I in 1913, the five west quay berths between 1916 and 1920, the north quay in 1931 and the South Quay II in 1936, in the Inner Harbour, later christened Dr. Ambedkar Dock. Chennai was the only Indian city to be attacked by the Central Powers during World War I when a German cruiser, SMS Emden, shelled the oil depot within the port belonging to the Burmah Oil Company and raided vessels in 1914 disrupting trade, resulting in the death of at least 5 sailors. Other than Calcutta, which was practically taken over by the American army, Chennai port was the only other operational one in eastern waters during the Second World War. In 1911, the Royal Madras Yacht Club (RMYC), which is based within the Chennai Port premises, was founded by Sir Francis Joseph Edward Spring, the first chairman on the Madras Port Trust who was responsible for Chennai becoming a trading hub, especially during World War II. In 1916, the harbour office building was constructed.

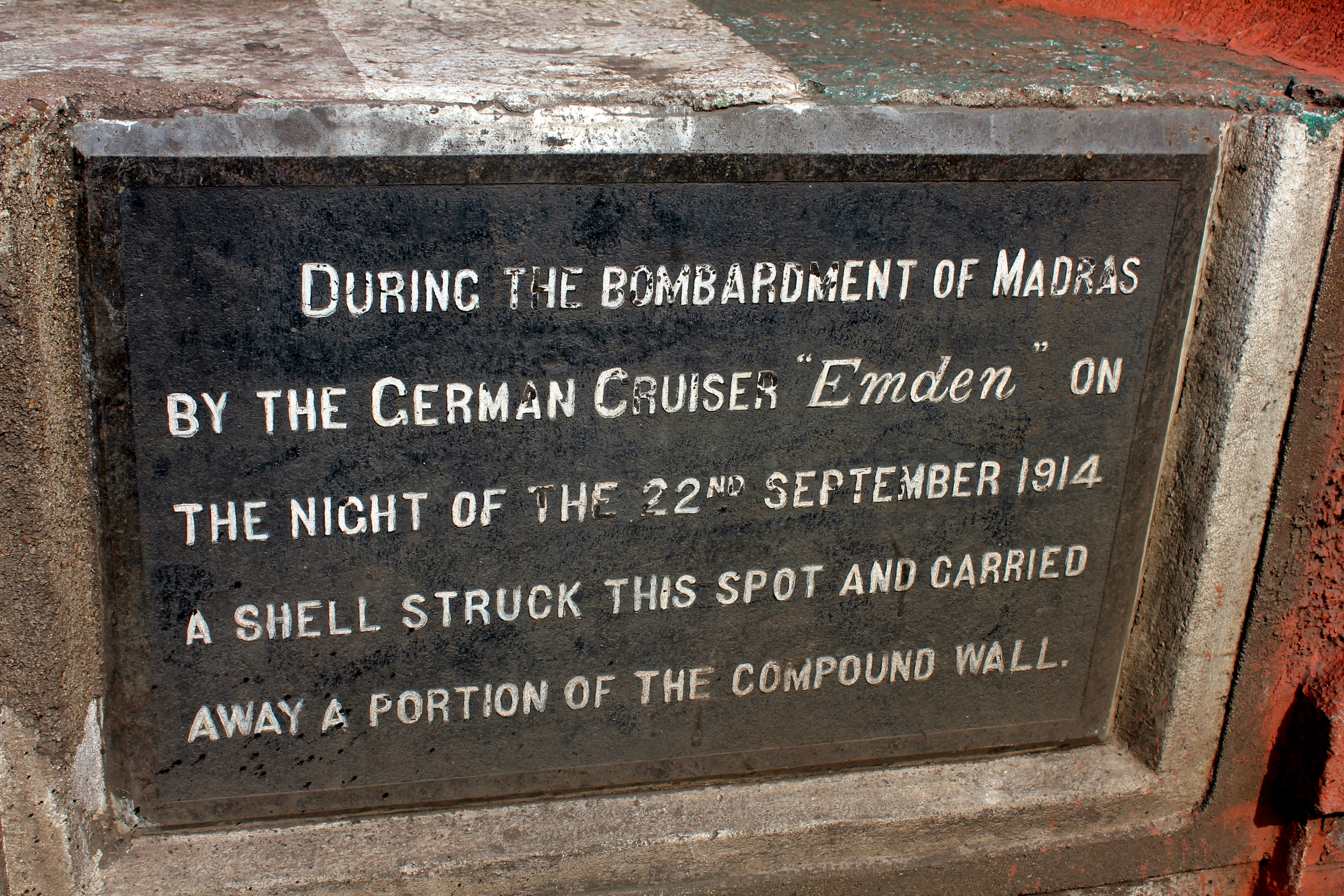
A plaque near Madras High Court

From 1905 to 1919, major improvements took place in the port under the stewardship of the visionary Sir Francis Spring. Being an artificial harbour, the port was vulnerable to cyclones and accretion of sand inside the basin due to underwater currents, which reduced the draft. To charter the course of the port development, Spring, who assumed charge as the chief engineer of the port in 1906, drew a long-term plan in a scientific manner to overcome challenges, both artificial and natural. The shifting of the entrance of the port from eastern side to the northeastern side protected the port to a large extent from the natural vulnerabilities. By this time, the port covered an area of 400 acres. By the end of 1920, the port had a dock consisting of four berths in the west quays, one each in the east and south quay along with the transit sheds, warehouses and a marshalling yard to facilitate the transfer of cargo from land to sea and vice versa. In 1929, the Mercantile Marine Department, which was working directly under the Ministry of Shipping till the establishment of the Directorate General of Shipping at Mumbai in 1949, was established to implement the first SOLAS and Load Line conventions. Additional berths were added in the 1940s with a berth at south quay and another between WQ2 and WQ3. The year 1946 saw the establishment of the Port Health Organisation. In 1947, when India gained independence, Chennai became the capital of the Madras State, renamed as Tamil Nadu in 1969.

=== Post-Independence ===
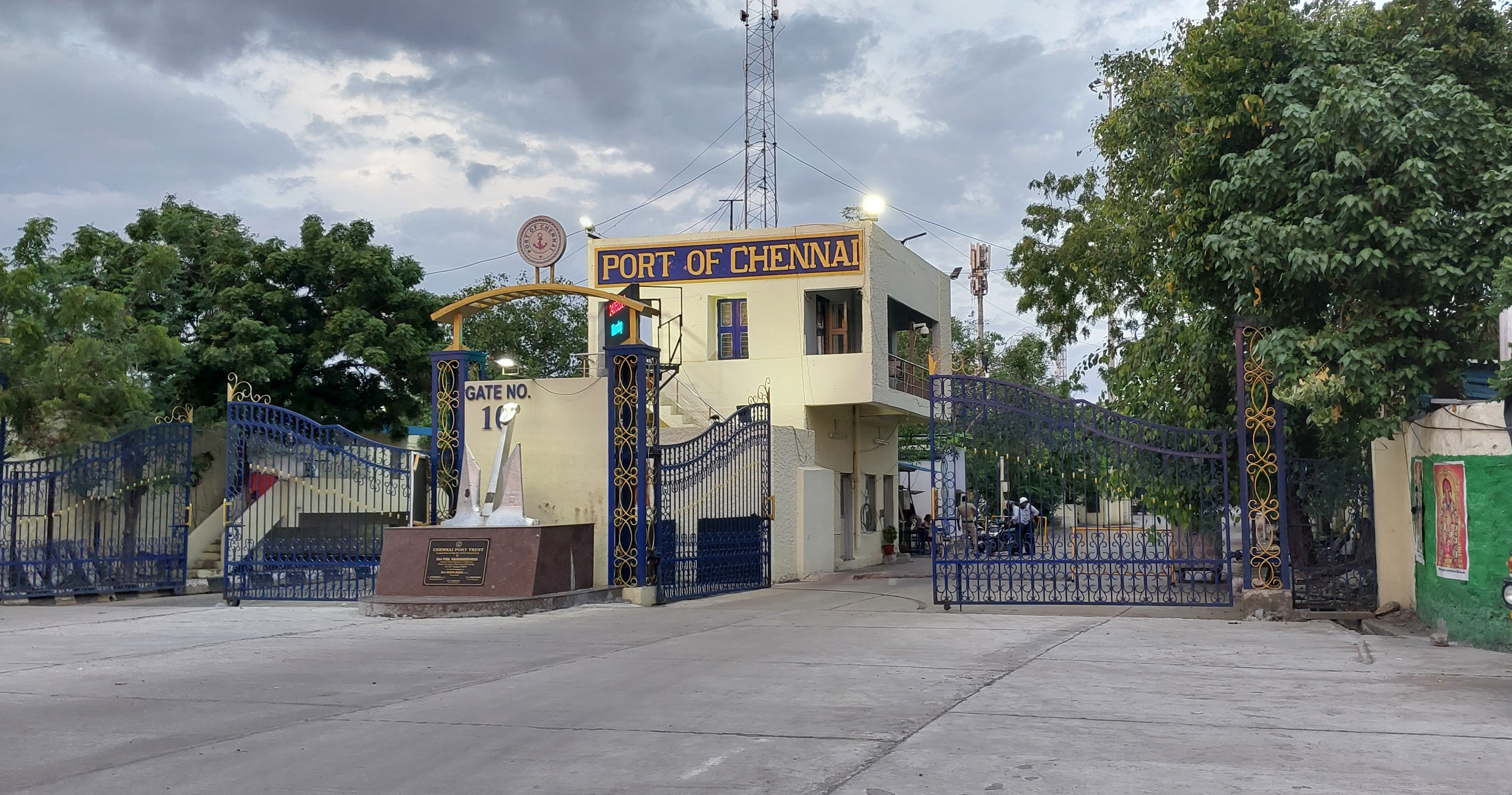
Entrance of the Chennai Port

Post-Independence, the development of the port gained momentum. In 1959, a passenger station on the first floor of the transit shed at north quay was commissioned. In 1961, construction of signal station at north quay was completed. In the same year, the port's Jawahar Dock was inaugurated by the then prime minister of India, Lal Bahadur Shastri. In 1964, the Jawahar dock with capacity to berth 6 vessels to handle dry bulk cargoes such as coal, iron ore, fertiliser and non-hazardous liquid cargoes was created on the southern side changing the topography of the port. To handle vessels with as much as 16.2 m (53 ft) draft, the port developed the outer harbour, named Bharathi Dock, for handling petroleum in 1972 and for mechanised handling of iron ore in 1974. In 1972, the first oil jetty was constructed at Bharathi Dock-I capable of handling tankers up to 100,000 DWT to handle imports of crude oil destined for the Manali Oil Refinery (later named the Chennai Petroleum Corporation Limited). In 1974, the iron ore berth was added to the port for exports to Japan and other countries in the Far East. The second oil jetty was added at Bharathi Dock-III in 1986 capable of handling tankers up to 140,000 DWT to meet increasing demands for crude oil and petroleum products. The iron ore terminal is equipped with mechanised ore-handling plant commissioned in 1977 at Bharathi Dock-II capable of handling ore carriers of maximum size 1,45,000 DWT, one of the three such facility in the country, with a capacity of handling 8 million tonnes and a loading rate of 6,000 tonnes per hour. The port's share of iron ore export from India is 12 percent. The dedicated facility for oil led to the development of oil refinery in the hinterland. This oil terminal is capable of handling Suezmax vessels.

In the 1970s, containerisation started in India in a limited way with the creation of interim container handling facilities at Mumbai and Cochin ports in 1973. During the same period, Chennai Port began handling containerised cargoes. In 1983, a container terminal was built at the Bharathi Dock with a 380-metre (1,250 ft) quay, a 51,000-square-metre (550,000 sq ft) container yard, and a 6,000-square-metre (65,000 sq ft) container freight station, which was commissioned by the then prime minister Indira Gandhi on 18 December 1983 as the country's first dedicated container terminal facility. The terminal was provided with tow-shore cranes and other shore facilities. In 1991, the port's container terminal quay was lengthened by 220 m (720 ft) with two additional tow shore cranes. In November 2001, the container terminal and back-up area was privatised through a 30-year concession with Chennai Container Terminal Private Limited. Continually increasing container traffic resulted in another 285-metre (935 ft) extension of the quay in 2002, bringing the total berth length to 885 metres (2,904 ft). During 2008–09, the port recorded a 17.2-percent share of container traffic in India. Having the capability of handling fourth-generation vessels, the terminal is ranked among the top 100 container ports in the world. To meet the demand in container handling, the port is added with the second container terminal with a capacity to handle 1.5 million TEUs. The port is also planning a mega container terminal, capable of handling 4 million TEUs per annum expected to be operational from 2013, when the first phase of the project will be completed. The full project will be completed by 2017.

When the city of Madras was renamed as Chennai in 1996, the Madras Port Trust followed suit and was renamed as Chennai Port Trust. In 2000, the port began to handle pure-car-carrier shipments of automobiles. In 2003, the 200 m naval berth was given for 30-year lease. The 2004 tsunami devastated the shores of the port, taking many lives and permanently altering the coastline.

== Location and geography ==
Tide	Height (m)
Highest high water level (HHWL)	1.50
Mean high water spring (MHWS)	1.10
Mean high water neap (MHWN)	0.80
Mean sea level (MSL)	0.54
Mean low water neap (MLWN)	0.40
Mean low water spring (MLWS)	0.10
Indian springs low water level (CD)	0.00
Mean spring range	1.00
Mean neap range	0.40

Chennai Port lies on a flat coastal plain known as the Eastern Coastal Plains on the east coast of the Indian peninsula known as the Coromandel Coast in the Bay of Bengal. The bed slope is fairly flat. The port is situated on the thermal equator and is also coastal, which prevents extreme variation in seasonal temperature. The climate is tropical, specifically tropical wet and dry, and for most of the year, the weather is hot and humid, with temperatures ranging from a maximum of 42 °C in May to a minimum of 18 °C in January. The mean minimum temperature is 18 °C in January and 26.8 °C in May. The mean highest temperature is 29.3 °C in December and 39.6 °C in May. The port gets most of its seasonal rainfall from the northeast monsoon winds, from mid-September to mid-December. Occasionally, cyclones in the Bay of Bengal hit the coast. The average annual rainfall in the region is about 1298.11 mm, with 443.5 mm during southwest monsoon (June–September), 753.1 mm during northeast monsoon (October–December), 37.3 mm during winter season (January–February) and 64.2 mm during hot weather (March–May). The monthly average varies from 7 mm in April to 308 mm in November. Humidity ranges from 63 to 83 percent during January–March, from 57 to 72 percent during April–June and from 70 to 81 percent during October–December.

The tides in the port area are semi-diurnal in nature, that is, occurrence of two high and two low waters every day. The spring tides are up to 1.2 m (3 ft 11 in). The mean tidal range varies from 0.914 m to 1.219 m at spring and from 0.805 m to 0.610 m at neap tides. The change in water levels combined due to astronomical tide, wind setup, wave setup, barometric pressure, seiches and global sea level rise are estimated as 1.57 m, 1.68 m and 1.8 m at 15 m, 10 m and 5 m depth contours, respectively. Waves ranging from 0.4 m to 2.0 m in the deep water around Chennai harbour have been experienced with the predominant being 0.4 m to 1.2 m with wave periods predominantly in the order of 4 to 10 seconds. During cyclone season, waves of height exceeding 2.5 m are common. The predominant wave directions during southwest and northeast monsoons are 145° from north and 65° from north, respectively.

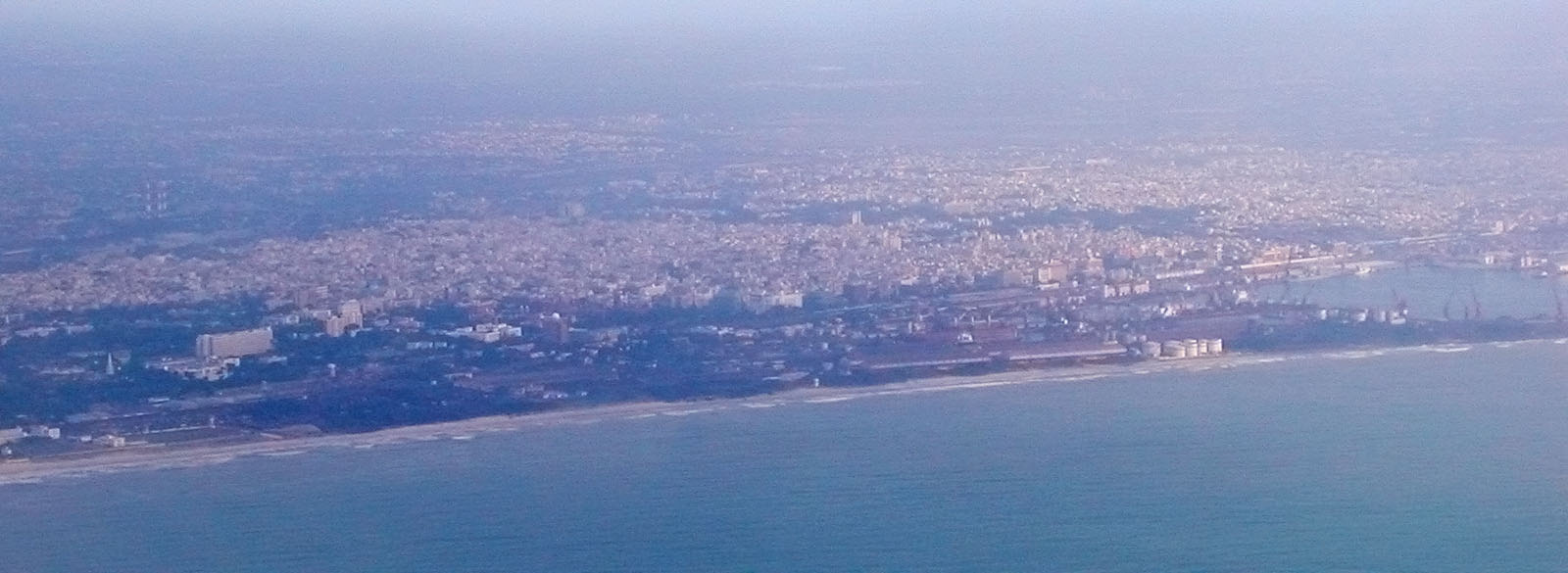
Chennai Port from the air

The most prevailing winds in the region are the southwesterly between April and October and the northeasterly during the rest of the year. The predominant wind direction is mostly from W and SW direction during the rainy season and SW and NW during post-monsoon month. However, during January to March, winds from NE and E direction are predominant. During the northeast monsoon, that is, between October and January, the direction of wind is generally NE and NNE. During depressions in northeast monsoon, the wind velocity goes up to 50 km/h and up to 105 km/h during cyclones of duration 2 to 3 days. Gusts of 160 km/h have been occasionally experienced. During southwest monsoon between March and September, the wind blows predominantly from the south. During June, July and August, strong wind is experienced from southwest direction in mornings, from south during afternoons, and from southeast during nights. Wind direction is between 153° and 263° relative to the north, and the wind speed varies from 2 to 12 m/s.

Situated on a coast that constitutes chiefly of sandy shelving breaker-swept beaches, the region surrounding the port falls under Seismic Zone III indicating a moderate risk of earthquake. The port was developed into the sea by reclaiming land as there is no sheltered harbour. The depth of the draft is up to 17 m, and the soil in the entrance channel is predominantly sandy and silt. The port is bordered by the Cooum delta in the south and Royapuram fishing harbour in the north. Visibility in the harbour region is good throughout the year and low visibility is commonly associated with heavy rains during the northeast monsoon.

Historically, the port was responsible for the shoreline changes in the region, where the area south of the port has accreted significantly, resulting in the formation of the Marina Beach, whereas the coast in the northern region has undergone severe erosion. Ever since the harbour was constructed, the coast north of the harbour has been experiencing erosion at the rate of about 8 m annually. The shoreline has recessed by about 1,000 m with respect to the original shoreline in 1876. It is estimated that 500 m of beach has been lost between 1876 and 1975 and another 200 m between 1978 and 1995. About 350 ha land in the coast north of the port is lost into sea. On the other hand, the area south of the port is increasing 40 sq m every year due to the progradation.

== Traffic growth ==
Year	Cargo (million tonnes)	Cars exported
2000–01	41.22	5,260
2001–02	36.12	4,635
2002–03	33.69	8,482
2003–04	36.71	39,874
2004–05	43.80	83,121
2005–06	47.25	102,692
2006–07	53.41	114,756
2007–08	57.15	137,971
2008–09	57.49	248,697
2009–10	61.06	273,917
2010–11	61.46	234,762
2011–12	55.71	252,640
2012–13	53.40	272,345
2015–16	50.06	
2016–17	50.21	
2017–18	51.88	
2018–19	53.01	
2019-20	46.76	
2020-21	43.55	
2021-22	48.56	

From 1881 to 1945, the cargo handled in Madras port varied from 0.5 million tonnes to 1 million tonnes. By 1979–80, the traffic touched 10 million tonnes and increased to 15 million tonnes in 1984–85. By 1991–92, the volume was 25 million tonnes, touching 41 million tonnes in 2000–01. Though there was a slump in the next three years, mainly due to the transfer of about 9 million tonnes of thermal coal to the Ennore Port, the port recovered to handle 47.25 million tonnes in 2005–06. In 2009–10, the port handled 61.06 million tonnes of cargo against 57.49 million tonnes in 2008–09 marking an increase of 6.20 percent and has set a target to handle 75 million tonnes in 2011–12 and 100 million tonnes in 2015–16. In 2010–11, the port handled 61.46 million tonnes, a 0.66 percent increase over the previous fiscal. The target set for the port for 2010–11 is 65.51 million tonnes against a target of 64.00 million tonnes during the previous fiscal. The terminal's throughput has increased from around 829,000 TEUs in 2006 to around 1.19 million TEUs in 2008. Crane productivity has been improved from 22 moves per hour per quay crane in 2006 to over 27 in 2009. The port annually handles nearly 20 million tonnes of both coal (8 million tonnes) and iron ore (12 million tonnes).

During 2009–10, the container traffic from the first terminal reached 1.216 million TEUs against 1.14 million TEUs in the previous fiscal. In 2010–11, this increased to 1.523 million TEUs, a 25 percent growth over the previous year. The second terminal handled over 300,000 TEUs during the calendar year 2010—up from 26,000 TEUs handled in the 3 months of operations since start up in 2009. The car exports from this port touched 273,917 units in 2009–10, 10.14 percent more than the previous year's 248,697 units, despite the recession.

The annual growth for container volumes handled by the Chennai port during the last 5 years till 2009–10 was 13 to 14 percent, while the average annual container growth in Indian ports is in the order of 8 percent. The growth increased to 25 percent during 2010–11, the largest growth rate among the top three container ports comprising JNPT, Chennai and Tuticorin. This is primarily due to capacity addition with the second terminal commencing operations coupled with new services starting to call the Chennai port.

The port currently has the capacity to handle 3,000,000 TEUs and with the commissioning of the third mega container terminal being planned, the capacity would go up to 8,000,000 TEUs.

Due to excessive pollution from coal dust, the port for a brief period of time suspended shipping food grain. However, following the transfer of coal shipments to the neighbouring Ennore Port since 2002, handling of food grain was resumed after about 9 years in 2003. The port hopes to handle 4 million tonnes of food grain annually over the next few years.

The following table lists the number of vessels handled in the past:

Commodity	2017–18	2018–19	2019–20	2020-21
Liquid bulk	478	478	430	385
Dry bulk	127	120	88	87
Break bulk	326	325	352	234
Containers	669	683	594	604
Total	1,600	1,606	1,464	1310

As of 2017, about 800 trailers entered the port on a daily basis.

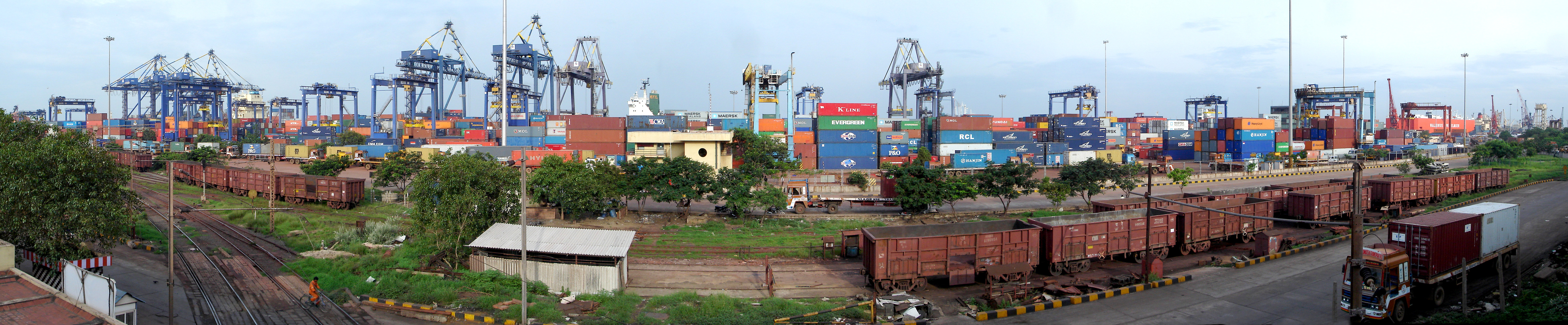
A panoramic view of the container terminal at the port

== Port layout and infrastructure ==
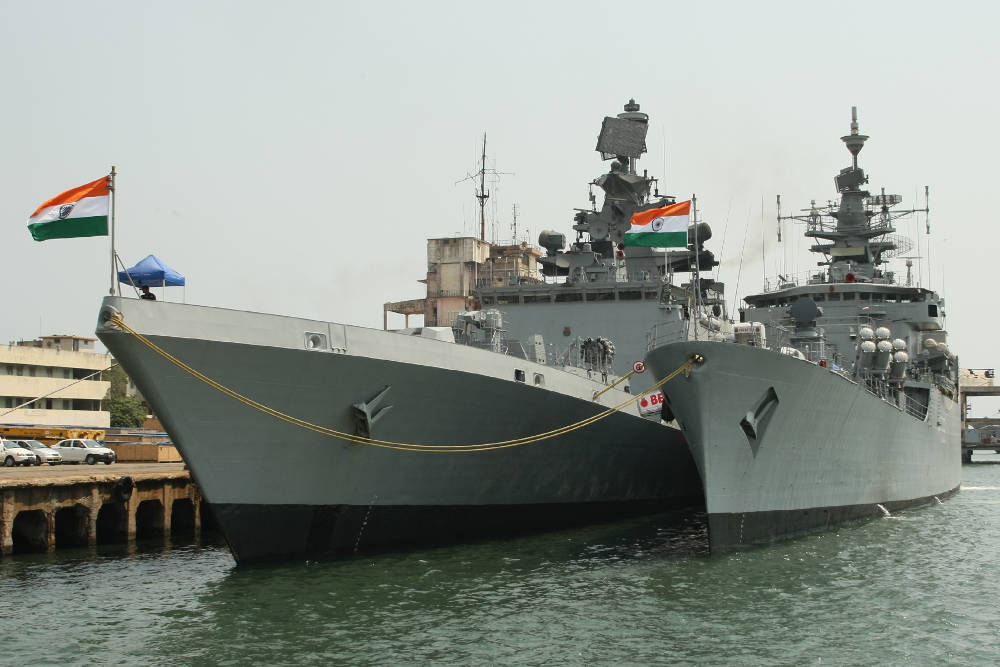
INS Shivalik and INS Betwa docked at the port in 2015

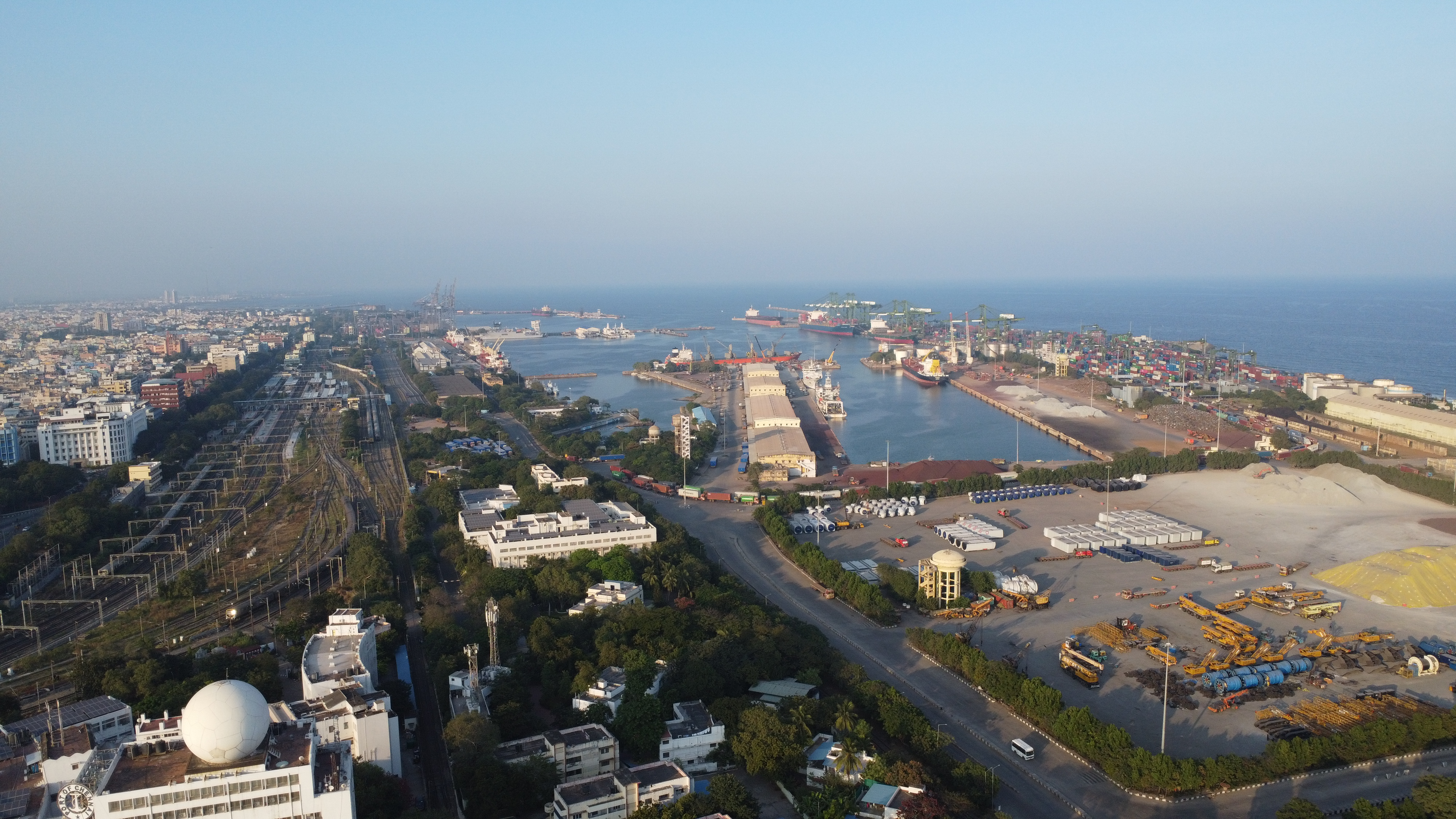
Chennai Port aerial view

Chennai port is the second smallest in the country measured by surface area, encompassing only 274 hectares. Chennai port area is divided into north, central and south zones and fishing harbours. The port has 26 alongside berths, including 21 deep-drafted berths and 2 oil jetties, in the 3 docks, viz., Dr. Ambedkar Dock, Satabt Jawahar Dock, and Bharathi Dock along with the container terminal, and draft ranging from 12–16.5 m (39–54 ft). Dr. Ambedkar Dock has 12 berths, Jawahar Dock has 6 berths, Bharathi Dock has 3 berths (for oil and iron ore), the container terminal has 3 berths and the moorings has 1 berth. The berths can handle containers as well as liquid and dry bulk and breakbulk cargoes. The approach channel to the port is 6,700 m (22,000 ft) long, and the turning basin is 560 m (1,840 ft) in length. A total of 9 channels marks buoys for the approach channel.

Region	Water spread	Land area	No. of berths
Inner harbour	218 acres	413 acres	16
Outer harbour	200 acres	100 acres	7
Total	418 acres	513 acres	23

The Jawahar Dock has six berths with a total length of 1,310 m (4,300 ft) and maximum permissible draft of 10.4 m (34 ft) and 11 m (36 ft). All berths are 218.3 m (716 ft), and half of them have maximum draft of 10.4 m (34 ft). The dock mainly handles coal, fertiliser, iron ore lumps, pellets, edible oil, and phosperic acid. The Dr. Ambedkar Dock has 13 berths with a total length of 1,676 m (5,499 ft) and maximum permissible drafts from 8.5–12 m (28–39 ft). The longest berth is 246 m (807 ft) long with maximum draft of 9.5 m (31 ft). Berth No. 7 is 198 m (650 ft) long with maximum draft of 8.5 m (28 ft), whereas Berths 8, through 12 are each 170.6 m (560 ft) and have maximum draft of 11 m (36 ft). Berth 14 is 179 m (587 ft) long with maximum draft of 9.5 m (31 ft). Berths 18 and 19 are naval berths. The dock has car and cruise terminals and chiefly handles general cargo, cars, granite steel, and food grains. The Bharathi Dock contains three berths with total quay length of 917.2 m (3,009 ft), with berths ranging from 274.3 m (900 ft) in length with maximum permissible draft of 16.5 to 338.9 m (54 to 1,112 ft) in length with maximum draft of 14.6 m (48 ft). The dock has three terminals, namely, container terminal, iron ore terminal, and oil terminal. It mainly handles containers, iron ore, and POL (petroleum, oil and lubricants).

Dock/Terminal	No.	Name of berth	Type	Length (m)	Permissible draft (m)	Remarks
Jawahar Dock	1	JD-1	general/Project Cargo	218.33	11.50	12.0 m on HW subject to the vessel reducing the draft to permissible draft of the berth below low tide. Transit shed attached
	2	JD-3	Project Cargo/general	218.33	11.50	Transit shed attached
	3	JD-5	Project Cargo/general	218.33	11.50	Transit shed attached
	4	JD-2	general/other liquid bulk	218.33	11.50	
	5	JD-4	general/other liquid bulk	218.33	11.00	
	6	JD-6	No operations/berthing vessel	218.33	11.00	
Dr. Ambedkar Dock	7	NQ	Passenger/general/other liquid bulk	198.00	8.50	
	8	WQ-1	General/other liquid bulk	170.60	11.00	
	9	WQ-2	General/RO-RO operations	170.60	12.00	
	10	CB	General	170.60	12.00	Transit shed attached
	11	WQ-3	General	170.60	12.00	
	12	WQ-4	Fertilizer/general	170.60	11.00	11 m up to 795 m; 9.5 m up to 810 m
	13	SQ-1	Fertilizer/general	246.00	9.50	
	14	SQ-2	Fertilizer/general/other liquid bulk	179.00	9.50	
	15	2nd CT-1		–	12.0	
	16	2nd CT-2		–	12.0	
	17	2nd CT-3		–	12.0	
	18	Naval Berth North		60.00	09.00	
	19	Naval Berth South		140.00	12.00	
Bharathi Dock (oil & iron ore)	20	BD-1	Oil	338.94	14.0	
	21	BD-3	Oil	304.00	16.50	17.0 m during HW; Between extreme dolphins
	22	BD-2	Iron ore	274.32	16.50	
Container Terminal	23	CT-1	Containers	200.00	13.40	Container freight station
	24	CT-2	Containers	200.00	13.40	Container freight station
	25	CT-3	Containers	200.00	13.40	
	26	CT-4	Containers	285.00	13.40	
Approach Channel		Zone I		750.00		
		Zone II to Zone VII		5950.00		
		Turning Circle		560.00		

The oil terminals at the port's Bharathi Dock (BD1 and BD3) can accommodate tankers to 100,000 dead weight tonnage (DWT), and a third berth can handle tankers up to 280.4 m (920 ft) and 140,000 DWT. Berth BD1 can accommodate ships to 108.1 m (355 ft) long. The oil terminals have capacity to handle 12 million tons of cargo per year and to pump 3,000 tons of crude oil and 1,000 tons of petroleum products per hour. Each berth is equipped with five marine loading arms, and the berths have pipelines to convey crude oil, white oil, and furnace oil.

The port handles Suezmax oil tankers (mid-sized cargo vessels) of up to a draft of 17 m at BD3 during day light, high tide as the per the present navigational practice and also during night hours subject to fulfilment of safety considerations on a ship-to-ship basis. As of 2018, the port can handle tankers with a capacity of 150,000 dead weight tonnage (DWT).

The iron ore terminal, which can handle 6 million tons per year and can load iron ore at a rate of 6,000 tons per hour, is also located at the Bharathi Dock. Berth BD2 can accommodate ore carriers up to 280.4 m (920 ft) in length. The terminal's separate receiving and shipping lines can function as an interconnected system. The terminal is served by rail lines and includes an ore stock yard with capacity for 544,000 metric tons.

The container terminal has four berths with a total quay length of 885 m (2,904 ft) and maximum permissible draft of 13.4 m (44 ft). With capacity to handle fifth-generation container vessels, three of the four berths are 200 m (660 ft) long, and one is 285 m (935 ft) long. The berths are served by seven quay cranes, including five super-post-Panamax and two post-Panamax cranes, and 24 gantry cranes. Operated by Chennai Container Terminal Private Limited, the container terminal has capacity for 950,000 TEUs. The container yard has 3,960 ground slots and 240 reefer plug points. The terminal contains 24 container freight stations with warehouse storage and offers 24-hr customs inspection and clearance facilities. The container terminal has direct services to Europe, China, the United States, Korea, Thailand, the Mediterranean region, and West Africa.

The warehousing and storage capacity available at the port is as follows:

Type	Nos.	Area (sq.m)
Covered		
Warehouses	12	65,686
Transit sheds	8	36,000
Covered area for FCI	6	43,450
Container freight stations	2	12,600
Open		
Open space		325,000
Container parking area		130,000

The port handles a variety of cargo including iron ore, coal, granite, fertilisers, petroleum products, containers, automobiles and several other types of general cargo items. Due to the increase in container traffic, a second container terminal was planned and tender works given to PSA Sical. It has asked for support for a mega container terminal. The terminal would be the first deep-water terminal of its kind in India and would be able to handle ultra-large container ships of 13,000–15,000 TEUs capacity and length exceeding 400 m (1,300 ft). The management of the container terminal was taken over by P&O Ports of Australia. This has a volume growth of 20 percent per year and has 59 percent of the market share of South India. It has services to Singapore, Malaysia, Thailand, Myanmar, Sri Lanka, Korea, China, Mediterranean, Europe, Australia and the United States.

The port has a current depth of 17 m (56 ft) and is capable of handling fourth-generation vessels up to 150,000 DWT. It is going through an expansion and will have a depth of 18–22 m (59–72 ft), a continuous quay length of 2 km (1.2 mi) and back-up area of around 100 ha (250 acres). Two new breakwaters for a total length of 4 km (2.5 mi) will be constructed – one as extension of the existing outer arm and the other extending from the fishing harbour breakwater. The consequent silting will reclaim about 300 ha (740 acres) of land. The mega terminal will be built on a 100-hectare (250-acre) portion of this land. The terminal will have a continuous quay length of 2 km (1.2 mi) with 18–22 m (59–72 ft) side along draft, capable of handling ultra-large container ships carrying over 15,000 TEUs. This will help it handle the latest generation vessels. Though the port is largely a container port, it has strategic importance as 3 service berths are allotted to the Indian Navy.

The approach channel to the port has two sections—the entrance channel within the protection of outer arm and the outer channel beyond the protection of outer arm. The total length of the entrance channel is 7 km. The width of channel gradually increased from 244 m to 419 m at the bent portion, then maintains a constant width of 305 m. The depth of the inner and the outer channels are 18.6 m and 19.2 m, respectively, below chart datum, with a swell allowances of 3 m. The entrance is 350 m in Bharathi Dock and 125 m in Dr. Ambedkar Dock. The draught in the navigational channel is maintained by dredging approximately 1 million cubic metres annually.

== Terminals ==
=== Container terminals ===
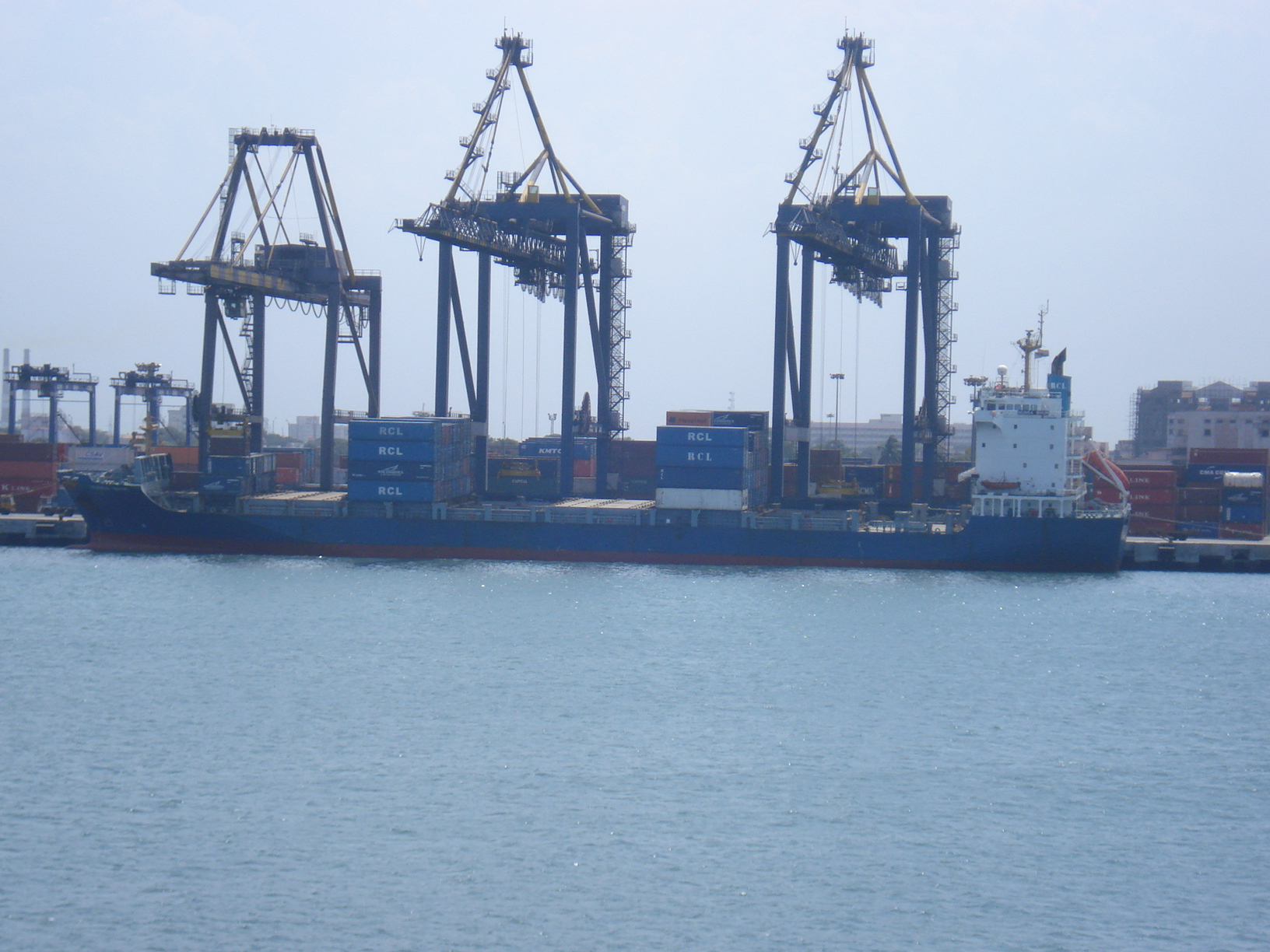
A terminal at the Chennai Port

The port has two container terminals, run separately by DP World Pvt. Ltd and Singapore's PSA International Pte Ltd, with a combined capacity to handle 2.8 million standard containers a year. The two terminals loaded 1.11 million standard containers between April and December 2010, up from 886,000 containers a year earlier. Both the terminals have daily trains to Inland Container Depots (ICDs). There are plans to build a mega container terminal, the third one at the port, with private funds worth ₹ 36,860 million. The port is served by various container liner services, namely, APL, K Line, Maersk Line, MOL, NYK, PIL and several regional container lines.

Chennai Container Terminal

Chennai Container Terminal (CCT) is the first container terminal in Chennai port built in 1983. The container terminal was privatised in 2001 and is operated by DP World since 30 November 2001 with a capacity of 1.2 million TEUs. CCT is managed under a 30-year build-operate-transfer agreement set up with the Chennai Port Trust of the Government of India. The terminal is capable of handling fifth-generation vessels up to 6,400 TEU and has direct services to China, West Africa, Europe and the United States. The terminal crossed the "one million TEU" mark in 2007. In 2011, it handled 1.12 million TEUs. It has a quay length of 885 m (2,904 ft) and has 4 berths with an alongside depth of 13.4 m (44 ft), height (ISLW to Top of Cope) of 34 m (112 ft), channel length of 6,700 m (22,000 ft) and channel depth of 19.2 m (63 ft). The total terminal area covers 21.1 hectares, and yard stacking area covers 17 hectares (42 acres). The terminal has an on-site rail track. It has a berth productivity of 22 moves per hour and an average turnaround of 26 hours. The operator has invested around US$128 million to get new equipment at the terminal. At present, 7 quay cranes with Super Post Panamax handling capacity and 24 rubber-tyred gantry cranes (RTGs) form part of the inventory. The operator has also taken over from Chennai Port 4 quay cranes, 10 RTGs, 3 reach stackers, 240 reefer plugs, and 2 top lifters and one empty container handler. CCT is ranked at the 79th position among the top 100 container terminals in the world. It is one of the fastest growing terminals in India with a CAGR of 20 percent. It presently has four mainline services with direct connectivity to Mediterranean, Europe, Thailand, Vietnam, China and Korea. The mainline services are complemented by seven weekly feeder services and one coastal service to Colombo, Vizag, Penang, Port Klang, Singapore, Yangon and Port Blair, respectively. Presently, CCT is connected to 50+ ports worldwide. A container freight station, with a covered area of 6,500 m^{2} (70,000 sq ft), operates within the port offering such services as inspection, LCL de-stuffing and delivery of import cargo. CCT has plans to invest ₹ 1 billion to install two quay cranes.

Chennai International Terminal

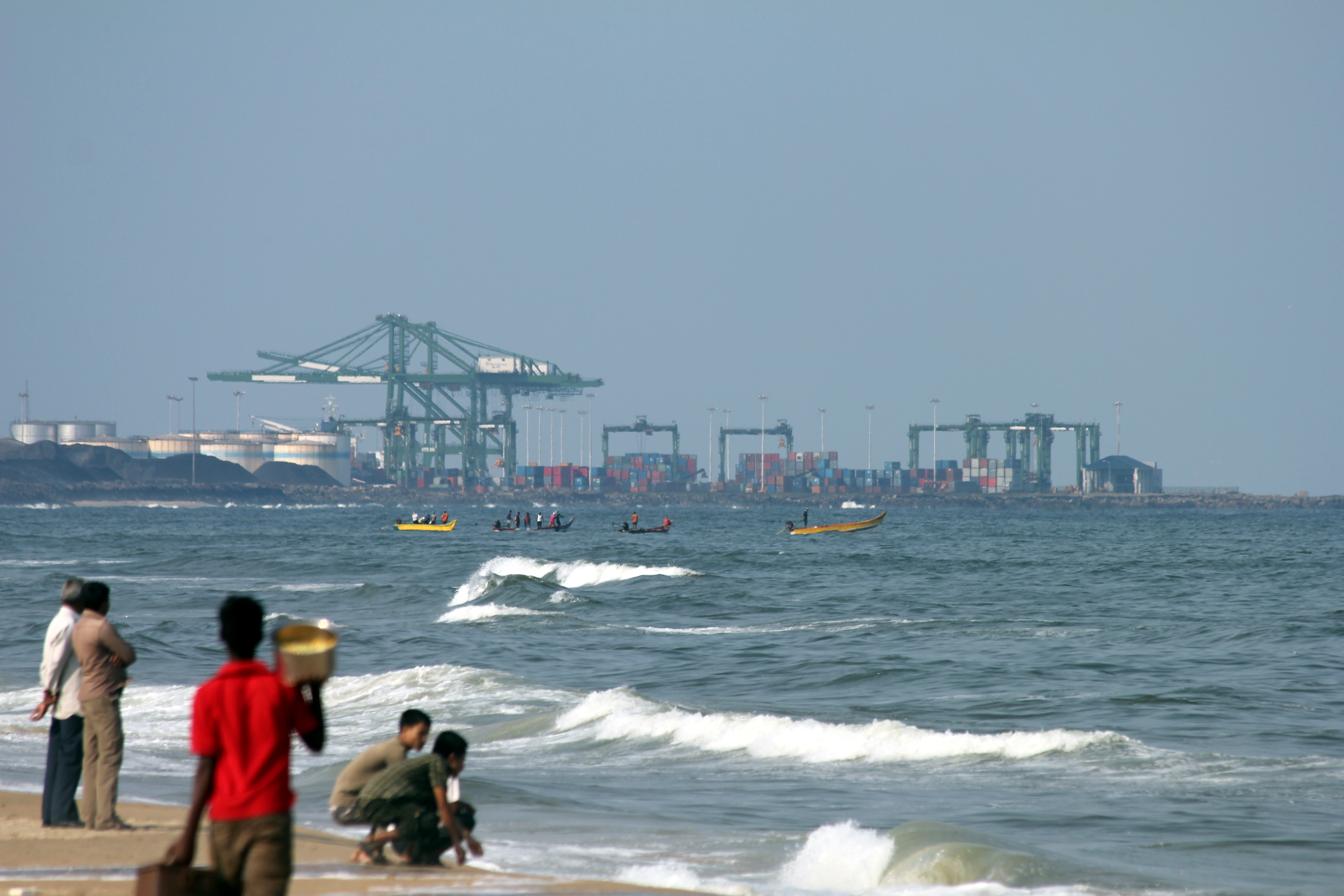
Chennai International Container Terminal view from the Marina Beach

Chennai International Terminal Pvt Ltd (CITPL) is the second container terminal that started operations from 22 June 2009 with berths SCB1, SCB2 and SCB3. The build-operate-transfer facility, built at a cost of about US$110 million, is a joint venture between PSA International and Chennai-based Sical Logistics Ltd. With 35 ha (86 acres) of yard space and three berths with a total quay length of 832 m (2,730 ft), the terminal offers an annual capacity of 1.5 million TEUs. With the addition of 4 post-Panamax quay cranes, capable of lifting two 20-ft containers per move, and 8 RTGs, it now has 7 rail-mounted quay crane (RMQC), 18 RTGs, 6 reach stacker and 120 reefer plugs. Once fully commissioned, CITPL would be able to accommodate 8,000-TEU vessels with drafts up to 15.5 m (51 ft).

=== Ro-ro car terminal ===
Often called the Detroit of Asia, Chennai is base to several international car makers, namely, Ford Motor Co., Hyundai Motor Co., Nissan Motor Co., Renault SA, Daimler AG and BMW AG. Car export (mainly Hyundai) increased by 80.25 percent to touch 248,697 during 2008–09 as against 137,971 in the previous year. The port handled 65 car carriers compared with 40 in the previous year. In 2009, the port shipped nearly 274,000 cars, 10 percent more than the previous year. The port is now the number one ro-ro car terminal in the country. After Hyundai, the port have started attracting global manufacturers like Mahindra, Toyota, and Ford. Ford has decided to move exports to Chennai Port by 2010.

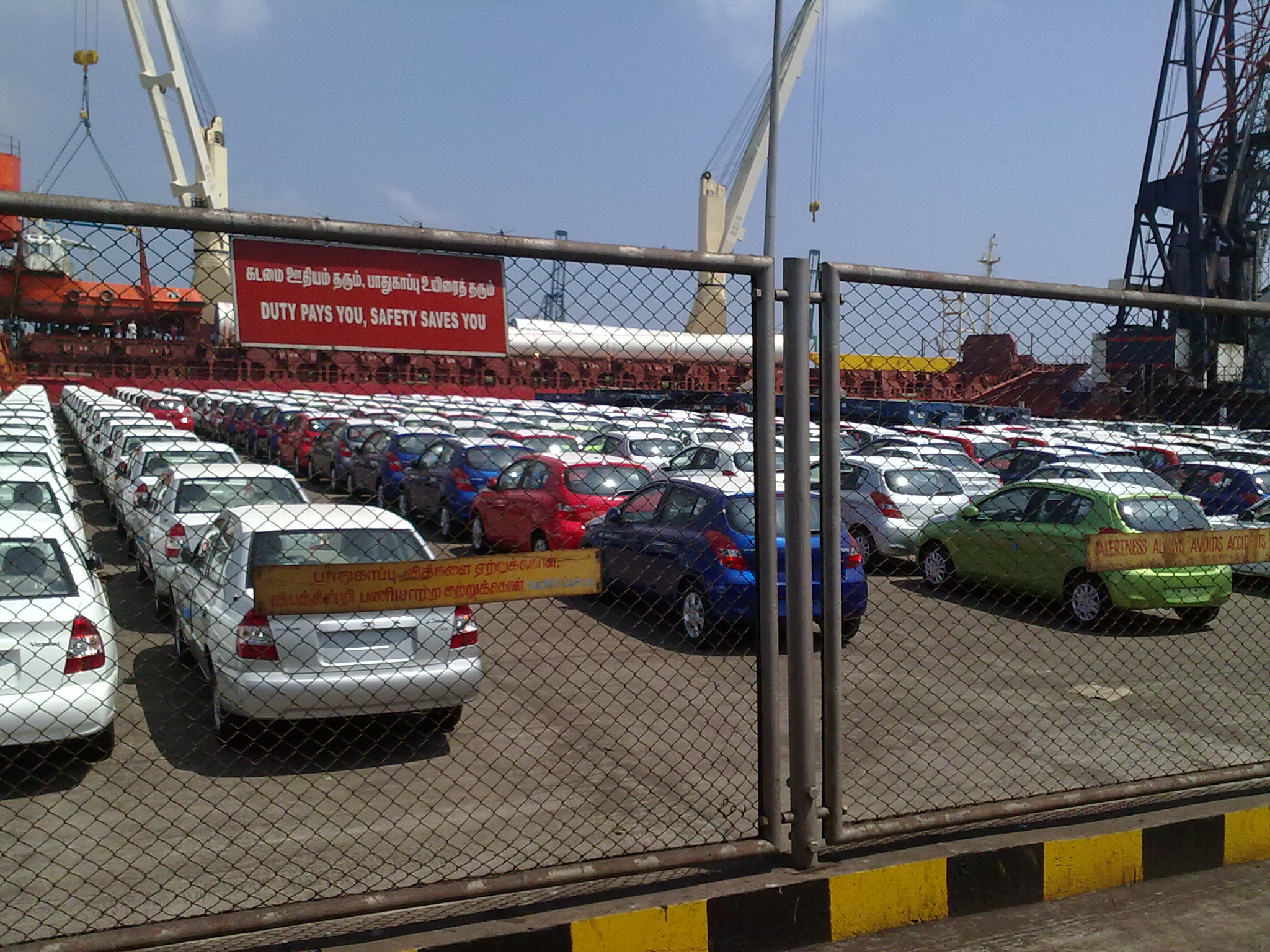
Hyundai cars lined up for shipment at the Chennai Port

Hyundai Motor India is coming up with a first-of-its-kind dedicated automobile terminal at the Chennai port. The Chennai port facility is expected to be on the lines of its Ulsan Port, from where it exports half of Korea's 1,500,000 vehicles annually. The export terminal at the Chennai port would cater to its total export target of 300,000 cars, which would be 50 percent of its total production by 2009–10. The company has plans to develop the land into a dedicated terminal to serve as an export base. It is believed that the terminal would basically cater to its export of compact cars from India. The new terminal, coming up at the southern end of the container terminal, would be spread over 10,000 m^{2} (110,000 sq ft) of land and includes a 300 m long, 30 m wide, and 12 m deep ro-ro berth. It would have two six-storey multi-level dedicated parking yard for 6,000 cars each, estimated at a cost of ₹ 400 million, where one ship load of cars can be stacked. The terminal, being developed at a cost of ₹ 800 million, would cater to other car exporters also and is expected to be completed by the end of 2012.

By 2017, the port handled less than 150,000 cars, chiefly by Hyundai, with Nissan and Ford moving out to the neighbouring Ennore Port.

=== Cruise terminal ===
Chennai Port is the only port on the East Coast of India with a cruise terminal. Chennai Port is one of the five major ports in the country that have been identified by the Ministry of Shipping for development of cruise terminals, the other four being Goa, Kochi, Mumbai and Mangaluru. As of 2018, the port receives an average of 4 to 5 cruise ships annually. The port has had passenger and tourist services to Burma, Malaya, Singapore, Manila, London, Suez, Aden and Colombo for over 100 years. There was regular passenger traffic during the British rule. Per official records, the port had an annual passenger traffic of 60,000 in 1956. In 1959, the port built a dedicated passenger terminal for coastal and cruise vessels. The passenger cruise terminal is located in the West Quay. The Shipping Corporation of India operated regular Chennai–Singapore services till 1984. On an average, 10 international cruise vessels dock in the port each year. The number of tourists visiting the port in 2008–09 was 2,616, which rose to 3,401 in 2009–10. The country's first cruise ship, AMET Majesty, is registered in Chennai and started operations from Chennai on 8 June 2011.

The modernised cruise terminal at the port was inaugurated on 12 October 2018 at a cost of ₹ 172.4 million. Spread over 2,880 square meters with ground, mezzanine, and first floors, the terminal has 10 immigration counters, with plans to increasing it to 20. It is equipped with four escalators and a cafeteria on the mezzanine floor. It has a capacity to seat 168 passengers on the first floor and 132 on the ground floor, with three-seater airport chairs. The building is powered by a 250-kw solar power panel provided at the rooftop.

== Operations ==
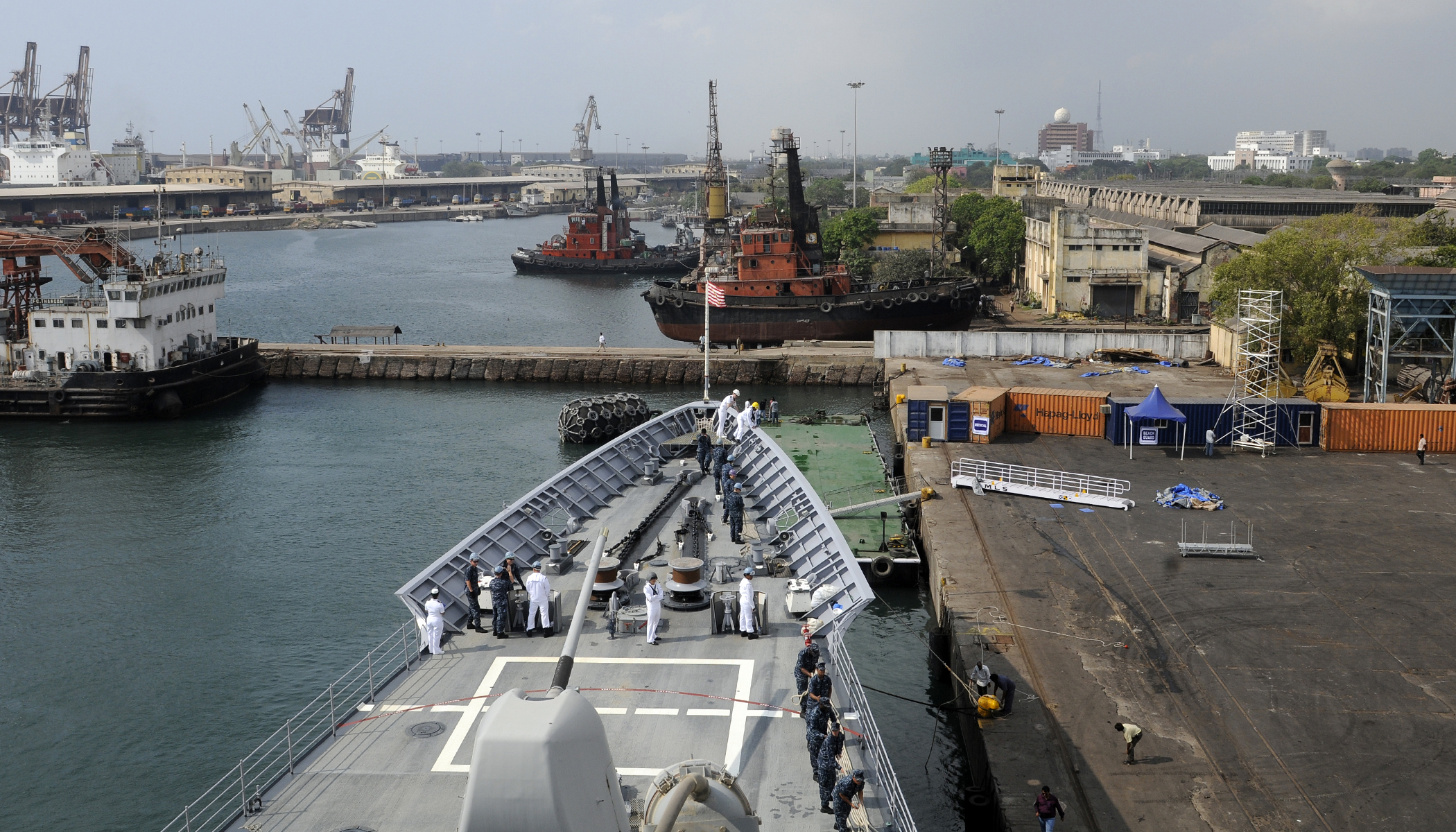
USS Bunker Hill is moored pier side at Chennai Port

Cargo-Handling Equipments	Total Units
Locos (diesel) Chittaranjan	8
BHEL loco	10
Diesel/electric loco	2
Mobile cranes	12
Fork lift trucks	55
Floating crane	1
Electrical forklift trucks	24
Pay loaders	7
Shore electric cranes	25
Transfer cranes	10
Tractor head	34
Container quay cranes (35.5T/40T capacity)	4
Toplift trucks (25T and 35T capacity)	5
Trailers	32
Crawler-mounted cranes	3
Empty container handler	1
Reach stackers	3
10T/3T FLT	7

The port handles around 8 million tonnes of coal for clients such as the Andhra Pradesh State Electricity Board, Karnataka Power Corporation, cement plants of Tamil Nadu and independent power producers in northern Tamil Nadu and southern Andhra Pradesh. The coal handling for the Tamil Nadu Electricity Board was transferred to the Ennore Port. In 2005, as part of pollution-control measure, the port has installed wind curtains made of ultraviolet resistant fabric along the harbour's beachfront for over 1.5 km to the east of the coal terminal to prevent wind carrying coal dust into the city at a cost of ₹ 3.7 million. In 2008, the port has also installed a semi-mechanised closed coal conveyor system comprising two streams with a capacity of 15 million metric tons/annum and a handling rated capacity of 1,500 metric tons/hour/stream and running for a length of 5 km at two berths, namely, Jawahar Dock IV and VI, at a cost of ₹ 430 million to transfer the coal to the individual coal plots at the southern end of the port, from where the cargo will be transported by rail to respective destinations, thus preventing pollution from coal dust and eliminating movement of coal-carrying trucks within the port. The conveyor runs at an elevation of 10–13 m and has provision for longitudinal movement along the road to the plots and transverse movement for stacking coal at individual plots. Coal discharged into the hoppers located at the two docks is conveyed to coal plots through conveyors or tripper cars and is equipped with belt weigher. The conveyor system is expected to remain functional for about 5 years, till Ennore Port is ready to handle coal for all the clients.

Bunkering at the port is currently carried out through the barge jetty in the extreme northern end of the Bharathi Dock. This is a 30 m temporary facility with a draft of 2.5 to 3.0 m. This jetty is used exclusively by Indian Oil Corporation for bunkering of Navy, Coast Guard, bulk carriers and container ships—both coastal and foreign ships. However, the demand for bunker has outpaced the supply of infrastructure needed for bunkering in recent years.

In 2007, a fully automated, round-the-clock helpline for providing information on the ships berthed and waiting, the scale of rates and facilities available at the port, the first of its kind in the country, was established. In the same year, the Indian government agreed to lift restrictions on concessionary Sri Lankan tea and apparel exports at the port.

On 11 May 2011, the Madras High Court directed the Shipping Secretary that only clean cargo such as containers and cars be allotted to the port for handling from 1 October 2011. All dusty cargo such as coal and iron ore will be allotted to the Ennore Port.

The port is one of the six ports in India through which drugs are permitted to be imported, which is handled by the Central Drugs Standard Control Organisation (CDSCO), the other ports being Kolkata, Mumbai, Nhava Sheva, Kochi and Kandla ports.

As of 2011, cargo movement to the port is increasing by 21 percent. Over 5,000 container trucks move through the port every day. However, the number of containers coming into the port has dropped by 30 percent in the same year.

In July 2012, a vessel traffic management system was installed at the port to track vessel movements for nearly 2 km, which can be extended to 48 nautical miles.

As of 2012, the port consumed 38 MW of power every year, spending about ₹ 290 million per annum on electricity charges.

In November 2019, a ₹ 540-million paved storage area for handling export cargoes was opened covering 11.32 hectares. A coastal berth covering 260 meters was also opened at a cost of ₹ 800 million.

== Auxiliary functions ==
=== Meteorological functions ===
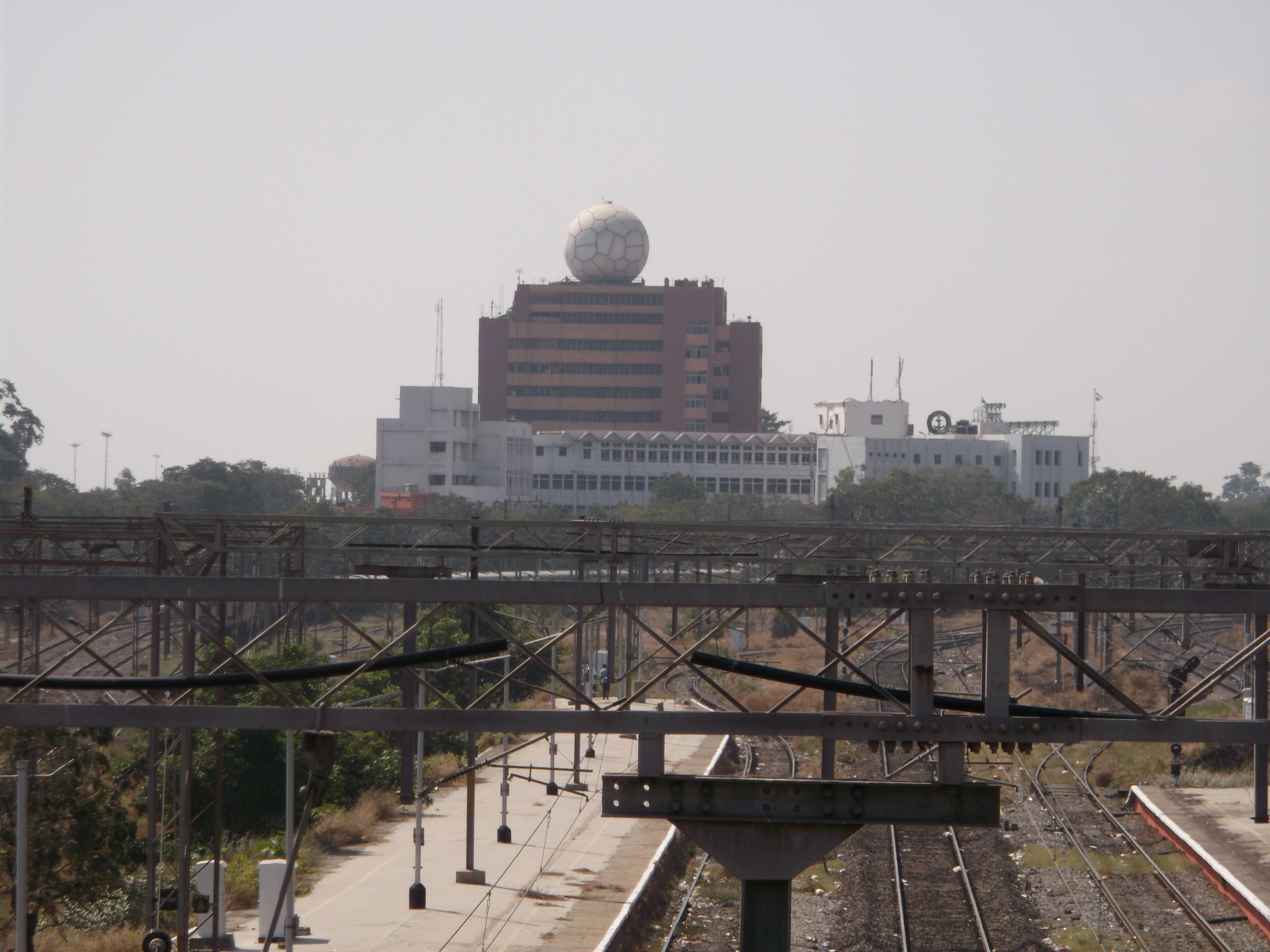
Centenary Building, the Port's administrative building

The cyclone detection radar station of the Southern Regional Meteorological Centre is located at the Centenary Building, the administrative building of the port. It is located atop the building at a height of about 53 m above sea level in a dome weighing 18 tonnes. The radar scans the atmosphere within a radius of 500 km. The Port Meteorological Office also functions from the same building.

The India Meteorological Department (IMD) maintains Voluntary Observing Fleet (VOF) through the Port Meteorological Office comprising ships of Merchant Navy, Indian Navy and foreign agencies through which meteorological observations from the ocean area are collected on real-time basis for operational forecasting and climatological purpose.

=== Disease control ===
The Port Health Organisation, Chennai, functioning under the Director General of Health Services, Ministry of Health and Family Welfare, Government of India, was established in 1946 with an objective of preventing entry of yellow fever and other quarantinable and communicable diseases from abroad. Mosquito control in the port area is being undertaken by two agencies, namely, the Chennai Port Trust and the Port Health Organisation. Anti-mosquito measures are undertaken by the Port Trust while the issuance of yellow fever certificates, ship deratting and overall supervision of mosquito control is undertaken by the Port Health Organisation.

== Connectivity ==
=== Extra-port connectivity ===
The foundation stone for the ₹ 6,000-million Chennai Port-Ennore road connectivity project was laid in January 2011. The Ennore Manali Road Improvement Project (EMRIP) is expected to be completed in 2 years. Of the total cost of ₹ 6,000 million, ₹ 2,500 million would be contributed each by the National Highways Authority of India and the Chennai Port Trust while ₹ 582 million would come from the Tamil Nadu government and rest by Ennore Port Ltd. EMRIP, which was conceived in 1998, has been under implementation for the past 10 years. The project envisages improvement of a 30.1-kilometre (18.7 mi) road network in north Chennai that connects all the container freight station handling containers for Chennai port. This includes 6 km (3.7 mi) of Ennore Expressway, 9 km (5.6 mi) of Thiruvotriyur–Ponneri–Pancheti Road, 5.4 km (3.4 mi) of Manali Oil Refinery Road, 8.1 km (5.0 mi) of the northern segment of Inner Ring Road, and 1.6 km (0.99 mi) of Chennai Port Trust Fishing Harbour Road, in addition to shore protection measures comprising 13 groins along the Ennore coast. The original cost of the project was ₹ 1,500 million but was revised due to addition of service road to the four lanes of Thiruvotriyur–Ponneri–Pancheti road, provision of underpass on Ennore Expressway Road and drainage on Manali Oil Refinery Road besides escalation of cost during the intervening period. The project completion is expected by June 2013.

An 18.3-kilometre (11.4 mi) long, 20-metre (66 ft) wide elevated road project connecting the port with Maduravoyal is under construction at a cost of ₹ 16,550 million. Upon completion, this will be the country's longest four-way elevated expressway. The project was sanctioned in June 2007, and the foundation stone was laid in January 2009. The expressway starts from Gate No. 10 of the Chennai Port near the War Memorial and ends before Maduravoyal Interchange. It would run along the banks of the Cooum up to Koyambedu and would end along the Cooum near the Koyambedu grade separator. From there for a distance of three km up to Maduravoyal the elevated expressway would come up on Poonamallee High Road. There would be a total of four entry and exit ramps as part of the project. While the entry ramps would come up on Sivananda Salai and College Road, the exit points would be provided on Spurtank Road and Kamaraj Salai. The work at the Maduravoyal end began in December 2010. The project was initially expected to be completed by end of 2013. However, the project had been put on hold for years. In February 2014, the Madras High Court quashed the stop-work order of the state PWD and ordered the completion of the project.

=== Intra-port connectivity ===
The total port roads run to a length of 27.5 km with a minimum width of 6 m and a maximum width of 26 m.

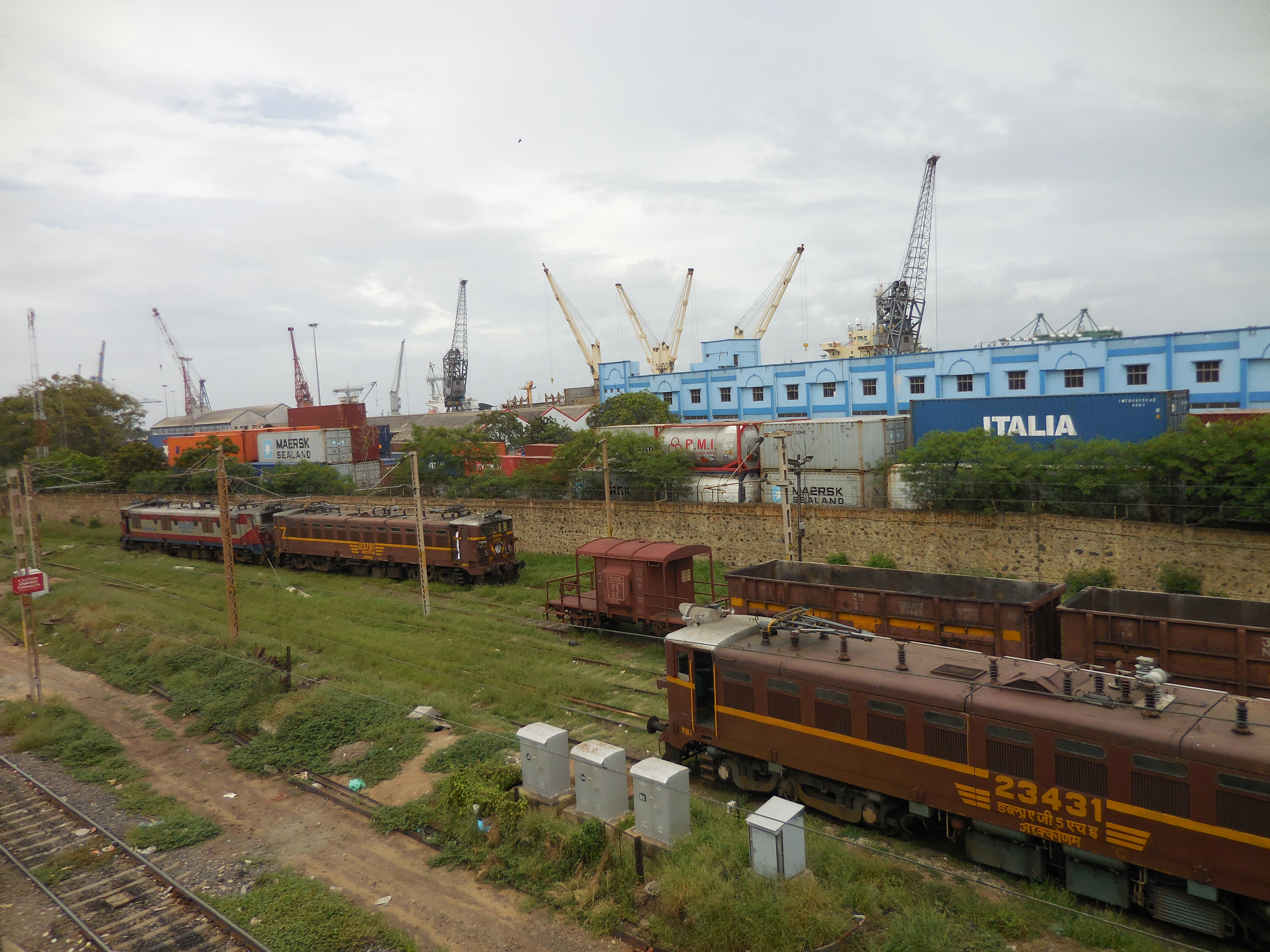
Lines at Chennai Beach railway station serving the Chennai Port. The port is visible at the background.

The port is served by the Chennai Beach railway terminus in the Chennai Suburban Railway Network of the Southern Railway, chiefly handling suburban trains on the Chennai Beach-Tambaram section of the Chennai Suburban Railway Network. The port is one among the major ports having terminal shunting yard and running its own railway operations inside the harbour. There are two lines at the port. The port has broad gauge railway lines running up to 68.8 km (42.8 mi) and handled 25 percent of the total volume of the cargo, 4,360 rakes (239,412 wagons) during 2009–10.

As part of the port development, internal railway lines are being augmented for the evacuation of containers from the port. Third and fourth railway lines are being developed by the Southern Railway to improve connectivity to the port and the rail share of container movement to 30 percent from the current 7 percent. The rest will be moved by road.

Per the 2004 statistics, 11 percent of the containers arrived by train and the rest by road.

Every month, nearly 150,000 container-laden vehicles (both import and export) transit through the port's only available gate (Zero Gate) at Royapuram, north of the port.

=== Pipelines ===
Crude is transported from oil tankers berthed at the port through a pipeline and then by road or rail. Since 1969, the port is connected to the Chennai Petroleum Corporation's (CPCL) refinery in Manali via a 30-inch-diameter pipeline running for a length of 17 km. CPCL is planning to replace this with 42-inch-diameter pipeline at a cost of ₹ 1,260 million along the proposed Quadrilateral Road Network from Chennai Port to Ennore-Manali Highway. However, citing threats to habitation, the government has refused clearance to the project.

In September 2018, the port completed work on the 42-inch-diameter crude pipeline with a length of 17 km and a carrying capacity of around 5,000 KL per hour (against 2,600 KL of the old pipeline) at a cost of ₹ 2,500 million.

== Natural disasters ==
The Indian Ocean Tsunami of 26 December 2004, one of the deadliest in the recorded history, had a devastating effect all over the region and, of course, damaged the port's infrastructure, including cranes, wharfs, moorings and some part of the ship channel and hindered the operations of the port for a brief period. Some of the ships hit the wharves close to where they were berthed. Other damages at the port include collision of three ships while being towed to deep sea resulting in the loss of about 1,500 tonnes of sugar and damages to some of the cars that awaited export. The port suspended operations for two days. The total damage to property, infrastructure and equipment at the port due to the tsunami stood at ₹ 129.6 million. Rebuilding the entry channels and affected areas incurred another ₹ 100 million. The port suffered a loss of ₹ 30 million due to operational halt on 26 and 27 December 2004, during which around 250,000 tonnes of container could not be serviced, with trade of 15 vessels on sail and 10 vessels at berth affected. This was in addition to the loss due to waiving of marine charges owing to the disaster.

As a consequence of the tsunami, the port trust is planning to create an artificial beach from left of the Cooum river (next to the Napier bridge) right up to fishing harbour in North Chennai covering about 10 km to protect the port from seaside from similar natural calamities. The beach is planned within the port's territory before the east breakwater on the seaside and would not be accessible to the public. In addition, the port is also planning to reclaim the land adjacent to the Cooum during the Tenth Plan.

On the flip side, the disaster has made the port the deepest on the east coast. A bathymetry survey conducted by the National Institute of Ocean Technology (NIOT) to measure the depth of the sea has revealed the entry channel to the port has deepened enabling the berthing of vessels of deeper drafts. The high current generated by the tsunami waves dredged about 0.4 to 0.5 million cubic metres of sediments, which has deepened the 17.4 m-deep harbour by 1 to 2 m more, especially along the Dr. Ambedkar Dock and the Barathi Dock. Similarly, the depth of the entry channel, which was 18.6 m, has deepened by a metre.

== Lights and lighthouses ==
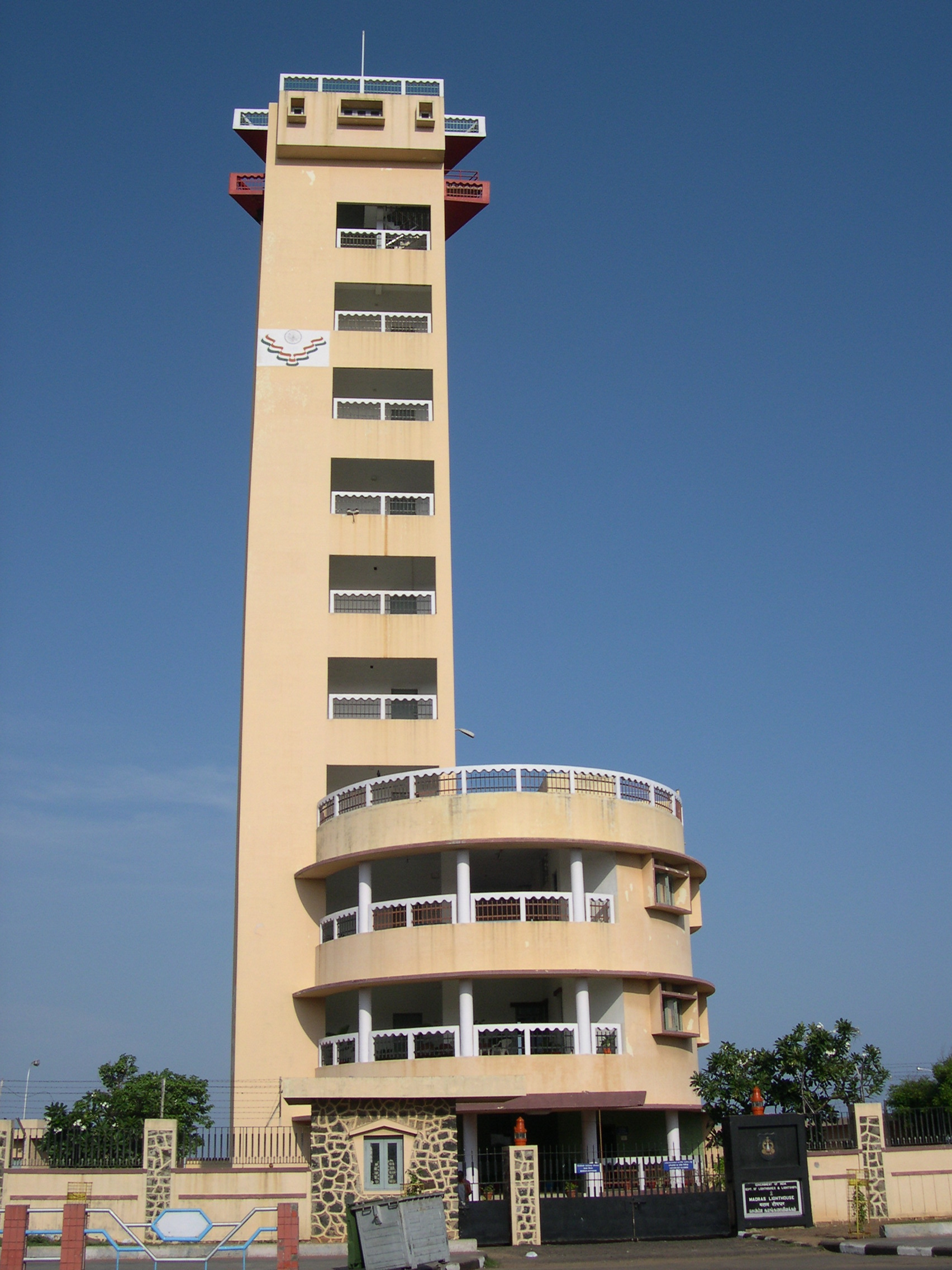
The present lighthouse in Chennai

There are both historic and modern lighthouses in and around the port, some of which have been decommissioned. The port is the location of one of Chennai's earliest lighthouses—the entrance channel tower. The 24 m (79 ft) tall tower with a focal plane of 26 m (85 ft), flashing white, red and green lights, is located north of the port. It is visible only from around the entrance channel. This tower is still active. However, the first lighthouse of the city is located just outside the port, in Fort St. George campus. It was active from 1796 till 1844. The second and third lighthouses are located in the Madras High Court campus near the port.

The present lighthouse is located about 6 km south of the port on the Marina Beach. It is a 46 m (151 ft) tall, 11-storied triangular cylindrical concrete tower with lantern and double gallery, attached to a 3-story circular harbour-control building, emitting light from a height of 57 m (187 ft) from the mean sea level. This lighthouse, which is active since 1977, is powered by a 440V, 50 Hz main supply.

== The future ==
A third box terminal has been approved by the Cabinet Committee on Infrastructure. This will require investment of US$800 million and will be offered as a build-operate-transfer project, as part of a 30-year concession. Construction will take seven years to complete and the deep-water container terminal will have a capacity of 4 million TEU. The mega container terminal project, expected to be the single largest terminal ever built in India, is to be developed north of existing Bharathi Dock with two new breakwaters (total length of 4.23 km (2.63 mi)), continuous quay length of 2 km (1.2 mi) with 22 m (72 ft) alongside depth (ultimate) and a basin area of 300 hectares and back up area of 100 hectares. The gigantic proportions will feature 2 km quay length in a straight line at the new outer harbour, with a 2.75 km extension of the existing outer arm breakwater and a new northern breakwater of 1.73 km emanating from the eastern breakwater of the fishing harbour. The project also involves converting waterfront into 225 acres of land. The other side of breakwater would be used by the port as a berth to handle oil vessels. The project will be the first deep-water terminal of its kind in India and can handle ultra-large container ships of capacity over 15,000 TEUs and length of 400 m (1,300 ft). Overall project completion is expected by 2018. In September 2011, Mundra Port and Special Economic Zone Ltd (MPSEZ) emerged as the sole and lowest bidder for constructing the mega terminal. Based on earlier projections, Chennai is expected to handle 5 million TEUs by 2017.

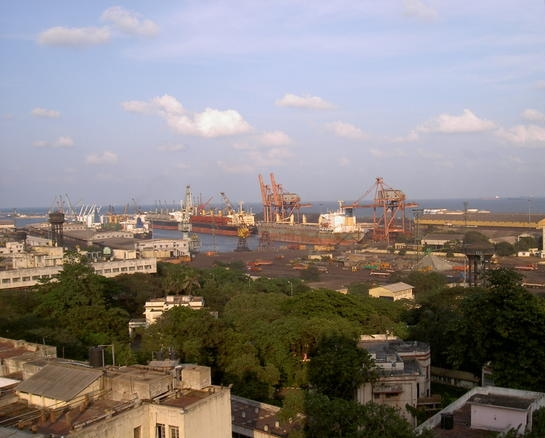
A portion of the port visible from the surrounding buildings

Chennai Port Trust has plans to build a marina along a 200-metre (660 ft) stretch in the west quay to berth a dozen yachts. The marina will provide lockers, separate berths and other facilities to these sailors, who come in small boats. The sailors can then proceed inland for sightseeing. However, the plan still remains on paper. Although the plan to build a large-scale marina is at the proposal stage, the port cannot have a marina till the coal yard is vacated. After coal handling is moved out, the port will reclaim land by constructing groynes—rigid hydraulic structures built from an ocean shore that interrupt water flow and limit the movement of sediment.

The Rajiv Gandhi dry port (container freight station) and multi-modal logistics hub near Sriperumbudur special economic zone (SEZ) is under development at an estimated cost of ₹ 3,800 million, including land cost of ₹ 1,001.6 million. Proposed components include ICD/off-dock CFS, container yard, rail and road connectivity to national rail and road network, trade centre, warehouses for containerised cargos like leather garments, textiles, automotive components and electronic hardware. A total of 125 acres of land at Mappedu in the Sriperumbudur SEZ allotted by SIPCOT of the Government of Tamil Nadu is being acquired for the project on a 99-year lease basis. The first-of-its-kind project is expected to be completed by 2014. The distance between Chennai Port and the dry port is about 50 km (31 mi). About 19 km (12 mi) would be covered by the elevated corridor, 16 km (9.9 mi) by National Highway 4 and balance by a single-line state highway that would be converted into two-lane soon. The dry port would consist of 75 acres (30 ha) of custom-bound area and 50 acres (20 ha) of non-custom bound area and would accommodate containers, hazardous and non-hazardous materials. A barge jetty-cum-liquid cargo terminal at an outlay of ₹ 250 million is also being proposed on PPP mode. This is one of the three container freight stations planned by Chennai Port Trust.

A barge handling facility at the Bharathi Dock is being developed at a cost of ₹ 250 million. The project is expected to be completed by 2013. The 200 m long barge jetty is being developed with a depth of 10 m and back area of 7,500 m. The jetty is proposed to be constructed between the iron ore berth and oil terminal so as to cater to barges and bunkers and similar vessels handling liquid cargo.

The port is planning to construct a parking facility on an 11-acre stretch in Thiruvottiyur for container trucks. The port is also investing ₹ 500 million to have more berths exclusively for bunkering.

The port has decided to have a 7.5 MW wind energy farm in Tirunelveli district at an outlay of ₹ 493.1 million.

To reduce congestion at the harbour, which has two bays (two each for entry and two for exit of containers), the port plans to modernise zero gate and open one more bay and widen the roads that lead to zero gate and to lay six to eight lanes from the zero gate to avoid stranding of vehicles.

In December 2011, as part of security measures, the Directorate of Logistics, Customs and Central Excise planned to get a fixed mega container scanner within the next few months at a location near the Zero Gate of the port at a cost of ₹ 600 million from a U.S.-based company.

The Chennai Port Trust plans to develop a barge handling facility inside the port at a cost of ₹ 260 million in Bharathi Dock through public-private partnership to meet the increase in demand for bunkering – fuel oil used aboard ships. The need for barge facility is also due to the increasing vessel movements and vessel size. The proposed length of the jetty will be three times the length of the present facility. The jetty could accommodate barges with carrying capacity of 1,000 tonne to 3,000 tonne. In addition to bunkering fuel and edible oil, other cargoes that are envisaged to be handled at the proposed facility include vegetable oil (crude and refined), furnace oil and molasses.

In September 2019, Prime Minister Narendra Modi signed a Memorandum of Intent for the Chennai–Vladivostok Maritime Corridor, a sea route covering approximately 5,600 nautical miles, or about 10,300 km, aimed at increasing bilateral trade between India and Russia.

== Records ==
On the night of 30 August 2018, vessel MT New Diamond, with 160,079 gross registered tonnage arrived at the port from the Basra oil terminal in Iraq, carrying 133,719 tonnes of light crude oil and was docked in the oil docks. This is the first time for an Indian port in an enclosed harbour to see berthing of a very large crude carrier (VLCC).

== Sister ports ==
The port has sister port agreements with the following ports to co-operate in maritime transportation and port development. This also covers technical expertise, cruise knowledge, container terminal and tourism between the sister ports.

Country	Port	State / Region	Since
Belgium	Port of Zeebrugge	West Flanders	November 2008
Canada	Port of Halifax	Nova Scotia	January 2009

== Notable employees ==
- Srinivasa Ramanujan, Indian mathematician (1912)

== See also ==
- Ennore Port
- Kattupalli Shipyard
- Ports in India
