= Masula boat =

Indian boat

Masula boat, also known as masulah boat, is a kind of non-rigid boat built without knees used on the coast of Madras (the present day city of Chennai), India, along with catamarans.

== Description ==
Locally known as padagu or salangu among the fisher folks, the masula boat is a large, flat-bottomed, high-sided, open boat with a clumsy design consisting of mango wood planks sewed together with strands of coir which cross over a wadding of the same material, but without frames or ribs, so that the shock due to surf is much reduced. It is specially designed for use where there are no harbours of refuge, chiefly upon the surf-beaten Coromandel Coast of India. It is used in shooting shore seines and also as a cargo lighter. Its range extends along the whole of the eastern coast of India northwards of Cape Calimere. The equivalent type of boats used on the west coast are the beach lighters. Masula boats are generally smaller, although they can be up to 9 m in length. The pattern varies across the coast, namely, padava on the Andhra coast and bar boat in Orissa coast. A variant found in the region between Kakinada and Machilipatnam has ribs inside.

The masula boats were mainly used by Europeans in the 19th century before the building of Chennai Port. The dimensions of the masula boat generally varies from 30 to 35 feet in length, 10 to 11 feet in breadth, and 7 to 8 feet in depth. On the Coromandel Coast, it is distinctly short, measuring as short as about 28 feet in length. In the northern region of the coast, chiefly in Godavari and Visakhapatnam districts of the Andhra coast, it exceeds 40 feet in length. However, the beam and the depth measures about 8 feet and 4 feet, respectively, across the region. An oculus is sometimes painted on the bows of the masula boats in the Madras region. They are rowed by a crew varying from 8 to 12 men using bamboo or casuarina paddles, which consist of a board measuring about 10 inches in width and 14 inches in length, fixed at the end of a bamboo or young casuarina tree. They are steered by one or two tindals (coxswains), and two men are constantly kept to bale out the water. Mast and sail are not used in the masula boats as they never go far from the shore.

== See also ==
- Abora
- Barge
- Cabin cruiser
- Dory
- Fishing boat
- Halkett boat
- Inflatable boat
- Launch (boat)
- Log canoe
- Narrowboat
- Naval architecture
- Panga (boat)
- Pirogue
- Rescue craft
- Sampan
- Ship's boat
- Skiff
- Yacht
- Traditional fishing boats
- Watercraft rowing
