= INS Betwa =

The following ships of the Indian Navy have been named INS Betwa:

- INS Betwa (1959) was a Type 41 Leopard-class frigate launched in 1959 and broken up after 1988
- INS Betwa (F39) is a Brahmaputra-class guided-missile frigate launched in 1998
